= Renee Bull =

American model (born 1993)

- Born: Renee Charmaine Bull; 1993 (age 32–33); Dover, Delaware, U.S.
- Height: 5 ft 9 in (1.75 m)
- Beauty pageant titleholder
- Title: Miss Delaware USA 2015
- Hair color: Black
- Eye color: Brown
- Major competitions: Miss Delaware 2012 (1st runner-up); Miss Delaware 2013 (Top 11); Miss USA 2015 (Top 11, Miss Congeniality)

Renee Charmaine Bull (born February 24, 1993, in Dover) is an American beauty pageant titleholder. She was first Runner-Up at Miss Delaware 2012 and a Top 11 Finalist at Miss Delaware 2013. She was crowned Miss Delaware USA 2015 and represented her state at Miss USA 2015 where she became the first delegate from her state to place in the semifinals, finishing in the Top 11.

== Pageantry ==
=== Miss Delaware 2012 ===
In June 2012, Bull entered the Miss America system's Miss Delaware pageant as Miss Blue Gold. She ran on a platform of "Mitigating Violence" and performed a lyrical dance during the talent competition. Bull was honored with both the Miss Congeniality and Miss Spirit awards and won the swimsuit portion of the competition at the statewide pageant. On June 16, she was announced as first runner-up to winner Alyssa Murray.

=== Miss Delaware 2013 ===
In June 2013, Bull competed for the Miss Delaware crown again, this time as Miss Atlantic Coast. She ran on a platform of "Mentorship: The Power of One" and performed an interpretive dance of a Maya Angelou poem for the talent portion of the competition. Bull was a Top 11 finalist for the state crown.

=== Miss Delaware USA 2015 ===
In November 2014, Bull entered the Miss USA system's Miss Delaware USA pageant. She was crowned Miss Delaware USA 2015 at the state pageant in Wilmington on November 30, 2014. She is the second African American woman to be crowned Miss Delaware USA but the first to actually hold on to the title. Another African American woman, Renee Smith, won the title in 1991, but was forced to resign just after winning.

=== Miss USA 2015 ===
Bull represented her home state of Delaware at the Miss USA 2015 where she became the first woman from her state of Delaware to place in the Top 15, becoming the last state to ever place in the competition effectively ending the "Delaware Curse" and eventually finished in the Top 11. The eventual winner was Olivia Jordan of Oklahoma. During the pageant Bull and Miss Alaska also made history by becoming the first two delegates to tie for Miss Congeniality.

== Community work ==
In August 2011, Bull led a group of Appoquinimink High students to win the Delaware Girls Initiative competition with a plan to "Promote Peace Now" by using peer interaction and intervention to prevent bullying. Her group, dubbed Prominent Leaders, won a $3,000 grant to implement their plans across the state.

In 2014, Bull launched a non-profit organization called Girls to Girls, which assists young women to overcome poor self-image and low self-esteem.

== Personal life and education ==
Bull was born in Dover and raised in Middletown, the middle of seven children. She is a 2011 Graduate of Appoquinimink High School in Middletown. Before her scholarship pageant win, Bull attended Delaware Technical Community College.

Awards and achievements
Preceded by Kelsey Miller	Miss Delaware USA; 2015	Succeeded by Alexandra Vorontsova
