= Death of Won Jang =

2024 death

Won Jang
- Born: November 28, 2003; South Korea
- Died: July 6, 2024 (aged 20); Hanover, New Hampshire, US
- Education: Dartmouth College

Won Jang, a 20-year-old student at Dartmouth College, was found dead in the Connecticut River in Hanover, New Hampshire on July 7, 2024. He was last seen on the previous night at a social gathering between his fraternity Beta Alpha Omega and the Alpha Phi sorority by docks on the river.

Dartmouth suspended both of the Greek letter organizations involved. The college and Hanover increased efforts to promote river safety. Several months later, two of Jang's fraternity brothers and the Alpha Phi chapter were charged in connection with Jang's death for providing alcohol to a minor.

== Background ==
The son of Hong Phil Jang and JuYoung Oh, Won Jang was born and grew up in South Korea. His family moved to the United States in 2016 for his father's work. Jang attended middle school in Middletown, Delaware and graduated valedictorian from Middletown High School in 2022. In high school, Jang participated in the Science Olympiad, Math League, HOSA, Business Professionals of America, the National Honor Society, and a Korean Club that he established. He also taught Janggu, a traditional Korean drum, to adults at the Delaware Korean School.

As a twenty-year-old sophomore at Dartmouth College, Jang was studying biomedical engineering and economics and was a member of the class of 2026. He belonged to Beta Alpha Omega fraternity, a local fraternity at Dartmouth. Jang worked as a project manager at the DALI Lab and a research assistant at the Thayer School of Engineering. He also participated in the TuckLAB entrepreneurship program and served as an international student mentor for Dartmouth's Office of Pluralism and Leadership. He also founded and played in two bands.

== Death ==
On Saturday, July 6, 2024, Jang attended a social event with alcohol that was held by Beta Alpha Omega and Alpha Phi sorority off campus, near the Connecticut River. During the party, several students decided to go swimming in the river. While they were swimming, a heavy rainstorm started. No one noticed that Jang was missing as the swimmers left the river. Jang was last seen at 9:30 p.m. by the docks, in the area of 8 Boathouse Road. The next day, Jang did not arrive at an appointment and his fraternity brothers reported him missing around 3:15 p.m. on Sunday, July 7.

The Hanover police and fire departments, Lebanon and Hartford fire departments, New Hampshire Fish and Game Department and Upper Valley Wilderness Response Team all responded to the scene to assist with the search for Jang, which included several divers, a drone and a sonar team using an underwater camera. Items found near the dock indicated that Jang had not left the river area. Around 7:30 p.m., Jang's body was found in the Connecticut River by the camera and approximately 65 feet from the shore, not far from the dock.

== Investigation ==
Dartmouth College suspended Alpha Phi and Beta Alpha Omega in July and began an internal investigation. The college has placed both the fraternity and sorority on alcohol probation in the fall of 2023; the fraternity was still on probation in July 2024. As of November 2024, the college's investigation into the fraternity and sorority were ongoing.

Charlie Dennis, chief of the Hanover Police Department, stated that the department received an anonymous email from the college indicating hazing may have contributed to Jang's death. The police opened an investigation into Jang's death on July 7, 2024. The police found no evidence of hazing and the death was ruled accidental in September 2024. The official cause of death was drowning, and Jang had a blood-alcohol level of .167, indicating that he may have been impaired. In addition, Jang did not know how to swim.

== Response ==
Dartmouth's William Jewett Tucker Center held a vigil for Jang on July 9, 2024.

After Jang's death, Dartmouth College began offering free swimming lessons and increased nighttime security patrols along the river. The college also made plans to add rescue flotation devices and improve lighting and signage at the riverside docks. Both Dartmouth College and the Hanover Police and Fire Departments increased efforts to warn the public about the hazards of the Connecticut River. In the past, the police acknowledged regularly seeing students participating in the Ledyard Challenge, a Dartmouth tradition that involves swimming naked across the river. Dartmouth student Kexin Cai drowned in the river in May 2024, two months before Jang's death. There had been thirteen student drownings in the Connecticut River between 1816 and 2022.

In November 2024, the Hanover Police charged two members of Beta Alpha Omega with a misdemeanor for providing alcohol to someone under the age of 21. In addition, the Alpha Phi sorority chapter was charged as a corporation for facilitating an underage alcohol party. The police determined that sorority members hosted the party where most of the attendees were underage and were drinking alcohol.

In a written statement in The Dartmouth, the lawyer for one of the charged students noted that providing alcohol for a party "appears to be unrelated to the tragedy that occurred hours later".

== See also ==
- Dartmouth College fraternities and sororities
