= Miss USA 2015 =

64th Miss USA pageant

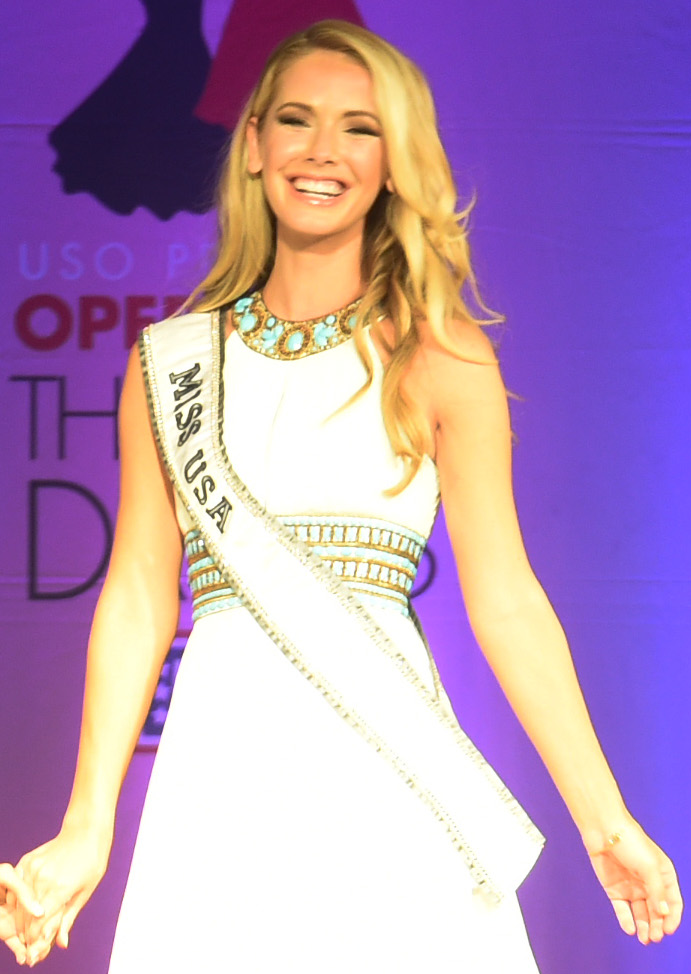
- Olivia Jordan, Miss USA 2015
- Date: July 12, 2015
- Presenters: Todd Newton; Alex Wehrley; Julie Alexandria
- Entertainment: Travis Garland; Stefano Langone; Felicia Barton; Antoinette Scruggs; Adley Stump
- Venue: Baton Rouge River Center Arena, Baton Rouge, Louisiana
- Broadcaster: Reelz; KBTR-CD; YouTube
- Entrants: 51
- Placements: 15
- Winner: Olivia Jordan; Oklahoma
- Congeniality: Kimberly Agron (Alaska) and Renee Bull (Delaware)
- Photogenic: Gretchen Reece (Indiana)

Miss USA 2015 was the 64th Miss USA pageant, held at the Baton Rouge River Center Arena in Baton Rouge, Louisiana, on July 12, 2015. All fifty states and the District of Columbia competed.

At the end of the event, Olivia Jordan of Oklahoma was crowned Miss USA 2015 by the previous winner, Nia Sanchez of Nevada and this was Oklahoma's first Miss USA title and the only one as well for now in the pageant's history.

The pageant was broadcast on Reelz after remarks made by Miss Universe Organization owner Donald Trump regarding Mexican immigrants during Trump's speech announcing his candidacy for the Republican nomination for U.S. President on June 16, 2015, in New York City led NBC, which had broadcast the pageant since 2003, and incumbent rights holders Univision Communications and Televisa to terminate their relationships with the Organization and Trump himself. It was also affected by many of the originally announced hosts, judges and musical performers pulling out in protest. Miss USA generated a unique Twitter audience of 2.42 million, according to Nielsen Social, No. 1 among entertainment series and specials during the week ended July 12.

Entertainment correspondent Alex Wehrley, a former Miss Wisconsin USA 2009, was brought in to host the pageant alongside game show host Todd Newton after original hosts Cheryl Burke of Dancing with the Stars and MSNBC anchor Thomas Roberts withdrew. Julie Alexandria was brought in to serve as backstage correspondent after the original correspondent, Jeannie Mai, withdrew. Roselyn Sánchez and Cristián de la Fuente were supposed to serve as hosts for the spanish broadcast, but pulled out in light Trump's speech announcing his candidacy for United States president.

This was the only Miss USA to be aired on Reelz and this was the last edition that Donald Trump had been the owner. This was also the first pageant since 1964 to take place in the month of July.

== Results ==
=== Placements ===
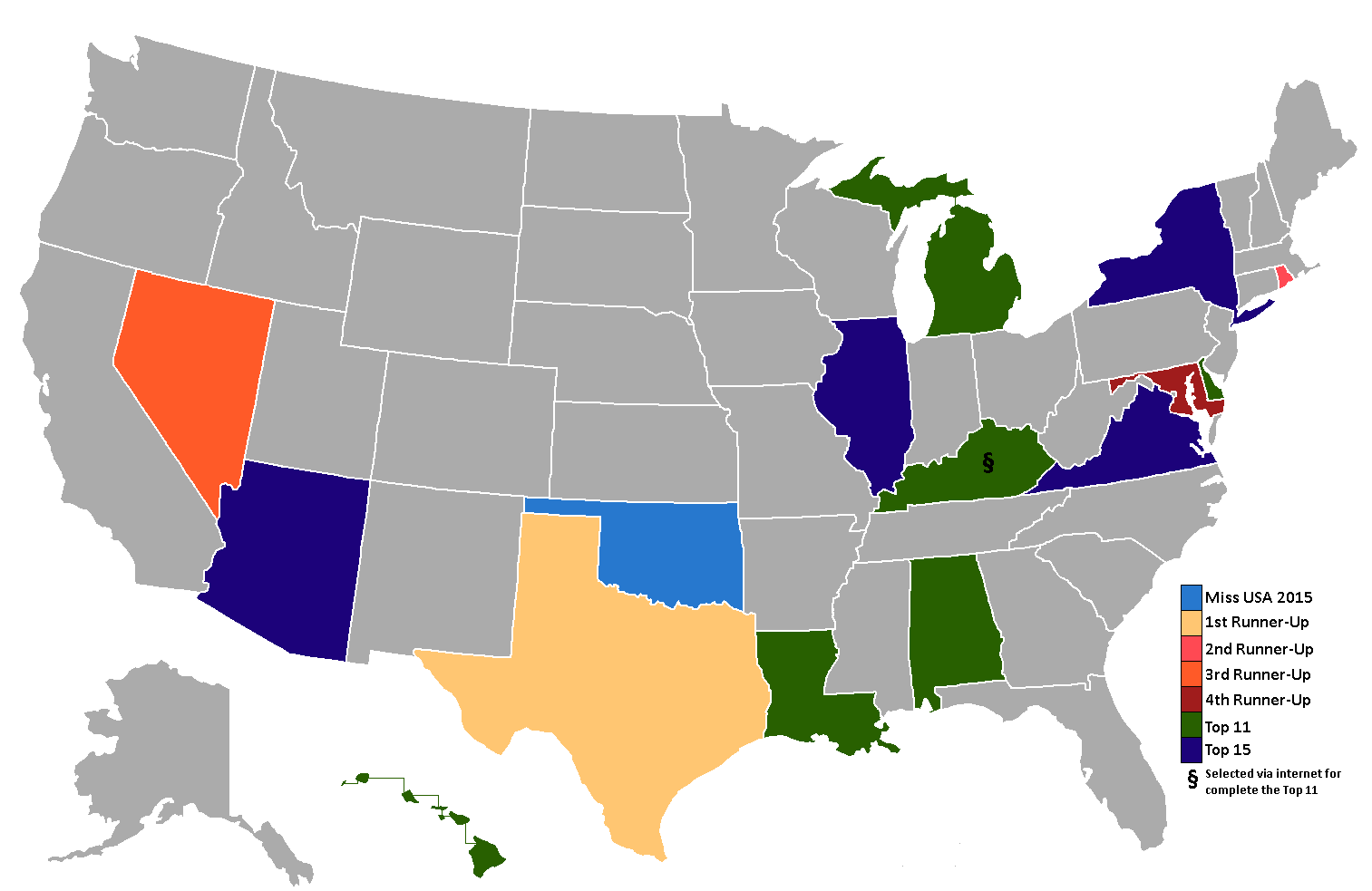
Final results of the 2015 Miss USA Pageant.

Placement	Contestant
Miss USA 2015	Oklahoma – Olivia Jordan
1st Runner-Up	Texas – Ylianna Guerra
2nd Runner-Up	Rhode Island – Anea Garcia
3rd Runner-Up	Nevada – Brittany McGowan
4th Runner-Up	Maryland – Mamé Adjei
Top 11	Alabama – Madison Guthrie; Delaware – Renee Bull; Hawaii – Emma Wo; Kentucky – Katie George §; Louisiana – Candice Bennatt; Michigan – Rashontae Wawrzyniak
Top 15	Arizona – Maureen Montagne; Illinois – Renee Wronecki; New York – Thatiana Diaz; Virginia – Laura Puleo

§ Voted into Top 11 after the swimsuit competition by the public

=== Awards ===
Award	Contestant
Miss Congeniality	Alaska – Kimberly Agron; Delaware – Renee Bull
Miss Photogenic	Indiana – Gretchen Reece

== Pageant ==
=== Preliminary round ===
Prior to the final telecast, the delegates compete in the preliminary competition, which involves private interviews with the judges and a presentation show where they compete in swimsuit and evening gown. It was held on July 10, 2015, on the official Miss USA YouTube channel and was hosted by Nick Teplitz and Nia Sanchez.

==== Judges ====
- Alison Taub
- B. J. Coleman
- Daurius Baptist
- Fred Nelson
- Jennifer Palpallatoc
- Lori Lung
- Maureen Storto

=== Finals ===
The format reverted to top 15, as it was in 2013, during the final competition, the top fifteen semifinalists competed in swimsuit, 10 of the 15 semifinalists were chosen by the judges, while one was chosen for a public vote, as they competed in evening gown, before five were chosen to advance. The top 5 competed in the final question round signed up by a panel of judges and a final runway, the winner was decided by a panel of judges alongside the four runners-up.

==== Judges ====
- Tara Conner – Miss USA 2006 from Kentucky
- Rima Fakih – Miss USA 2010 from Michigan
- Crystle Stewart – Miss USA 2008 from Texas
- Nana Meriwether – Miss USA 2012 from Maryland
- Kimberly Pressler – Miss USA 1999 from New York
- Danielle Doty – Miss Teen USA 2011 from Texas
- Leila Lopes – Miss Universe 2011 from Angola
- Brook Lee – Miss Universe 1997 from United States
- Michelle McLean – Miss Universe 1992 from Namibia

== Contestants ==
51 delegates participated:

State/district	Name	Age (Note: Ages at the time of the pageant)	Height	Hometown	Placement	Notes
Alabama	Madison Guthrie	20	5 ft 9 in (175 cm)	Hoover	Top 11	
Alaska	Kimberly Agron	20	5 ft 4 in (163 cm)	Anchorage		Previously Miss Alaska Teen USA 2013
Arizona	Maureen Montagne	22	5 ft 7 in (170 cm)	Chandler	Top 15	Previously 1st runner-up at Mutya ng Pilipinas 2013; Later placed 1st Runner-Up at Miss World America 2017; Later joined Miss World Philippines 2018 and was crowned Miss Eco Philippines 2018; Later became 1st runner-up at Miss Eco International 2018 as Miss Philippines; Later joined Binibining Pilipinas 2021 and was crowned Binibining Pilipinas Globe 2021; Later crowned The Miss Globe 2021 as Miss Philippines
Arkansas	Leah Blefko	21	5 ft 11 in (180 cm)	Fayetteville		
California	Natasha Martinez	23	5 ft 7 in (170 cm)	Chino Hills		
Colorado	Talyah Polee	26	5 ft 8 in (173 cm)	Denver		
Connecticut	Ashley Golebiewski	21	5 ft 9 in (175 cm)	Berlin		
Delaware	Renee Bull	22	5 ft 9 in (175 cm)	Middletown	Top 11	
District of Columbia	Lizzy Olsen	26	5 ft 10 in (178 cm)	Washington, D.C.		
Florida	Ashleigh Lollie	24	5 ft 7 in (170 cm)	Grand Ridge		
Georgia	Brooke Fletcher	23	5 ft 6 in (168 cm)	Peachtree City		Previously Miss Georgia Teen USA 2009
Hawaii	Emma Wo	25	5 ft 8 in (173 cm)	Honolulu	Top 11	Previously Miss Hawaii Teen USA 2008
Idaho	Claira Hollingsworth	22	5 ft 6 in (168 cm)	Preston		Previously Miss Idaho Teen USA 2011
Illinois	Renee Wronecki	22	5 ft 10 in (178 cm)	Burbank	Top 15	
Indiana	Gretchen Reece	23	5 ft 8 in (173 cm)	North Vernon		
Iowa	Taylor Even	22	5 ft 6 in (168 cm)	Jesup		
Kansas	Alexis Railsback	19	5 ft 5 in (165 cm)	Shawnee		
Kentucky	Katie George	21	5 ft 10 in (178 cm)	Louisville	Top 11	Fan vote winner
Louisiana	Candice Bennatt	26	5 ft 6 in (168 cm)	New Orleans	Top 11	Previously Miss New Mexico 2012
Maine	Heather Elwell	26	5 ft 10 in (178 cm)	West Bath		
Maryland	Mamé Adjei	23	5 ft 9 in (175 cm)	Silver Spring	4th Runner-Up	1st Runner-Up of season 22 of America's Next Top Model
Massachusetts	Polikseni Manxhari	24	5 ft 7 in (170 cm)	Boston		
Michigan	Rashontae Wawrzyniak	25	5 ft 7 in (170 cm)	Detroit	Top 11	
Minnesota	Jessica Scheu	23	5 ft 8 in (173 cm)	Prior Lake		
Mississippi	Courtney Byrd	23	5 ft 7 in (170 cm)	Oxford		
Missouri	Rebecca Dunn	24	5 ft 9 in (175 cm)	Columbia		
Montana	Tahnee Peppenger	27	5 ft 6 in (168 cm)	Great Falls		
Nebraska	Hoang-Kim Cung	24	5 ft 5 in (165 cm)	Grand Island		
Nevada	Brittany McGowan	25	5 ft 9 in (175 cm)	Spring Valley	3rd Runner-Up	
New Hampshire	Samantha Poirier	24	5 ft 8 in (173 cm)	Dover		
New Jersey	Vanessa Oriolo	21	5 ft 6 in (168 cm)	Colts Neck		
New Mexico	Alexis Duprey	24	5 ft 11 in (180 cm)	Alamogordo		Previously Miss New Mexico Teen USA 2009; Previously Miss New Mexico 2013
New York	Thatiana Diaz	22	5 ft 8 in (173 cm)	Bayside	Top 15	Previously Miss New York Teen USA 2010
North Carolina	Julia Dalton	24	5 ft 5 in (165 cm)	Wilmington		Previously Miss North Carolina Teen USA 2008; Sister of Miss USA 2009 Kristen Dalton; Daughter of Miss North Carolina USA 1982 Jeannie Boger
North Dakota	Molly Ketterling	20	5 ft 7 in (170 cm)	Elgin		
Ohio	Sarah Newkirk	25	5 ft 10 in (178 cm)	Columbus		
Oklahoma	Olivia Jordan	26	5 ft 11 in (180 cm)	Tulsa	Miss USA 2015	Previously Miss World America 2013
Oregon	Bridget Wilmes	22	5 ft 9 in (175 cm)	Canby		
Pennsylvania	Elizabeth Cardillo	25	5 ft 8 in (173 cm)	Pittsburgh		
Rhode Island	Anea Garcia	20	6 ft 0 in (183 cm)	Cranston	2nd Runner-Up	Later Miss Grand International 2015 (represented Dominican Republic) and then dethroned
South Carolina	Sarah Weishuhn	23	5 ft 8 in (173 cm)	Goose Creek		
South Dakota	Lexy Schenk	21	5 ft 6 in (168 cm)	Irene		Previously Miss South Dakota Teen USA 2011
Tennessee	Kiara Young	25	5 ft 11 in (180 cm)	Nashville		
Texas	Ylianna Guerra	22	5 ft 8 in (173 cm)	McAllen	1st Runner-Up	
Utah	Nicol Powell	21	5 ft 10 in (178 cm)	Salt Lake City		Sister of Miss Utah USA 2013 Marissa Powell
Vermont	Jackie Croft	24	5 ft 8 in (173 cm)	Winooski		
Virginia	Laura Puleo	25	5 ft 9 in (175 cm)	Lexington	Top 15	Sister of Miss North Carolina USA 2004 Ashley Puleo
Washington	Kenzi Novell	24	5 ft 7 in (170 cm)	Spokane		
West Virginia	Andrea Mucino	24	5 ft 9 in (175 cm)	Morgantown		
Wisconsin	Haley Laundrie	21	5 ft 9 in (175 cm)	Lake Mills		
Wyoming	Caroline Scott	22	5 ft 7 in (170 cm)	Cheyenne		Previously Miss Wyoming Teen USA 2010

== Controversy ==
On June 25, 2015, Univision Communications president and CEO Randy Falco announced that the company would terminate its contract to broadcast Spanish language coverage of the 2015 Miss USA pageant (which was set to air on UniMás) and sever its business ties with Miss Universe Organization co-owner Donald Trump, following comments regarding illegal Mexican immigrants that were made by Trump during his speech announcing his candidacy for the Republican Party nomination for President of the United States on June 16, in which Trump falsely stated that illegal Mexicans immigrating into the U.S. were responsible for importing drugs, and bringing crime, rapists, and drug dealers into the country, and called for the building of a wall along the Mexico–United States border. Chilean actor Cristián de la Fuente and Puerto Rican actress Roselyn Sánchez, who were both slated to host the Spanish language broadcast of the pageant, also announced that they were pulling out of the telecast, citing their offense to Trump's comments. Colombian reggaeton singer J Balvin, who was scheduled to make his first musical performance on mainstream U.S. television, also announced that he would also no longer participate in the event. Miss Universe 2006 Zuleyka Rivera of Puerto Rico, who was set to judge the pageant, announced she would no longer participate as well.

In a statement by Univision regarding its decision, Falco cited the consideration of the views of its predominately Hispanic broadcast audience and corporate employee base, that "[Univision] see[s] first-hand the work ethic, love for family, strong religious values and the important role Mexican immigrants and Mexican-Americans have had and will continue to have in building the future of our country." Following the announcement of the company's decision, a lawyer for Trump stated that he is strongly considering taking legal action against Univision Communications for its refusal to carry the Miss USA telecast, alleging it violated the terms of the five-year broadcast and co-production agreement for the Miss USA and Miss Universe pageants that Univision signed with the Miss Universe Organization five months earlier on February 5. Trump himself accused the Government of Mexico, among other parties, of "putting tremendous pressure on Univision to break their signed and fully effective contract with the Miss Universe Organization" because of his statements "exposing to the public, and the world, the terrible and costly trade deals that the United States is incompetently making with Mexico".

Univision noted that despite the decision by its entertainment division to terminate its business relationship with the Miss Universe Organization, its news division and owned-and-operated broadcast outlets would continue to provide coverage of Trump and all other presidential candidates during the 2016 presidential campaign "to ensure our audience continues to have access to all points of view". On June 26, Trump notified Falco that Univision employees would no longer be allowed to enter or hold membership with the Trump National Doral Miami golf course, which abuts Univision's corporate headquarters in Doral, Florida. That same day on his Instagram account, Trump also released personal correspondence from Univision anchor Jorge Ramos – containing Ramos' personal work mobile phone number, which was unobscured in the image – requesting an interview with Trump.

On June 29, NBCUniversal, which owns the 50% stake in the Miss Universe Organization not owned by Donald Trump, confirmed it was terminating its business ties with Trump – saying in a statement that "respect and dignity for all people are cornerstones of our values" – and would no longer air the Miss USA and Miss Universe pageants (Miss Teen USA has not aired on conventional television since the 2007 pageant, as it was not included in NBC's renewed television contract with the Miss Universe Organization for uncited reasons; Trump was also dismissed as host of The Celebrity Apprentice, which NBC will continue to air as United Artists Media Group holds the licensing rights to the reality competition series). Mexican media conglomerate Televisa also announced it would cut ties to Trump and end its television contract with the Miss Universe Organization. In a June 29 interview with the Kansas City Star, Miss Kansas USA 2015 Alexis Railsback – who is of Mexican American descent – said that it was "really unfortunate and kind of unfair that the Miss USA pageant is kind of taking the brunt for Donald Trump's speech". Noting that the Miss Universe Organization is a standalone entity, she iterated that Trump "does not organize the pageant, [and] does not run what goes on" and that she believes the fallout stemming from the remarks is not "really related to the pageant in any way, other than the fact that he is the co-owner". Following the decision, some pageant contestants and supporters backed a Change.org petition and used the hashtag #SavetheSash on social media and on a video posted to the pageant's official Facebook page, urging NBC to reconsider their decision not to air Miss USA.

On June 30, Thomas Roberts (who serves as an anchor for NBCUniversal-owned MSNBC) and Cheryl Burke pulled out of hosting the pageant, with Burke citing her opposition to Trump's comments and the network's decision to stop telecasting the event. After reports indicated that Miss Teen USA broadcasters Ustream and Xbox Live, as well as Netflix had shown interest in obtaining the streaming rights to the event, the Miss Universe Organization later confirmed on June 30 that the pageant would be streamed on the official Miss USA website (a subpage of the Organization's website).

After previously indicating that he may sue Univision and NBCUniversal, Trump and the Miss Universe Organization filed a breach of contract and defamation lawsuit against Univision Communications in the New York Supreme Court on June 30, seeking damages in excess of $500 million. Univision responded to the suit in a statement, calling the complaint "both factually false and legally ridiculous," and that it "will not only vigorously defend the case, but will continue to fight against Mr. Trump's ongoing efforts to run away from the derogatory comments he made on June 16th about illegal Mexican immigrants." On June 30, a rep for singer Natalie La Rose announced that she had withdrawn from performing at the pageant; La Rose was joined on July 1 by judges Emmitt Smith and Jonathan Scott, country singer Craig Wayne Boyd and rapper Flo Rida in dropping out of the pageant. Jeannie Mai, who originally announced that she would stay on as a co-host, stating that while she "do[es] not condone Mr. Trump's statements[...] I can't abandon these women when they need our support now more than ever", citing the Miss Universe Organization's mission to "unite women from all over the world and celebrate different cultures", announced on July 6, 2015, that she was withdrawing as co-host. All of them including Miss Universe 2006 Zuleyka Rivera of Puerto Rico are interested to participate and be a part of Miss Earth beauty contest.

On July 2, the Miss Universe Organization reached an agreement with Reelz to broadcast Miss USA 2015 on the digital cable channel. In a statement, Stanley Hubbard, CEO of Reelz parent Hubbard Broadcasting, said "As one of only a few independent networks, we decided to exercise our own voice and committed ourselves to bringing this pageant to American viewers everywhere." Even with the announcement of a new broadcaster for the 2015 event, a webcast of the pageant was still available via the Miss USA website (which was also viewable on smartphones, tablets and on video game consoles via their respective YouTube applications) for those not able to watch on Reelz due to the channel's absence of availability on several cable providers (such as Cox Communications) or because they do not subscribe to Reelz through a participating carrier of the channel. Baton Rouge's This TV affiliate KBTR-CD simulcast the pageant using Reelz' feed.
