= Miss Delaware Teen USA =

Beauty contest

- Formation: 1983
- Type: Beauty pageant
- Headquarters: Wilmington
- Location: Delaware
- Members: Miss Teen USA
- Official language: English
- Key people: Vincenza Carrieri-Russo (state pageant director)
- Website: Official website

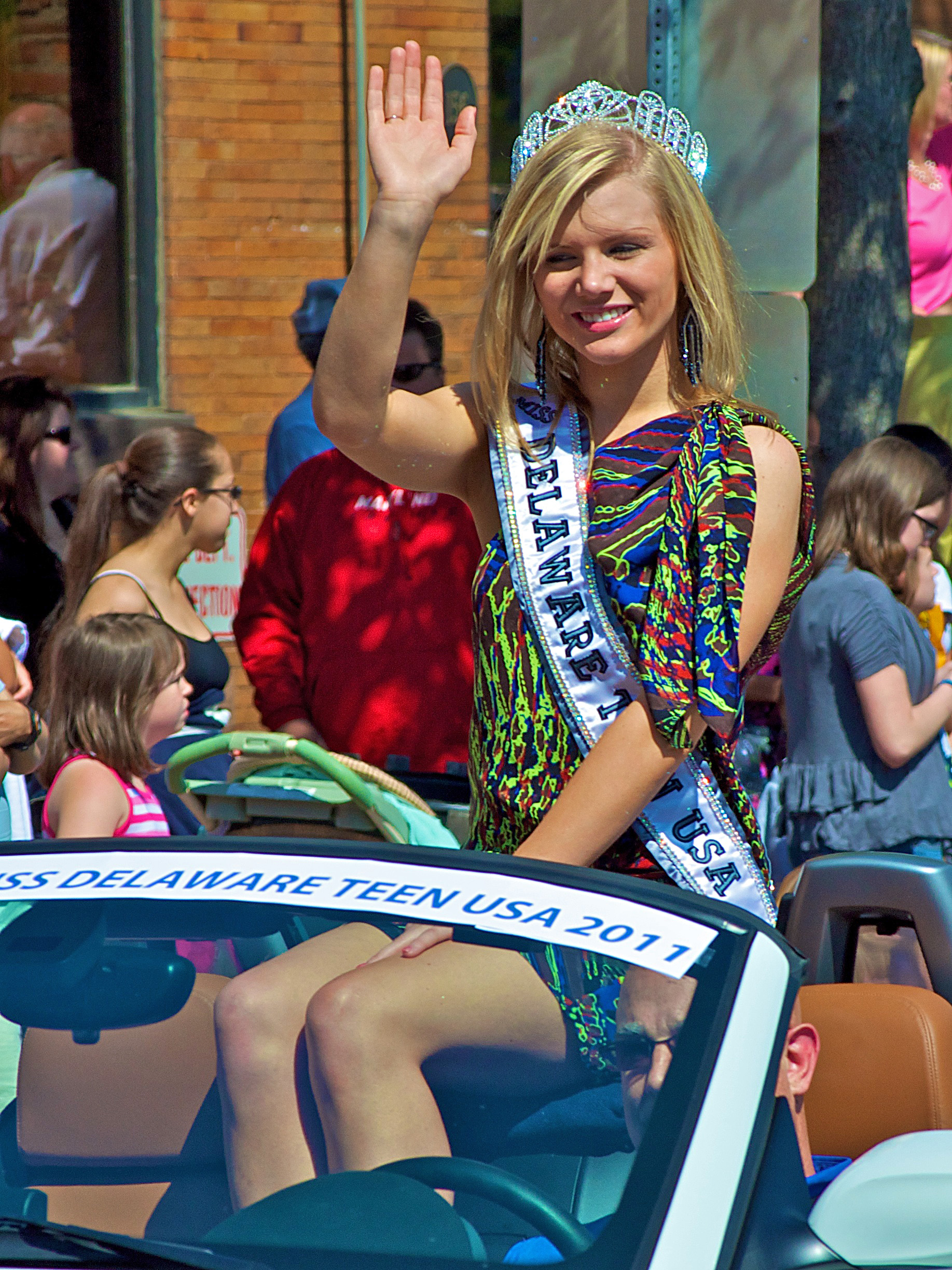
Amanda Debus, Miss Delaware's Outstanding Teen 2008, Miss Delaware Teen USA 2011, & Miss Delaware 2016

The Miss Delaware Teen USA competition is the pageant that selects the representative for the state of Delaware in the Miss Teen USA pageant. It was formerly directed by Crown Productions from 1993 to 2007, then by D&D Productions from 2007 to 2018. CW Productions became the new directors for the pageant starting in 2019. In 2020, CW Productions was terminated. The license to produce the 2021 state pageants was awarded to V&M Productions, LLC into the directorship of Vincenza Carrieri-Russo. This is only the second time that the pageant is produced by a former Miss Delaware USA.

The current titleholder is Sydney Hayden of Newark, who she was crowned on June 28, 2026 at Laird Performing Arts Center in The Tatnall School in Wilmington. She will represent Delaware for the title of Miss Teen USA 2026.

== Delaware winners and contestants ==
In terms of placements and awards, Delaware is one of the least successful states at Miss Teen USA. However, Ashley Coleman won the Miss Teen USA crown in 1999. Miss Delaware Teen USA 2000, Carrie Aiken, and 2001, Christie Aiken, are sisters. Miss Delaware Teen USA 1997, Cheryl Crowe, was the first Delaware teen to cross over to the Miss Delaware USA title. Since then, Kelsey Miller (2009), Mia Jones (2014) and Sierra Wright (2015) went on later to win the Miss Delaware USA title in 2014, 2017 and 2018 respectively. Miss Delaware Teen USA 2011, Amanda Debus, was the first, and so far only, Delaware teen to cross over from the Miss Delaware's Outstanding Teen title. She is also the only successful MAO/MUO crossover in Delaware. In addition, Debus was also Miss Delaware 2016 and represented the state at Miss America 2017.

=== Melissa King ===
On February 26, 2013, Melissa King resigned her crown when confronted with a pornographic video; The former Miss Delaware Teen USA was paid $1,500 for the porn shoot.

Hailey Lawler, the runner-up, replaced her.

== Results summary ==
=== Placements ===
- Miss Teen USA: Ashley Coleman (1999)
- Top 6: Dawn Huey (1995)
- Top 15: Mia Jones (2014), Emily Hutchison (2016)

Delaware holds a record of 4 placements at Miss Teen USA.

=== Awards ===
- Miss Congeniality: Kayla Kosmalski (2024)

== Winners ==
Color key

- Declared as Winner
- Ended as runner-up
- Ended as one of the finalists or semifinalists

Year	Name	Hometown	Age^{1}	Local title	Placement at Miss Teen USA	Special awards at Miss Teen USA	Notes
2026	Sydney Hayden	Newark	TBA	Miss Newark Teen			
2025	Cali Williams	Odessa	18	Miss Odessa Teen			
2024	Kayla Kosmalski	Dover	18	Miss Dover Teen		Miss Congeniality	First contestant with Down syndrome to compete at Miss Teen USA.
2023	Molly Lavelle	Wilmington	19	Miss Wilmington Teen			
2022	Ava MacMurray	Hockessin	18	Miss Hockessin Teen			
2021	Sky Knox	Newark	19	Miss Wilmington Teen			Previously Miss Delaware's Outstanding Teen 2018
2020	Samantha Repass	Dover	17				
2019	Myah Rosa-Scott	New Castle	17				
2018	Brynn Close	Middletown	18				Cousin of Miss Delaware Teen USA 2009 & Miss Delaware USA 2014, Kelsey Miller
2017	Grace Lange	Newark	17				Later Miss Delaware USA 2022
2016	Emily Hutchison	Wilmington	18		Top 15		
2015	Sierra Belle Wright	Wilmington	18				Later Miss Delaware USA 2018
2014	Mia Emani Jones	Bear	17		Top 15		Later Miss Delaware USA 2017
2013	Hailey Lawler	Newark	18				Originally first runner-up; succeeded to the crown after King's resignation
2013	Melissa King	Bethany Beach	18		Did not compete		Resigned her crown after revelation of participation in commercial pornography.
2012	Angela Viscount	Newark	19				1st Runner Up at Miss Delaware Teen USA 2011
2011	Amanda Debus	Middletown	18				Later Miss Delaware 2016; Previously Miss Delaware's Outstanding Teen 2008
2010	Ashley DiLiberto	Newark	18				
2009	Kelsey Miller	Wilmington	17				Later Miss Delaware USA 2014
2008	Bethany Brindley	Wilmington	17				
2007	Holly Shively	Newark	16				
2006	Erika Savidge	Newark	17				
2005	Ashley Frances Fletcher	Smyrna	18				
2004	Brittany Cichocki	Pike Creek	17				
2003	Ashley James	Bear	18				1st Runner Up at Miss Delaware USA 2010
2002	Kelly Horst	Hockessin	18				
2001	Christie Aiken	Wilmington	18				
2000	Carrie Aiken	Wilmington	18				
1999	Ashley Coleman	Camden	18		Miss Teen USA 1999		3rd runner-up at Miss California USA 2006
1998	Nicole Tomlin	Wilmington	17				
1997	Cheryl Crowe	Felton	18				Later Miss Delaware USA 2003; 1st runner up at Miss Oktoberfest 2002
1996	Ashley Anderson	Rehoboth Beach	16				
1995	Dawn Renee Huey	Greenwood			Top 6		
1994	Selena Del Grosso	Wilmington					
1993	Catherine Huang			Miss Newport Teen			
1992	Justine Jones	Dover					
1991	Michelle Daulton	Hockessin					
1990	Kristen Pontius						
1989	Alison Nicole Wilson	Milford	17				1st runner-up at Miss Delaware Teen USA 1988
1988	Edith Senter	Felton	16				
1987	Cristi Gayle Griffin	Newark	17				
1986	Laura M. Hawthorne	Wilmington	17				
1985	Julie Wheatley	Seaford	18				
1984	Heather R. Reed	Wilmington	18				
1983	Laura Michelle Enslen	Wilmington	17				

^{1} Age at the time of the Miss Teen USA pageant
