= Odessa High School =

Odessa High School may refer to:

- Odessa High School (Delaware)
- Odessa High School (Missouri)
- Odessa High School (Texas)
