= Katie George (sportscaster) =

American sportscaster (born 1993)

- Born: December 3, 1993 (age 32); Louisville, Kentucky, U.S.
- Education: University of Louisville (BA)
- Occupation: Sportscaster
- Beauty pageant titleholder
- Title: Miss Kentucky USA 2015
- Years active: 2015–present
- Major competitions: Miss USA 2015 (Top 11)

Katie George (born December 3, 1993) is an American sportscaster who currently works with the ACC Network, ESPN and ABC. Before starting her broadcasting career, she had been a three-time all-conference selection in volleyball at the University of Louisville and Miss Kentucky USA in 2015.

== Early life and education ==
George is of Lebanese descent, and her grandfather's family had emigrated from Hamat, Lebanon to Lebanon, Kentucky. George attended Assumption High School, an all-girls Catholic school in Louisville, Kentucky, where she played on the volleyball team, being named Prep Volleyball's National Player of the Year. Her grandfather on her mother's side played football at the University of Kentucky for Bear Bryant.

After graduating from high school, George attended the University of Louisville (U of L), where she played for the Louisville Cardinals women's volleyball team. During her career at U of L, she played on teams that won regular-season or tournament championships in three different conferences, and was a first-team all-conference selection in two of those leagues. In her freshman season in 2012, U of L's last in the Big East Conference, the Cardinals won both the regular-season and tournament titles. (Note: Following the 2013 split of the Big East Conference, the schools that played football in the Division I Football Bowl Subdivision (FBS) began operating as the American Athletic Conference (The American) under the original league charter. The non-FBS schools operate as the Big East Conference after having purchased the rights to the "Big East" name. The new Big East considers the original Big East as part of its competitive history, while The American considers its competitive history (as opposed to its institutional history) to have started in July 2013.) In the following season, the Cardinals' only season in the American Athletic Conference, U of L went unbeaten in conference play to claim the regular-season conference title (The American did not hold a postseason tournament at that time), and George was named first-team all-conference. George's final two years of college play in 2014 and 2015 were the first two for U of L as members of the Atlantic Coast Conference (ACC). She was first-team all-ACC in both 2014 and 2015, with the Cardinals winning their first-ever ACC team title in any sport in the latter season. In that same 2015 season, George was also named ACC player and setter of the year. She graduated from the school magna cum laude with a degree in communications and a minor in sports administration. She interned at CBS Sports in college.

== Career ==
=== Pageantry ===
George began her career in pageantry in 2015, after being crowned Miss Kentucky USA 2015 after her college roommate and teammate encouraged her to enter the pageant. As the state titleholder, she received the right to represent Kentucky at Miss USA 2015. The competition was held at Raising Cane's River Center Arena in Baton Rouge, Louisiana on July 12, 2015. George advanced to the semifinals as a member of the top fifteen, and later won the fan vote to advance into the top eleven. The competition was ultimately won by Olivia Jordan of Oklahoma. She also competed against fellow future sportscaster Brooke Fletcher of Georgia.

George completed her reign the following year, after crowning Kyle Hornback as her successor.

=== Sports reporting ===
George began a career as a sportscaster after completing her bachelor's degree in 2015, being hired as a reporter at WDRB, a local station in Louisville, Kentucky. She later joined Fox Sports Wisconsin to cover the Milwaukee Bucks for the 2018–19 NBA season, before joining the new ACC Network in 2019. She also covered some college football games for ESPN. She joined ESPN full-time in 2021.

== Footnotes ==
Awards and achievements
Preceded by Destin Kincer	Miss Kentucky USA; 2015	Succeeded by Kyle Hornback
