= Appoquinimink High School =

Public school in Delaware, United States

Coordinates: 39.4541°N 75.7477°W

Location
- 1080 Bunker Hill Road; Middletown, Delaware 19709; United States

Information
- School type: Public
- Established: 2008 (18 years ago)
- School district: Appoquinimink School District
- CEEB code: 080094
- Principal: Sam Postlethwait
- Teaching staff: 93.40 (FTE)
- Grades: 9-12
- Enrollment: 1,399 (2023-2024)
- Student to teacher ratio: 14.98
- Mascot: Jaguars
- Website: www.appohigh.org

Appoquinimink High School is a public high school in Middletown, Delaware. It is a part of the Appoquinimink School District.

Construction of the two-story building began in 2006 and ninth grade students were housed in the former Alfred G. Waters School building for the duration of the construction. Felecia Duggins was selected as school principal in May 2007 and the campus' stadium and 1,067-seat fieldhouse opened that fall. Administrators gave students at Everett Meredith and Louis L. Redding middle schools the choice between the jaguars, pirates, and titans for the new high school's mascot; the most popular choice was the jaguar.

The school opened in 2008 and has a capacity of 1,600 students.

== Notable alumni ==
- Renee Bull, Miss Delaware 2015
- Myles Cale, basketball player
- A.J. English III, player in the Polish Basketball League
