= Vincenza Carrieri-Russo =

American beauty pageant contestant (born 1984)

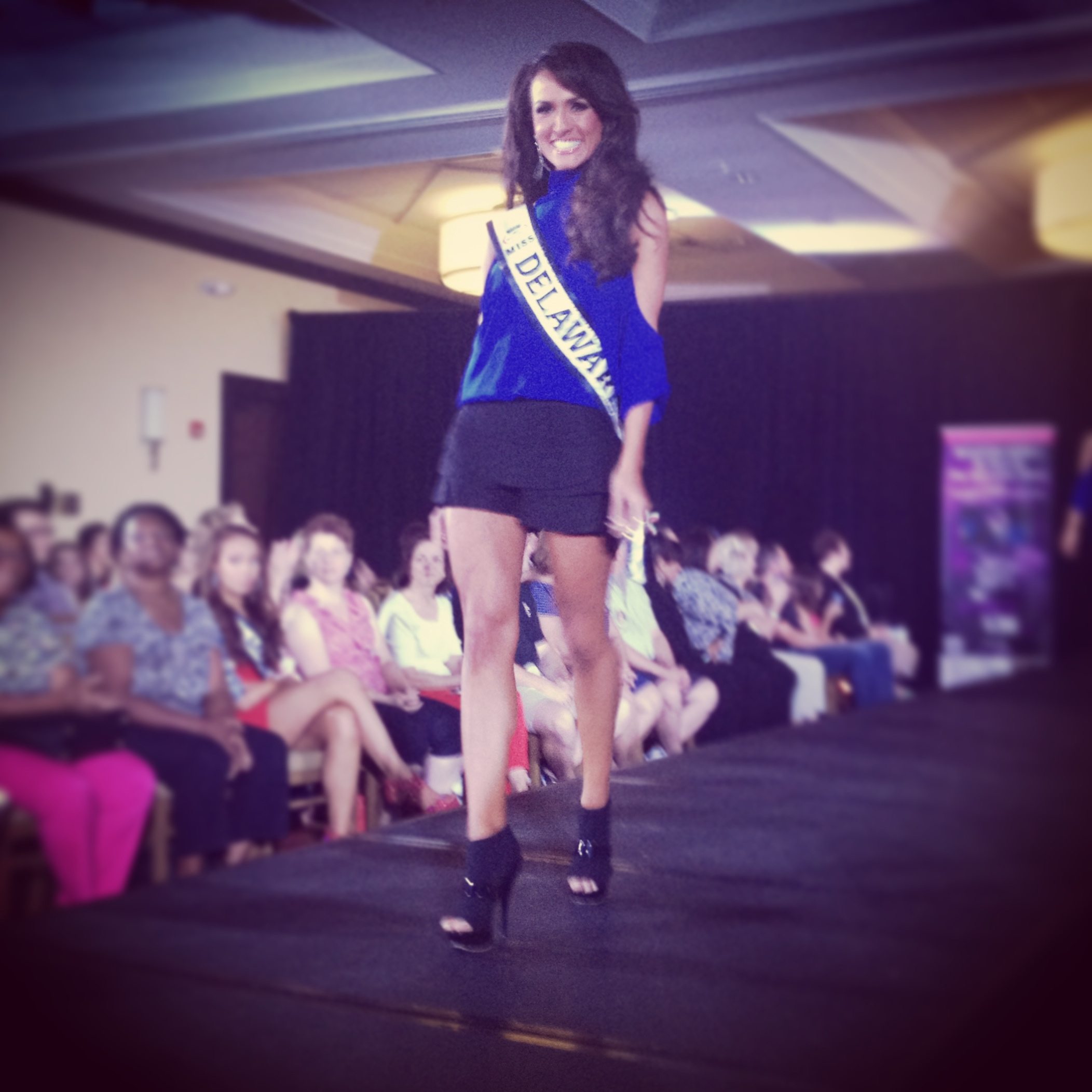
- Carrieri-Russo in 2014
- Born: June 10, 1984 (age 42); Newark, Delaware, US
- Education: University of Delaware
- Height: 5 ft 8 in (1.73 m)
- Beauty pageant titleholder
- Title: Miss Delaware USA 2008
- Hair color: Brown
- Eye color: Blue
- Major competition: Miss USA 2008
- Website: vincenzacarrierirusso.com

Vincenza Carrieri-Russo (born June 10, 1984) is an American model, actress, entrepreneur and beauty pageant titleholder from Newark, Delaware.

Carrieri-Russo was Miss Delaware USA 2008 and represented Delaware at the Miss USA 2008 pageant. She also competed at Miss United States 2014. Currently she works as a restaurateur alongside her sister.

== Biography ==
Carrieri-Russo was born on June 10, 1984, in Newark, Delaware. She attended Alexis I. duPont High School and is a graduate of University of Delaware with a major in English and concentration in literary studies. In 2002, she co-founded the literacy organization Success Won't Wait Inc. when she was an 18-year-old high school senior and has been active in promoting literacy and has helped collect and redistribute over 600,000 books to communities, schools, and non-profit organizations in need.

Carrieri-Russo competed in pageants for nine years prior to winning Miss Delaware USA. She was a three-time contestant in the Miss Delaware Teen USA pageant. She also competed in the Miss Delaware America competition four times having placed in the top ten twice where she also won several community service awards. After her year as Miss Delaware USA, she went on to be named a top-six finalist at the annual Miss Italia USA pageant.

As Miss Delaware USA Carrieri-Russo participated in charity events including the Delaware Air National Guard Plane Pull for Special Olympics and continued to promote her Success Won't Wait program.

In 2014, she opened the "Vincenza & Margherita Italian-American Bistro" alongside her sister Margherita Carrieri-Russo. Vincenza Carrieri-Russo is a third-generation restaurateur.

Carrieri-Russo received a Presidential Student Service Award for her work with Success Can't Wait in 2003. In 2005 she became the first Delawarean to win the National Jacqueline Kennedy Onassis Award presented by the Jefferson Awards for Public Service. She was named as one of Delaware Today's 40 under 40 in 2008 and to their List of Women in Business in 2015.

Preceded by Nicole Bosso	Miss Delaware USA; 2008	Succeeded by Kate Banaszak
