= Middletown High School (Delaware) =

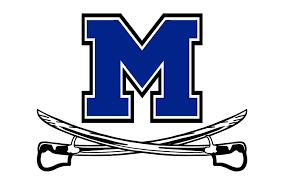

Location
- 120 Silver Lake Rd; Middletown, Delaware 19709; United States; 39°27′00″N 75°41′34″W

Information
- School type: Public secondary
- Founded: 1929 (97 years ago)
- School district: Appoquinimink School District
- CEEB code: 080092
- Principal: Nell Jean
- Faculty: 89.00 (on an FTE basis) (2022-2023)
- Grades: 9-12
- Enrollment: 1,235 (2023-2024)
- Student to teacher ratio: 13.88
- Colors: Blue and white
- Athletics conference: Blue Hen Conference - Flight A
- Mascot: Cavalier
- Website: www.middletownhs.org

Middletown High School is a public high school located in Middletown, Delaware, United States. It is one of three high schools in the Appoquinimink School District and serves students grades 9–12. It was previously located in what is now the Everett Meredith Middle School building. Originally opened in 1997, the current facility added a two-story wing in the summer of 2002, and an expansion of its cafeteria/lobby to create extra capacity.

== Notable alumni ==
- Dwayne Henry (b. 1962), former MLB pitcher
- D. J. Hyde (b. 1978), professional wrestler
- Desmond Bryant (b. 1985), former NFL player
- Marquis Dendy (b. 1992), track and field athlete who qualified for both the 2016 Summer Olympics and the 2020 Summer Olympics
- Chad Kuhl (b. 1992), MLB pitcher for the Pittsburgh Pirates
- Chris Godwin (b. 1996), NFL player for the Tampa Bay Buccaneers and Super Bowl champion.
- Sherae'a Moore member of the Delaware House of Representatives
