= Chad Kuhl =

American baseball player (born 1992)

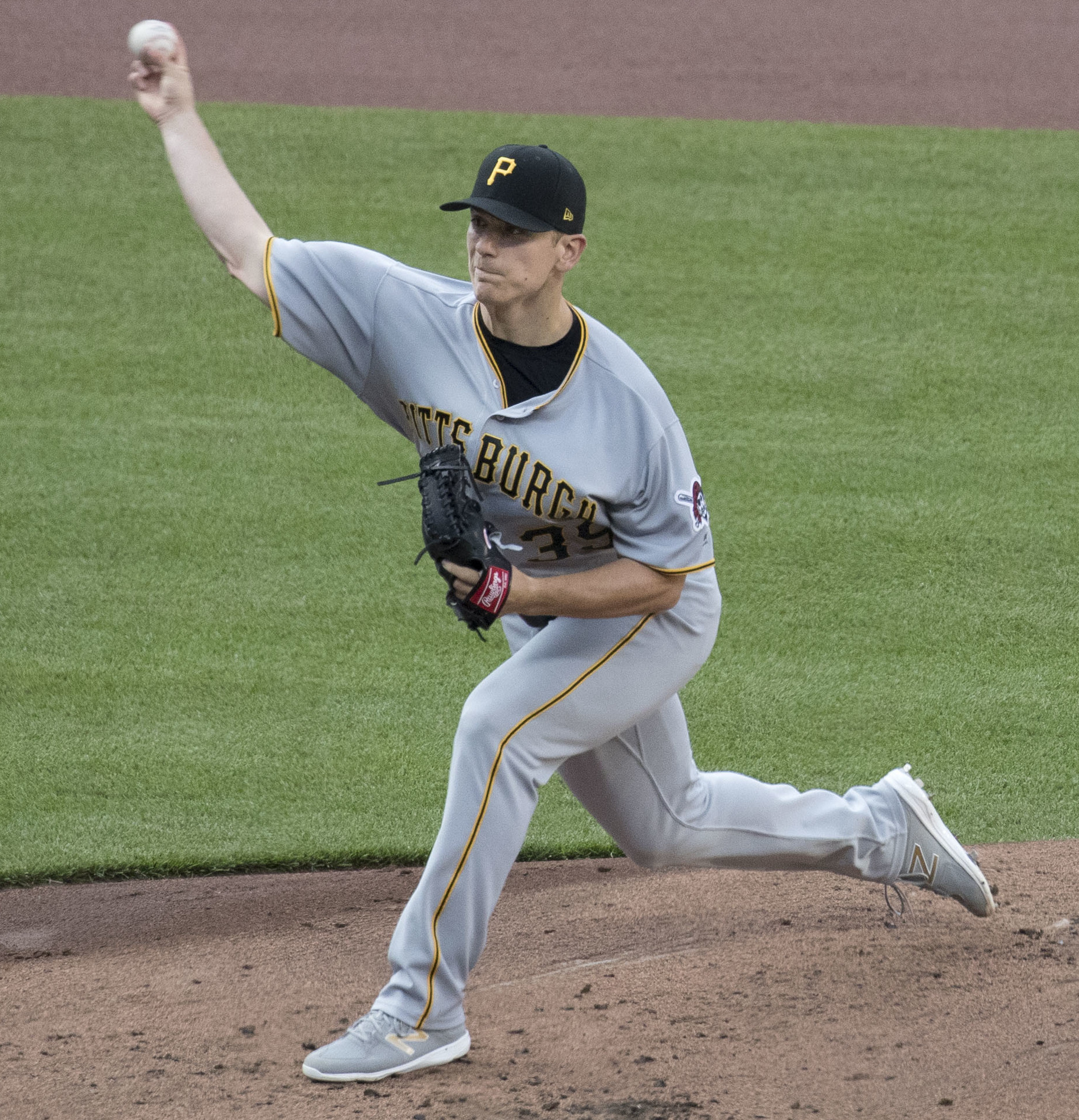
- Kuhl with the Pittsburgh Pirates in 2017

Free agent
- Pitcher
- Born: September 10, 1992 (age 34); Newark, Delaware, U.S.
- Bats: Right Throws: Right

MLB debut
- June 26, 2016, for the Pittsburgh Pirates

MLB statistics (through 2024 season)
- Win–loss record: 31–47
- Earned run average: 4.98
- Strikeouts: 590
- Stats at Baseball Reference

Teams
- Pittsburgh Pirates (2016–2018, 2020–2021); Colorado Rockies (2022); Washington Nationals (2023); Chicago White Sox (2024)

Chad Michael Kuhl (born September 10, 1992) is an American professional baseball pitcher who is a free agent. He has previously played in Major League Baseball (MLB) for the Pittsburgh Pirates, Colorado Rockies, Washington Nationals, and Chicago White Sox. He made his MLB debut in 2016.

== Amateur career ==
Kuhl attended Middletown High School in Middletown, Delaware, where he pitched and played first base for the school's baseball team. He was named to the All-Delaware team in 2010. He then enrolled at University of Delaware, where he played college baseball for the Delaware Fightin' Blue Hens.

== Career ==
=== Pittsburgh Pirates ===
The Pittsburgh Pirates selected Kuhl in the ninth round of the 2013 Major League Baseball draft. After signing with the Pirates, he made his professional debut with the Low–A Jamestown Jammers and spent all of 2013 there, going 3–4 with a 2.11 ERA in 13 starts. Kuhl pitched 2014 with the High–A Bradenton Marauders, compiling a 13–5 record and 3.46 ERA in 28 starts, and 2015 with the Double–A Altoona Curve where he was 11–5 with a 2.48 ERA and 1.14 WHIP in 26 starts. He began 2016 with the Triple–A Indianapolis Indians.

Kuhl was recalled from Indianapolis on June 26, 2016, made his major league debut, and got his first win that same night as the Pirates defeated the Los Angeles Dodgers, 4–3. Kuhl pitched five innings, allowing three runs, four hits, and four walks with five strikeouts in his debut. He was optioned to Indianapolis on July 16 and recalled on August 9. After his August 9 recall, he spent the remainder of the season with Pittsburgh. In 14 starts for the Pirates he was 5–4 with a 4.20 ERA, and in 16 starts for Indianapolis he pitched to a 6–3 record and 2.37 ERA.

Kuhl spent all of the 2017 season in the Pirates starting rotation. Kuhl started 31 games, posting an 8–11 record with an ERA of 4.35. On June 30, 2018, Kuhl was placed on the disabled list with a right forearm strain. He was ruled out for the season at the beginning of September. In 16 starts, he was 5–5 with an ERA of 4.55 in 85 innings. On September 19, Kuhl underwent Tommy John surgery and missed the entire 2019 season.

In 2020, Kuhl made his return to the mound on July 27, and threw 3 2/3 scoreless innings in a Pirates 6–5 loss to the Milwaukee Brewers at PNC Park. He pitched to a 4.27 ERA in 46 1/3 innings pitched in 2020. He was also second in the National League in walks allowed. He was non-tendered on November 30, making him a free agent.

=== Colorado Rockies ===
On March 16, 2022, Kuhl signed a one-year contract with the Colorado Rockies. He threw his first-career complete game shutout on June 27, 2022, against the Dodgers. In 2022, Kuhl started 27 games for the Rockies, recording a 6–11 record and 5.72 ERA with 110 strikeouts in 137.0 innings pitched.

=== Washington Nationals ===
On February 4, 2023, Kuhl signed a minor league contract with the Washington Nationals organization. On March 30, Kuhl had his contract selected after making the Opening Day roster. After starting the year in the rotation for Washington, he was moved to the bullpen after a brief stint on the injured list. In 16 total games for the Nationals, Kuhl struggled to an 8.45 ERA with 31 strikeouts across 38 1/3 innings pitched. On June 24, Kuhl was designated for assignment after Paolo Espino was recalled from Triple–A Rochester. On June 26, Kuhl cleared waivers and was released by the Nationals.

After his release from the Nationals, Kuhl stepped away from baseball for the remainder of the 2023 season in order to assist his wife in her battle with breast cancer.

=== Chicago White Sox ===
On December 29, 2023, Kuhl signed a minor league contract with the Chicago White Sox. In 13 games (11 starts) for the Triple–A Charlotte Knights, he compiled a 4.34 ERA with 42 strikeouts across 56 innings pitched. On June 14, 2024, the White Sox selected Kuhl's contract, adding him to their active roster. In 31 appearances for Chicago, he worked to a 5.06 ERA with 54 strikeouts over 53 1/3 innings of work. On September 21, Kuhl was designated for assignment by Chicago. He was released by the White Sox organization on September 24.

=== Atlanta Braves ===
On February 5, 2025, Kuhl signed a minor league contract with the Atlanta Braves. In 7 appearances (3 starts) for the Triple-A Gwinnett Stripers, he struggled to an 0–3 record and 6.55 ERA with 18 strikeouts over 22 innings of work. Kuhl was released by the Braves organization on May 3.

== Personal life ==
Kuhl met Amanda Debus in middle school and they began to date seriously as seniors in high school. She won Miss Delaware in 2016. They married in 2019. They have a son.

Amanda was diagnosed with breast cancer in January 2023. The pair raised over $75,000 for local breast cancer charities during the 2023 baseball season, all while Amanda was in treatment.
