= St. Anne's Episcopal School =

Coordinates: 39°26′21″N 75°41′59″W

St. Anne's Episcopal School is a private school in Middletown, Delaware.

The school was founded in 2001 by educators from St. Andrew's School in Middletown. The school has two classes in grades Pre-K to 8th. There is also a preschool. The school promotes diversity and gives out 750,000 dollars annually in financial aid.

St Anne's has a girls field hockey, male and female basketball, male and female soccer, co-ed cross country, boys and girls lacrosse, and girls volleyball teams. The school's first headmaster was Harvey Zendt. Peter Thayer replaced him in 2008.
