= Shane O'Neill (tattoo artist) =

American tattoo artist

- Born: 1972 (age 53–54); Aldan, Pennsylvania
- Education: University of the Arts
- Occupation: Tattoo artist
- Known for: Winner of the Ink Master season 1

Shane O'Neill (born 1972) is an American tattoo artist from Middletown, Delaware. He is best known for winning the first season of Ink Master and is nationally recognized for being an expert in black-and-gray portraits and realism tattoos.

== History ==
O'Neill attended the University of the Arts in Philadelphia, where he earned a Bachelor of Fine Arts. He then worked as a freelance illustrator. O'Neill began tattooing in 1997, with his artwork being featured in tattoo magazines such as Tattoo Society, Rise Magazine, and Wet Red Ink.

During Ink Master, O'Neill was never in the bottom three and wasn't up for elimination until the final episode where only three contestants remained. He won "Best Tattoo of the Day" in episodes 3, 6, and 7. In the final episode, O'Neill produced a Japanese style tattoo and a colored skull tattoo and won.

In March 2012, the Middletown Town Council gave a proclamation in honor of O'Neill's win. Also in 2012, he participated as a member of the jury for the Chaudesaigues Award, which recognizes excellence in tattooing.

O'Neill has been featured at as a high-profile guest at many tattoo conventions and has even organized tattoo conventions himself. In February 2012, he organized a "Best in the Midwest" convention in Council Bluffs, Iowa, and in July 2013, organized "the Gambling Rose" convention in Cincinnati. He also launched his own company, System One Tattoo Products, which sells items related to tattoo care and piercing.

== Personal life ==
O'Neill lives in Middletown, Delaware with his wife and three daughters.
