= Abbey Curran =

American model (born 1987)

- Born: Abbey Nicole Curran; 28 July 1987 (age 39)
- Beauty pageant titleholder
- Title: Miss Iowa USA 2008 (Winner)
- Hair color: Brunette
- Eye color: Blue
- Major competition: Miss USA 2008

Abbey Nicole Curran (born 28 July 1987) is an American beauty pageant contestant from Davenport, Iowa, who competed in the Miss USA pageant in 2008 as Miss Iowa USA. Curran is the chairwoman of her own non-profit pageant "The Miss You Can Do It Pageant" for young girls and women with special needs. The HBO documentary film Miss You Can Do It (2013) is about her work with this pageant.

== Miss USA 2008 ==
Curran, then 20, represented Iowa at the Miss USA 2008 pageant in Las Vegas, held on April 11, 2008, where she competed against District of Columbia and fifty other delegates. Curran was the first contestant with a disability. Curran was born with cerebral palsy. She also made an appearance on The Ellen DeGeneres Show, CBS' The Early Show, Inside Edition, Access Hollywood, Extra, and CNN Headline News. She also had an exclusive feature story in People Magazine.

== Personal life ==
Curran grew up on a farm in Kewanee, Illinois. Curran is a graduate of Kewanee High School and St. Ambrose University. She is also a past Easter Seals ambassador. She received physical therapy services for cerebral palsy at the Easter Seals Peoria Service Center for many years when she was a child.

Preceded by Dani Reeves	Miss Iowa USA; 2008	Succeeded by Chelsea Lynn Gauger
