= Appoquinimink School District =

Public school district in Delaware, United States

The Appoquinimink School District is a public school district in southern New Castle County, Delaware. The district office is located in the Odessa Park Building, 118 S. Sixth Street, in Odessa, Delaware, with Matthew Burrows as the current superintendent. Former superintendent Tony Marchio retired in June 2011. The district is growing by nearly 600 students every year, making it the fastest growing school district in Delaware.

In addition to Odessa it serves Middletown, Townsend, and a portion of Glasgow.

== History ==
Middletown School District 60 and Odessa School District 61 merged into the Appoquinimink district effective July 1, 1969.

In 1983 Olive B. Loss, a teacher, was voted in as superintendent by all members of the school board.

== Schools ==
High schools (9-12)

- Appoquinimink High School (Middletown)
- Middletown High School (Middletown)
- Odessa High School (New Castle County)

Middle schools (6-8)

- Alfred G. Waters Middle School
  - Waters was a 9th grade-only school for one year while AHS was being built, then opened as a 6-8 grade school in fall 2008. It has 25 classrooms and a 500 seat auditorium. The building, which had its dedication ceremony in 2007, was named after a principal of the Ninth Grade Academy, a woman
- Everett Meredith Middle School
  - Meredith opened as the grades 1-12 Middletown School in 1929. Its building previously housed MHS building until it moved to its current location in 1997. EMMS is named after a teacher and houses Appoquinimink Adult Continuing Education programs at night. The original building was completely demolished in 2020 and is being rebuilt from the ground up under the same name, which has finished construction and opened in late August 2022.
- Louis L. Redding Middle School
  - Middletown 120C opened in 1952 as a segregated 1-9 school for Black students. That school was replaced by Louis L. Redding Comprehensive High School in 1953. Its namesake was Louis L. Redding. That building became Redding Middle School.
- Cantwell's Bridge Middle School (built/opened 2020)

Elementary schools (1-5)

- Brick Mill Elementary
- Bunker Hill Elementary
  - Opened in 2009. This school features movable classroom walls that can be reconfigured to support a variety of learning needs, learning pods anchoring each wing with technology stations and tiered reading nooks, indoor and outdoor stages, a broadcast and recording room, and a cafeteria design that features smaller seating groups and improved acoustics. It is the district's first two-story elementary school.
- Cedar Lane Elementary
- Crystal Run Elementary (built/opened 2023)
- Lorewood Grove Elementary
- Old State Elementary
- Olive B. Loss Elementary (located in Glasgow)
- Silver Lake Elementary
  - In 1998 the school district did a program where 21 kindergarten students were put in a program with smaller class sizes, which resulted in higher student success.
- Townsend Elementary
  - The 1998 smaller classes experiment was also done at Townsend.

Early childhood centers

- Appoquinimink Early Childhood Center
- Brick Mill Early Childhood Center
- Cedar Lane Early Childhood Center
- Spring Meadow Early Childhood Center
- Townsend Early Childhood Center

== Facilities ==
The former Odessa School No. 61 houses the district headquarters.

The Marion Proffitt Training Center is in Odessa.
