= Miss Delaware USA =

Beauty pageant competition

- Formation: 1952
- Type: Beauty pageant
- Headquarters: Wilmington
- Location: Delaware
- Members: Miss USA
- Official language: English
- Key people: Vincenza Carrieri-Russo
- Website: Official website

Miss Delaware USA is the pageant that selects the representative for the state of Delaware in the Miss USA pageant, and the name of the title held by its winner. The pageant is directed by V&M Productions.

Delaware had not placed in Miss USA until 2015, where Renee Bull placed in the Top 10. This is additionally Delaware's first, most recent, and only placement.

The current Miss Delaware USA is Julia Hatoum of Newark and was crowned on June 28, 2026, at Laird Performing Arts Center of The Tatnall School in Wilmington. Hatoum will represent Delaware at Miss USA 2026.

== Gallery of titleholders ==
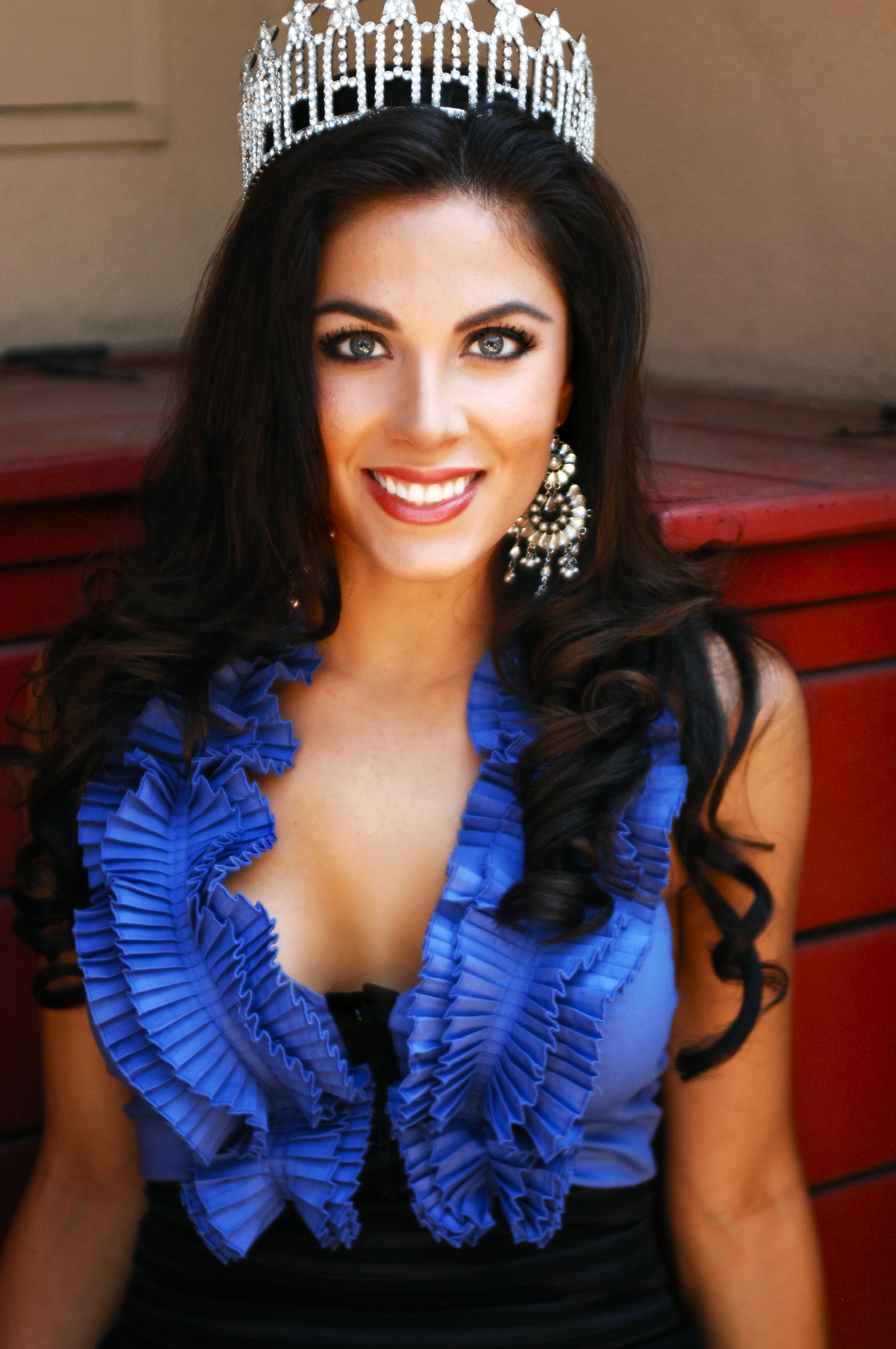
Nicole Bosso, Miss Delaware USA 2007

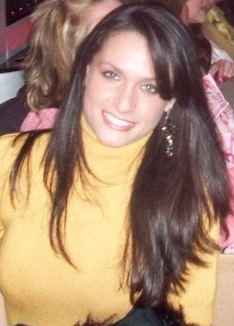
Vincenza Carrieri-Russo, Miss Delaware USA 2008

== Results summary ==
=== Placements ===
- Top 11: Renee Bull (2015)

Delaware has only placed once.

=== Awards ===
- Miss Congeniality: Renee Bull (2015), Tetra Shockley (2025)

== Winners ==
Color key

- Winner
- Runner-Up
- Semifinalist

Year	Name	Hometown	Age (Note: Age at the time of crowning)	Local title	Placement at Miss USA	Special awards at Miss USA	Notes
2026	Julia Hatoum	Newark	24	Miss Newark			
2025	Tetra Shockley	Camden	44	Miss Camden		Miss Congeniality	The oldest person to compete at Miss USA
2024	Alysa Bainbridge	Newark	25	Miss Newark			Previously Miss Pennsylvania's Outstanding Teen 2016; Previously Miss Pennsylvania 2022
2023	Noa A. Mills	Middletown	25	Miss Middletown			
2022	Grace Lange	Newark	22	Miss Greenville			Previously Miss Delaware Teen USA 2017
2021	Drew Naomi Sanclemente	Odessa	24	Miss Odessa			
2020	Katherine "Katie" Guevarra	Middletown	26				
2019	Jolisa Copeman	Middletown	24				
2018	Sierra Wright	Wilmington	20				Previously Miss Delaware Teen USA 2015; Contestant on Survivor 47
2017	Mia Jones	Bear	20				Previously Miss Delaware Teen USA 2014; Top 15 at Miss Teen USA 2014
2016	Alexandra Vorontsova	Newark	20				
2015	Renee Bull	Middletown	21		Top 11	Miss Congeniality	
2014	Kelsey Miller	Wilmington	23				Previously Miss Delaware Teen USA 2009
2013	Rachel Baiocco	Bear	21				
2012	Krista Clausen	Georgetown	18				
2011	Katie Hanson	Newark	20				Contestant on Survivor: Philippines
2010	Julie Citro	Wilmington	26				
2009	Kate Banaszak	Middletown	24				
2008	Vincenza Carrieri-Russo	Newark	23				
2007	Nicole Bosso	Newark	20				Contestant on Crowned: The Mother of All Pageants
2006	Ashlee Greenwell	Middletown	18				
2005	Sheena Benton	Wilmington	23				
2004	Courtney Purdy	Newark	21				
2003	Cheryl Crowe	Felton	23				Previously Miss Delaware Teen USA 1997
2002	Deborah Hoffman	Ocean View	25				
2001	Stacey Smith	Ocean View	26				
2000	Jennifer Behm	Wilmington	23				Winner of season two of MasterChef
1999	Jackie Pilla	Wilmington					
1998	Sherri Davis	New Castle					
1997	Patricia Gauani	Dover					
1996	Star Behl	Claymont					
1995	Nicole Garis	Wilmington					
1994	Teresa Kline	Bear					
1993	Annmarie Correll	Hockessin					
1992	Julie Ann Griffith	Wilmington					
1991	Laurie Lucidonio	Wilmington					
1990	Nicci Dent	Bear					
1989	Terri Spruill	Wilmington					
1988	Christina Lee Angel	Millsboro					
1987	Shellie Haralson	Newark					
1986	Lynn Taylor	Bear					
1985	Sheila Saints	Wilmington	21				
1984	Denise Lennick	Wilmington	19				
1983	Shelley Perkins	Newark					
1982	Shawna Saints	Wilmington					
1981	Natalie Ramsey	Wilmington					
1980	Karen Giobbe	Hockessin					
1979	Lisa Toothman	Newark					
1978	Donna Lewis	New Castle	19				
1977	Debby Faulkner	Wilmington					
1976	Debbie Kucher	Newark					
1975	Sandy McClure	Wilmington					
1974	Cheryl Fetkenher	Newark					
1973	Linda Graves	Wilmington					
1972	Michele Voyer	Wilmington					
1971	Nanette Crist	Wilmington					
1970	Marilyn O'Neill	Newark					
1969	Marsha Stoppel	Wilmington					
1968	Diana Parker	Wilmington					
1967	Dianne Judefind	Wilmington					
1966	Jacqueline Kalazinskas	Claymont					
1965	Shirl Chappell	Newark					
1964	Christina Klose	Wilmington					
1963	Susan Kowalski	Newport					
Did not compete in 1962
1961	Ninea Lou Ringler	Dagsboro					
1960	Rose Ann Reed	Wilmington					
1959	Linda E. Humes	Harrington					
1958	Virginia Jefferson	Delmar					
1957	Patricia Ellingsworth	Millsboro					
1956	Sandra McCabe	Selbyville					
1955	Helen Denise Blackwell	Wilmington					
Did not compete between 1953 and 1954
1952	Sue J. Langton	Wilmington					
