= Miss USA 2008 =

57th Miss USA pageant

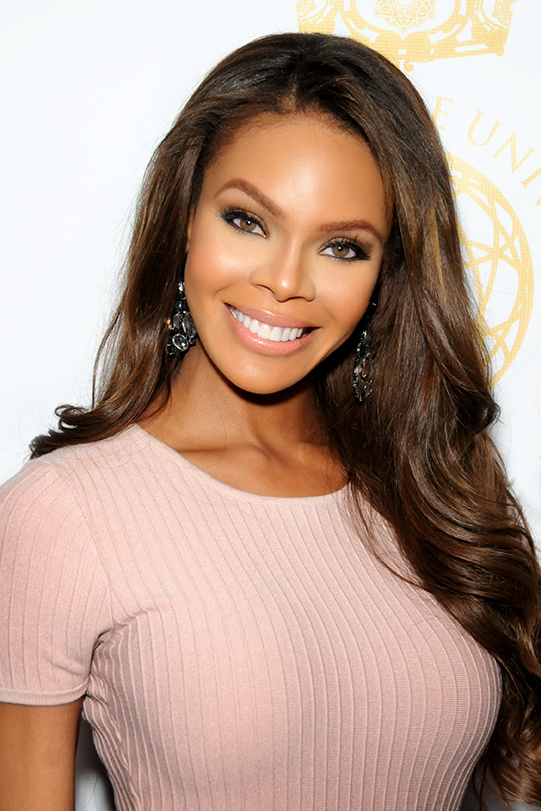
- Miss USA 2008 Crystle Stewart
- Date: April 11, 2008
- Presenters: Donny Osmond; Marie Osmond
- Entertainment: Finger Eleven
- Venue: The AXIS, Paradise, Nevada
- Broadcaster: NBC (KVBC); Telemundo (KBLR)
- Entrants: 51
- Placements: 15
- Winner: Crystle Stewart; Texas

Miss USA 2008 was the 57th Miss USA pageant, held at The AXIS in Paradise, Nevada, on April 11, 2008. At the conclusion of the final night of competition, Crystle Stewart of Texas was crowned the winner by outgoing titleholder Rachel Smith of Tennessee. Crystle represented the United States at the Miss Universe 2008 pageant, which was held in Vietnam, where she placed in the Top 10. This was also the first time in the pageant's 56-year history that two consecutive women of African Americans have been crowned.

The pageant was held at the Theatre for the Performing Arts, a 7,000-seat theater located in the Planet Hollywood Resort and Casino. The theater was also the location of Miss Universe 1991 and 1996 pageants. This is the first time that the Miss USA pageant was held in Nevada.

For the first time, the competition was broadcast in High Definition.

Brother/sister duo Donny and Marie Osmond hosted the live telecast for the first time, and Finger Eleven performed their single "Paralyzer". Rihanna's song Umbrella was used during the evening gown competition.

During the final show on April 11, the fifteen delegates with the highest average scores from the preliminary competition were announced. The top fifteen competed in the swimsuit competition. The top ten delegates from swimsuit competed in evening gown. The top five delegates from the evening gown competition (not averaged composite scores from both competitions) competed in the final question round to determine the winner. The judges' composite score was shown after each round of competition for only the second time since 2002.

== Delegates ==
State	Contestant	Hometown	Age (Note: Ages at the time of the pageant)	Height	Placement	Award	Notes
Alabama	Keisha Walding	Dothan	24	5'10"			
Alaska	Courtney Erin Carroll	Fairbanks	25	5'7"		Miss Photogenic	
Arizona	Kimberly Joiner	Gilbert	22	5'8"			
Arkansas	Rachel Howells	Alma	21	5'10"			
California	Raquel Beezley	Barstow	21	5'8"	Top 15		
Colorado	Beckie Hughes	Grand Junction	21	5'9"			
Connecticut	Jacqueline Honulik	Fairfield	21	5'8"			
Delaware	Vincenza Carrieri-Russo	Newark	23	5'7"			
District of Columbia	Chelsey Sophia Rodgers	Washington, D.C.	24	5'8"			
Florida	Jessica Rafalowski	DeLand	22	5'10"	Top 10		
Georgia	Amanda Kozak	Warner Robins	23	5'10"			Previously Miss Georgia 2006
Hawaii	Jonelle Layfield	Kaneʻohe	23	5'10"			Sister of Ashley Layfield, Miss Hawaii 2007
Idaho	Tracey Brown	Post Falls	21	5'9"			Previously Miss Idaho 2005
Illinois	Shanon Lersch	Chicago	25	5'10"			
Indiana	Brittany Mason	Anderson	21	5'10"	Top 10		
Iowa	Abbey Curran	Davenport	20	5'5"			First person with disability to compete at Miss USA
Kansas	Michelle Gillespie	Mission Hills	22	5'11"			Great-great niece of Margaret Gorman, Miss America 1921
Kentucky	Alysha Harris	Lexington	20	5'4"			
Louisiana	Michelle Berthelot	Hammond	24	5'6"			
Maine	Kaetlin Parent	Van Buren	20	5'8"			Previously Miss Maine Teen USA 2005
Maryland	Casandra Tressler	Damascus	22	5'9"			Later Miss United States International 2010
Massachusetts	Jacqueline Bruno	Assonet	23	5'10"	Top 10		Previously Miss Massachusetts Teen USA 2003
Michigan	Elisabeth Crawford	Canton	25	5'8"			
Minnesota	Kaylee Unverzagt	Eagan	20	5'10"	Top 15		
Mississippi	Leah Laviano	Ellisville	20	5'4"	1st runner-up		
Missouri	Candice Crawford	Columbia	21	5'8"	Top 10		Sister of actor Chace Crawford
Montana	Tori Wanty	Shelby	21	5'4"			
Nebraska	Micaela Johnson	Omaha	23	5'5"			
Nevada	Veronica Grabowski	Henderson	23	5'6"			
New Hampshire	Breanne Silvi	Nashua	24	5'4"			
New Jersey	Tiffany Andrade	Linden	22	5'5"	2nd runner-up		
New Mexico	Raelene Aguilar	Sunland Park	26	5'8"			Previously Miss New Mexico Teen USA 2000
New York	Danielle Roundtree	New York City	20	5'11"			
North Carolina	Andrea Duke	Saluda	26	5'11"			
North Dakota	Stephanie Tollefson	New Rockford	21	5'8"			
Ohio	Monica Day	Grove City	25	5'9"		Miss Congeniality	
Oklahoma	Lindsey Jo Harrington	Frederick	22	5'10"	3rd runner-up		
Oregon	Mary Horch	Corvallis	24	5'7"			
Pennsylvania	LauRen Merola	Pittsburgh	23	5'8"	4th runner-up		
Rhode Island	Amy Diaz	Johnston	23	5'6"	Top 15		Previously Miss Rhode Island Teen USA 2001; Later Miss Earth United States 2009; Later contestant on The Amazing Race 23 and won
South Carolina	Jamie Hill	Columbia	24	5'6"	Top 15		Contestant on The Amazing Race 10
South Dakota	Charlie Buhler	Mitchell	20	5'5"			First African American Miss South Dakota USA
Tennessee	Hailey Laine Brown	Franklin	25	5'9"	Top 10		
Texas	Crystle Stewart	Missouri City	26	5'9"	Winner		Top 10 at Miss Universe 2008; placed 8th
Utah	Julia Bachison	North Ogden	24	5'7"	Top 15		Previously Miss Utah 2005
Vermont	Kim Tantlinger	Burlington	22	5'7"			
Virginia	Tori Hall	Roanoke	21	5'8"			Previously Miss Virginia Teen USA 2005; Cast member on Road Rules 2007: Viewers' Revenge and The Gauntlet 3
Washington	Michelle Font	Renton	26	5'7"			
West Virginia	Skylene Montgomery	Parkersburg	23	5'7"			
Wisconsin	Michelyn Cynthia Butler	Madison	25	5'8"			
Wyoming	Cassie Shore	Casper	22	5'5"			

== Contestant gallery ==
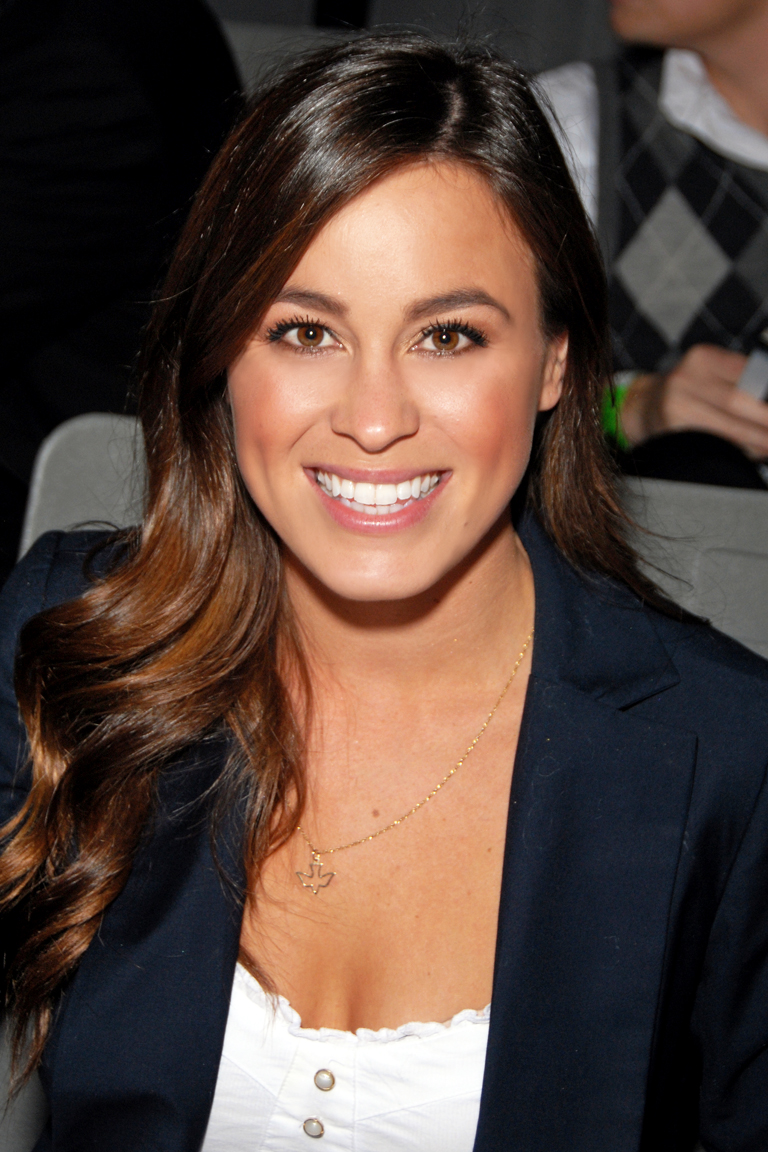
Raquel Beezley
Miss California USA 2008

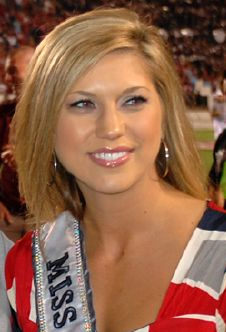
Keisha Walding
Miss Alabama USA 2008

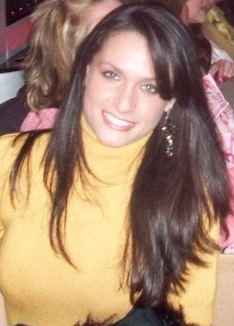
Vincenza Carrieri-Russo
Miss Delaware USA 2008

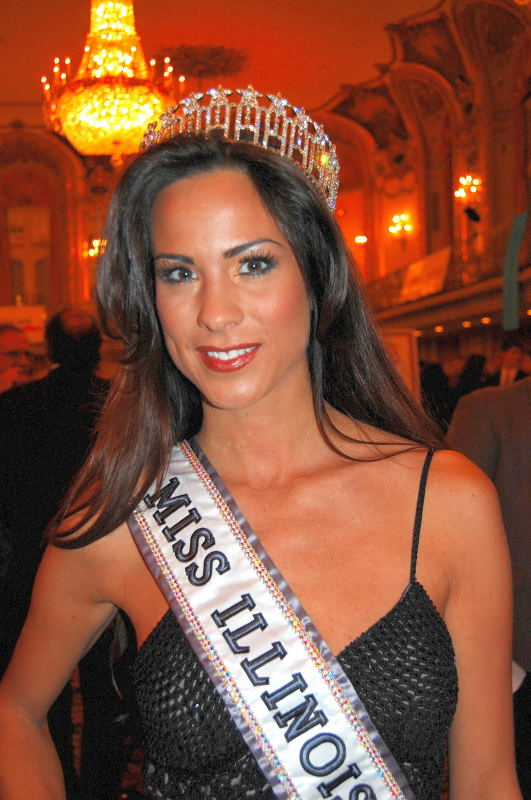
Shanon Lersch
Miss Illinois USA 2008

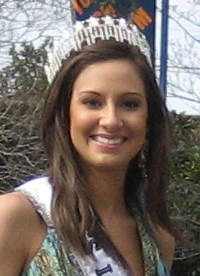
Michelle Berthelot
Miss Louisiana USA 2008

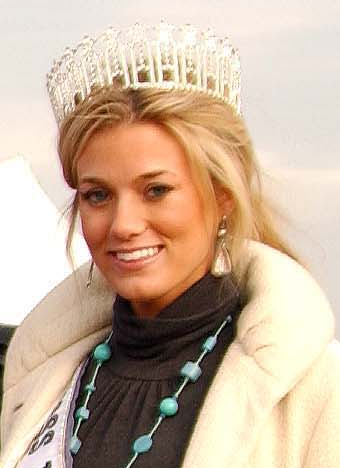
Casandra Tressler
Miss Maryland USA 2008

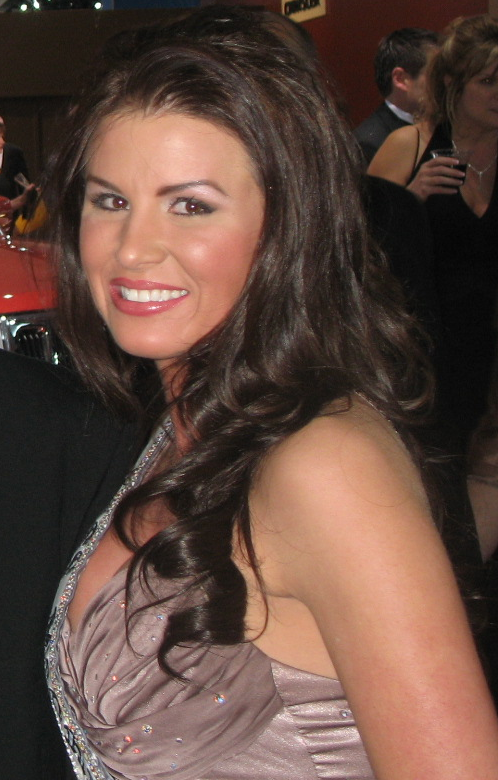
Elisabeth Crawford
Miss Michigan USA 2008

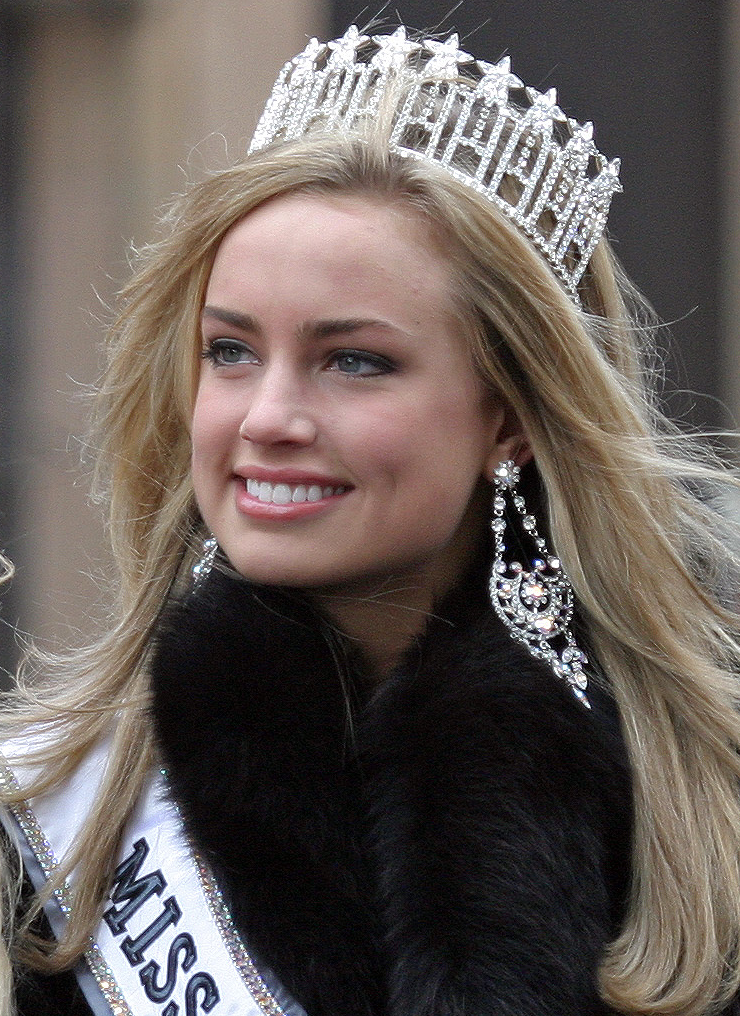
Kaylee Unverzagt
Miss Minnesota USA 2008

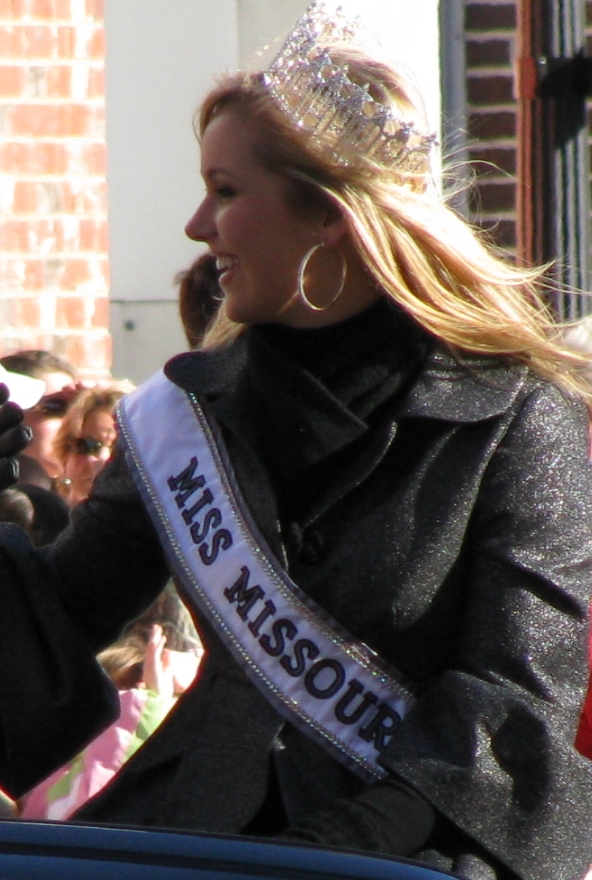
Candice Crawford
Miss Missouri USA 2008

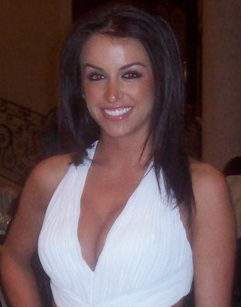
Veronica Grabowski
Miss Nevada USA 2008

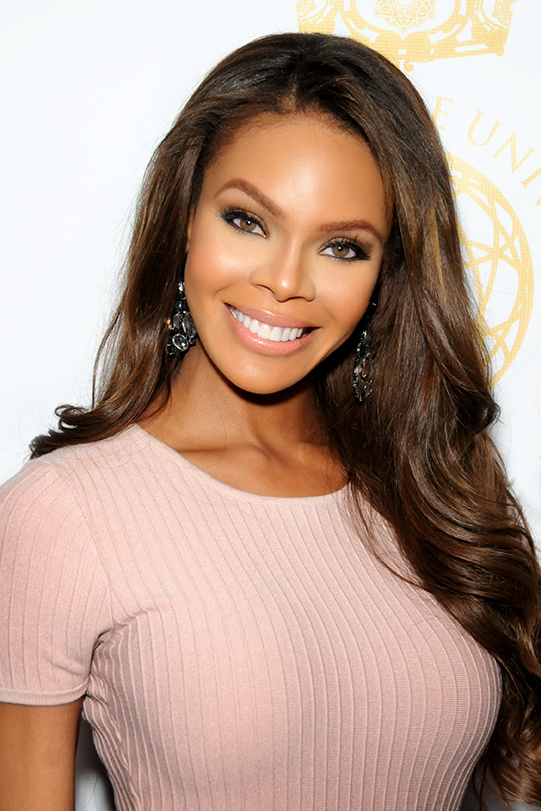
Crystle Stewart (2008 winner)
Miss Texas USA 2008

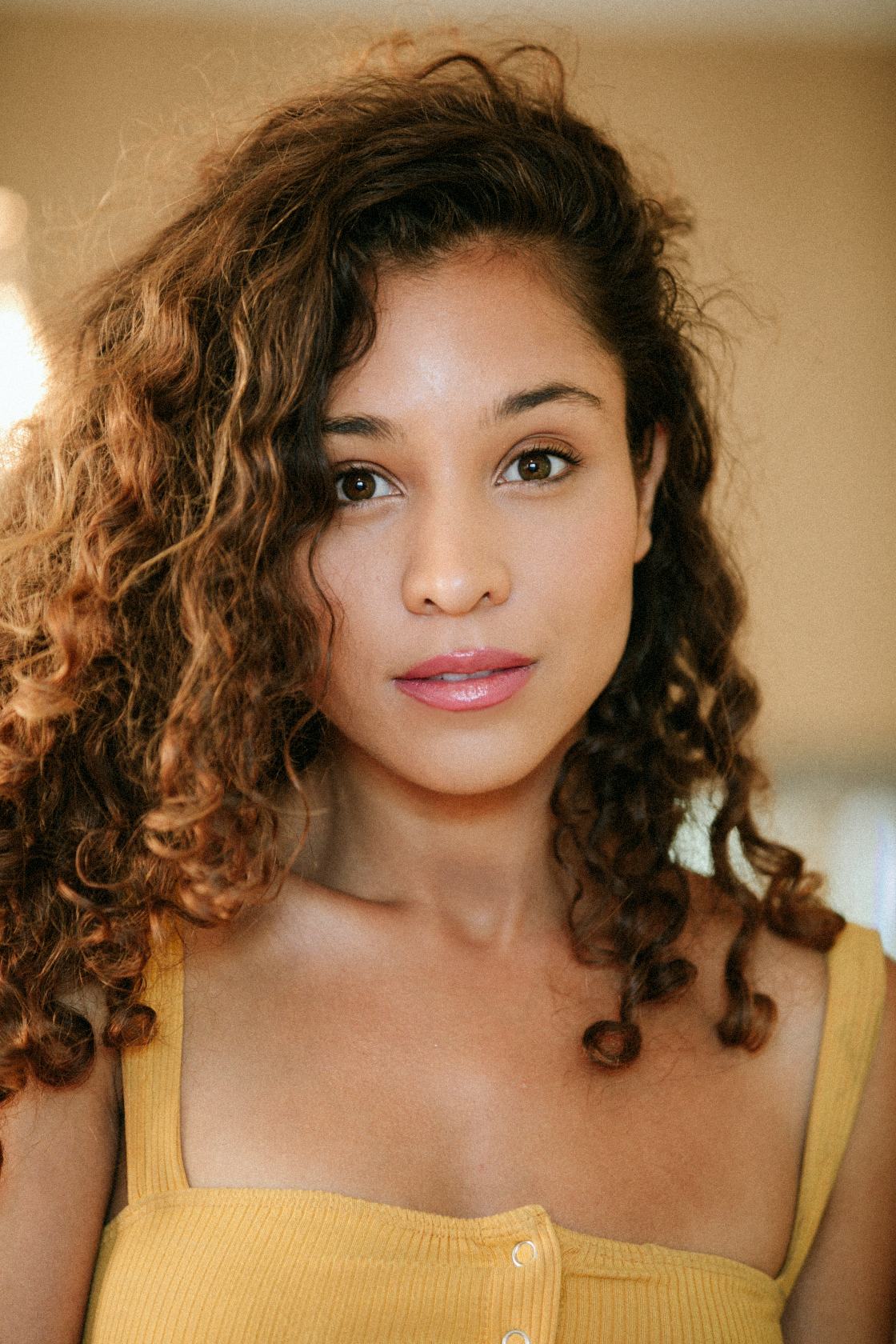
Charlie Buhler Miss South Dakota USA 2008

== Contestant notes ==
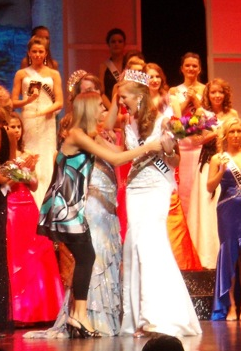
Michelle Gillespie is crowned Miss Kansas USA 2008

- Due to accounting errors, Christina Silva was crowned Miss California USA. When the mistake was discovered a week after the pageant, the real winner Raquel Beezley assumed the title.
- Michelle Gillespie, Miss Kansas USA, is the great-great niece of Miss America 1921, Margaret Gorman of Washington, DC.
- Three contestants previously competed in the Miss Texas USA and/or Miss Texas Teen USA pageants before winning titles in other states:
  - Candice Crawford (Missouri) placed third runner-up at Miss Texas Teen USA 2003 and 2005. She is the sister of Gossip Girl actor Chace Crawford.
  - Elisabeth Crawford (Michigan) was a non-finalist at Miss Texas USA 2004 to 2006
  - Veronica Grabowski (Nevada) competed at the Miss Texas Teen USA 2003 and Miss Texas USA 2007 pageants, finishing as a semifinalist in both years.
- Amy Diaz (Rhode Island) and Danielle Roundtree (New York) competed at Miss Florida USA 2007. Diaz placed third runner-up and Roundtree was a non-finalist.
- Abbey Curran (Iowa) was the first contestant with a disability. Curran was born with cerebral palsy.
- Amy Diaz (Rhode Island) competed at Miss Earth 2009 in Boracay, Philippines but unplaced.

== See also ==
- Miss USA 2007
- Miss Universe 2008
- Miss Teen USA 2008
