= Townsend, Delaware =

- Town
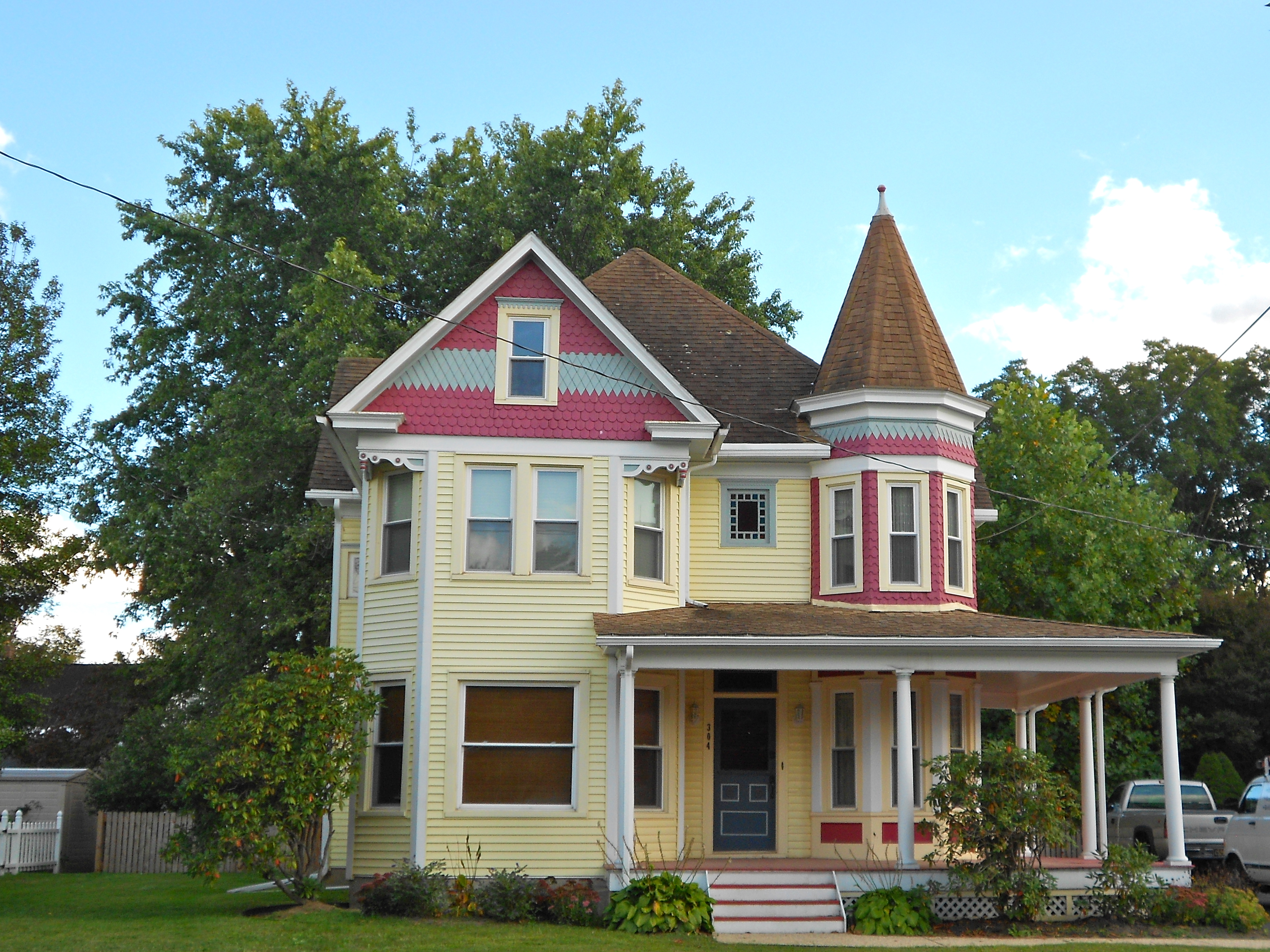
- House on Main Street

- Flag Seal

- Location of Townsend in New Castle County, Delaware.

- Location within the state of Delaware Townsend (the United States)
- Coordinates: 39°23′42″N 75°41′30″W
- Country: United States
- State: Delaware
- County: New Castle
- Incorporated: 1885

Government
  - Mayor: Scott Lobdell, P.E.

Area
  - Total: 1.04 sq mi (2.69 km^{2})
  - Land: 1.03 sq mi (2.68 km^{2})
  - Water: 0 sq mi (0.00 km^{2})
- Elevation: 69 ft (21 m)

Population (2020)
  - Total: 2,717
  - Density: 2,622.0/sq mi (1,012.36/km^{2})
- Time zone: UTC−5 (Eastern (EST))
  - Summer (DST): UTC−4 (EDT)
- ZIP code: 19734
- Area code: 302
- FIPS code: 10-72510
- GNIS feature ID: 214755
- Website: townsend.delaware.gov

Townsend is a town in New Castle County, Delaware, United States. As of the 2020 census, Townsend had a population of 2,717. The center of population of Delaware is located in Townsend.

== Geography ==
Townsend is located at 39°23′42″N 75°41′30″W (39.3951115, –75.6915973).

According to the United States Census Bureau, the town has a total area of 0.6 square miles (1.6 km^{2}), all land.

== History ==
Townsend was incorporated as a town on April 3, 1885.

The name comes from a businessman and Delaware Democrat, Samuel John Townsend. Prior to 1885, the town was known as Charley Town. Between 1845 and 1855 brothers Samuel and John Townsend purchased several large tracts of farmland in the vicinity. The Delaware Railroad arrived here in 1856, bisecting Samuel Townsend's property. This led to a period of sustained growth for the town, as the railroad station became the principal shipping point for the area's agricultural products. In September 1856 the Post Office was established, and the first hotel opened in 1857. The station was named Townsend after the area's major land owners. The peach industry was a vital contributor to the area's growth and prosperity until disease destroyed many Delmarva orchards in the late 19th century. A free African American community was located there by the mid-19th century.

The town has since created a "Comprehensive Development Plan", as required by state law February 2003, for land preservation.

The Townsend Historic District, which includes 216 buildings, was listed on the National Register of Historic Places in 1986.

=== Mayors of the town ===
Note: List of Mayors is incomplete. Please add cited sources to complete this list.

- 0000?–2007: Charles Murry (Town Records)
- 2007(?)–2009: Dave Raughley
- 2010–2011: John Hanlin
- 2011–2012: Steve High
- 2012–2014: Joel Esler
- 2014–2015: Jermaine Hatton
- 2016–2019: Rudy Sutton
- 2019–2021: Tom McDonald
- 2021–2022: Patrick Miller
- 2022–present: Scott Lobdell, P.E.

== Infrastructure ==
=== Transportation ===
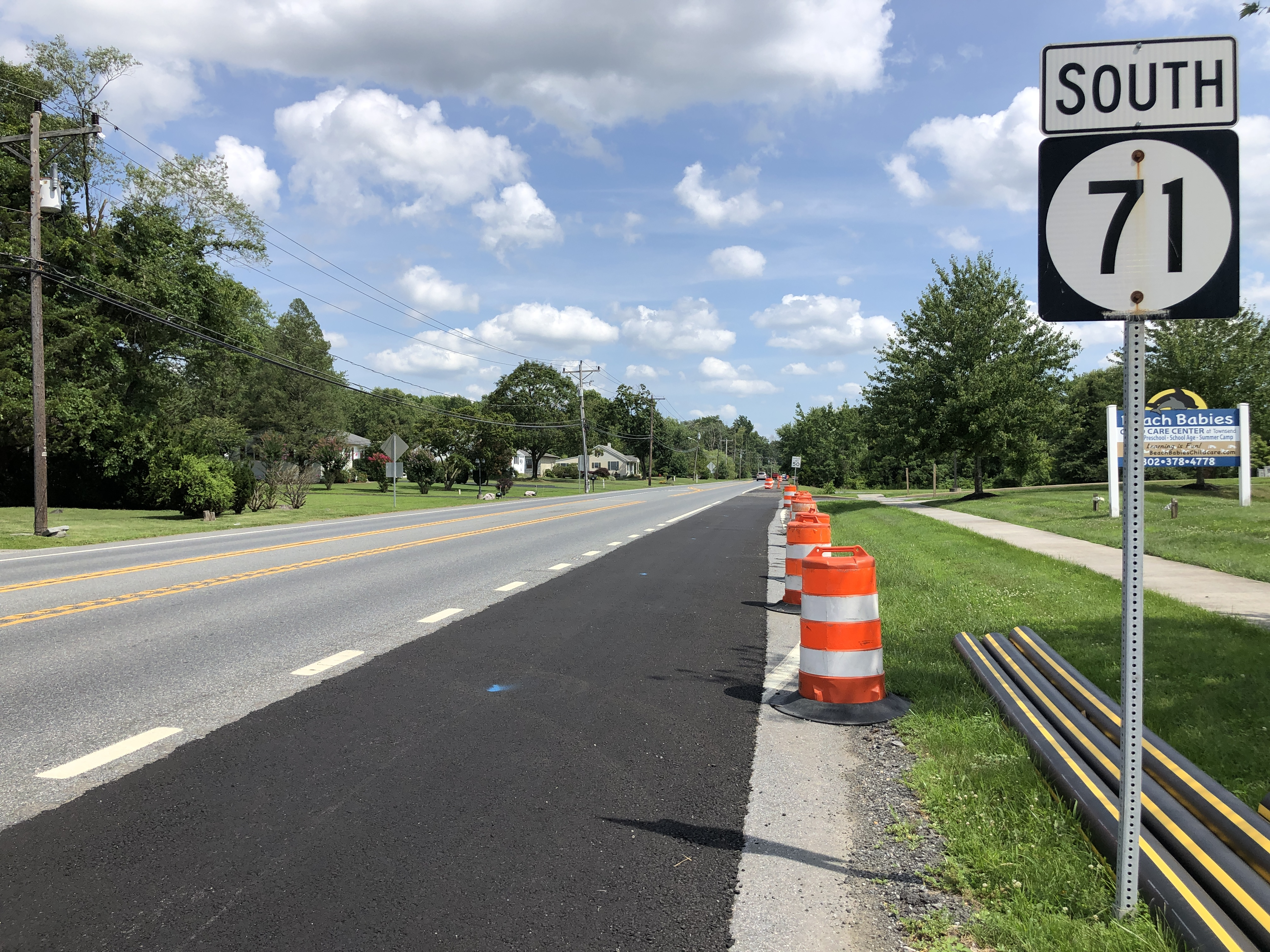
DE 71 southbound in Townsend

Delaware Route 71 runs northwest–southeast through the eastern part of Townsend. Main Street is the main east–west road through Townsend. Townsend is at the junction of the Delmarva Central Railroad's Delmarva Subdivision and the Maryland and Delaware Railroad's Northern Line.

=== Utilities ===
Delmarva Power, a subsidiary of Exelon, provides electricity to Townsend. Chesapeake Utilities provides natural gas to the town. Artesian Water Company, a subsidiary of Artesian Resources, provides water to Townsend. Trash and recycling collection in Townsend is provided by Waste Industries.

== Education ==
Townsend is within the Appoquinimink School District. Odessa High School has a Townsend postal address.

MOT Charter School is an area charter school.

== Demographics ==
Historical population
Census	Pop.	Note	%±
1880	199		—
1890	387		94.5%
1900	399		3.1%
1910	494		23.8%
1920	453		−8.3%
1930	421		−7.1%
1940	544		29.2%
1950	441		−18.9%
1960	434		−1.6%
1970	505		16.4%
1980	386		−23.6%
1990	322		−16.6%
2000	346		7.5%
2010	2,049		492.2%
2020	2,717		32.6%
U.S. Decennial Census

=== 2020 census ===
As of the 2020 census, Townsend had a population of 2,717. The median age was 33.6 years. 31.5% of residents were under the age of 18 and 6.9% of residents were 65 years of age or older. For every 100 females there were 98.2 males, and for every 100 females age 18 and over there were 98.6 males age 18 and over.

0.0% of residents lived in urban areas, while 100.0% lived in rural areas.

There were 766 households in Townsend, of which 64.2% had children under the age of 18 living in them. Of all households, 68.8% were married-couple households, 10.7% were households with a male householder and no spouse or partner present, and 13.3% were households with a female householder and no spouse or partner present. About 6.8% of all households were made up of individuals and 2.0% had someone living alone who was 65 years of age or older.

There were 797 housing units, of which 3.9% were vacant. The homeowner vacancy rate was 0.6% and the rental vacancy rate was 5.2%.

Racial composition as of the 2020 census
Race	Number	Percent
White	1,497	55.1%
Black or African American	878	32.3%
American Indian and Alaska Native	6	0.2%
Asian	41	1.5%
Native Hawaiian and Other Pacific Islander	5	0.2%
Some other race	51	1.9%
Two or more races	239	8.8%
Hispanic or Latino (of any race)	163	6.0%

=== 2000 census ===
At the 2000 census there were 346 people, 132 households, and 95 families living in the town. The population density was 582.3 inhabitants per square mile (224.8/km^{2}). There were 151 housing units at an average density of 254.1 per square mile (98.1/km^{2}). The racial makeup of the town was 84.10% White, 11.56% African American, 0.87% Native American, 0.87% Asian, 2.60% from other races. Hispanic or Latino of any race were 2.60%.

Of the 132 households 36.4% had children under the age of 18 living with them, 59.1% were married couples living together, 9.8% had a female householder with no husband present, and 28.0% were non-families. 20.5% of households were one person and 7.6% were one person aged 65 or older. The average household size was 2.62 and the average family size was 3.06.

The age distribution was 26.9% under the age of 18, 7.8% from 18 to 24, 32.1% from 25 to 44, 20.5% from 45 to 64, and 12.7% 65 or older. The median age was 36 years. For every 100 females, there were 92.2 males. For every 100 females age 18 and over, there were 88.8 males.

The median household income was $47,500 and the median family income was $48,875. Males had a median income of $27,250 versus $28,409 for females. The per capita income for the town was $17,671. About 2.1% of families and 1.7% of the population were below the poverty line, including none of those under age 18 and 8.7% of those age 65 or over.

== Notable people ==
- Samuel John Townsend (1812–1881), for whom the town was named
- Happy Townsend (1879–1963), baseball player
- David P. Buckson (1920–2017), Governor of Delaware, was born in Townsend
