= Middletown, Delaware =

Middletown
- Town
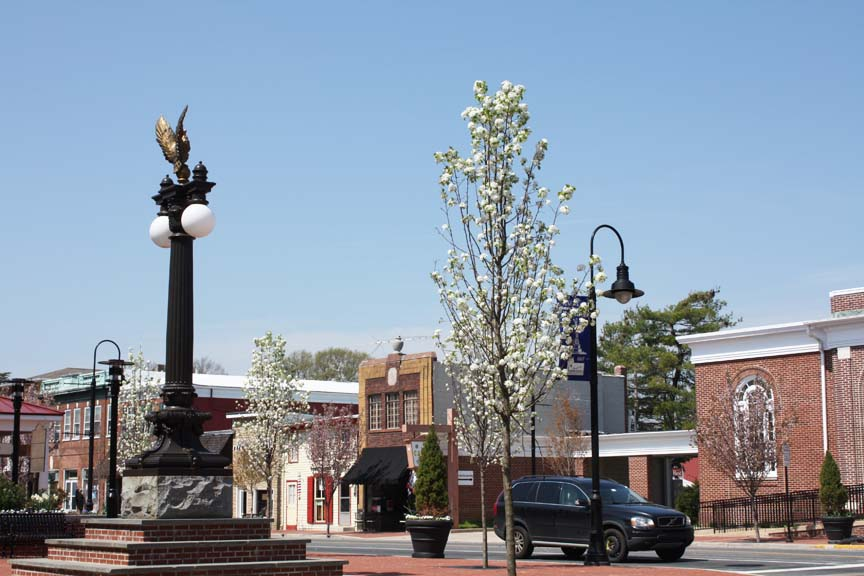
- Four corners at the main intersection of Middletown

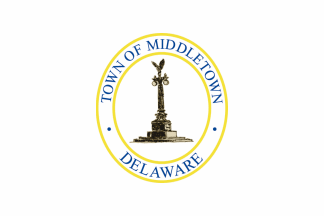
- Flag Seal
- Nickname: Diamond Town of the Diamond State
- Location of Middletown in New Castle County, Delaware.

- Location within the state of Delaware Middletown (the United States)
- Coordinates: 39°26′58″N 75°42′59″W
- Country: United States
- State: Delaware
- County: New Castle
- Incorporated: 1861

Government
  - Mayor: Ken Branner
  - Vice Mayor: Aaron Blythe

Area
  - Total: 12.64 sq mi (32.75 km^{2})
  - Land: 12.51 sq mi (32.41 km^{2})
  - Water: 0.13 sq mi (0.34 km^{2})
- Elevation: 66 ft (20 m)

Population (2020)
  - Total: 23,192
  - Density: 1,853.3/sq mi (715.56/km^{2})
- Time zone: UTC−5 (Eastern (EST))
  - Summer (DST): UTC−4 (EDT)
- ZIP code: 19709
- Area code: 302
- FIPS code: 10-47030
- GNIS feature ID: 214304
- Website: www.middletown.delaware.gov

Middletown is a town in New Castle County, Delaware, United States. According to the 2021 Census, the population of the town is 24,164.

== Geography and climate ==
Middletown is located at 39°26′58″N 75°42′59″W (39.4495560, –75.7163207) with an elevation of 66 feet (20.1 m).

According to the United States Census Bureau, the town has a total area of 11.61 square miles (30.1 km^{2}), of which 11.61 square miles (30.1 km^{2}) is land and 0.16% is water.

Climate data for Middletown, Delaware
Month	Jan	Feb	Mar	Apr	May	Jun	Jul	Aug	Sep	Oct	Nov	Dec	Year
Record high °F (°C)	71 (22)	75 (24)	81 (27)	93 (34)	93 (34)	104 (40)	104 (40)	100 (38)	100 (38)	91 (33)	82 (28)	73 (23)	104 (40)
Mean daily maximum °F (°C)	41 (5)	45 (7)	55 (13)	65 (18)	75 (24)	83 (28)	87 (31)	86 (30)	80 (27)	68 (20)	57 (14)	46 (8)	66 (19)
Mean daily minimum °F (°C)	24 (−4)	26 (−3)	33 (1)	42 (6)	52 (11)	61 (16)	65 (18)	64 (18)	57 (14)	45 (7)	37 (3)	29 (−2)	45 (7)
Record low °F (°C)	−15 (−26)	−15 (−26)	1 (−17)	8 (−13)	31 (−1)	39 (4)	46 (8)	43 (6)	34 (1)	21 (−6)	15 (−9)	−6 (−21)	−15 (−26)
Average precipitation inches (mm)	3.17 (81)	2.60 (66)	3.71 (94)	3.48 (88)	4.04 (103)	3.59 (91)	3.96 (101)	3.21 (82)	3.50 (89)	3.80 (97)	3.31 (84)	3.31 (84)	41.68 (1,060)
Average snowfall inches (cm)	4.8 (12)	5.8 (15)	1.2 (3.0)	0.1 (0.25)	0 (0)	0 (0)	0 (0)	0 (0)	0 (0)	0 (0)	0.2 (0.51)	2.4 (6.1)	14.5 (36.86)

== Infrastructure ==
=== Transportation ===
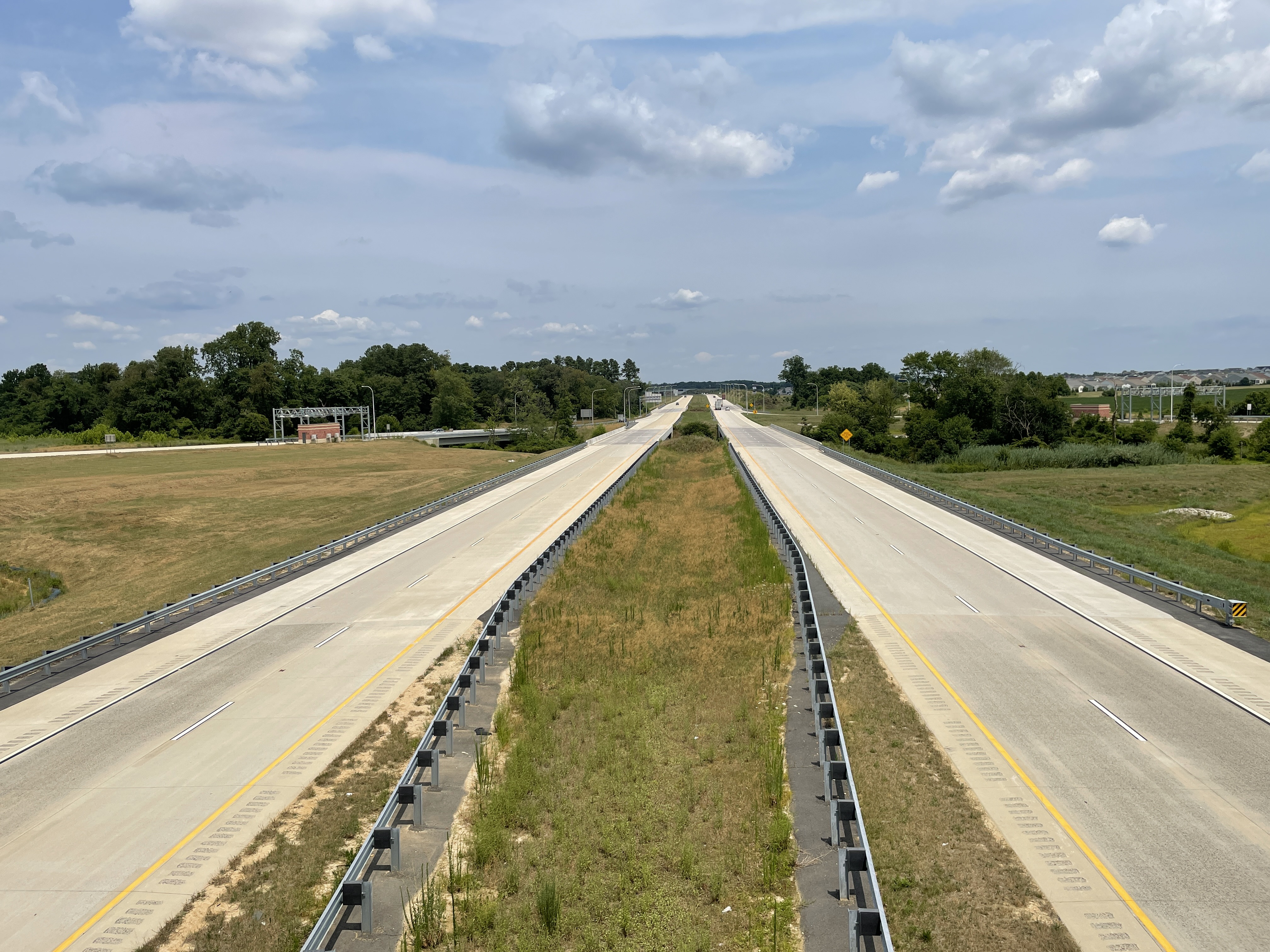
US 301 northbound at the DE 299 interchange in Middletown

The Delaware Route 1 toll road passes along the east edge of Middletown, and the town has a signed exit at Odessa for Delaware Route 299. The U.S. Route 301 toll road is just west and north of Middletown, serving the Chesapeake Bay Bridge to the southwest. US 301 has exits for Middletown at DE 299 west of town and Delaware Route 71 north of town. DE 71 passes north–south through Middletown on Broad Street and heads north to the Summit Bridge and south to Townsend and U.S. Route 13. DE 299 passes east–west through Middletown on Main Street. Delaware Route 15, a rural road, is concurrent with DE 299 at Middletown, allowing access to Dover and Smyrna.

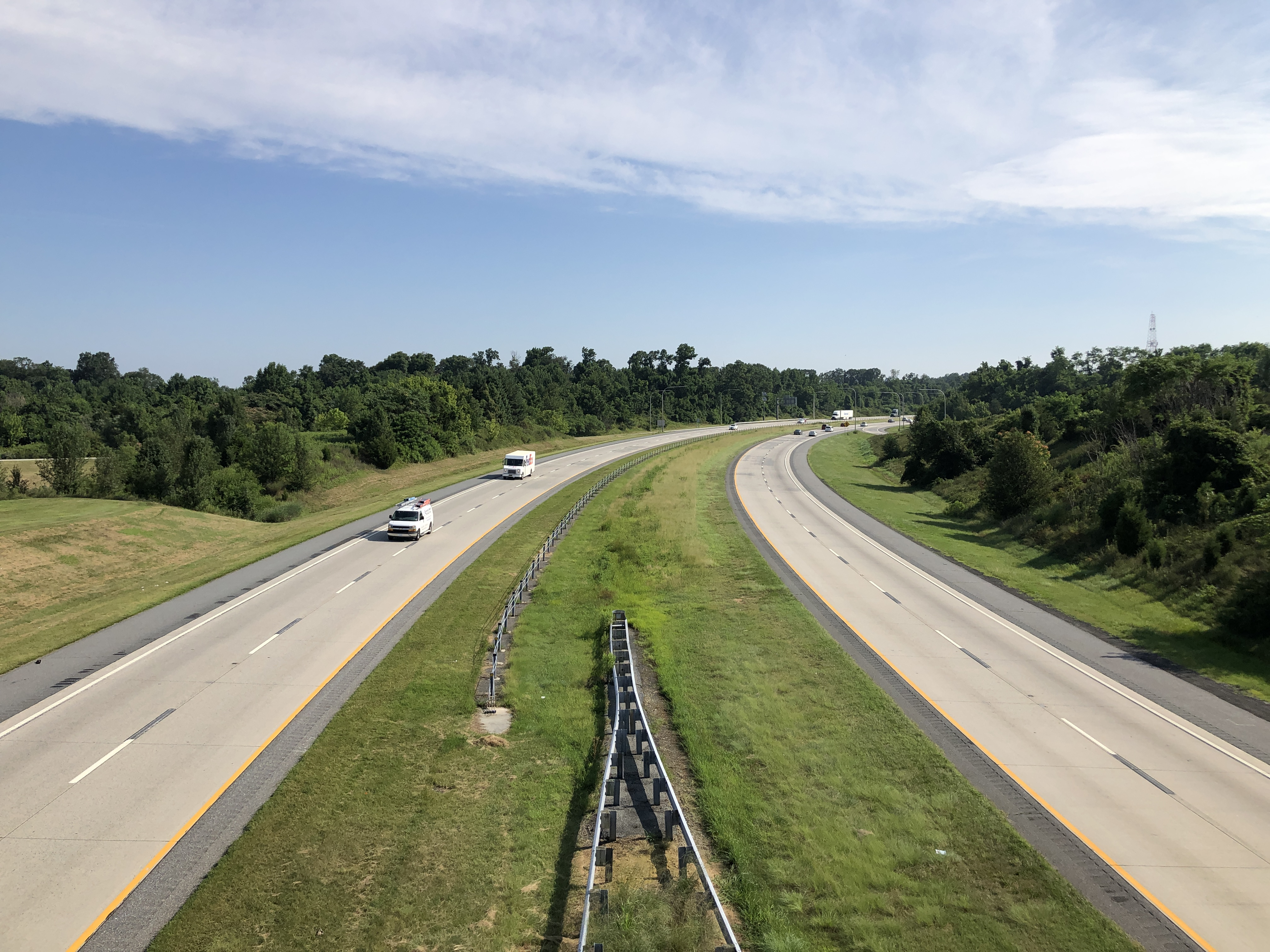
DE 1 northbound on the east edge of Middletown

DART First State serves Middletown along the Route 46 bus, which runs between a park and ride in Odessa and the Newark Transit Hub in Newark, passing through Middletown and serving the Amazon fulfillment center. From the park and ride lot in Odessa, riders have access to the Route 301 bus to Wilmington and Dover and the seasonal Route 305 "Beach Connection" bus to Lewes. The Route 37 bus provides rush hour weekday and Saturday service between the Amazon fulfillment center in Middletown and Wilmington via the Christiana Mall. The Route 302 bus provides intercounty service between a park and ride lot in North Middletown and Dover via Middletown, serving the Amazon fulfillment center. Cecil Transit operates a Demand Response route twice a month between Cecilton, Maryland and Middletown, providing residents of southern Cecil County access to shopping and healthcare in Middletown.

The Delmarva Central Railroad's Delmarva Subdivision line runs through the center of Middletown.

Summit Airport is just to the north of the town. The larger Wilmington Airport is in New Castle, with very limited commercial air service. The nearest airport with extensive commercial air service is the Philadelphia International Airport in Philadelphia, Pennsylvania.

=== Utilities ===
The Town of Middletown Electric Department provides electricity to the town. The electric department is a member of the Delaware Municipal Electric Corporation. The town maintains an electric substation, with electricity supplied to the substation by a 138,000 kV line from Delmarva Power's Mt. Pleasant Substation. A second 138,000 kV line to the town's substation is being constructed from Delmarva Power's Townsend Substation to increase the reliability of electricity in Middletown. The Water/Wastewater Department provides water and sewer service to Middletown. Trash Tech provides trash collection and recycling to Middletown. Natural gas service in Middletown is provided by Chesapeake Utilities.

=== Health care ===
Christiana Care Health System operates the Middletown Free-standing Emergency Department in Middletown, offering 24-hour emergency care with 18 treatment rooms. It opened in April 2013 at a cost of $34 million.

== Education ==
Public education in Middletown is provided by the Appoquinimink School District, which has recently built a new elementary school, Old State Elementary, to accommodate the population growth of the area and overcrowding at the other elementary schools. Even more recently, a new middle school, Cantwells Bridge, and a new high school, Odessa High School were built. Overcrowding at Middletown High School, which was over-capacity by 400 students during the 2005–2006 school year, resulted in the construction of a second high school, Appoquinimink High School, which opened in Fall 2008, as well as a third high school, Odessa High School, which opened in 2020.

Middletown School District 60 and Odessa School District 61 merged into the Appoquinimink district effective July 1, 1969.

Louis L. Redding Comprehensive High School provided education to students of black African descent in the period before educational desegregation in the United States. Middletown School District 120 operated Redding during the period 1953 to 1966. Desegregation occurred after 1966.

The St. Georges Technical High School is located to the northeast of the town. MOT Charter School has two buildings, a high school to the northeast, and a K–8 building in the southwest.

Two private schools are located on the side of the town: St. Anne's Episcopal School, which offers grades K-8, and St. Andrew's School, a coed boarding school affiliated with the Episcopal Diocese of Delaware.

Wilmington University had a location in town.

== Demographics ==
Historical population
Census	Pop.	Note	%±
1850	368		—
1860	523		42.1%
1870	915		75.0%
1880	1,280		39.9%
1890	1,454		13.6%
1900	1,567		7.8%
1910	1,399		−10.7%
1920	1,260		−9.9%
1930	1,247		−1.0%
1940	1,529		22.6%
1950	1,755		14.8%
1960	2,191		24.8%
1970	2,644		20.7%
1980	2,946		11.4%
1990	3,834		30.1%
2000	6,161		60.7%
2010	18,871		206.3%
2020	23,192		22.9%
U.S. Decennial Census

=== Racial and ethnic composition ===
Middletown town, Delaware – Racial and ethnic composition Note: the US Census treats Hispanic/Latino as an ethnic category. This table excludes Latinos from the racial categories and assigns them to a separate category. Hispanics/Latinos may be of any race.
Race / Ethnicity (NH = Non-Hispanic)	Pop 2000	Pop 2010	Pop 2020	% 2000	% 2010	% 2020
White alone (NH)	4,413	10,978	11,494	71.63%	58.17%	49.56%
Black or African American alone (NH)	1,298	5,247	7,072	21.07%	27.80%	30.49%
Native American or Alaska Native alone (NH)	4	23	19	0.06%	0.12%	0.08%
Asian alone (NH)	48	706	1,298	0.78%	3.74%	5.60%
Native Hawaiian or Pacific Islander alone (NH)	1	8	4	0.02%	0.04%	0.02%
Other race alone (NH)	0	58	141	0.00%	0.31%	0.61%
Mixed race or Multiracial (NH)	71	455	1,097	1.15%	2.41%	4.73%
Hispanic or Latino (any race)	326	1,396	2,067	5.29%	7.40%	8.91%
Total	6,161	18,871	23,192	100.00%	100.00%	100.00%

=== 2020 census ===
As of the 2020 census, Middletown had a population of 23,192. The median age was 37.1 years. 27.5% of residents were under the age of 18 and 13.5% of residents were 65 years of age or older. For every 100 females there were 88.9 males, and for every 100 females age 18 and over there were 84.9 males age 18 and over.

99.0% of residents lived in urban areas, while 1.0% lived in rural areas.

There were 8,049 households in Middletown, of which 44.5% had children under the age of 18 living in them. Of all households, 53.1% were married-couple households, 12.4% were households with a male householder and no spouse or partner present, and 28.0% were households with a female householder and no spouse or partner present. About 19.2% of all households were made up of individuals and 8.3% had someone living alone who was 65 years of age or older.

There were 8,399 housing units, of which 4.2% were vacant. The homeowner vacancy rate was 1.3% and the rental vacancy rate was 3.4%.

Racial composition as of the 2020 census
Race	Number	Percent
White	11,873	51.2%
Black or African American	7,278	31.4%
American Indian and Alaska Native	49	0.2%
Asian	1,306	5.6%
Native Hawaiian and Other Pacific Islander	4	0.0%
Some other race	931	4.0%
Two or more races	1,751	7.6%

=== 2000 census ===
As of the census of 2000, there were 6,161 people, 2,298 households, and 1,631 families residing in the town. The population density was 962.4 inhabitants per square mile (371.6/km^{2}). There were 2,514 housing units at an average density of 392.7 per square mile (151.6/km^{2}). The racial makeup of the town was 94.42% White, 1.30% African American, 0.11% Native American, 0.78% Asian, 0.02% Pacific Islander, 1.93% from other races, and 1.44% from two or more races. Hispanic or Latino of any race were 5.29% of the population.

There were 2,298 households, out of which 41.3% had children under the age of 18 living with them, 48.5% were married couples living together, 18.1% had a female householder with no husband present, and 29.0% were non-families. 22.9% of all households were made up of individuals, and 8.5% had someone living alone who was 65 years of age or older. The average household size was 2.68 and the average family size was 3.14.

In the town, the population was spread out, with 30.9% under the age of 18, 9.5% from 18 to 24, 33.5% from 25 to 44, 18.3% from 45 to 64, and 7.9% who were 65 years of age or older. The median age was 31 years. For every 100 females, there were 90.7 males. For every 100 females age 18 and over, there were 85.7 males.

The median income for a household in the town was $41,663, and the median income for a family was $47,270. Males had a median income of $35,688 versus $30,044 for females. The per capita income for the town was $18,517. About 8.8% of families and 10.9% of the population were below the poverty line, including 12.7% of those under age 18 and 13.6% of those age 65 or over.

== Growth ==
Recent annexations of land have stimulated Middletown's growth; it is known as the fastest growing area in Delaware. Between 2000 and 2010, the population of the town grew 206.3%. Many affluent housing developments surround the town's center, especially to its north, attracting, among others, commuters from Wilmington, and even Philadelphia.

Middletown's commerce has grown accordingly. National retail and food chain stores have opened locations in the area, with significant growth along the U.S. 301 corridor. An Amazon fulfillment center is located in Middletown. This growth is more characteristic of suburban sprawl, a stark difference from Middletown's historic growth patterns.

As a result of the rapid growth of the area, Middletown established its own police force, The Middletown Police Department, on July 2, 2007. The Police Department officially began on October 3, 2007, with a foundation of 20 officers from surrounding Delaware police departments.

== Events ==
Middletown is home to the Olde Tyme Peach Festival, an annual tradition that attracts tens of thousands of visitors each August. Main Street in the center of town is closed to traffic and activities begin with a parade down the street. Other entertainment includes local art and historical exhibits, live music, crafts, games, and a variety of food including limited time peach flavored treats. There is also a 5k run/walk on the same day of the festival, where all proceeds are donated to benefit the local sports boosters.

Middletown hosts the M.O.T. Big Ball Marathon, an annual Labor Day event that benefits local charities. The marathon runs 24 hours straight where people of all ages come out to play baseball on previously registered teams with an oversized softball, giving it the name "Big Ball". In 2013 the marathon had its most successful year, raising a record $65,000 in funds over the 24 hours.

Middletown also hosts an annual Hummers parade. The parade's name is a spoof of the nearby Philadelphia Mummers parade. As opposed to the Mummers, which is judged seriously, the Hummers dress up and make fun of all the popular news headlines, political, celebrity, and local happenings of the year.

== Media ==
The Middletown Transcript is the main publication for the Middletown, Odessa and Townsend area. The first edition was printed on January 4, 1868. This community newspaper is published every Thursday.

== Film appearances ==
The 1989 coming-of-age drama film Dead Poets Society directed by Peter Weir and starring Robin Williams and Ethan Hawke was filmed almost entirely on the school grounds at St. Andrew's School. The theatre scene was filmed at The Everett Theatre on Main Street.

The episode of The West Wing entitled "Two Cathedrals" (#44) was partly filmed at St. Andrew's School.

== Notable people ==
- Dennis C. Blair (born 1947), former Director of National Intelligence and retired United States Navy Admiral, attended St. Andrew's School
- John H. Brown Jr. (1891–1963), decorated Vice admiral in the U.S. Navy
- Erin Burnett (born 1976), journalist, attended St. Andrew's School
- Marquis Dendy (born 1992), Olympic long jumper
- Kalil ElMedkhar (born 1999), soccer player
- Chris Godwin (born 1996), wide receiver for the Tampa Bay Buccaneers of the National Football League
- Stephanie Hansen (born 1961), Delaware state senator
- Dwayne Henry (born 1962), former Major League Baseball pitcher
- Chad Kuhl (born 1992), Major League Baseball pitcher Pittsburgh Pirates
- Morgan Hurd (born 2001), artistic gymnast and 2017 World all-around champion
- Reggie Leach (born 1950), former Philadelphia Flyers forward
- Shane O'Neill (born 1972), winner of the first season of Ink Master
- Maggie Rogers (born 1994), singer, attended St. Andrew's School
- Silas Simmons (1895–2006), longest-lived professional baseball player in history
- Loudon Wainwright III (born 1946), folk singer
- Benjamin T. Biggs (born 1821), former Delaware Governor
- John P. Cochran (born 1809) former Delaware Governor
