= Dwayne Henry =

American baseball player (born 1962)

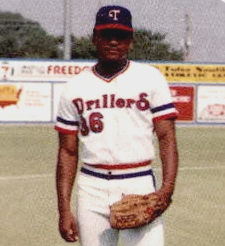
- Henry with the Tulsa Drillers c. 1984
- Pitcher
- Born: February 16, 1962 (age 64); Elkton, Maryland, U.S.
- Batted: Right Threw: Right

Professional debut
- MLB: September 7, 1984, for the Texas Rangers
- NPB: April 13, 1994, for the Chunichi Dragons

Last appearance
- MLB: September 30, 1995, for the Detroit Tigers
- NPB: October 4, 1994, for the Chunichi Dragons

MLB statistics
- Win–loss record: 14–15
- Earned run average: 4.65
- Strikeouts: 275

NPB statistics
- Win–loss record: 3–7
- Earned run average: 3.48
- Strikeouts: 70
- Stats at Baseball Reference

Teams
- Texas Rangers (1984–1988); Atlanta Braves (1989–1990); Houston Astros (1991); Cincinnati Reds (1992–1993); Seattle Mariners (1993); Chunichi Dragons (1994); Detroit Tigers (1995)

Dwayne Allen Henry (born February 16, 1962) is a former Major League Baseball (MLB) relief pitcher who played for the Texas Rangers, Atlanta Braves, Houston Astros, Cincinnati Reds, Seattle Mariners and Detroit Tigers. In 1994, he pitched in Japan for the Chunichi Dragons.

Henry was named the Delaware high school male athlete of the year in 1980 by The Philadelphia Inquirer, playing baseball, basketball, and football. He planned to play college football for the North Carolina Tar Heels before the Rangers selected him in the second round of the 1980 MLB draft.

Henry had Tommy John surgery in the minors in 1982. Henry made his major league debut on September 7, 1984, striking out Chris Speier for his first major league strikeout while walking three in one inning. Henry converted from a starting pitcher to a relief role in June 1985. He earned three saves with the Rangers that year. He missed much of 1986 with another elbow injury.

Texas traded Henry and cash to Atlanta for Dave Henry on March 30, 1989. Atlanta released him after the 1990 season, and he signed with Houston in 1991. Henry later played in MLB for Cincinnati in 1992 and 1993, Seattle in 1993, and Detroit in 1995, with his stint in Nippon Professional Baseball for the Chunichi in 1994. His MLB tenure ended when the Tigers released him on October 12, 1995. Henry played in the Chinese Professional Baseball League for the Wei Chuan Dragons in 1997 and 1998 and Chinatrust Whales in 2000. He also played in Minor League Baseball for the Colorado Rockies in 1996, in the Atlantic League of Professional Baseball for the Somerset Patriots in 1998 and 1999 and the Newark Bears in 2001, and in the Mexican League for the Broncos de Reynosa in 2001.

Henry was inducted into the Delaware Sports Hall of Fame in 2011.
