= Odessa High School (Delaware) =

Location
- 570 Tony Marchio Dr; Townsend, Delaware 19734; United States
- 39°26′18″N 75°39′04″W

Information
- Type: Public
- Established: 2020 (6 years ago)
- School district: Appoquinimink School District
- CEEB code: 080018
- Principal: Deangello Eley
- Teaching staff: 74.00 (FTE)
- Grades: 9-12
- Enrollment: 1,190 (2023–2024)
- Student to teacher ratio: 16.08
- Colors: Green and yellow
- Mascot: Ducks
- Website: www.odessahs.org

Odessa High School is a public high school in unincorporated New Castle County, Delaware. It has a Townsend postal address, while its name refers to nearby Odessa. It is a part of the Appoquinimink School District. The ducks are the mascot.

It is a part of the Fairview K-12 Campus, which is on a former corn field and also includes the Old State Elementary School and Spring Meadow Early Childhood Center. It shares its building with Cantwell's Bridge Middle School.

== History ==
The Appoquinimink district began developing the complex circa 2010.

The district selected the duck mascot in 2017. The building had a cost of $148 million. Groundbreaking began in January 2018.

Construction completed in fall 2020 and opened with grade 9 students. As the COVID-19 pandemic in Delaware occurred, the initial students did virtual learning. The athletic teams began in November 2020.
