= Olivia Jordan =

American actress, model and TV host

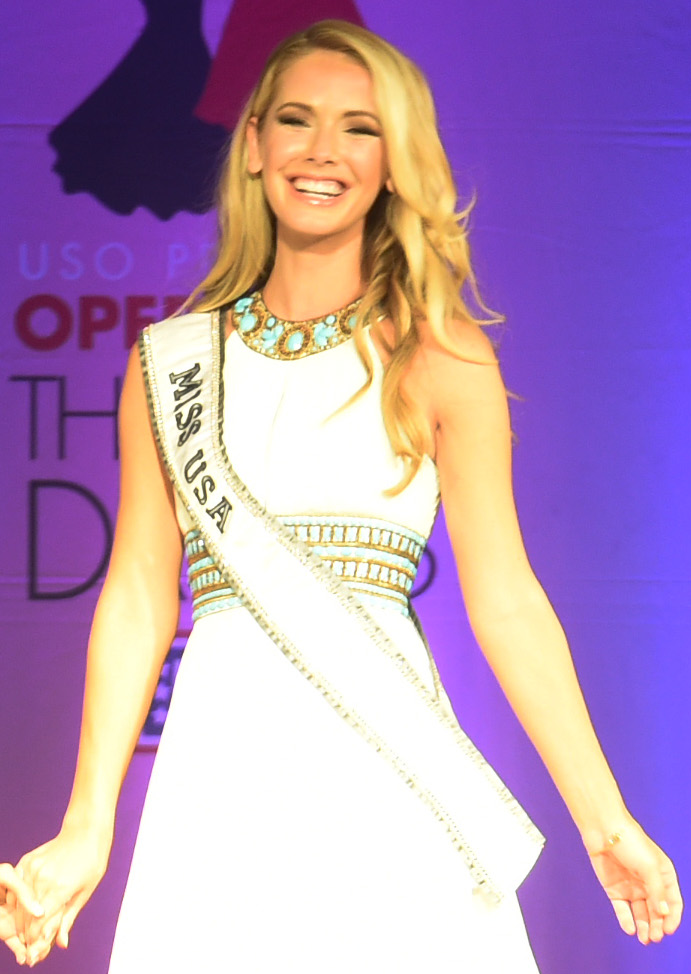
- Jordan in 2015
- Born: Olivia Jordan Thomas; September 28, 1988 (age 38); Tulsa, Oklahoma, U.S.
- Education: Boston University (BS)
- Occupations: Actress; model; television presenter
- Height: 5 ft 11 in (180 cm)
- Spouse: Jay Hector (m. 2019)
- Children: 1
- Beauty pageant titleholder
- Title: Miss Beverly Hills USA 2013; Miss World America 2013; Miss Oklahoma USA 2015; Miss USA 2015
- Eye color: Blue
- Major competitions: Miss World America 2013; (Winner); Miss World 2013; (Top 20); Miss Oklahoma USA 2015; (Winner); Miss USA 2015; (Winner); Miss Universe 2015; (2nd Runner-Up)

Olivia Jordan Thomas (born September 28, 1988) is an American actress and beauty pageant titleholder who was crowned Miss USA 2015. Jordan later represented the United States at Miss Universe 2015, where she was finished as the second runner-up. She had been crowned Miss Oklahoma USA 2015, and is the first and only woman from Oklahoma to win Miss USA.

Jordan additionally was crowned Miss World America 2013 and represented the United States at Miss World 2013, where she placed in the Top 20.

== Early life and education ==
Olivia Jordan Thomas was born on September 28, 1988, to Bob and Jill Thomas and raised in Tulsa, Oklahoma. She is a fourth generation Tulsan, and attended Bishop Kelley High School. After graduating, Jordan moved to Boston, Massachusetts to attend Boston University. While a college student, Jordan became SAG-eligible through featured extra work in the movies Ted and Here Comes the Boom. While becoming a SAG member, Jordan learned that someone had already used the name "Olivia Thomas", and began using Jordan as her professional surname. She graduated in May 2011 with a Bachelor of Science in health sciences, and then moved to Los Angeles to pursue a career in modeling and acting.

== Career ==
=== Pageantry ===
Jordan represented Beverly Hills in the Miss California USA 2013 on January 13, 2013, where she finished as first runner-up to Miss California USA 2013, Mabelynn Capeluj. Later that year, Jordan was appointed as Miss World America 2013 and competed at Miss World 2013, where she finished in the top 20 Megan Young from Philippines was the winner and was also first runner-up for Top Model.

On December 21, 2014, Jordan won the title of Miss Oklahoma USA 2015. She later won the title of Miss USA 2015 on July 12, 2015, in Baton Rouge, Louisiana, making her the first entrant from Oklahoma to win and the first winner from the South since Kristen Dalton won representing North Carolina in Miss USA 2009. Her question as a Miss USA finalist asked who she would choose as an American woman to put on the next new bill design. She named Harriet Tubman. On April 20, 2016, the U.S. Treasury officially announced that it had chosen Tubman to be featured on the new $20 bill. During her reign, Donald Trump sold his stake in the Miss Universe Organization ending his affiliation with the beauty pageant. Jordan represented the United States in the Miss Universe 2015 pageant held on December 20, 2015, where she was named the second runner-up and Pia Wurtzbach was the winner. Jordan wore a custom Berta Bridal dress to the evening gown portion of the competition, and was chosen among the top ten dressed in the competition. Her national costume was that of a superhero based on a bald eagle, the national bird of the United States.

Jordan was the third person from the United States to compete at two major international beauty pageants after Brucene Smith, who competed in Miss World 1971 and won Miss International 1974, and Andrea Neu, who previously competed at Miss International 2013 and Miss Earth 2014. However, she had the distinction of being the first woman to represent the United States at two of the largest and oldest international pageants in the world: Miss World and Miss Universe.

== Personal life ==
In August 2018, Jordan became engaged to British actor Jay Hector, and they later married in November 2019. They have one child.

=== Politics ===
After finishing her reign as Miss USA 2015, Jordan was vocal about her political beliefs. During the 2016 United States presidential election, Jordan was an outspoken critic of Republican candidate Donald Trump, and supported Democratic candidate Hillary Clinton. Following the 2019 passage of the Human Life Protection Act in Alabama and the Georgia heartbeat bill, Jordan publicly stated that she was molested as a child and raped as a teenager, and since "decisions were made for [her] body without [her] consent", she saw the passage of heartbeat bills as no different from her experience.

== Filmography ==
Television
Year	Title	Role	Notes
2023	Miss Universe 2022	Herself	Preliminary judge

Awards and achievements
Preceded by (Ukraine) Diana Harkusha	Miss Universe 2nd Runner-Up; 2015	Succeeded by (Colombia) Andrea Tovar
Preceded by Nia Sanchez (Nevada)	Miss USA; 2015	Succeeded by Deshauna Barber (D.C.)
Preceded by Brooklynne Young	Miss Oklahoma USA; 2015	Succeeded by Alexandra Miller
Preceded by Claudine Book (California)	Miss World America; 2013	Succeeded by Elizabeth Safrit (North Carolina)
