= List of school districts in Delaware =

This is a complete list of school districts in the US state of Delaware.

All school districts in Delaware are independent governments. Delaware does not have any school systems dependent on another layer of government.

== Public school districts ==
- Appoquinimink School District
- Brandywine School District
- Caesar Rodney School District
- Cape Henlopen School District
- Capital School District
- Christina School District
- Colonial School District
- Delmar School District
- Indian River School District
- Lake Forest School District
- Laurel School District
- Milford School District
- New Castle County Vocational-Technical School District (County-wide overlay school district)
- Polytech School District (County-wide overlay school district)
- Red Clay Consolidated School District
- Seaford School District
- Smyrna School District
- Sussex Technical School District (County-wide overlay school district)
- Woodbridge School District

== Direct state schools ==
- Delaware School for the Deaf/Margaret S. Sterck School (Operated under contract to the Christina School District)
- Ferris School (Operated by state Youth Rehabilitative Services)
- First State School (Operated under contract to Christiana Care Health System)
- George Washington Carver Vocational School (Closed in 1953)
- James H. Groves Adult High School (Operated directly by state Department of Education)

== Historical Districts ==
Prior to 1968, there were 50 school districts in the state. This changed to 26 in 1969. In 1978 the New Castle County School District formed from 11 school districts in that county; however in 1981 it was divided into four school districts. Since 1981 Delaware has 19 school districts. In 2009 there were proposals to change the number of districts to three, one per county, to save costs, although various parents in the state preferred having local school districts so individual communities could have more influence over education.

=== Table ===
| Year | Action | Affected Districts | Ref |
|---|---|---|---|
| 1969 | Merged to form Woodbridge School District | Bridgeville School District; Greenwood School District | |
| 1969 | Merged to form Indian River School District | Dagsboro; Frankford; Georgetown School District; Lord Baltimore School District; Millsboro School District (Note: a small portion was allotted to the Cape Henlopen School District); Selbyville School District | |
| 1969 | Merged into Milford School District | Ellendale School District; Houston School District; Lincoln School District | |
| 1969 | Merged to form Lake Forest School District | Felton School District; Frederica School District; Harrington School District | |
| 1969 | Merged to form Cape Henlopen School District | Lewes School District; Milton School District; Rehoboth Beach School District | |
| 1969 | Merged into Caesar Rodney School District | Magnolia School District; Oak Point School District | |
| 1978 | Merged to form New Castle County School District | Alfred I. du Pont School District; Claymont School District; Conrad School District; De La Warr School District; Marshallton-Thomas McKean School District; Mount Pleasant School District; Gunning Bedford School District; Newark School District; Stanton School District; Wilmington School District | |
| 1980s | Absorbed into the Caesar Rodney School District | Dover Air Force Base (Note: the Caesar Rodney School District had always administered the school district through government contract) | |
| 1981 | Divided into desegregated Brandywine, Christina, Colonial & Red Clay districts | New Castle County School District | |

== See also ==
- List of charter schools in Delaware
