= Seaford Senior High School =

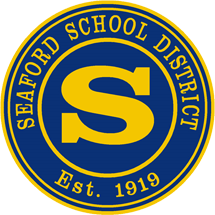

Location
- 399 North Market Street; Seaford, Delaware 19973; United States; 38°39′06″N 75°36′49″W

Information
- Type: Secondary Public
- Motto: "Pride Through Excellence"
- Established: 1966 (60 years ago)
- Superintendent: Dr. Sharon DiGirolamo
- CEEB code: 080140
- Principal: Dr. Susan Harrison
- Faculty: 88
- Grades: 9th - 12th
- Enrollment: 833 (2023-2024)
- Colors: Blue and gold
- Athletics conference: Henlopen Conference - Southern Division
- Mascot: Blue Jay
- Website: shs.seafordbluejays.org

Seaford Senior High School is an American public high school in Seaford, Delaware. The school's attendance area includes the towns of Seaford, Blades, and a small portion of Bridgeville.

== History ==
Seaford Senior High School was established in 1966. The building was designed by Wilmington architects Martin & Wason.

== Academics ==
Students can choose from an array of academic courses from college-prep to Advanced Placement to prepare them for the college/university of their choosing. Teachers on the secondary level use the curriculum mapping process to align their content with the Delaware Content Standards, articulate instruction from grades 6–12, and coordinate assignments at each grade level.

For the graduating class of 2010, students taking the SAT scored an average of 474 in math and 460 in verbal for a combined score of 934. This is compared with averages of 482+479=961 throughout the state and 516+501=1017 nationally.

== Athletics ==
All Seaford School District teams compete in the Henlopen Conference in middle school and high school sports. Seaford High School is one of the smallest schools in the conference, based on enrollment, and thereby competes in the Henlopen South.

Following outrage over the playing of Roseanne Barr's 1990 performance of The Star-Spangled Banner during the school's September 24, 2019 girls' volleyball match against Milford High School, the district apologized about this issue.

== Awards ==
The school won the AARP Ethel Percy Andrus Legacy Award, that recognises outstanding educational achievements, in 2008 for its Advanced Placement Incentive Program.

The Corporation for National and Community Service recognised the school, in 2001 for its outstanding service-learning programs that integrates service into the curriculum.

== Notable alumni ==
- Delino DeShields (class of 1987), former MLB player and current coach
- Stephanie Hansen, Delaware state senator for the 10th district
- Lovett Purnell, former NFL tight end
- Mark Scharf, playwright
- Yuri Schwebler (class of 1962), conceptual artist and sculptor.
