= Indian River High School (Delaware) =

Coordinates: 38°32′32″N 75°13′48″W

Information
- School type: High school
- School district: Indian River School District

Indian River High School is a part of the Indian River School District, located in Dagsboro, Delaware, in southern Sussex County.

Indian River High School is one of two high schools in the district, along with Sussex Central High School in Georgetown Delaware.

== Desegregation ==
Indian River High School remained an all-white school called John M. Clayton until 1967, long after Brown v. Board of Education.

Indian River High School students and staff moved into their new building in 2005, while the original Indian River HS building later became John M. Clayton Elementary School, a K-5 school.

== Notable alumni ==
- Sandra Bruce, acting Inspector General of the U.S. Department of Education.
- Colleen Davis, state treasurer, class of 1998.
- Bethany Hall-Long, Lt. Governor

== Athletics ==
The Indian River High School Indians compete in athletics in the Henlopen Conference. They are one of the smallest schools in the conference, based on enrollment, and thereby compete in the Henlopen South. The Indians have won eight state championships, with the latest coming in boys' soccer in 2020. The Indians have won two state football championships in 1988 and 2011, two state championships in basketball in 1980 and 1981, and a championship in softball in 1998.

=== Football ===
The history of the Indian River Indians football team goes as far back as 1963 with their first win in the Henlopen Conference when the school was known as John M Clayton. In 1980, the state split the schools for football into two divisions. Indian River was placed in the Henlopen South Division in the conference and have won 16 division championships. Indian River's last southern division title came in 1980

=== Football state championships ===
In 1988, the Indian River football team started hot, winning 9 of their 10 regular season games. They were 6–0 in the southern division and their only loss came at Seaford who was a division one team at the time. The team was led by quarterback Heath Hall and running back Kevin Mumford Joyner who rushed 275 yards and 3 touchdowns . The Indians traveled to Claymont High School for their semi-final game and defeated them 34 to 19, Mumford rushed 300 yards 4 touchdowns and was MVP of the game . The next game was for the state championship against Dickinson High School at Dover High School who came in undefeated at 11–0. The Indians won their first championship by a score of 18–13. They finished the season at 11–1.

The 2011 high school football season was a season that no one saw coming. The team was coming off two back to back 5-5 regular season records. The Indians ran through the 2011 regular season schedule with an undefeated record. They won every game by at least 14 points and showcased a hurry up offence that had not been seen in the state of Delaware before. Their semi-final game was against Howard High School at IR. They won the game 49–14. Next came Caravel High School at Delaware State University field in Dover. Indian River claimed the Division 2 state championship, beating Caravel 35–13. Quarterback Jamie Jarmon had three rushing touchdowns and also intercepted two Jonathan Welch passes. The Indians capped off a perfect season at 12–0, winning their first state title since 1988 and the second in school history.

== MCJROTC ==
The Marine Corps Junior Reserve Officer Training Corps is one of many extracurricular activities. The Drill Team and the Rifle Team have won many awards for parades and competitions.
