= Indian River School District (Delaware) =

School district in Delaware, United States

Location
- 31 Hosier Street, Selbyville DE 19975 Southeastern Sussex County, Delaware United States

District information
- Type: Public
- Motto: "A Model of Excellence"
- Grades: K−12
- Superintendent: Jay F. Owens

Students and staff
- Students: 10,171
- Teachers: 717
- Staff: 717
- Athletic conference: Henlopen Conference

Other information
- Website: Official Site

The Indian River School District (IRSD) is a public school district in Sussex County, Delaware in the United States. The district is based in Selbyville and serves the southeastern portion of Sussex County.

== History ==
It was established in 1969 due to school districts merging.

The districts that consolidated include Georgetown Special School District, the former Indian River School District, Millsboro School District 23, and the Selbyville School District 32. The previous Indian River district was established on January 18, 1968 from the consolidation of the John M. Clayton School District 97 and the Lord Baltimore School District 28.

The school district is one of the largest by land area in the State of Delaware.

== Geography ==
The Indian River School District serves the southeastern portion of Sussex County, Delaware. Communities served by the district include: Selbyville, Bethany Beach, Dagsboro, Fenwick Island, Frankford, Georgetown, Long Neck, Millsboro, Millville, Ocean View, and South Bethany.

== School board ==
- James Hudson, President
- Rodney Layfield, Vice President
- Charles Bireley
- James Fritz
- Leolga Wright
- W. Scott Collins
- Donald Hattier
- Susan Bunting, Executive Secretary
- Jerry Peden
- Douglas Hudson
- Heather Statler, Dr.

== Schools ==
High schools

- Indian River High School
- Sussex Central High School

Middle schools

- Georgetown Middle School
- Sussex Central Middle School
- Selbyville Middle School

Elementary schools

- Clayton (John M.) Elementary School
- East Millsboro Elementary School
- Georgetown Elementary School
- Long Neck Elementary School
- Lord Baltimore Elementary School
- North Georgetown Elementary School
- Showell (Phillip C.) Elementary School

Other schools

- Early Learning Center
- Ennis (Howard T.) School (special education up to 21 years old)
- Southern Delaware School of the Arts

== See also ==
- List of school districts in Delaware
