= Zack Gelof =

American baseball player (born 1999)

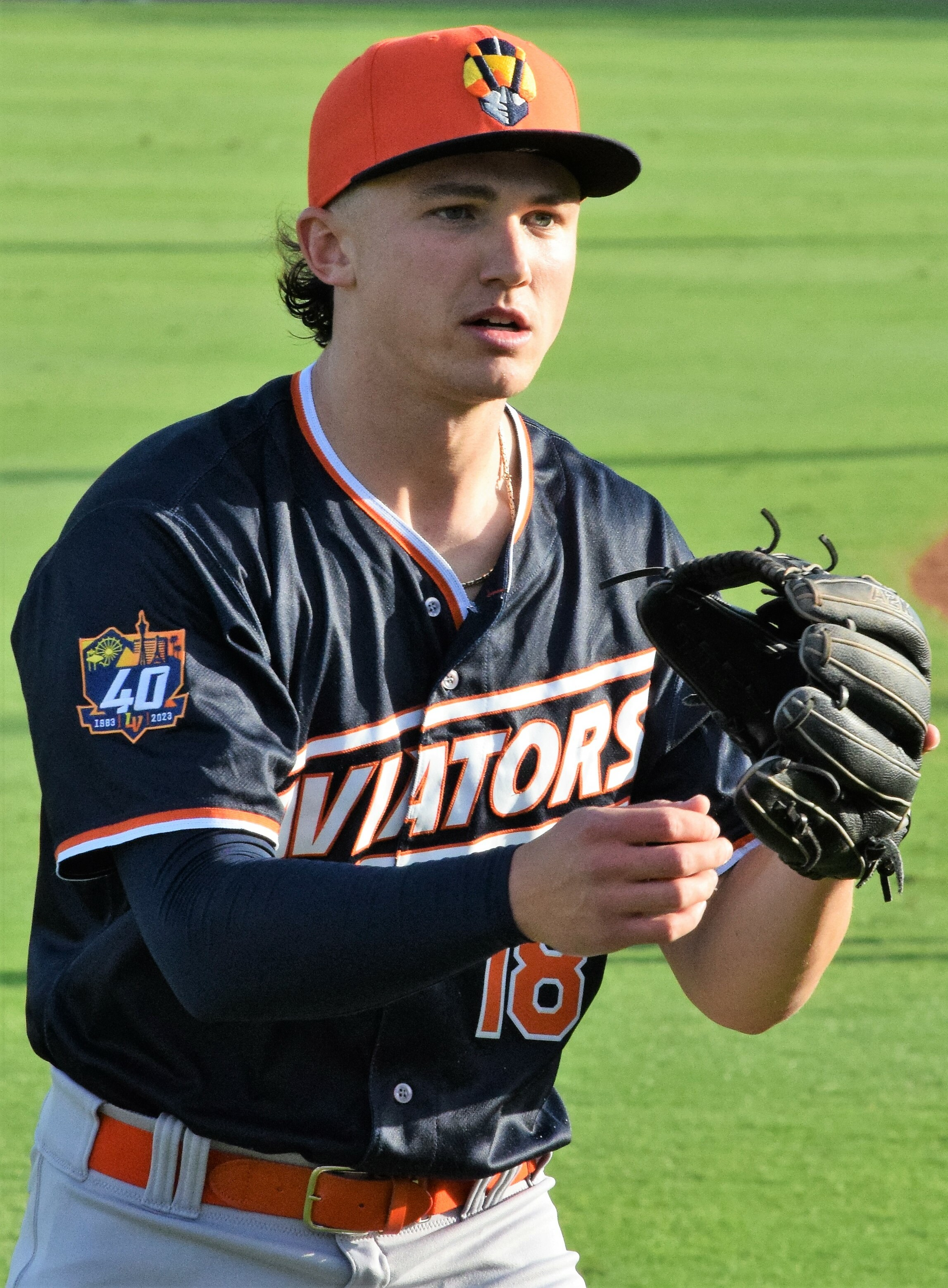
- Gelof with the Las Vegas Aviators in 2023

Athletics – No. 20
- Second baseman and third baseman
- Born: October 19, 1999 (age 27); Rehoboth Beach, Delaware, U.S.
- Bats: Right Throws: Right

MLB debut
- July 14, 2023, for the Oakland Athletics

MLB statistics (through September 19, 2026)
- Batting average: .232
- Home runs: 52
- Runs batted in: 138
- Stats at Baseball Reference

Teams
- Oakland Athletics / Athletics (2023–present)

Zachary Dunn Gelof (born October 19, 1999) is an American professional baseball second baseman and third baseman for the Athletics of Major League Baseball (MLB). He played college baseball for the Virginia Cavaliers. He was selected by the Athletics in the second round of the 2021 MLB draft, and made his MLB debut for them in 2023. Gelof played for Team Israel in the 2023 World Baseball Classic.

== Personal life ==
Gelof is a son of Kelly and Adam Gelof, both of whom are attorneys; they married in 1996, after graduating from law school. His paternal grandfather received a Purple Heart as a tank commander for fighting in Europe during World War II, and his paternal grandmother was the president of Congregation Beth Sholom in Dover, Delaware. He is Jewish, and when he made his Major League debut he became the 17th Jewish player to play in the majors in 2023. His younger brother Jake Gelof played baseball as a third baseman for the University of Virginia, was drafted in the second round of the 2023 draft by the Los Angeles Dodgers, and now plays in the Dodgers organization; Jake was Zack's teammate in both high school and college.

== Amateur career ==
=== High school ===
Gelof grew up in Rehoboth Beach, Delaware, where he attended Hebrew school in the Seaside Jewish Community. He attended Cape Henlopen High School. Gelof served as Class President for each of his four years.

He played every game of the high school baseball team's four seasons in his years in high school. In his senior year, playing shortstop and pitching, he batted .465 and led the state in hits (35), runs (37), and home runs (7) and was 28-for-28 in stolen bases, along with 17 RBIs. As a pitcher he was 4-0 with a 1.30 ERA, and 34 strikeouts in 26 innings, and threw an 87 miles per hour fastball. He was named 2018 Delaware Gatorade Player of Year, Delaware Baseball Coaches Player of the Year, Delaware News Journal First Team All-State Shortstop, Perfect Game/Rawlings 2018 honorable mention All American and 1st Team Northeast All Region. He finished his high school baseball career as Delaware's all-time leader in runs scored (103) and stolen bases (81-for-81), and second in career hits (105), and was a two-time Henlopen Conference Player of Year as a shortstop and a pitcher.

He also played soccer for the high school, and finished his career as the leading goal scorer in the State of Delaware for his four-year career span 2015-18 (61 goals; 16 assists). He was four-time All-Conference, three-time All-State, and as a senior was named Conference Player of the Year. He graduated with a 4.02 GPA.

He was selected in the 38th round of the 2018 Major League Baseball draft by the Cleveland Indians, but Gelof opted not to sign with the team. During the summer after his senior year Gelof played summer collegiate baseball for the Brockton Rox of the Futures Collegiate Baseball League, and played third base. He batted .292/.370/.403 with 9 doubles (10th in the league), 4 triples (3rd), and 13 stolen bases (9th) in 15 attempts.

=== College ===
Gelof played college baseball while he was an economics major at Virginia in the Atlantic Coast Conference (ACC) for three seasons, starting every game the team played, and batting .316/.396/.478 in 137 games. As a freshman in 2019, he started all 56 games at third base and batted .313/.377/.396 with 16 stolen bases (10th in the ACC) in 19 attempts, and six sacrifice flies (3rd). He then played for the 2019 Kalamazoo Growlers in the collegiate summer Northwoods League, and batted .349/.426/.490 with three triples (6th in the league) and 22 steals (9th) in 24 attempts, while playing 26 games at third base and two games at shortstop.

As a sophomore in 2020, Gelof batted .349/.469/.746 (leading the ACC) with 24 runs scored (leading the ACC; 4th in the NCAA), six doubles (7th), two triples (4th), five home runs (6th), 18 RBIs (8th), and 13 walks (10th) in 18 games at third base before the season was cut short due to the coronavirus pandemic. He was named a Collegiate Baseball Second Team All-American, and the third-best third baseman in D1Baseball’s 2020 Top-30 Power Rankings. He played for the High Point-Thomasville HiToms of the collegiate summer Coastal Plain League after the season, batting .364/.442/.636.

Gelof was named both Collegiate Baseball and NCBWA 2021 First Team Preseason All-American, and both Baseball America and Perfect Game Second Team Preseason All-American, as well as the D1Baseball No. 5 preseason third baseman. As a junior in 2021 Gelof batted .312/.393/.485 and led the ACC in hits (81), as he also had 50 runs (7th), 18 doubles (4th), 126 total bases (6th), and 12 stolen bases in 13 attempts. He was named second team All–ACC. Virginia played in the 2021 College World Series, and he was named the third baseman on the All-Tournament Team after hitting .583.

== Professional career ==
=== 2021 ===
Gelof was selected in the second round of the 2021 Major League Baseball draft by the Oakland Athletics. As the 60th pick overall, he was the sixth-highest draft pick in Delaware history. He signed with the team on July 24, 2021, and received a $1,157,400 signing bonus.

In 2021 Gelof was assigned to the Rookie-level Arizona Complex League Athletics to start his professional career, where he played in one game. He was then promoted to the Low-A Stockton Ports, for whom he batted .298/.393/.548. He finished the season with the Las Vegas Aviators of the Triple-A West, where while nearly six years younger than the average player in the league and only two months after playing college baseball, he batted 7-for-12 with 6 RBIs. With the three teams combined, in 2021 he batted .333/.422/.565 in 138 at bats with seven home runs and 13 stolen bases in 15 attempts, and batted .447 with runners in scoring position, while playing third base. MLB.com ranked him as the A's 7th-best prospect, and the 87th-best prospect in baseball, and both Fangraphs and Baseball America ranked him as the club's 2nd-best prospect.Batted .447 with runners in scoring position

=== 2022 ===
In 2022, Gelof ran the fastest 30-yard sprint in the A’s farm system in the spring. He missed almost seven weeks with a torn labrum and subluxed left (non-throwing) shoulder suffered in May when he dove for a ground ball, but playing for the Midland RockHounds of the Double–A Texas League he hit .271/.356/.438 with 13 home runs and nine stolen bases in 11 attempts in 354 at bats over 83 games. He played 53 games at second base, 26 games at third base, seven games at DH, and one game in center field. MLB.com ranked him the #97 prospect in baseball, and the A's #4 prospect. He then played nine games at second base for the Triple–A Las Vegas Aviators of the Pacific Coast League. He slashed .257/.316/.714 with five home runs in 35 at bats. MiLB.com and Baseball America ranked him the A’s third-best prospec, and MiLB named him an A’s Organizational All-Star.

A’s assistant general manager Billy Owens said: "Zack Gelof is a dynamic athlete. He’s a plus, plus runner. He’s got serious strength. I see the plate discipline improving as he climbs the ladder. At some point, I see him also going to the outfield and using that dynamic athleticism all around the diamond." He played for the Mesa Solar Sox in the 2022 Arizona Fall League.

=== 2023 ===
In 2023, Gelof played in spring training for the A's, batting .320/.414/.400. He started the season as the A's #3 prospect, playing for Triple–A Las Vegas. MLB.com reported on July 13, 2023, that it had been informed by a source that the 23-year-old Gelof was being called up to the A's. At the time, Gelof with Las Vegas was batting .304/.401/.529 in 263 at bats with 60 runs (6th in the Pacific Coast League), 21 doubles (3rd), 12 home runs, 44 RBIs, 20 stolen bases (5th) while being caught five times, and had played exclusively second base.

The next day, Gelof was formally selected to the 40-man roster and promoted to the major leagues for the first time, and he made his MLB debut for the A's on July 14. He was the fourth position player in his draft class to reach the major leagues. Gelof hit his first major league home run on July 22, 2023, against Ryne Stanek of the Houston Astros. On August 9, he became the fastest player in Oakland A's history to hit six home runs, doing so in his first 22 games. On August 13, he became the fourth Oakland rookie to have four hits and two home runs in one game since the team moved to Oakland in 1968. He became the first player in the Modern Era (since 1900) to hit at least eight home runs and steal at least six bases in his first 25 career games. On August 16, he became the first player in A’s history to have 20 extra-base hits and 20 runs scored through his first 28 games. On August 24, he hit his 10th home run, doing so in his 35th major league game--making him the fastest A's player to reach 10 home runs in franchise history. He had 33 extra-base hits in his first 60 games, the most by any A’s player in franchise history. He was named the American League Rookie of the Month for August.

In 2023 with the A's, Gelof batted .267/.337/.504 in 270 at bats, with 40 runs, 20 doubles, 14 home runs, 32 RBIs, and 14 stolen bases in 16 attempts. His 87.5% successful stolen base percentage was 7th-best in the AL.He played 69 games, all starts at second base. Among MLB rookies with 300 or more plate appearances, he had the third-highest isolated power (.237) and line drive percentage (25.5%), the fifth-highest slugging percentage, and the sixth-highest OPS (.840) and WAR (2.9). He was one of five rookies in A's history to have at least 10 home runs and 10 stolen bases in a season, his .504 slugging percentage was sixth best in Oakland history among rookies with 250 or more plate appearances, and his 35 extra base hits were the most in team history by a player over the first 69 games of his career. He was named an A’s Organization All-Star by MLB.com following the season. Gelof earned $388,000 from the MLB pre-arbitration bonus pool allocated for players with between 0-3 years of service time, who played on league-minimum contracts, and who were paid significantly less than their 2023 on-field production would warrant.

=== 2024 ===
In January 2024, MLB.com ranked Gelof the 9th-best second baseman in the major leagues.

In 2024 with the A's, Gelof batted .211/.270/.362 in 497 at-bats, with 60 runs, 20 doubles, 17 home runs, 49 RBIs, three sacrifice hits (9th in the AL), and 25 stolen bases (8th) in 28 attempts (his 89.29% stolen base percentage was 9th-best in the league), with a 20.2 power-speed number (9th), and led the AL with 188 strikeouts and in strikeout percentage (34.4%). He became the third player in Athletics history to have at least 10 home runs and 10 stolen bases in each of his first two major league seasons. He played 138 games, all at second base, and led all AL second basemen in putouts (264), range factor/game (4.32), and range factor/9 innings (4.43), as he was second in double plays turned (92) and third in assists (332) and fielding percentage (.988). Gelof earned $740,000 in salary.

=== 2025 ===
Gelof missed the beginning of the season as the result of a right hamate bone fracture that required surgery. He was activated from the injured list for his season debut on July 4. On September 20, Gelof was placed on the injured list due to a dislocated left shoulder, which required season-ending surgery. In 30 games for the Athletics, Gelof batted .174/.230/.272 in 92 at bats with two home runs, seven RBIs, and one stolen base, while exclusively playing second base.

Playing for Triple–A Las Vegas in the Pacific Coast League, he batted .256/.371/.517 in 176 at bats with 12 home runs, 31 RBIs, and 12 stolen bases without being caught, while playing second base.

=== 2026 ===
Gelof was optioned to Triple-A Las Vegas to begin the 2026 season. In 11 games with the team, he batted .356/.519/.732 in 41 at bats with 4 home runs and 10 RBIs, stealing three bases without being caught, while on defense he played second base and all three outfield positions. On April 10, he was called up to the A's, where he began the season splitting time betweens second base, third base, center field, and right field .

Gelof sported a 24-game hitting streak early in the 2026 season, along with a 13-game runs-scored streak (the 4th-longest in franchise history, and longest in 93 years), but they were both ended abruptly on June 23, 2026. He had to leave a game against the San Francisco Giants in the second inning, after Matt Chapman inadvertently stepped on Gelof's right (throwing) hand as Gelof was tagging him out with his gloved hand at second base, leaving Gelof's right hand with three bloodied spike punctures. With what ESPN described as his "gruesome" injury, Gelof was removed from the game, after having had only one hit-less at bat. Gelof's hitting streak was the longest active streak in the majors, matched the longest single-season streak in the major leagues over the prior two seasons, and was the sixth-longest in A’s franchise history (the second-longest since the team moved to California in 1968, after a 25-game hitting streak of Jason Giambi). It also ended his 27-game on base streak, and his 13-game run scoring streak. He was placed on the 10-day injured list with a right hand contusion.

== International career ==
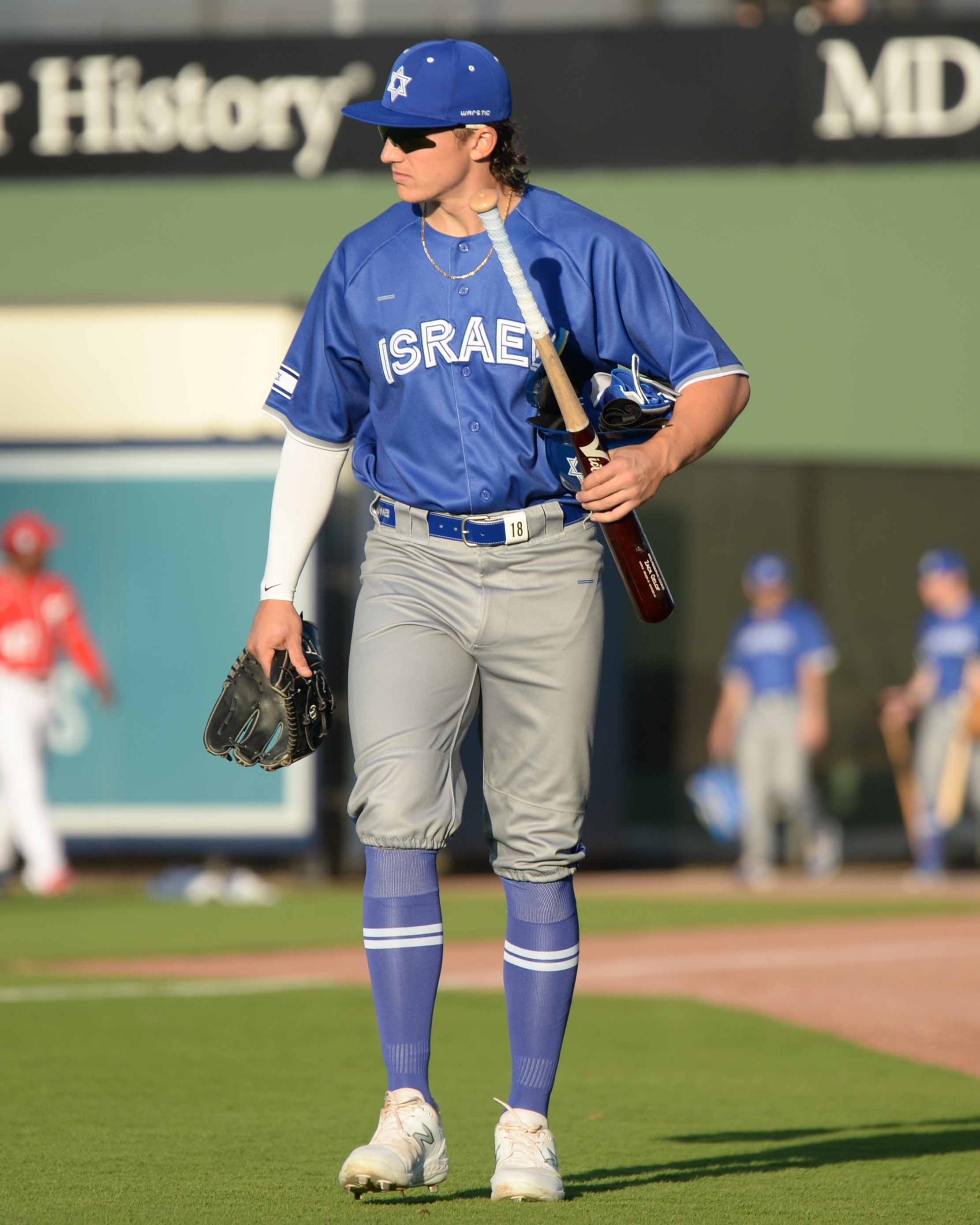
Gelof with Team Israel

Gelof played second base for Team Israel in the 2023 World Baseball Classic. In the competition, Team Israel went 1-3 and was eliminated in group play.

Due to an injury, he did not play for Team Israel in the 2026 World Baseball Classic. He thereby missed out on an opportunity to play on the team alongside his younger brother Jake.

== Gelof Brothers Foundation ==
In November 2023, Gelof and his brother created the Gelof Brothers Foundation. Its mission is to provide resources and assistance to support the development of youth. That month they hosted an inaugural youth sports camp for children ages 8-13 at Cape Henlopen High School in Lewes, Delaware.

== See also ==
- List of Jewish Major League Baseball players
