= Bill Collick =

American football and wrestling coach

Biographical details
- Born: c. 1951

Playing career

Football
- 1970–1971: Wesley (DE)

Coaching career (HC unless noted)

Football
- ?–1980: Cape Henlopen HS (DE) (assistant)
- 1981–1984: Delaware State (DC)
- 1985–1996: Delaware State
- 2000–2009: Sussex Technical HS (DE)
- 2010–2017: Cape Henlopen HS (DE)

Wrestling
- ?–1981: Cape Henlopen HS (DE)
- 1981–?: Delaware State

Administrative career (AD unless noted)
- 1996–2000: Delaware State

Head coaching record
- Overall: 81–48 (college football)

Accomplishments and honors

Championships
- 5 MEAC (1985, 1987, 1987–1989, 1991)

Awards
- MEAC Coach of the Year (1985)

William Collick (born c. 1951) is an American former football and wrestling coach and college athletics administrator. He served as the head football coach at Delaware State University from 1985 to 1996, compiling a record of 81–48. Collick was also the athletic director at Delaware State from 1996 to 2000. After leaving Delaware State, Collick coached high school football, as head football coach at Sussex Technical High School in Georgetown, Delaware from 2000 to 2009 and Cape Henlopen High School in Lewes, Delaware from 2010 until his retirement following the 2017 season.

In 1998 Collick was inducted into the Delaware Sports Hall of Fame.

== Head coaching record ==
=== College football ===
| Year | Team | Overall | Conference | Standing | Bowl/playoffs | NCAA^{#} |
|---|---|---|---|---|---|---|
Delaware State Hornets (Mid-Eastern Athletic Conference) (1985–1996)
| 1985 | Delaware State | 9–2 | 4–0 | 1st | | T–12 |
| 1986 | Delaware State | 7–4 | 3–2 | T–2nd | | |
| 1987 | Delaware State | 9–1 | 5–0 | 1st | | 20 |
| 1988 | Delaware State | 5–5 | 4–2 | T–1st | | |
| 1989 | Delaware State | 7–4 | 5–1 | 1st | | |
| 1990 | Delaware State | 7–3 | 4–2 | 3rd | | |
| 1991 | Delaware State | 9–2 | 5–1 | T–1st | | |
| 1992 | Delaware State | 6–5 | 3–3 | T–4th | | |
| 1993 | Delaware State | 6–5 | 4–2 | T–2nd | | |
| 1994 | Delaware State | 7–4 | 4–2 | 2nd | | |
| 1995 | Delaware State | 6–5 | 5–1 | 2nd | | |
| 1996 | Delaware State | 3–8 | 2–5 | T–6th | | |
| Delaware State: | | 81–48 | 48–21 | | | |
| Total: | | 81–48 | | | | |
National championship Conference title Conference division title or championship game berth
