= Collick =

Collick is a surname. Notable people with the surname include:

- Bill Collick (born c. 1951), American football and wrestling coach and college athletics administrator
- Percy Collick (1897–1984), British politician and trade union official
