= Cape Henlopen High School =

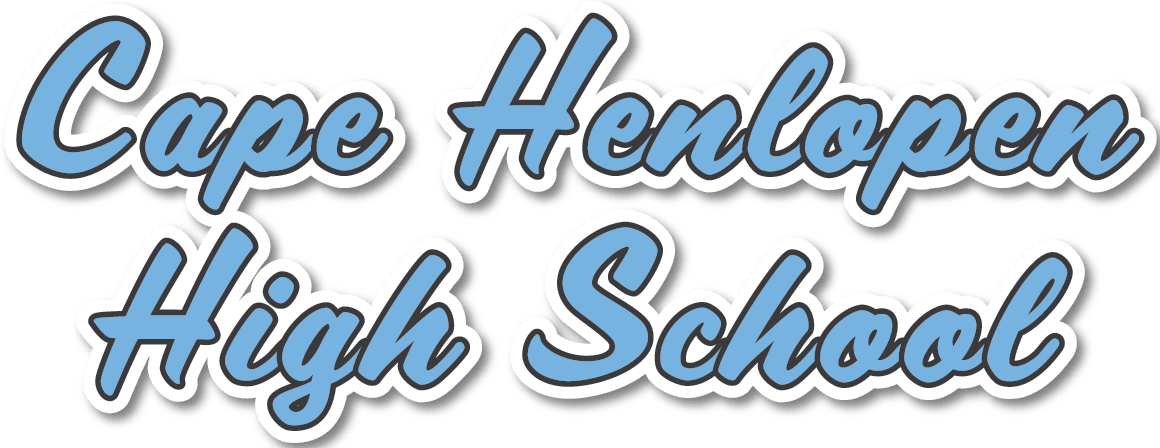

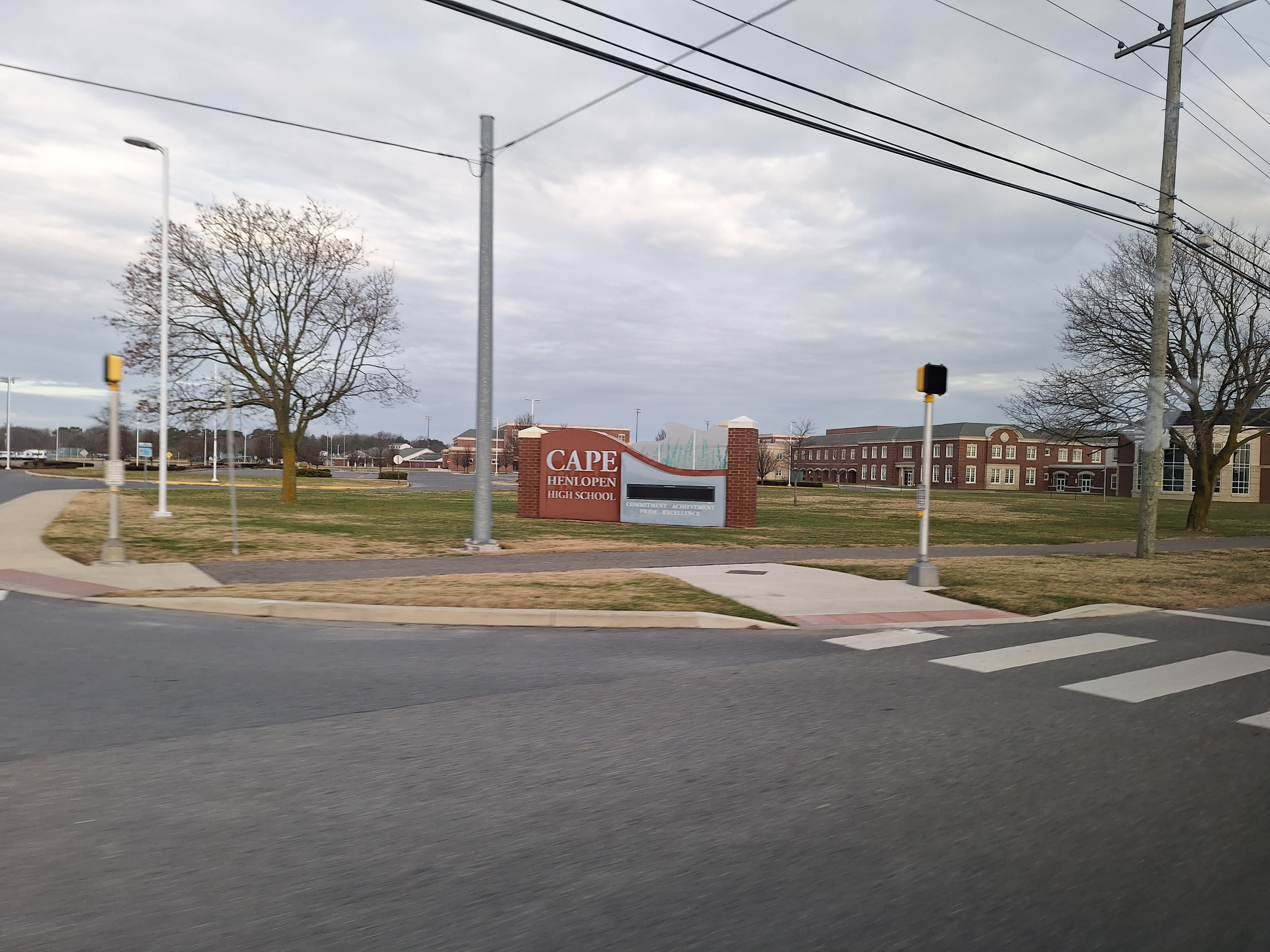

Location
- 1250 Kings Highway; Lewes, Delaware 19958; United States; 38°45′24″N 75°08′59″W

Information
- Type: Public
- Established: 1969 (57 years ago)
- Status: Open
- School district: Cape Henlopen School District
- Oversight: Delaware Department of Education
- CEEB code: 080080
- Principal: Kristin DeGregory
- Grades: 9–12
- Enrollment: 1,918 (2023-2024)
- Colors: Columbia blue and gold
- Athletics: Henlopen Conference - Northern Division
- Mascot: Vikings
- Nickname: Cape/CHHS/C-High
- Rival: Sussex Technical High School; Caesar Rodney High School
- Newspaper: Viking Ventures
- Yearbook: Valhalla
- Website: www.capehenlopenschools.com/chhs

Cape Henlopen High School (CHHS) is a public high school in unincorporated Sussex County, Delaware, United States, with a Lewes postal address. The school is part of the Cape Henlopen School District and is located between Savannah Road and King's Highway. Cape Henlopen's school colors are bright gold and Columbia blue. Its mascot is Thor the Viking. The school is known for its expansive career pathways.

In the 2020-21 school year, there were 1,637 students enrolled at the high school.

== History ==
The original Cape Henlopen High School opened in 1969. It was a combination of three area schools that housed their high school grade levels with other grades: Rehoboth School, Lewes School, and Milton School. Initially school was held at the former Lewes High School.

The district began construction of a new building to house Cape Henlopen High School in 1974. In September 1976, the new Cape Henlopen High School opened on Kings Hwy. The school was a model of 1970s architecture and echoed the educational sentiment of the day that called for minimal distraction in a classroom. The school's very few windows were positioned in places where it would be difficult for students to gaze out of them during classroom time. It was possible for a student to enter the building at the beginning of the school day and not see the sunshine again until he or she left at the end of the school day. Over time the sentiments of educators changed, and, because the school was showing its age, when construction began on the new school (located on the same property of the current school) in 2007, the decision was made to make it as bright a place as possible.

Construction of the new school was completed in the fall of 2009. The new Cape Henlopen High School incorporates energy-efficient materials and state-of-the-art technology. It also incorporates a separate 9th-grade academy and vocational wing, eliminating the use of the Ninth Grade Campus building. The main building's design relies heavily on the school colors, with walls being painted to match the colors. The floor tiles are adorned with the blue and gold. The exterior is primary brick. The gymnasium features a wooden floor with blue decorations and “Vikings” written at each end. The large bleachers have “CAPE” painted onto them. The school's expansive library features a high rising ceiling with modern light fixtures and coves cut into the wall for students to sit and read. The cafeteria has a high rising ceiling. multiple TV's display pertinent information to students. On the wall above the cafeteria's exit is multiple clocks showing times from other capes around the world including Cape Town

It was announced during the 2018–19 school year that an addition would be placed on the school. The addition is to have two stories, with a commons to span both stories. The new number of classrooms ranging 20-21 based on how many classrooms the funds can obtain. A skylight was to be installed. The school board approved it in 2018. The plans were announced during the 2018 referendum. The addition is complete and located on the Kings Highway side of the building. It would result in an additional capacity of about 450 students. New features include a UN-style classrooms, 6 dedicated consortium classrooms, access corridors from the ninth grade wing, and an additional courtyard. The addition follows the same exterior architecture as the main campus. The addition also adds an extension to the cafeteria that has been completed. Groundbreaking occurred in 2019. During the 2021-22 school year the wing would open, serving as a “Freshman” wing. Most students refer to it as the “J Wing” because all room numbers start with a J.

The additions architecture follows the main building with an extreme modern twist. The first floor common area features a massive mural composing pictures of local landmarks all tinted blue. All of the new classrooms feature new desk and chairs. The bathrooms have some of the fanciest features. Including sinks, with soap dispensers, a faucet, and a dryer all built into one. The addition provided space for a secondary courtyard with a stage.

== Athletics ==
Cape Henlopen High School participates in athletics in the Henlopen Conference and is one of the larger high schools based on enrollment, thereby competing in the Henlopen North. Their 37 state championships rank them #1 in the Henlopen Conference for total state championships. The Lady Vikings' win of the 2009 Lacrosse title made them the first public high school in the state to win the championship that had been held since 1998. They also have a defending conference championship girls' cross country team that is looking to defend the title. Beside them is the boys' cross country team, coached by George Pepper. In May 2010 Cape's Lady Vikings Lacrosse team was titled State Champions for the second year in a row. As of 2015, Cape's girls' field hockey team has won five consecutive state championships, making them the first high school in the state to do so.

On May 23, 2013, Cape's girls' lacrosse team won its fifth straight state championship, defeating Tower Hill 12–10 at Dover High School. Cape became the first public school to win a girls' lacrosse title and is one of only three schools in the state to ever win the championship. The win extended Cape's winning streak against Delaware opponents to 63 games.

== Extracurricular activities ==
Cape Henlopen High School has an Army JROTC program. Cape Henlopen competes in competitions all over the area with its Raider, Rifle, and Drill teams and its Color Guard.

The school bands take an active part in the community. The concert and marching band have over 100 members every year, and they perform in numerous local parades, as well as in competitions in places like London, Boston, Toronto, Miami, and Cleveland. The jazz band also participates in many local events, performing for Veterans Day and Memorial Day services, for local retirement homes, country clubs, and the Rehoboth Beach Bandstand.

The school also participates in the Delaware State ProStart Invitational, a culinary competition held yearly in the Chase Center.

== Notable alumni ==
- Jimmie Allen, country singer
- Mason Fluharty (born 2001), baseball pitcher for the Toronto Blue Jays
- Jake Gelof (born 2002), baseball third baseman
- Zack Gelof (born 1999), baseball second baseman for the Oakland A's
- Kathy McGuiness, former state auditor of Delaware
- Chris Short, Major League Baseball pitcher, 2x All Star with the Philadelphia Phillies, attended Lewes High School for three years.
- Bryan Stevenson, lawyer, activist, author, law professor; founder and executive director of Equal Justice Initiative

== Notable faculty ==
- Dave Frederick, sportswriter and coach, taught at the school for several years
