= Delmar High School =

Location
- 200 N. Eighth St; Delmar, Sussex County, Delaware 19940; United States; 38°27′31″N 75°34′01″W

Information
- Type: Public
- Established: 1928 (98 years ago)
- School district: Delmar School District
- Superintendent: Charity H. Phillips
- CEEB code: 080025
- Principal: Michael Bleile
- Teaching staff: 36.00 (FTE)
- Grades: 9–12
- Enrollment: 714 (2023-2024)
- Student to teacher ratio: 19.83
- Campus type: Rural
- Colors: Orange and blue
- Athletics conference: Henlopen Conference - Southern Division
- Mascot: Wildcats
- Rival: Laurel High School
- Yearbook: Jostens
- Website: delmar.k12.de.us

Delmar High School is a public high school in Delmar, a community in Sussex County, Delaware. It is a part of the Delmar School District.

The school takes students from Delmar, Maryland as well.

== Notable alumni ==
- Alex Ellis, football player
- Stephanie Stahl Hamilton Arizona State Legislature
