= Dave Frederick =

American sportswriter

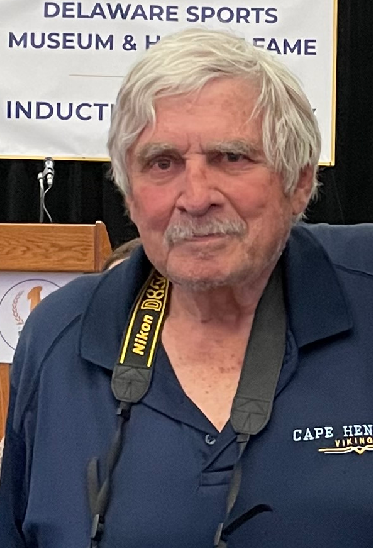
- Frederick in 2026

Biographical details
- Education: Temple University

Playing career
- 1965: Temple
- Position: Right guard

Coaching career (HC unless noted)

Track and field
- 1971–1974: Mitchell Prep
- 1975–1985: Cape Henlopen HS

Football
- 1971–1974: Mitchell Prep
- 1975–1976, 1985–1988: Cape Henlopen HS (asst.)

Cross country
- 1977–1978: Cape Henlopen HS

Accomplishments and honors

Championships
- Outdoor track and field: 2× State Division II (1976, 1978); Indoor track and field: 2× State Division II (1984, 1985); Cross country: State Division II (1977)

Awards
- 2× Delaware Indoor Track Coach of the Year (1984, 1985); Pennsylvania Sports Hall of Fame (2014); Delaware Track and Field Hall of Fame (2016); Delaware Sports Museum and Hall of Fame (2022); Football: PCL Most Outstanding Player (1963); Basketball: PCL Most Outstanding Player (1963)

Dave "Fredman" Frederick is an American sportswriter and former coach.

== Early life and education ==
Frederick attended Bishop Egan Catholic High School near Levittown, Pennsylvania. At Bishop Egan, Frederick played tackle in football for three years on the varsity and was a varsity basketball player for three seasons. He earned numerous honors in both sports, including PCL Most Outstanding Player, All-Catholic, All-Lower Bucks County, All-Scholastic, Blue Cross All-Star and Blue Shield All-Star in football and All-Lower Bucks County, All-PCL and PCL Most Outstanding Player in basketball. His winning of the PCL Most Outstanding Player in both football and basketball was described as a feat "as rare as an iceberg in the Congo."

In 1964, after graduating from Bishop Egan, Frederick announced he was attending Temple University to play basketball. He ended up playing a single season of varsity football at starting right guard before a knee injury ended his playing career.

== Coaching career ==
Frederick became a track coach and football coach at Mitchell Preparatory School, in Upper Darby Township, Pennsylvania, in 1971, where he served through 1974.

In 1975, Frederick moved to Delaware to become head track coach and assistant football coach at Cape Henlopen High School in Sussex County. He served ten years in track, leading the team to outdoor Division II state championships in 1976 and 1978 and indoor state championships in 1984 and 1985. He compiled an overall record of 85–13 at Cape Henlopen, including 23 consecutive wins from 1977 to 1979. He was named Delaware Indoor Track Coach of the Year in 1984 and 1985.

Frederick also served as cross country coach from 1977 to 1978, winning the state championship in 1977. In football, Frederick served as in assistant from 1975 to 1976 before resigning to focus solely on track.

In 1985, Frederick was convinced by a Cape Henlopen coach to return to the football team as an assistant. He resigned from track at the end of 1985 to focus just on football. He served as an assistant with the team until retiring in 1988.

== Later life ==
In 1982, Frederick became a sportswriter for The Whale, a newspaper based in Lewes, Delaware. He wrote a weekly column, titled "People in Sports," until 1993, when he became the sports editor for the Cape Gazette. He has also been a sports analyst for the WGMD radio station.

Frederick wrote a book, titled In a Class by Myself, which was published in 1992. His wife, Susan, drew illustrations.

After retiring from coaching at Cape Henlopen, Frederick taught several classes at the school.

An article in The News Journal referred to Frederick as the "Sussex County humorist-teacher-writer-radio-host-philosopher dude."

Frederick is often known by his nickname "Fredman." "Nobody ever called me Mr. Frederick. From the first day I came here [to Cape Henlopen], the special-ed kids started calling me Fred, so everybody just called me Fred. It evolved from the black athletes on the track team. The approach was always, 'Hey, Fred, man.' And the name became Fredman," he said.

In 1985, (Note: The Cape Gazette reported the date to be 1982.) Frederick founded the Lewes Polar Bear Club, a winter swimming group. In 1991, it became a fundraiser for the Delaware Special Olympics.

Frederick was inducted into the Pennsylvania Sports Hall of Fame in 2014, the Delaware Track and Field Hall of Fame in 2016, and the Delaware Sports Museum and Hall of Fame in 2022. His brother Tom and nephew Mike are also members of the Pennsylvania Sports Hall of Fame.
