= Alex Ellis (American football) =

American football player (born 1993)

Profile
- Position: Tight end

Personal information
- Born: February 10, 1993 (age 33); Delmar, Delaware, U.S.
- Listed height: 6 ft 4 in (1.93 m)
- Listed weight: 245 lb (111 kg)

Career information
- High school: Delmar
- College: Tennessee
- NFL draft: 2016: undrafted

Career history
- Tennessee Titans (2016)*; Jacksonville Jaguars (2016); New Orleans Saints (2017–2018)*; Kansas City Chiefs (2018); Philadelphia Eagles (2019); New England Patriots (2020)*; Las Vegas Raiders (2021)*; Arizona Cardinals (2021–2022)*; Arlington Renegades (2023); DC Defenders (2023–2024)
- * Offseason or practice squad member only

Career NFL statistics
- Receptions: 3
- Receiving yards: 11
- Stats at Pro Football Reference

Alexander Colby Ellis (born February 10, 1993) is an American football tight end. He was signed by the Tennessee Titans as an undrafted free agent after the 2016 NFL draft. He played college football at Tennessee.

== College career ==
Ellis attended the University of Tennessee, where he played as a tight end for the Tennessee football team. In the 2014 and 2015 seasons, he totaled 14 receptions for 232 yards and one touchdown.

== Professional career ==
Pre-draft measurables
| Height | Weight | Arm length | Hand span | Wingspan | 40-yard dash | 10-yard split | 20-yard split | 20-yard shuttle | Three-cone drill | Vertical jump | Broad jump | Bench press |
|---|---|---|---|---|---|---|---|---|---|---|---|---|
| 6 ft 4 1/2 in (1.94 m) | 253 lb (115 kg) | 32 1/8 in (0.82 m) | 9 1/2 in (0.24 m) | 6 ft 6 1/2 in (1.99 m) | 4.79 s | 1.60 s | 2.69 s | 4.37 s | 6.87 s | 34.5 in (0.88 m) | 10 ft 1 in (3.07 m) | 20 reps |
All values from Pro Day

=== Tennessee Titans ===
On May 9, 2016, Ellis signed with the Tennessee Titans as an undrafted free agent. On September 2, Ellis was waived by the Titans as part of final roster cuts.

=== Jacksonville Jaguars ===
On September 5, 2016, Ellis was signed to the Jacksonville Jaguars' practice squad. On November 26, he was promoted to their active roster, where he played his first NFL game against the Buffalo Bills.

On September 2, 2017, Ellis was waived by the Jaguars.

=== New Orleans Saints ===
On November 29, 2017, Ellis was signed to the New Orleans Saints' practice squad. He signed a reserve/future contract with the Saints on January 16, 2018. On May 7, Ellis was waived by the Saints.

=== Kansas City Chiefs ===
On May 8, 2018, Ellis was claimed off waivers by the Kansas City Chiefs. He was waived with an injury designation by the Chiefs on October 2. After going unclaimed on waivers, the Chiefs placed him on injured reserve.

=== Philadelphia Eagles ===
On August 2, 2019, Ellis was signed by the Philadelphia Eagles. He was waived during final roster cuts on August 31, and re-signed to the team's practice squad the next day. On September 6, he was promoted to the 53-man roster as the team's third tight end. He was waived again on September 10, and re-signed to the team's practice squad on September 11. He was promoted to the team's active roster again on September 17. After suffering a knee injury in Week 4 against the Green Bay Packers, Ellis was waived/injured on October 4, and subsequently reverted to the team's injured reserve list after clearing waivers on October 7. He was waived from injured reserve with an injury settlement on October 15. He was re-signed to the practice squad on December 16. He signed a reserve/future contract with the Eagles on January 6, 2020. Ellis was waived by the Eagles on July 17.

=== New England Patriots ===
On August 17, 2020, Ellis was signed by the New England Patriots. On August 22, he was waived.

=== Las Vegas Raiders ===
On June 3, 2021, Ellis signed with the Las Vegas Raiders. He was waived on August 31.

=== Arizona Cardinals ===
On November 9, 2021, Ellis was signed to the practice squad of the Arizona Cardinals. He signed a reserve/future contract with the Cardinals on January 19, 2022. He was released on July 26.

=== Arlington Renegades ===
In November 2022, Ellis was selected by the Arlington Renegades in the eighth round, 58th overall, of Phase 1 of the 2023 XFL draft.

=== DC Defenders ===
On March 6, 2023, Ellis was traded by Arlington in a three-way trade with the Orlando Guardians to the DC Defenders. He finished the season with eight receptions for 59 yards and four touchdowns. Ellis re-signed with the team on March 11, 2024.
