= Henlopen Conference =

Sports conference in Delaware, United States

Coordinates: 38.9722°N 75.5420°W

The Henlopen Conference is a high school sports conference comprising public schools in Kent County and Sussex County in lower Delaware. The teams participate in a variety of sports including football, boys and girls soccer, track and field, cross country, boys and girls basketball, boys and girls indoor track, boys and girls outdoor track, wrestling, boys and girls lacrosse, baseball, softball, cheerleading, boys and girls swimming, and field hockey.

== Schools and teams ==
The schools and teams that make up the Henlopen Conference are divided into two divisions, the Henlopen Northern Division and Henlopen Southern Division. Despite the name, the schools are not divided by geographical location, but rather by enrollment numbers, with the larger schools in the Northern Division and the smaller schools in the Southern Division. The conferences are re-arranged every few years based on enrollment numbers.

The current conference alignment for the schools along with the city they are located in are:

Henlopen Northern Division

School	Team	City	Geographic areas served
Caesar Rodney	Riders	Camden	Camden, Wyoming, Dover Air Force Base, Magnolia, Woodside
Cape Henlopen	Vikings	Lewes	Lewes, Rehoboth Beach, Milton, Harbeson, Cedar Creek, Broadkill Beach
Dover	Senators	Dover	Dover, Cheswold, Hartly, Little Creek, Leipsic
Polytech	Panthers	Woodside	Kent County technical students
Smyrna	Eagles	Smyrna	Smyrna, Clayton, Kenton
Sussex Central	Golden Knights	Georgetown	Georgetown, Millsboro
Sussex Tech	Ravens	Georgetown	Sussex County technical students
Milford	Buccaneers	Milford	Milford, Ellendale, Houston, Lincoln, Thompsonville, Slaughter Beach

Henlopen Southern Division

School	Team	City	Geographic areas
Delmar	Wildcats	Delmar	Delmar
Early College School at Delaware State University	Hornets	Dover	Statewide - Charter school
Indian River	Indians	Dagsboro	Dagsboro, Frankford, Bethany Beach, Millville, Ocean View, Gumboro, Angola, Oak Orchard, Selbyville, Fenwick Island
Lake Forest	Spartans	Felton	Felton, Bowers Beach, Frederica, Harrington, Viola
Laurel	Bulldogs	Laurel	Laurel, Bethel
Seaford	Blue Jays	Seaford	Seaford, Blades
Sussex Academy of Arts and Sciences	Seahawks	Georgetown	Statewide - Charter school with lottery-selected admission
Woodbridge	Blue Raiders	Bridgeville	Bridgeville, Greenwood, Farmington

=== Membership timeline ===
Full members Full members (non-football) Assoc. members (football only) Assoc. member (list sports)

== Conference history ==
The Henlopen Conference was created in the January 1959 as a conference of Sussex County schools with enrollments under 350. The conference began its first interleague conference play with the start of the 1959 high school baseball season. The initial members of the Henlopen Conference were the Bridgeville Mustangs, Rehoboth Beach Seahawks, Milton Warriors, Greenwood Foresters, Delmar Wildcats, Millsboro Blue Devils, John M. Clayton Bears, Lord Baltimore Lords, and Selbyville Rebels. While an initial member of the newly formed conference, the Delmar Wildcats did not join the conference for interleague conference play until the beginning of the 1959–60 basketball season. Two weeks later, on February 3, 1959, the Harrington Lions and Felton Green Devils were admitted, expanding the league into Kent County. The Dover Air Force Base Falcons joined two years after its formation.

In 1969, additional teams were added as the Diamond State Conference, originally formed by the larger schools of Kent and Sussex County, merged with the Henlopen Conference. These were: Smyrna, Dover, Caesar Rodney, Milford, Seaford, Lewes, Georgetown and Middletown; Middletown being the lone member from New Castle County. Lewes and Georgetown were the first schools that decided to migrate from the Diamond State Conference and join and eventually every team from the Diamond State Conference (except for Middletown) joined the Henlopen Conference. Middletown, as the only New Castle County school, moved to a conference composed entirely of New Castle County schools after one year of playing as an independent because they were barred from joining the Henlopen Conference due to the conference by-laws regarding geography.

Because of the state mandated school district mergers of 1969–70, the teams changed their geographical makeup. Lewes, Milton, and Rehoboth Beach merged to form the Cape Henlopen Vikings. Georgetown, John M. Clayton, and a large part of the Millsboro School District merged to become the Sussex Central Golden Knights (the other portion of Millsboro was absorbed into Cape Henlopen). Greenwood and Bridgeville merged to become the Woodbridge Blue Raiders. Harrington and Felton merged with Frederica to become the Lake Forest Spartans. Lord Baltimore and Selbyville were merged with Frankford and Dagsboro to become the Indian River Indians. The Milford School District also joined the conference after merging with the Ellendale and Houston school districts, keeping the Milford Buccaneers name. Magnolia and Oak Point merged with Caesar Rodney in 1969 and Dover Air Force Base high school students were absorbed into the Caesar Rodney High School after the United States government closed down the base's school in the 1980s. The Polytech Panthers (1992) and Sussex Tech Ravens (1995) joined the conference with the addition of their sports teams when the schools made the transition from vocational trade schools to technical and academic schools. In August 2015, the Sussex Academy of Arts and Sciences became the newest school, and first charter school, to join the Henlopen Conference.

Of note is that not all teams joined the conference immediately at its inception, affecting the number of conference championships the teams could have won.

== Football ==
=== Football history ===
Since 1969, teams in the Henlopen Conference have won a total of 25 state football championships. The south leads the north in championships 16 to 9. Caesar Rodney leads the northern division with three Division I Championships and Delmar leads the southern division with six Division II Championships. Woodbridge High School was the last team to win a state championship in 2016.

Only three times has the conference swept the Division I and Division II championship. In 1988, Dover from the North and Indian River from the South were the first to do it. In 2008, Caesar Rodney (North) and Milford (South) accomplished the feat. In the 2008 championship games, both Caesar Rodney and Milford defeated Sussex Central and Laurel to win their respective championships, marking the only time the final four teams in the state tournament were from the Henlopen Conference. In the latest occasion, Woodbridge won the Division II championship and Smyrna won the Division I championship in 2016.

Seaford High School is the only school in the conference to win both a Division I and II Championship.

=== 2006 Lake Forest forfeits ===
In 2006 Lake Forest High School had to temporarily shut down their varsity football team due to allegations of use of painkillers. Lake Forest forfeited their final eight games for that season.

=== Milford controversy ===
Prior to the 2007–08 school year, Milford was moved to the Henlopen South while Smyrna joined the Northern Division due to changes in enrollment. On September 30, 2008, those numbers were rechecked and confirmed to determine the assignments for the 2009–10 and 2010-11 school years. With only a total of 8 students separating the seventh and eighth largest schools, with Polytech coming in a 1,164 and Milford at 1,156; the conference assignments were certified to stay the same through June 2011. This included Polytech in the North Division and Milford in the South.

Days prior to the Division 2 Championship game, Polytech High School challenged the enrollment numbers that were submitted by Milford High School. Polytech brought their case to the athletic directors of the Henlopen Conference schools in a monthly meeting, and Milford argued their case as to why the numbers were correct. At the center of Polytech's argument were 17 students of the Intensive Learning Center, a separate school from Milford High School for special needs and mentally challenged students that rented space inside Milford High. The Polytech officials argued that those students were in the building and should be counted, the Milford officials argued that it was a separate school and that the State of Delaware did not count those children in Milford's enrollment nor did Milford receive funding for them.

A vote was held by the athletic directors of the various schools in the conference, all of the directors in the South voted Milford should move up to the North except Laurel High School; all of the directors in the North said Milford should stay down except for Polytech High School, which made it a 6–6 vote as Milford was not allowed to vote. However, the director for Sussex Central wasn't present for the meeting, so the director for Indian River High School was allowed to vote twice as Indian River High School and Sussex Central High School are in the same school district. The director voted two times that Milford move to the North Division and the vote was confirmed.
In December 2008, Milford appealed to the superintendents of the schools comprising the Henlopen Conference. The superintendents voted to uphold the decision of the athletic directors as it was an athletics issue. Milford also appealed to the Delaware Interscholastic Athletic Association, the governing body for athletics in Delaware schools. The DIAA decided that the matter needed to be handled by the Henlopen Conference and that they would not be involved.
On April 15, 2009, Milford High School filed a lawsuit against the Henlopen Conference in Chancery Court challenging that the vote was against the conference by-laws. In the lawsuit, Milford is listed as seeking "declaratory relief" and to have the vote to change the conference alignments nullified, placing Milford High School back in the South Division. On July 2, that lawsuit was dismissed.

=== Historical Henlopen Conference football records ===
==== 1950s ====
===== 1959 Regular season Football Standings =====
Henlopen Conference

School	Team	Conference record	Overall record	Season Outcome
Bridgeville	Mustangs	6 - 0	6 - 3	No playoffs
Rehoboth Beach	Seahawks	5 - 1	5 - 4	No playoffs
Millsboro	Blue Devils	4 - 2	6 - 2	No playoffs
Harrington	Lions	2 - 3 - 1	3 - 4 - 1	No playoffs
Lord Baltimore	Lords	2 - 4	3 - 6	No playoffs
John M. Clayton	Bears	1 - 4 - 1	2 - 5 - 1	No playoffs
Selbyville	Rebels	0 - 6	0 - 6	No playoffs

==== 1960s ====
===== 1960 Regular season Football Standings =====
Henlopen Conference

School	Team	Conference record	Overall record	Season Outcome
Millsboro	Blue Devils	6 - 1		No playoffs
Rehoboth Beach	Seahawks	6 - 1		No playoffs
Delmar	Wildcats	5 - 2		No playoffs
Bridgeville	Mustangs	4 - 3		No playoffs
John M. Clayton	Bears	4 - 3		No playoffs
Harrington	Lions	1 - 6		No playoffs
Lord Baltimore	Lords	1 - 6		No playoffs
Selbyville	Rebels	1 - 6		No playoffs

===== 1961 Regular season Football Standings =====
Henlopen Conference

School	Team	Conference record	Overall record	Season Outcome
Rehoboth Beach	Seahawks	7 - 0		No playoffs
John M. Clayton	Bears	6 - 1		No playoffs
Millsboro	Blue Devils	5 - 2		No playoffs
Bridgeville	Mustangs	4 - 3		No playoffs
Delmar	Wildcats	3 - 4		No playoffs
Harrington	Lions	1 - 5 - 1		No playoffs
Selbyville	Rebels	1 - 5 - 1		No playoffs
Lord Baltimore	Lords	0 - 7		No playoffs

===== 1962 Regular season Football Standings =====
Henlopen Conference

School	Team	Conference record	Overall record	Season Outcome
Millsboro	Blue Devils	6 - 0 - 1		No playoffs
John M. Clayton	Bears	5 - 0 - 2		No playoffs
Bridgeville	Mustangs	4 - 3		No playoffs
Delmar	Wildcats	4 - 3		No playoffs
Rehoboth Beach	Seahawks	3 - 3 - 1		No playoffs
Lord Baltimore	Lords	3 - 4		No playoffs
Harrington	Lions	0 - 6 - 1		No playoffs
Selbyville	Rebels	0 - 6 - 1		No playoffs

===== 1963 Regular season Football Standings =====
Henlopen Conference

School	Team	Conference record	Overall record	Season Outcome
John M. Clayton	Bears	7 - 0	8 - 0	No playoffs
Millsboro	Blue Devils	6 - 1	7 - 2	No playoffs
Bridgeville	Mustangs	3 - 2 - 2	5 - 2 - 2	No playoffs
Rehoboth Beach	Seahawks	3 - 3 - 1	3 - 3 - 1	No playoffs
Harrington	Lions	3 - 4	3 - 5	No playoffs
Lord Baltimore	Lords	2 - 4 - 1	3 - 4 - 1	No playoffs
Delmar	Wildcats	1 - 6	1 - 8	No playoffs
Selbyville	Rebels	1 - 6	3 - 6	No playoffs

===== 1964 Regular season Football Standings =====
Henlopen Conference

School	Team	Conference record	Overall record	Season Outcome
Harrington	Lions	8 - 0 - 1	8 - 0 - 1	No playoffs
Bridgeville	Mustangs	7 - 1 - 1	7 - 1 - 1	No playoffs
Millsboro	Blue Devils	5 - 2 - 1	5 - 2 - 1	No playoffs
Dover Air Force	Falcons	5 - 4	5 - 4	No playoffs
John M. Clayton	Bears	3 - 3 - 3	3 - 3 - 3	No playoffs
Rehoboth Beach	Seahawks	3 - 3 - 3	3 - 3 - 3	No playoffs
Delmar	Wildcats	4 - 4	4 - 4	No playoffs
Selbyville	Rebels	1 - 6 - 1	1 - 6 - 1	No playoffs
Milton	Warriors	1 - 5	1 - 5	No playoffs
Lord Baltimore	Lords	0 - 9	0 - 9	No playoffs

===== 1965 Regular season Football Standings =====
Henlopen Conference

School	Team	Conference record	Overall record	Season Outcome
Delmar	Wildcats	8 - 1	8 - 1	No playoffs
John M. Clayton	Bears	7 - 1 - 1	7 - 1 - 1	No playoffs
Dover Air Force	Falcons	6 - 3	6 - 3	No playoffs
Lord Baltimore	Lords	5 - 4	5 - 4	No playoffs
Rehoboth Beach	Seahawks	5 - 4	5 - 4	No playoffs
Harrington	Lions	4 - 5	4 - 5	No playoffs
Millsboro	Blue Devils	4 - 5	4 - 5	No playoffs
Bridgeville	Mustangs	3 - 5 - 1	3 - 5 - 1	No playoffs
Milton	Warriors	2 - 7	2 - 7	No playoffs
Selbyville	Rebels	0 - 9	0 - 9	No playoffs

==== 2000s ====
===== 2002 Regular season Football Standings =====
Henlopen Northern Division

School	Team	Division Record	Overall record	Season Outcome
Sussex Central	Golden Knights	5 - 0	9 - 2	Loss in semifinals of Div. I playoffs
Caesar Rodney	Riders	4 - 1	6 - 4	Failed to make playoffs
Dover	Senators	3 - 2	5 - 5	Failed to make playoffs
Sussex Tech	Ravens	2 - 3	4 - 6	Failed to make playoffs
Cape Henlopen	Vikings	1 - 4	2 - 8	Failed to make playoffs
Seaford	Blue Jays	0 - 5	2 - 8	Failed to make playoffs

Henlopen Southern Division

School	Team	Division Record	Overall record	Season Outcome
Delmar	Wildcats	6 - 0	10 - 0	Won Div. II State Championship
Laurel	Bulldogs	5 - 1	9 - 2	Loss in semifinals of Div. II playoffs
Smyrna	Eagles	4 - 2	8 - 2	Failed to make playoffs
Milford	Buccaneers	2 - 4	5 - 5	Failed to make playoffs
Indian River	Indians	2 - 4	4 - 6	Failed to make playoffs
Lake Forest	Spartans	2 - 4	4 - 6	Failed to make playoffs
Woodbridge	Blue Raiders	0 - 6	2 - 8	Failed to make playoffs

===== 2003 Regular season Football Standings =====
Henlopen Northern Division

School	Team	Division Record	Overall record	Season Outcome
Caesar Rodney	Riders	5 - 0	9 - 2	Loss in first round of Div. I playoffs
Sussex Central	Golden Knights	4 - 1	8 - 2	Failed to make playoffs
Dover	Senators	3 - 2	5 - 5	Failed to make playoffs
Sussex Tech	Ravens	2 - 3	5 - 5	Failed to make playoffs
Cape Henlopen	Vikings	1 - 4	2 - 8	Failed to make playoffs
Seaford	Blue Jays	0 - 5	3 - 7	Failed to make playoffs

Henlopen Southern Division

School	Team	Division Record	Overall record	Season Outcome
Smyrna	Eagles	5 - 1	9 - 2	Loss in semifinals of Div. II playoffs
Indian River	Indians	5 - 1	7 - 4	Loss in semifinals of Div. II playoffs
Lake Forest	Spartans	4 - 2	6 - 4	Failed to make playoffs
Milford	Buccaneers	3 - 3	5 - 5	Failed to make playoffs
Laurel	Bulldogs	3 - 3	4 - 6	Failed to make playoffs
Woodbridge	Blue Raiders	1 - 5	2 - 7	Failed to make playoffs
Delmar	Wildcats	0 - 6	1 - 9	Failed to make playoffs

===== 2004 Regular season Football Standings =====
Henlopen Northern Division

School	Team	Division Record	Overall record	Season Outcome
Caesar Rodney	Riders	5 – 0	9 – 2	Loss in semifinals of Div. I playoffs
Sussex Tech	Ravens	4 – 1	7 – 4	Loss in first round of Div. I playoffs
Milford	Buccaneers	3 – 2	7 – 3	Failed to make playoffs
Sussex Central	Golden Knights	2 – 3	5 – 5	Failed to make playoffs
Dover	Senators	1 – 4	3 – 7	Failed to make playoffs
Cape Henlopen	Vikings	0 – 5	0 – 10	Failed to make playoffs

Henlopen Southern Division

School	Team	Division Record	Overall record	Season Outcome
Indian River	Indians	5 – 1	8 – 4	Loss in semifinals of Div. II playoffs
Woodbridge	Blue Raiders	4 – 2	7 – 3	Failed to make playoffs
Smyrna	Eagles	4 – 2	7 – 4	Loss in first round of Div. II playoffs
Laurel	Bulldogs	4 – 2	7 – 4	Loss in first round of Div. II playoffs
Delmar	Wildcats	2 – 4	3 – 7	Failed to make playoffs
Seaford	Blue Jays	1 – 5	3 – 7	Failed to make playoffs
Lake Forest	Spartans	1 – 5	3 – 7	Failed to make playoffs

Delaware high school playoffs were expanded from a four team field in both Division I and Division II to six team field for both divisions beginning with the 2004 season.

===== 2005 Regular season Football Standings =====
Henlopen Northern Division

School	Team	Division Record	Overall record	Season Outcome
Dover	Senators	5 – 0	8 – 3	Loss in first round of Div. I playoffs
Caesar Rodney	Riders	3 – 2	4 – 6	Failed to make playoffs
Sussex Central	Golden Knights	2 – 3	6 – 5	Loss in first round of Div. I playoffs
Sussex Tech	Ravens	2 – 3	5 – 5	Failed to make playoffs
Cape Henlopen	Vikings	2 – 3	4 – 6	Failed to make playoffs
Milford	Buccaneers	1 – 4	4 – 6	Failed to make playoffs

Henlopen Southern Division

School	Team	Division Record	Overall record	Season Outcome
Indian River	Indians	6 – 0	9 – 2	Loss in semifinals of Div. II playoffs
Laurel	Bulldogs	5 – 1	8 – 3	Loss in first round of Div. II playoffs
Delmar	Wildcats	4 – 2	8 – 2	Failed to make playoffs
Lake Forest	Spartans	3 – 3	4 – 6	Failed to make playoffs
Smyrna	Eagles	2 – 4	5 – 5	Failed to make playoffs
Woodbridge	Blue Raiders	1 – 5	3 – 7	Failed to make playoffs
Seaford	Blue Jays	0 – 6	0 – 10	Failed to make playoffs

===== 2006 Regular season Football Standings =====
Henlopen Northern Division

School	Team	Division Record	Overall record	Season Outcome
Sussex Central	Golden Knights	5 – 0	11 – 1	Loss in Div. I Championship Game
Milford	Buccaneers	3 – 2	6 – 4	Failed to make playoffs
Cape Henlopen	Vikings	3 – 2	5 – 5	Failed to make playoffs
Caesar Rodney	Riders	2 – 3	5 – 5	Failed to make playoffs
Dover	Senators	3 – 3	5 – 5	Failed to make playoffs
Sussex Tech	Ravens	0 – 5	2 – 8	Failed to make playoffs

Henlopen Southern Division

School	Team	Division Record	Overall record	Season Outcome
Delmar	Wildcats	6 – 0	11 – 1	Loss in Div. II Championship Game
Indian River	Indians	5 – 1	8 – 3	Loss in first round of Div. II playoffs
Woodbridge	Blue Raiders	4 – 2	6 – 4	Failed to make playoffs
Laurel	Bulldogs	3 – 3	6 – 4	Failed to make playoffs
Smyrna	Eagles	2 – 4	3 – 7	Failed to make playoffs
Seaford	Blue Jays	1 – 5	2 – 8	Failed to make playoffs
Lake Forest	Spartans	1 – 5	1 – 9	Failed to make playoffs

===== 2007 Regular season Football Standings =====
Henlopen Northern Division

School	Team	Division Record	Overall record	Season Outcome
Sussex Central	Golden Knights	6 – 0	10 – 2	Loss in Div. I Championship Game
Caesar Rodney	Riders	4 – 2	6 – 5	Loss in first round of Div. I playoffs
Sussex Tech	Ravens	4 – 2	7 – 3	Failed to make playoffs
Dover	Senators	3 – 3	5 – 5	Failed to make playoffs
Cape Henlopen	Vikings	3 – 3	4 – 6	Failed to make playoffs
Smyrna	Eagles	1 – 5	3 – 7	Failed to make playoffs
Polytech	Panthers	0 – 6	2 – 8	Failed to make playoffs

Henlopen Southern Division

School	Team	Division Record	Overall record	Season Outcome
Delmar	Wildcats	6 – 0	10 – 1	Loss in semifinals of Div. II playoffs
Indian River	Indians	5 – 1	8 – 3	Loss in first round of Div. II playoffs
Milford	Buccaneers	4 – 2	6 – 4	Failed to make playoffs
Woodbridge	Blue Raiders	3 – 3	4 – 6	Failed to make playoffs
Laurel	Bulldogs	2 – 4	5 – 5	Failed to make playoffs
Lake Forest	Spartans	1 – 5	1 – 9	Failed to make playoffs
Seaford	Blue Jays	0 – 6	1 – 9	Failed to make playoffs

===== 2008 Regular season Football Standings =====
Henlopen Northern Division

School	Team	Division Record	Overall record	Season Outcome
Sussex Central	Golden Knights	6 – 0	10 – 2	Loss in Div. I Championship Game
Caesar Rodney	Riders	5 – 1	11 – 1	Won Div. I State Championship
Dover	Senators	4 – 2	6 – 4	Failed to make playoffs
Smyrna	Eagles	2 – 4	5 – 5	Failed to make playoffs
Sussex Tech	Ravens	2 – 4	4 – 6	Failed to make playoffs
Cape Henlopen	Vikings	2 – 4	3 – 7	Failed to make playoffs
Polytech	Panthers	0 – 6	2 – 8	Failed to make playoffs

Henlopen Southern Division

School	Team	Division Record	Overall record	Season Outcome
Milford	Buccaneers	5 – 1	10 – 2	Won Div. II State Championship
Laurel	Bulldogs	5 – 1	9 – 3	Loss in Div. II State Championship Game
Indian River	Indians	4 – 2	7 – 4	Loss in first round of Div. II playoffs
Delmar	Wildcats	4 – 2	8 – 2	Failed to make playoffs
Seaford	Blue Jays	2 – 4	2 – 8	Failed to make playoffs
Lake Forest	Spartans	1 – 5	3 – 7	Failed to make playoffs
Woodbridge	Blue Raiders	0 – 6	0 – 10	Failed to make playoffs

The week one meeting between Milford and St. Marks (Wilmington, Delaware) was ranked the #10 matchup in the nation by MaxPreps.

===== 2009 Regular season Football Standings =====
Henlopen Northern Division

School	Team	Division Record	Overall record	Season Outcome
Sussex Tech	Ravens	5 – 1	9 – 2	Loss in first round of Div. I playoffs
Caesar Rodney	Riders	5 – 1	8 – 4	Loss in semifinals of Div. I playoffs
Milford	Buccaneers	5 – 1	6 – 4	Failed to make playoffs
Sussex Central	Golden Knights	2 – 4	6 – 4	Failed to make playoffs
Dover	Senators	2 – 4	4 – 6	Failed to make playoffs
Smyrna	Eagles	2 – 4	2 – 8	Failed to make playoffs
Cape Henlopen	Vikings	0 – 6	1 – 9	Failed to make playoffs

Henlopen Southern Division

School	Team	Division Record	Overall record	Season Outcome
Delmar	Wildcats	6 – 0	10 – 3	Won Div. II State Championship
Laurel	Bulldogs	5 – 1	8 – 3	Loss in semifinals of Div. II playoffs
Lake Forest	Spartans	4 – 2	7 – 3	Failed to make playoffs
Indian River	Indians	3 – 3	5 – 5	Failed to make playoffs
Seaford	Blue Jays	2 – 4	4 – 6	Failed to make playoffs
Polytech	Panthers	1 – 5	1 – 9	Failed to make playoffs
Woodbridge	Blue Raiders	0 – 6	3 – 7	Failed to make playoffs

==== 2010s ====
===== 2010 Regular season Football Standings =====
Henlopen Northern Division

School	Team	Division Record	Overall record	Season Outcome
Sussex Central	Golden Knights	5 – 1	7 – 4	Loss in first round of Div. I playoffs
Caesar Rodney	Riders	5 – 1	7 – 4	Loss in first round of Div. I playoffs
Dover	Senators	3 – 3	6 – 4	Failed to make playoffs
Sussex Tech	Ravens	3 – 3	5 – 5	Failed to make playoffs
Cape Henlopen	Vikings	2 – 4	5 – 5	Failed to make playoffs
Smyrna	Eagles	2 – 4	4 – 6	Failed to make playoffs
Milford	Buccaneers	1 – 5	3 – 7	Failed to make playoffs

Henlopen Southern Division

School	Team	Division Record	Overall record	Season Outcome
Lake Forest	Spartans	5 – 1	8 – 3	Loss in first round of Div. II playoffs
Delmar	Wildcats	4 – 2	8 – 4	Loss in semifinals of Div. II playoffs
Laurel	Bulldogs	4 – 2	5 – 5	Failed to make playoffs
Indian River	Indians	4 – 2	5 – 5	Failed to make playoffs
Polytech	Panthers	3 – 3	4 – 6	Failed to make playoffs
Woodbridge	Blue Raiders	1 – 5	3 – 7	Failed to make playoffs
Seaford	Blue Jays	0 – 6	2 – 8	Failed to make playoffs

===== 2011 Regular season Football Standings =====
Henlopen Northern Division

School	Team	Division Record	Overall record	Season Outcome
Sussex Central	Golden Knights	6 – 0	7 – 4	Loss in first round of Div. I playoffs
Dover	Senators	5 – 1	8 – 4	Loss in semifinals of Div. I playoffs
Cape Henlopen	Vikings	4 – 2	8 – 2	Failed to make playoffs
Caesar Rodney	Riders	3 – 3	3 – 7	Failed to make playoffs
Smyrna	Eagles	2 – 4	5 – 5	Failed to make playoffs
Sussex Tech	Ravens	1 – 5	4 – 6	Failed to make playoffs
Milford	Buccaneers	0 – 6	1 – 9	Failed to make playoffs

Henlopen Southern Division

School	Team	Division Record	Overall record	Season Outcome
Indian River	Indians	6 – 0	12 – 0	Won Div. II State Championship
Delmar	Wildcats	5 – 1	9 – 2	Loss in first round of Div. II playoffs
Laurel	Bulldogs	4 – 2	4 – 6	Failed to make playoffs
Lake Forest	Spartans	3 – 3	5 – 5	Failed to make playoffs
Polytech	Panthers	2 – 4	2 – 8	Failed to make playoffs
Woodbridge	Blue Raiders	1 – 5	2 – 8	Failed to make playoffs
Seaford	Blue Jays	0 – 6	0 – 10	Failed to make playoffs

===== 2012 Regular season Football Standings =====
Henlopen Northern Division

School	Team	Division Record	Overall record	Season Outcome
Sussex Central	Golden Knights	5 – 1	8 – 3	Loss in first round of Div. I playoffs
Cape Henlopen	Vikings	5 – 1	8 – 3	Loss in first round of Div. I playoffs
Caesar Rodney	Riders	5 – 1	8 – 4	Loss in semi-finals of Div. I playoffs
Dover	Senators	3 – 3	5 – 5	Failed to make playoffs
Sussex Tech	Ravens	2 – 4	3 – 7	Failed to make playoffs
Smyrna	Eagles	1 – 5	4 – 6	Failed to make playoffs
Milford	Buccaneers	0 – 6	3 – 7	Failed to make playoffs

Henlopen Southern Division

School	Team	Division Record	Overall record	Season Outcome
Indian River	Indians	6 – 0	9 – 3	Loss in semi-finals of Div. II playoffs
Delmar	Wildcats	5 – 1	7 – 3	Failed to make playoffs
Lake Forest	Spartans	4 – 2	5 – 5	Failed to make playoffs
Laurel	Bulldogs	3 – 3	4 – 6	Failed to make playoffs
Woodbridge	Blue Raiders	2 – 4	2 – 8	Failed to make playoffs
Seaford	Blue Jays	1 – 5	1 – 9	Failed to make playoffs
Polytech	Panthers	0 – 6	1 – 9	Failed to make playoffs

===== 2013 Regular season Football Standings =====
Henlopen Northern Division

School	Team	Division Record	Overall record	Season Outcome
Caesar Rodney	Riders	6 – 0	8 – 4	Loss in semi-finals of Div. I playoffs
Dover	Senators	5 – 1	9 – 3	Loss in semi-finals of Div. I playoffs
Cape Henlopen	Vikings	4 – 2	6 – 4	Failed to make playoffs
Sussex Tech	Ravens	3 – 3	5 – 5	Failed to make playoffs
Sussex Central	Golden Knights	2 – 4	5 – 5	Failed to make playoffs
Polytech	Panthers	1 – 5	5 – 5	Failed to make playoffs
Smyrna	Eagles	0 – 6	2 – 8	Failed to make playoffs

Henlopen Southern Division

School	Team	Division Record	Overall record	Season Outcome
Indian River	Indians	5 – 1	6 – 5	Loss in first round of Div. II playoffs
Delmar	Wildcats	5 – 1	9 – 2	Loss in first round of Div. II playoffs
Woodbridge	Blue Raiders	4 – 2	8 – 4	Loss in semi-finals of Div. II playoffs
Lake Forest	Spartans	4 – 2	6 – 4	Failed to make playoffs
Laurel	Bulldogs	2 – 4	2 – 8	Failed to make playoffs
Milford	Buccaneers	1 – 5	1 – 9	Failed to make playoffs
Seaford	Blue Jays	0 – 6	3 – 7	Failed to make playoffs

===== 2014 Regular season Football Standings =====
Henlopen Northern Division

School	Team	Division Record	Overall record	Season Outcome
Sussex Tech	Ravens	6 – 0	10 – 2	Loss in semifinals of Div. I playoffs
Cape Henlopen	Vikings	4 – 2	8 – 2	Failed to make playoffs
Smyrna	Eagles	3 – 3	5 – 5	Failed to make playoffs
Sussex Central	Golden Knights	3 – 3	5 – 5	Failed to make playoffs
Caesar Rodney	Riders	2 – 4	2 – 8	Failed to make playoffs
Dover	Senators	2 - 4	3 - 7	Failed to make playoffs
Polytech	Panthers	1 – 5	4 – 6	Failed to make playoffs

Henlopen Southern Division

School	Team	Division Record	Overall record	Season Outcome
Lake Forest	Spartans	6 – 0	10 – 1	Loss in first round of Div. II playoffs
Laurel	Bulldogs	5 – 1	10 – 3	Loss in Div. II Championship Game
Delmar	Wildcats	4 – 2	5 – 5	Failed to make playoffs
Indian River	Indians	3 - 3	4 - 6	Failed to make playoffs
Woodbridge	Blue Raiders	2 – 4	4 – 6	Failed to make playoffs
Milford	Buccaneers	1 – 5	1 – 9	Failed to make playoffs
Seaford	Blue Jays	0 – 6	1 – 9	Failed to make playoffs

===== 2015 Regular season Football Standings =====
Henlopen Northern Division

School	Team	Division Record	Overall record	Season Outcome
Smyrna	Eagles	6 – 0	12 –	Won Div. I State Championship
Sussex Tech	Ravens	5 – 1	8 – 3	Loss in first round of Div. I playoffs
Sussex Central	Golden Knights	4 – 2	6 – 4	Failed to make playoffs
Cape Henlopen	Vikings	3 – 3	5 – 4	Failed to make playoffs
Dover	Senators	2 – 4	4 – 6	Failed to make playoffs
Caesar Rodney	Riders	1 - 5	2 - 8	Failed to make playoffs
Polytech	Panthers	0 – 6	0 – 10	Failed to make playoffs

Henlopen Southern Division

School	Team	Division Record	Overall record	Season Outcome
Lake Forest	Spartans	6 – 0	8 – 3	Loss in first round of Div. II playoffs
Woodbridge	Blue Raiders	5 – 1	8 – 4	Loss in semifinals of Div. II playoffs
Indian River	Indians	4 – 2	4 – 6	Failed to make playoffs
Milford	Buccaneers	3 - 3	6 - 4	Failed to make playoffs
Laurel	Bulldogs	2 – 4	3 – 7	Failed to make playoffs
Delmar	Wildcats	1 – 5	1 – 9	Failed to make playoffs
Seaford	Blue Jays	0 – 6	0 – 10	Failed to make playoffs

=== Henlopen Conference Football Championships (By Year) ===
Of note: Teams with a gold background went on to win the State Championship.

Year	Henlopen South (Div II)	Henlopen North (Div I)
2020	Woodbridge	Smyrna
2019	Delmar	Smyrna
2018	Woodbridge	Sussex Central
2017	Delmar	Smyrna
2016	Woodbridge	Smyrna
2015	Lake Forest	Smyrna
2014	Lake Forest	Sussex Tech
2013	Indian River	Caesar Rodney
2012	Indian River	Sussex Central
2011	Indian River	Sussex Central
2010	Lake Forest	Sussex Central
2009	Delmar	Sussex Tech
2008	Milford	Sussex Central
2007	Delmar	Sussex Central
2006	Delmar	Sussex Central
2005	Indian River	Dover
2004	Indian River	Caesar Rodney
2003	Indian River	Caesar Rodney
2002	Delmar	Sussex Central
2001	Delmar	Dover
2000	Delmar	Caesar Rodney
1999	Woodbridge	Caesar Rodney
1998	Delmar	Cape Henlopen
1997	Delmar	Cape Henlopen
1996	Delmar	Caesar Rodney
1995	Delmar	Caesar Rodney
1994	Seaford	Caesar Rodney
1993	Laurel	Seaford
1992	Laurel	Seaford
1991	Lake Forest	Caesar Rodney
1990	Lake Forest	Caesar Rodney
1989	Lake Forest	Caesar Rodney
1988	Indian River	Dover
1987	Indian River	Seaford
1986	Laurel, Indian River, Smyrna	Seaford, Caesar Rodney, Dover
1985	Delmar	Seaford
1984	Lake Forest	Cape Henlopen
1983	Seaford	Caesar Rodney
1982	Seaford	Dover, Cape Henlopen
1981	Lake Forest	Seaford
1980	Indian River	Caesar Rodney
1979	Indian River	Cape Henlopen
1978	Dover Air Force Base***	Caesar Rodney
1977	Smyrna	Caesar Rodney
1976	Delmar	Caesar Rodney
1975	Smyrna	Caesar Rodney
1974	Smyrna	Milford
1973	Smyrna	Caesar Rodney, Sussex Central
1972	Lake Forest	Dover
1971	Laurel	Dover
1970	Indian River	Sussex Central
1969	Indian River	Smyrna

(*** Dover Air Force High School shut down operations and merged with Caesar Rodney High School. The two schools have always been in the same school district.)

Prior to 1969 there were no North and South divisions, simply an overall champion. They were:

Year	Henlopen Conference Champion
1968	Indian River
1967	Bridgeville (Woodbridge)
1966	Bridgeville (Woodbridge)
1965	Delmar
1964	Harrington (Lake Forest)
1963	John M. Clayton (Indian River)
1962	Millsboro / John M. Clayton (Sussex Central / Indian River)
1961	Rehoboth (Cape Henlopen)
1960	Millsboro / Rehoboth (Sussex Central / Cape Henlopen)
1959	Bridgeville (Woodbridge)

Note that of those pre-1969 teams listed above, only Indian River and Delmar still exist as school districts today, with Indian River's merger coming prior to the 1969–70 school year.

=== Total Henlopen Conference Football Championships ===
School	Division	Total	Notes
Caesar Rodney	North	19	Most all time in Northern Division
Cape Henlopen	North	7	Includes two wins by Rehoboth
Delmar	South	14	
Dover	North	6	
Dover AF	n/a	1	defunct
Indian River	South	16	Includes two won by John M Clayton – Most all time in the Southern Division
Lake Forest	South	10	Includes one won by Harrington
Laurel	South	4	
Milford	North	2	One in the North; One in the South
Polytech	South	0	
Seaford	South	9	Six in the North; Three in the South
Smyrna	North	9	Four in the North; Five in the South
Sussex Central	North	11	Includes two won by Millsboro
Sussex Tech	North	2	
Woodbridge	South	6	Includes three won by Bridgeville

=== Football rivalries ===
Battle of the Bell Milford vs. Lake Forest – Started in 1969 when the conferences were formed and school districts were consolidated. The winning team keeps the trophy, the bell off a train that used to run between Milford and Harrington, for a year until the next Battle of the Bell.

2013 Battle of the Bell Champion – Lake Forest (33-7)

Delaware's Oldest High School Rivalry Seaford vs. Laurel – The oldest rivalry game in the state, and said to be the third oldest rivalry in the nation, these two towns are separated by only 6 1/2 miles and a large turn-out is always expected.

2013 Delaware's Oldest High School Rivalry Champion – Laurel (46-6)

The Civil War Caesar Rodney vs. Dover – A cross-town rivalry game in Dover.

2013 Civil War Champion – Caesar Rodney (42-18)

The Battle for Georgetown Sussex Tech vs. Sussex Central – A cross-town rivalry game in Georgetown.

2013 Battle for Georgetown Champion – Sussex Tech (28-27)

The Tech Bowl Sussex Tech vs. Polytech – A rivalry game between Sussex County and Kent County's two technical high schools.

2013 Tech Bowl Champion – Sussex Tech (35-28)

The Harvest Bowl Smyrna vs. Middletown – A non-conference rivalry game going back to before the Henlopen Conference when the two teams played in the Diamond State Conference.

2012 Harvest Bowl Champion – Middletown (47-19)

- Did not play in 2013

Battle for the Lions Club Trophy Delmar vs. Laurel – The two towns are only 9 miles apart along U.S. 13 and the winner takes home a trophy sponsored by the local Lions Club.

2013 Battle for the Lions Club Trophy Champion – Delmar (21-20)

Intra-district Rivalry Sussex Central vs. Indian River – A rivalry game between the two schools that belong to the Indian River School District. The IRSD is one of the largest districts in the state of Delaware.

2013 Intra-district Rivalry Champion – Sussex Central (29-27)

== Wrestling championships ==
Year	Henlopen South	Henlopen North	Conference Dual Meet	Tournament champion
2011-12	Polytech	Caesar Rodney	No longer awarded	Caesar Rodney
2010-11	Seaford, Polytech, Indian River	Sussex Central	No longer awarded	Caesar Rodney
2009-10		Sussex Central	No longer awarded	Sussex Central
2008-09	Milford	Caesar Rodney	Caesar Rodney	Smyrna
2007-08	Indian River	Sussex Central	Sussex Central	Sussex Central
2006-07		Caesar Rodney	Caesar Rodney	Caesar Rodney
2005-06		Caesar Rodney	Caesar Rodney	Caesar Rodney
2004-05	Milford		Sussex Central	Sussex Central
2003-04	Laurel	Caesar Rodney	Sussex Central	Sussex Central
2002-03	Smyrna	Caesar Rodney	Caesar Rodney	Sussex Central
2001-02	Lake Forest	Caesar Rodney	Caesar Rodney	Sussex Central
2000-01	Milford	Caesar Rodney	Caesar Rodney	Caesar Rodney
1999-00	Milford	Caesar Rodney	Caesar Rodney	Caesar Rodney
1998	Smyrna	Caesar Rodney	Caesar Rodney	Caesar Rodney
1997	Smyrna	Caesar Rodney	Caesar Rodney	Caesar Rodney
1996	Smyrna	Caesar Rodney	Caesar Rodney	Caesar Rodney
1995	Smyrna	Sussex Central	Smyrna	Smyrna
1994	Smyrna	Dover	Dover	Dover
1993	Smyrna	Dover	Dover	Dover
1992	Smyrna	Dover	Dover	Dover
1991	Smyrna	Dover	Smyrna	Dover
1990	Smyrna	Cape Henlopen	Smyrna	Smyrna
1989	Smyrna	Sussex Central	Smyrna	Smyrna
1988	Smyrna	Dover	Dover	Dover
1987	Smyrna	Dover	Smyrna	Dover
1986	Smyrna	Dover	Smyrna	Dover
1985	Smyrna	Caesar Rodney	Caesar Rodney	Caesar Rodney
1984	Smyrna	Caesar Rodney	Caesar Rodney	Caesar Rodney
1983	Laurel	Caesar Rodney	Caesar Rodney	Caesar Rodney
1982	Smyrna	Caesar Rodney	Caesar Rodney	Caesar Rodney
1981	Smyrna	Milford	Milford	None
1980	Smyrna	Milford	Milford	None
1979	Smyrna	Caesar Rodney	Smyrna	None
1978	Smyrna	Caesar Rodney	Smyrna	None
1977	Smyrna	Caesar Rodney	Caesar Rodney	None
1976	Smyrna	Sussex Central	Sussex Central	None
1975	Smyrna	Sussex Central	Smyrna	None
1974	Smyrna	Caesar Rodney	Caesar Rodney	None
1973	Smyrna	Caesar Rodney	Caesar Rodney	None
1972	Smyrna	Caesar Rodney	Smyrna, Caesar Rodney, Sussex Central	None
1971	Smyrna	Sussex Central	Smyrna	None
1970	Smyrna	Sussex Central	Smyrna	None
1969	None	None	None	Harrington
1968	None	None	None	?
1967	None	None	None	Delmar
1966	None	None	None	Harrington
1965	None	None	None	Delmar
1964	None	None	None	Millsboro

Prior to 1969 there were no conferences, simply a Tournament champion. In 1970 the school districts consolidated. Of those pre-1969 teams, only Indian River and Delmar still exist as school districts today, with Indian River's merger coming prior to 1969–70.

Total Division Championships:
Caesar Rodney – 21 (most all time in the North)
Cape Henlopen – 1
Delmar – 0
Dover – 7
Indian River – 2
Lake Forest – 0
Laurel – 2
Milford – 6 *Only team to win championships in both the North & South (2 in North, 4 in South)
Polytech – 0
Seaford – 0
Smyrna – 29 (Most by any school, in any conference, in any sport in the state)
Sussex Central – 7
Sussex Tech – 0
Woodbridge – 0

Conference Dual Meet Championships (Overall Champion):
Caesar Rodney – 16 (most all time)
Cape Henlopen – 0
Delmar – 0
Dover – 4
Indian River – 0
Lake Forest – 0
Laurel – 0
Milford – 2 *One of only 2 Sussex County schools to win overall championship
Polytech – 0
Seaford – 0
Smyrna – 12
Sussex Central – 5 *One of only 2 Sussex County schools to win overall championship
Sussex Tech – 0
Woodbridge – 0

Tournament championships:
Caesar Rodney – 10 (most all time)
Cape Henlopen – 0
Delmar – 2
Dover – 7
Indian River – 0
Lake Forest – 2 *Both won by Harrington prior to 1970 merger
Laurel – 0
Milford – 0
Polytech – 0
Seaford – 0
Smyrna – 4
Sussex Central – 4
Sussex Tech – 0
Woodbridge – 0

== Boys basketball championships ==
Year	Henlopen South Division	Henlopen North Division	Conference Championship Game	Conference Champion
2016-17	Woodbridge	Smyrna	Smyrna 61 - Woodbridge 51	Smyrna
2015-16				
2014-15				
2013-14 Woodbridge Boys Henlopen Conference Championship Beat Caesar Rodney				
2012-13				
2011-12		Smyrna		
2010-11	Polytech	Smyrna	Smyrna 46 – Polytech 41	Smyrna
2009-10	Polytech	Dover	Dover 71 – Polytech 55	Dover
2008-09	Woodbridge	Caesar Rodney	Caesar Rodney 41 – Woodbridge 35	Caesar Rodney
2007-08	Woodbridge	Sussex Central	Woodbridge 71 – Sussex Central 60	Woodbridge
2006-07				
2005-06	Smyrna	Cape Henlopen	Cape Henlopen 77 – Smyrna 52	Cape Henlopen
2004-05				
2003				
2002	Lake Forest	Sussex Tech	Sussex Tech 58 – Lake Forest 48	Sussex Tech
2001	Lake Forest	Sussex Central	Sussex Central 59 – Lake Forest 49	Sussex Central
2000	Lake Forest	Sussex Tech	Sussex Tech 73 – Lake Forest 62	Sussex Tech
1999	Lake Forest	Sussex Tech	Sussex Tech 63 – Lake Forest 50	Sussex Tech
1998	Indian River	Cape Henlopen	Cape Henlopen 77 – Indian River 64	Cape Henlopen
1997	Lake Forest	Cape Henlopen	Lake Forest 49 – Cape Henlopen 45	Lake Forest
1996	Indian River	Cape Henlopen	Indian River 74 – Cape Henlopen 72	Indian River
1995	Indian River	Cape Henlopen	Indian River 52 – Cape Henlopen 51	Indian River
1994	Indian River	Caesar Rodney	Caesar Rodney 67 – Indian River 65	Caesar Rodney
1993	Indian River	Sussex Central	Indian River 58 – Sussex Central 45	Indian River
1992	Lake Forest	Dover	Dover 53 – Lake Forest 48	Dover
1991	Indian River	Seaford	Indian River 69 – Seaford 59	Indian River
1990	Indian River	Seaford	Indian River 65 – Seaford 63	Indian River
1989	Indian River	Milford	Milford 82 – Indian River 73	Milford
1988	Woodbridge	Seaford	Seaford 61 – Woodbridge 50	Seaford
1987	Woodbridge	Seaford	Seaford 77 – Woodbridge 63	Seaford
1986	Smyrna	Seaford	Seaford 74 – Smyrna 66	Seaford
1985	Smyrna	Sussex Central	Smyrna 64 – Sussex Central 55	Smyrna
1984	Seaford	Caesar Rodney	Caesar Rodney 61 – Seaford 60	Caesar Rodney
1983	Woodbridge	Cape Henlopen	Cape Henlopen 92 – Woodbridge 80	Cape Henlopen
1982	Lake Forest	Cape Henlopen	Cape Henlopen 71 – Lake Forest 57	Cape Henlopen
1981	Indian River	Cape Henlopen	Cape Henlopen 67 – Indian River 66	Cape Henlopen
1980	Indian River	Cape Henlopen	Cape Henlopen 77 – Indian River 63	Cape Henlopen
1979	Indian River	Cape Henlopen	Cape Henlopen 49 – Indian River 36	Cape Henlopen
1978	Indian River	Dover	Dover 55 – Indian River 53	Dover
1977	Indian River	Dover	Dover 61 – Indian River 59	Dover
1976	Indian River	Cape Henlopen	Cape Henlopen 78 – Indian River 57	Cape Henlopen
1975	Indian River	Cape Henlopen	Cape Henlopen 64 – Indian River 52	Cape Henlopen
1974	Indian River	Cape Henlopen	Indian River 66 – Cape Henlopen 62	Indian River
1973	Woodbridge	Cape Henlopen	Woodbridge 63 – Cape Henlopen 62	Woodbridge
1972	Indian River	Dover	Dover 69 – Indian River 53	Dover
1971	Indian River	Milford	Milford 47 – Indian River 45	Milford
1970	Lake Forest	Milford	Lake Forest 69 – Milford 43	Lake Forest

Prior to 1970 the conference was broken down into East and West based on geographic location. An Eastern Division and Western Division Champion was declared and a championship game was played between the two to determine the Henlopen Conference Champion. No division champions were declared in 1960 and 1961, instead the team with the best record was named Henlopen Conference Champion.

Year	Henlopen West Division	Henlopen East Division	Conference Championship Game	Conference Champion
1969	Dover Air Force Base	Rehoboth	Dover Air Force Base 77 – Rehoboth 70	Dover Air Force Base
1968	Bridgeville	Milton	Bridgeville 65 – Milton 58	Bridgeville
1967	Bridgeville	Milton	Milton 54 – Bridgeville 52	Milton
1966	Felton	Milton	Milton 60 – Felton 58	Milton
1965	Felton	Milton	Felton 73 – Milton 58	Felton
1964	Felton	Lord Baltimore	Felton 81 – Lord Baltimore 59	Felton
1963	Felton	Rehoboth	Rehoboth 48 – Felton 44	Rehoboth
1962	Greenwood	Milton	Milton 46 – Greenwood 38	Milton
1961	No Division Champion	No Division Champion	No Game	Rehoboth
1960	No Division Champion	No Division Champion	No Game	Rehoboth

Note that of those pre-1969 teams listed above, none still exist as an independent school district.

Total division championships:
Caesar Rodney – 3 *Includes 1 won by Dover Air Force Base
Cape Henlopen – 21 *Includes 2 won by Rehoboth (does not included 1960 & 1961) and 5 won by Milton (Most in the North Division and all time)
Delmar – 0
Dover – 4
Indian River – 19 *Includes 1 won by Lord Baltimore (Most in the South Division)
Lake Forest – 10 *Includes 2 won by Felton
Laurel – 0
Milford – 3
Polytech – 2
Seaford – 4 (3 in North, 1 in South)
Smyrna – 6 (3 in North, 3 in South)
Sussex Central – 3
Sussex Tech – 3
Woodbridge – 7 *Includes 2 won by Bridgeville and 1 won by Greenwood

Total Henlopen Conference Championships:
Caesar Rodney – 3 *Includes 1 won by Dover Air Force Base
Cape Henlopen – 15 *Includes 3 won by Rehoboth and 3 won by Milton
Delmar – 0
Dover – 4
Indian River – 6
Lake Forest – 4 *Includes 2 won by Felton
Laurel – 0
Milford – 2
Polytech – 0
Seaford – 3
Smyrna – 3
Sussex Central – 1
Sussex Tech – 3
Woodbridge – 2 *Includes 1 won by Bridgeville

== Baseball championships ==
Year	Henlopen South Division	Henlopen North Division	Conference Champion
2009	Milford	Sussex Central	Sussex Central
2008	Indian River	Sussex Central	Indian River
2007	Indian River	Caesar Rodney	Caesar Rodney
2006	Indian River	Cape Henlopen	Cape Henlopen
2005	Indian River	Cape Henlopen	????
2004	Delmar	Caesar Rodney	Caesar Rodeny
2003	Laurel	Cape Henlopen	Cape Henlopen
2002	Seaford	Sussex Central	Seaford
2001	Seaford	Caesar Rodney	Caesar Rodney
2000	Laurel	Sussex Central	

== Boys State Championships ==
The following Henlopen Conference boys teams have gone on to win state championships (includes pre-merger teams). Of note, if (I/II) appears in the division category, all divisions play for the only state championship.

=== Baseball ===
Div I/Div II	School	Year
I/II	Dover Senators	1972
I/II	Caesar Rodney Riders	1975
I/II	Seaford Blue Jays	1980
I/II	Seaford Blue Jays	1983
I/II	Seaford Blue Jays	1986
I/II	Sussex Central Golden Knights	1989
I/II	Seaford Blue Jays	1993
I/II	Cape Henlopen Vikings	2018
I/II	Cape Henlopen Vikings	2022
I/II	Cape Henlopen Vikings	2025

=== Basketball ===
Div I/Div II	School	Year
I/II	Milford Buccaneers	1971
I/II	Cape Henlopen Vikings	1975
I/II	Cape Henlopen Vikings	1976
I/II	Indian River Indians	1980
I/II	Indian River Indians	1981
I/II	Caesar Rodney Riders	1984
I/II	Seaford Blue Jays	1997
I/II	Smyrna Eagles	2017

=== Cross Country ===
Div I/Div II	School	Year
II	Harrington Lions	1963
II	Harrington Lions	1966
II	Harrington Lions	1969
II	Dover Air Force Base Falcons	1971
II	Lake Forest Spartans	1973
II	Lake Forest Spartans	1974
II	Lake Forest Spartans	1975
II	Lake Forest Spartans	1976
II	Cape Henlopen Vikings	1977
II	Woodbridge Blue Raiders	1978

Div I/Div II	School	Year
II	Cape Henlopen Vikings	1979
II	Sussex Central Golden Knights	1980
II	Cape Henlopen Vikings	1982
II	Lake Forest Spartans	1983
II	Lake Forest Spartans	1986
II	Lake Forest Spartans	1992
II	Lake Forest Spartans	1993
II	Lake Forest Spartans	1996
II	Cape Henlopen Vikings	1999
II	Cape Henlopen Vikings	2001

Div I/Div II	School	Year
I	Cape Henlopen Vikings	2020

=== Football ===
Div I/Div II	School	Year
I	Caesar Rodney Riders	1975
II	Delmar Wildcats	1976
I	Dover Senators	1977
I	Cape Henlopen Vikings	1979
I	Seaford Blue Jays	1981
II	Seaford Blue Jays	1983
II	Delmar Wildcats	1985
II	Laurel Bulldogs	1986
II	Laurel Bulldogs	1987
I	Dover Senators	1988

Div I/Div II	School	Year
II	Indian River Indians	1988
I	Caesar Rodney Riders	1990
II	Laurel Bulldogs	1991
II	Sussex Tech Ravens	1993
II	Lake Forest Spartans	1995
II	Delmar Wildcats	2000
II	Delmar Wildcats	2001
II	Delmar Wildcats	2002
I	Caesar Rodney Riders	2008
II	Milford Buccaneers	2008

Div I/Div II/Unified	School	Year
II	Delmar Wildcats	2009
II	Indian River Indians	2011
I	Smyrna Eagles	2015
I	Smyrna Eagles	2016
II	Woodbridge Blue Raiders	2016
I	Smyrna Eagles	2017
II	Delmar Wildcats	2017
I	Sussex Central Golden Knights	2018
II	Woodbridge Blue Raiders	2018
Unified	Smyrna Eagles	2018

Div I/Div II/Unified	School	Year
Unified	Dover Senators	2019
I	Sussex Central Golden Knights	2020

- The Unified Division was added in 2016 and is a DIAA recognized athletic division partnering students with and without disabilities in conjunction with Special Olympics Delaware.

Class/Unified	School	Year
Unified	Dover Senators	2021
1A	Laurel Bulldogs	2021
Unified	Caesar Rodney Riders	2022
1A	Laurel Bulldogs	2022
3A	Smyrna Eagles	2022
Unified	Indian River Indians	2024
1A	Indian River Indians	2024

- In 2021 the Delaware Interscholastic Athletic Association changed the football championships from a two-tier format based on enrollment sizes to a three-tier format, Class 1A, Class 2A, and Class 3A. The new alignment formula is based on a weighted combination of enrollment and on winning percentages over the previous 4-seasons and 2-seasons. The schools with the largest enrollment and best winning percentages are placed in Class 3A, working down to those with the smallest enrollments and worst winning percentages, which are placed in Class 1A. With this change, teams no longer compete directly within the Henlopen Conference, and instead compete in districts determined by classification and geographic location within the state in relation to the other schools in their classification.

=== Golf ===
Div I/Div II	School	Year
I/II	Dover Senators	1985
I/II	Dover Senators	1986
I/II	Dover Senators	1988
I/II	Dover Senators	1989
I/II	Caesar Rodney Riders	1990
I/II	Dover Senators	1991
I/II	Dover Senators	1992
I/II	Dover Senators	1993
I/II	Dover Senators	1994
I/II	Dover Senators	1995

Div I/Div II	School	Year
I/II	Dover Senators	1996
I/II	Dover Senators	1997
I/II	Caesar Rodney Riders	1998
I/II	Dover Senators	1999
I/II	Dover Senators	2000
I/II	Dover Senators	2003
I/II	Caesar Rodney Riders	2011
I/II	Caesar Rodney Riders	2012
I/II	Caesar Rodney Riders	2013

=== Indoor Track ===
Div I/Div II	School	Year
I/II	Cape Henlopen Vikings	1984
I/II	Cape Henlopen Vikings	1985
I/II	Seaford Blue Jays	1991
I/II	Cape Henlopen Vikings	1993
I/II	Dover Senators	1995
I/II	Dover Senators	1998
I/II	Dover Senators	2002
I/II	Caesar Rodney Riders	2013
I/II	Dover Senators	2015
I/II	Dover Senators	2019

=== Lacrosse ===
Div I/Div II	School	Year
I/II	Caesar Rodney Riders	1996
I/II	Caesar Rodney Riders	1997
I/II	Cape Henlopen Vikings	1998
I/II	Caesar Rodney Riders	1999
I/II	Cape Henlopen Vikings	2001
I/II	Cape Henlopen Vikings	2002
I/II	Cape Henlopen Vikings	2006
I/II	Cape Henlopen Vikings	2008
I/II	Cape Henlopen Vikings	2014
I/II	Cape Henlopen Vikings	2019

=== Outdoor Track ===
Div I/Div II	School	Year
I	Seaford Blue Jays	1965
I	Dover Senators	1969
I	Cape Henlopen Vikings	1971
I	Cape Henlopen Vikings	1972
I	Cape Henlopen Vikings	1973
I	Cape Henlopen Vikings	1975
I	Dover Senators	1975
II	Cape Henlopen Vikings	1976
I	Dover Senators	1976
I**	Dover Senators	1977

Div I/Div II	School	Year
II**	Seaford Blue Jays	1977
II	Cape Henlopen Vikings	1978
II	Woodbridge Blue Raiders	1979
I	Dover Senators	1980
II	Woodbridge Blue Raiders	1981
II	Woodbridge Blue Raiders	1982
II	Lake Forest Spartans	1984
I	Cape Henlopen Vikings	1986
II	Milford Buccaneers	1986
II	Lake Forest Spartans	1987

Div I/Div II	School	Year
II	Smyrna Eagles	1990
II	Smyrna Eagles	1991
II	Cape Henlopen Vikings	1992
II	Cape Henlopen Vikings	1993
I	Dover Senators	1995
II	Cape Henlopen Vikings	2000
II	Cape Henlopen Vikings	2002
I	Dover Senators	2004
II	Milford Buccaneers	2005
II	Milford Buccaneers	2009

Div I/Div II/Unified	School	Year
II	Milford Buccaneers	2011
I	Caesar Rodney Riders	2013
I	Caesar Rodney Riders	2014
I	Dover Senators	2015
II	Lake Forest Spartans	2015
Unified	Smyrna Eagles	2016
I	Dover Senators	2017
Unified	Caesar Rodney Riders	2017
I	Dover Senators	2018
Unified	Caesar Rodney Riders	2018

- The Middletown Cavaliers won the first outdoor track championship in 1942 as a member of the Diamond State Conference, a precursor to the Henlopen Conference which Middletown is not a part of as they are in New Castle County.
- 1977 was the only year for a Division 1 & 2 North and Division 1 & 2 South for outdoor track.
- The Unified Division was added in 2015 and is a DIAA recognized athletic division partnering students with and without disabilities in conjunction with Special Olympics Delaware.

=== Soccer ===
Div I/Div II	School	Year
I/II	Caesar Rodney Riders	1994
II	Indian River Indians	2013
II	Indian River Indians	2015
II	Indian River Indians	2020
II	Sussex Academy Seahawks	2023
I	Caesar Rodney Riders	2024
II	Sussex Academy Seahawks	2024

- 2013 was the first year that soccer was split into two state championships.

=== Tennis ===
Div I/Div II	School	Year
I/II	Caesar Rodney Riders	2001
I/II	Caesar Rodney Riders	2005
I/II	Caesar Rodney Riders	2011
I/II	Caesar Rodney Riders	2012
I/II	Caesar Rodney Riders	2014
I/II	Caesar Rodney Riders	2015
I/II	Caesar Rodney Riders	2016
I/II	Caesar Rodney Riders	2018

=== Wrestling ===
Div I/Div II	School	Year
I/II	Caesar Rodney Riders	1975
I/II	Caesar Rodney Riders	1978
I/II	Caesar Rodney Riders	1979
I/II	Milford Buccaneers	1980
I/II	Milford Buccaneers	1981
I/II	Caesar Rodney Riders	1982
I/II	Caesar Rodney Riders	1985
II	Smyrna Eagles	1993
II	Smyrna Eagles	1994
II	Smyrna Eagles	1996

Div I/Div II	School	Year
I	Caesar Rodney Riders	2001
I	Caesar Rodney Riders	2003
II	Smyrna Eagles	2003
I	Caesar Rodney Riders	2004
II	Milford Buccaneers	2004
I	Caesar Rodney Riders	2005
II	Smyrna Eagles	2005
I	Caesar Rodney Riders	2006
I	Caesar Rodney Riders	2007
I	Sussex Central Golden Knights	2008

Div I/Div II	School	Year
II	Milford Buccaneers	2009
I	Sussex Central Golden Knights	2010
I	Caesar Rodney Riders	2011
I	Caesar Rodney Riders	2012
II	Polytech Panthers	2012
I	Smyrna Eagles	2013
I	Smyrna Eagles	2014
II	Milford Buccaneers	2014
I	Smyrna Eagles	2015
II	Milford Buccaneers	2015

Div I/Div II	School	Year
I	Smyrna Eagles	2016
II	Milford Buccaneers	2016
I	Sussex Central Golden Knights	2017
II	Milford Buccaneers	2017
I	Caesar Rodney Riders	2018
II	Milford Buccaneers	2018
I	Smyrna Eagles	2019
II	Milford Buccaneers	2019
I	Smyrna Eagles	2020
I	Cape Henlopen Vikings	2021

- 1993 was the first year Wrestling was split into two state championships.

== Total Boys State Championships ==
School	Baseball	Basketball	Cross Country	Football	Golf	Indoor Track	Lacrosse	Outdoor Track	Soccer	Tennis	Wrestling	School Totals
Caesar Rodney	1	1	0	3	5	1	3	4	1	8	14	41
Cape Henlopen	1	2	6	1	0	3	7	11	0	0	1	32
Dover	1	0	0	3	14	5	0	10	0	0	0	33
Lake Forest	0	0	12	1	0	0	0	3	0	0	0	16
Milford	0	1	0	1	0	0	0	4	0	0	10	16
Smyrna	0	1	0	4	0	0	0	3	0	0	11	19
Seaford	4	1	0	2	0	1	0	2	0	0	0	10
Delmar	0	0	0	7	0	0	0	0	0	0	0	7
Indian River	0	2	0	2	0	0	0	0	2	0	0	6
Woodbridge	0	0	1	2	0	0	0	3	0	0	0	6
Sussex Central	1	0	1	2	0	0	0	0	0	0	3	7
Laurel	0	0	0	3	0	0	0	0	0	0	0	3
Polytech	0	0	0	0	0	0	0	0	0	0	1	1
Sussex Tech	0	0	0	1	0	0	0	0	0	0	0	1
Dover Air Force*	0	0	1	0	0	0	0	0	0	0	0	1
Conference Totals	8	8	21	31	19	10	10	40	3	8	39	197

- Dover Air Force Base High School shut down operations in the mid-1980s and students were absorbed into Caesar Rodney .

== Girls State Championships ==
The following Henlopen Conference girl teams have gone on to win state championships (includes pre-merger teams). Of note, if (I/II) appears in the division category, all divisions play for the only state championship. There were no girls championships until the 1973–1974 school year, all championships are post-merger.

=== Basketball ===
Div I/Div II	School	Year
I/II	Cape Henlopen Vikings	1973
I/II	Polytech Panthers	2003

- Cape Henlopen won the first girls basketball championship in 1973.

=== Cross Country ===
Div I/Div II	School	Year
II	Lake Forest Spartans	1990
II	Lake Forest Spartans	1993
II	Cape Henlopen Vikings	1999
II	Seaford Blue Jays	2000
I	Caesar Rodney Riders	2001
I	Caesar Rodney Riders	2002
II	Lake Forest Spartans	2002

=== Field Hockey ===
Div I/Div II	School	Year
I/II	Cape Henlopen Vikings	1979
I/II	Cape Henlopen Vikings	1995
I/II	Milford Buccaneers	1996
I/II	Caesar Rodney Riders	2004
I/II	Sussex Tech Ravens	2009
I/II	Sussex Tech Ravens	2010
I/II	Cape Henlopen Vikings	2011
I/II	Cape Henlopen Vikings	2012
I/II	Cape Henlopen Vikings	2013
I/II	Cape Henlopen Vikings	2014
I/II	Cape Henlopen Vikings	2015
I/II	Delmar Wildcats	2016
I	Cape Henlopen Vikings	2017
II	Delmar Wildcats	2017
I	Cape Henlopen Vikings	2018
II	Delmar Wildcats	2018
I	Cape Henlopen Vikings	2019
II	Delmar Wildcats	2019
I	Cape Henlopen Vikings	2020
II	Delmar Wildcats	2020
I	Cape Henlopen Vikings	2021
II	Delmar Wildcats	2021
I	Smyrna Eagles	2022
II	Delmar Wildcats	2022
I	Cape Henlopen Vikings	2023
II	Delmar Wildcats	2023
I	Cape Henlopen Vikings	2024
II	Delmar Wildcats	2024

- 2017 was the first year of a split between Division 1 and Division 2, with separate state championships

=== Indoor Track ===
Div I/Div II	School	Year
I/II	Dover Senators	1992
I/II	Dover Senators	1993
I/II	Dover Senators	1995
I/II	Dover Senators	2000

=== Lacrosse ===
Div I/Div II	School	Year
I/II	Cape Henlopen Vikings	2009
I/II	Cape Henlopen Vikings	2010
I/II	Cape Henlopen Vikings	2011
I/II	Cape Henlopen Vikings	2012
I/II	Cape Henlopen Vikings	2013
I/II	Cape Henlopen Vikings	2014
I/II	Cape Henlopen Vikings	2015
I/II	Cape Henlopen Vikings	2016
I/II	Cape Henlopen Vikings	2017
I/II	Cape Henlopen Vikings	2018
I/II	Cape Henlopen Vikings	2019
I/II	Cape Henlopen Vikings	2021
I/II	Cape Henlopen Vikings	2022
I/II	Cape Henlopen Vikings	2024
I/II	Cape Henlopen Vikings	2025

- Cape Henlopen's win for lacrosse in 2009 was the first time a public high school had won the girls lacrosse state championship ever in Delaware, which started in 1998.
- There were no spring championships played in Delaware in 2020 due to the COVID-19 pandemic, Cape Henlopen's 13-consecutive state championships from 2009 to 2022 is the longest streak for any Henlopen Conference school in any sport.

=== Outdoor Track ===
Div I/Div II	School	Year
I/II	Dover Senators	1973
I South	Caesar Rodney Riders	1977
I	Caesar Rodney Riders	1978
I	Caesar Rodney Riders	1979
I	Caesar Rodney Riders	1980
II	Lake Forest Spartans	1983
II	Seaford Blue Jays	1984
II	Seaford Blue Jays	1985
II	Seaford Blue Jays	1986
I	Dover Senators	1993
I	Dover Senators	1994
I	Dover Senators	1998
I	Dover Senators	1999
I	Dover Senators	2000
I	Caesar Rodney Riders	2001
II	Lake Forest Spartans	2001
I	Caesar Rodney Riders	2002
II	Cape Henlopen Vikings	2002
II	Cape Henlopen Vikings	2003
II	Cape Henlopen Vikings	2004
II	Cape Henlopen Vikings	2005
II	Milford Buccaneers	2006
I	Cape Henlopen Vikings	2011
I	Cape Henlopen Vikings	2012
I	Smyrna Eagles	2013

- Dover won the first outdoor track championship in 1973.
- 1977 was the only year for a Division 1 North and Division 1 South outdoor track championship.

=== Tennis ===
Div I/Div II	School	Year
I/II	Seaford Blue Jays	1991
I/II	Cape Henlopen Vikings	1991
I/II	Seaford Blue Jays	1992
I/II	Milford Buccaneers	1997
I/II	Cape Henlopen Vikings	2011
I/II	Caesar Rodney Riders	2016

=== Softball ===
Div I/Div II	School	Year
I/II	Milford Buccaneers	1976
I/II	Lake Forest Spartans	1979
I/II	Smyrna Eagles	1993
I/II	Sussex Central Golden Knights	1995
I/II	Indian River Indians	1998
I/II	Caesar Rodney Riders	2003
I/II	Sussex Central Golden Knights	2005
I/II	Sussex Tech Ravens	2007
I/II	Sussex Central Golden Knights	2008
I/II	Milford Buccaneers	2009
I/II	Sussex Tech Ravens	2012
I/II	Laurel Bulldogs	2013
I/II	Laurel Bulldogs	2014
I/II	Polytech Panthers	2015
I/II	Milford Buccaneers	2017
I/II	Smyrna Eagles	2018
I/II	Smyrna Eagles	2019

- Milford won the inaugural softball championship in 1976.

=== Volleyball ===
Div I/Div II	School	Year
I/II	Smyrna Eagles	2023

== Total Girls State Championships ==
School	Basketball	Cross Country	Field Hockey	Indoor Track	Lacrosse	Outdoor Track	Tennis	Softball	School Totals
Caesar Rodney	0	2	1	0	0	6	1	1	11
Cape Henlopen	1	1	11	0	8	6	2	0	29
Dover	0	0	0	4	0	6	0	0	10
Lake Forest	0	3	0	0	0	2	0	1	6
Milford	0	0	1	0	0	1	1	2	5
Seaford	0	1	0	0	0	3	2	0	6
Smyrna	0	0	0	0	0	1	0	1	2
Delmar	0	0	5	0	0	0	0	0	5
Indian River	0	0	0	0	0	0	0	1	1
Woodbridge	0	0	0	0	0	0	0	0	0
Laurel	0	0	0	0	0	0	0	2	2
Sussex Central	0	0	0	0	0	0	0	3	3
Polytech	1	0	0	0	0	0	0	1	2
Sussex Tech	0	0	2	0	0	0	0	2	4
Conference Totals	2	7	12	4	8	25	6	14	78

== Overall state championships ==
The total number of state championships won by Henlopen Conference teams in both boys and girls sports, in order of championships won:

Cape Henlopen Vikings – 54
Caesar Rodney Riders – 48
Dover Senators – 37
Lake Forest Spartans – 22
Milford Buccaneers – 21
Seaford Blue Jays – 16
Smyrna Eagles – 15
Sussex Central Golden Knights – 10
Delmar Wildcats – 7
Indian River Indians – 7
Woodbridge Blue Raiders – 6
Laurel Bulldogs – 5
Sussex Tech Ravens – 5
Polytech Panthers – 3
Dover Air Force Base (defunct) – 1

== Notable sports alumni ==
- Walter "Huck" Betts of Millsboro was a pitcher for the Philadelphia Phillies and Boston Braves in the 1920s and 1930s, in the pre-draft years.
- Caleb "Tex" Warrington of Dover (Dover Senators) played center and guard for the Brooklyn Dodgers football team of the All-America Football Conference (the precursor to today's American Football Conference in the National Football League) from 1946 to 1948 out of Auburn University.
- Carl Elliott of Laurel (Laurel Bulldogs) played defensive end and wide receiver for the Green Bay Packers from 1951 to 1954 out of the University of Virginia.
- Forest "Spook" Jacobs of Milford was a second baseman for the Philadelphia Athletics, Kansas City Athletics, and Pittsburgh Pirates from 1954 to 1956, is one of only two players in Major League Baseball history to go 4 for 4 in his first major league game (the other being Delino DeShields of Seaford, Delaware), and is a 1991 inductee to the Delaware Sports Museum and Hall of Fame.
- Chris Short of Milford (Milford Buccaneers) was a pitcher for the Philadelphia Phillies and Milwaukee Brewers from 1959 to 1973, beginning in the pre-draft years.
- Carl Ergenzinger of Dover (Dover Senators) was drafted as a catcher and third baseman in the ninth round for the Houston Astros in 1965, the first year of the formal Major League Baseball draft.
- Danny LeBright of Milford (Milford Buccaneers) was a pitcher for the Houston Astros, making the team in a 1967 tryout.
- Thomas Sullivan of Dover (Dover Senators) was drafted as a pitcher in the eleventh round by the Cleveland Indians in 1969.
- Randy Lee of Laurel (Laurel Bulldogs) was drafted as a pitcher in the 15th round by the Baltimore Orioles in 1970.
- Renie Martin of Dover (Dover Senators) was drafted as pitcher in the 9th round by the San Francisco Giants in 1976 out of the University of Richmond.
- Ralph Jean of Dover (Dover Senators) was a pitcher drafted by the Oakland Athletics in the 33rd round of the 1978 draft.
- Randy Bush of Dover (Dover Senators) was drafted as an outfielder by the Minnesota Twins in the 2nd round in 1979 out of the University of New Orleans.
- Robert Nichols of Delmar (Delmar Wildcats) was drafted as a pitcher by the Pittsburgh Pirates in the 14th round of the 1980 draft.
- Julie Dayton of Laurel (Laurel Bulldogs) was first team All-American in lacrosse in 1980 and 1981 out of Longwood College, was a ten-year member of Team USA from 1980 to 1990, was the head field hockey coach for University of Virginia and Dartmouth College, and is a 2003 inductee into the Delaware Sports Museum and Hall of Fame.
- Oliver Maull of Lewes (Cape Henlopen Vikings) was drafted as a catcher by the Baltimore Orioles in the 26th round of the 1981 draft.
- Mike Meade of Dover (Dover Senators) played fullback for the Green Bay Packers and Detroit Lions from 1982 to 1985 out of Pennsylvania State University.
- Bob Vantrease of Seaford (Seaford Blue Jays) was drafted as a pitcher by the Oakland Athletics in the 29th round of the 1983 draft out of the University of Delaware.
- Doug Willey of Bridgeville (Woodbridge Blue Raiders) was drafted as a pitcher by the Atlanta Braves in the 15th round of the 1985 draft out of Essex Community College.
- Warren McGee of Seaford (Seaford Blue Jays) was signed by the Philadelphia Phillies as a pitcher after the 1986 draft.
- Delino DeShields of Seaford (Seaford Blue Jays) was drafted as a second baseman by the Montreal Expos as the 12th overall pick in the 1st round in 1987 out of Villanova University and is one of only two players in Major League Baseball history to collect four hits in their major league debut (the other was Milford's Spook Jacobs), had career totals of 1548 hits, 872 runs scored, 561 RBIs, and 463 stolen bases. He was named the Baltimore Orioles Most Valuable Player in 2000 and is a 2006 inductee into the Delaware Sports Museum and Hall of Fame.
- Clarence Bailey of Milford (Milford Buccaneers) played as a fullback for the Miami Dolphins in 1987 out of Hampton University.
- Pat Wright of Camden (Caesar Rodney Riders) was drafted as a catcher by the Oakland Athletics in the 32nd round of the 1988 draft.
- Michael Neill of Seaford (Seaford Blue Jays) was drafted as an outfielder by the Oakland Athletics in the 2nd round of the 1991 draft out of Villanova University, won an Olympic gold medal with the United States Olympic Baseball team, won 5 state championships in Little League, advanced three times to the Little League World Series, 1991 Big East Player of the Year, and is a 2005 inductee to the Delaware Sports Museum and Hall of Fame.
- Stoney Briggs of Seaford (Seaford Blue Jays) was drafted as an outfielder by the Toronto Blue Jays in the 8th round of the 1991 draft out of Delaware Technical & Community College.
- Mark Harris of Camden (Caesar Rodney Riders) was drafted as a shortstop by the Chicago White Sox in the 17th round of the 1991 draft.
- Ben Cephas of Seaford (Seaford Blue Jays) was drafted as an outfielder by the Milwaukee Brewers in the 27th round of the 1992 draft out of Delaware Technical & Community College.
- Frank Roberts of Seaford (Seaford Blue Jays) was drafted as a pitcher by the Florida Marlins in their inaugural draft in 1993 in the 72nd round (the draft was extended for the expansion teams).
- Brad Lee of Lewes (Cape Henlopen Vikings) was drafted as an outfielder by the Texas Rangers in the supplemental draft in 1994 out of Delaware Technical & Community College.
- Brian Miflin of Lewes (Cape Henlopen Vikings) was drafted as an outfielder by the New York Mets in the 50th round of the 1994 draft out of Delaware Technical & Community College.
- Mike Riley of Seaford (Seaford Blue Jays) was drafted as a pitcher by the San Francisco Giants in the 16th round of the 1996 draft out of West Virginia University.
- Lovett Purnell of Seaford (Seaford Blue Jays) was drafted as a tight end and wide receiver by the New England Patriots in the 7th round of the 1996 draft and played for the Baltimore Ravens as well, was drafted by the Chicago White Sox, was captain of the West Virginia University football team and named to the WVU All-Century Team, named All-Big East, and played in Super Bowl XXXI, and was a 2007 inductee into the Delaware Sports Museum Hall of Fame.
- Erik McLaughlin (Polytech Panthers) was signed by the Atlanta Braves after a try-out in 1996.
- Rob Meyers of Felton (Lake Forest Spartans) was signed by the Minnesota Twins after a try-out in 1997.
- Dave Williams of Camden (Caesar Rodney Riders) was drafted as a pitcher by the Pittsburgh Pirates in 1998.
- Luke Petitgout of Georgetown (Sussex Central Golden Knights) was drafted as an offensive lineman by the New York Giants as the 19th overall pick of the 1999 draft out of the University of Notre Dame.
- Ian Snell (aka Ian Oquendo) of Dover (Caesar Rodney Riders) was drafted as a pitcher by the Pittsburgh Pirates in the 26th round in the 2000 draft.
- Mark Comoli of Millsboro (Indian River Indians) was drafted as a pitcher by the Toronto Blue Jays in the 25th round of the 2001 draft out of Delaware Technical & Community College.
- Isiah Wright of Dover (Dover Senators) was drafted as a pitcher by the Montreal Expos in the 15th round of the 2002 draft.
- Shawn Phillips of Laurel (Laurel Bulldogs) was drafted as a pitcher by Texas Rangers in the 2004 draft out of Delaware State University.
- Derrick Gibson of Seaford (Seaford Blue Jays) was drafted as a shortstop and pitcher by the Boston Red Sox in the 2nd round of the 2008 draft.
- Theodis Bowe of Ellendale (Milford Buccaneers) was drafted as a center fielder by the Cincinnati Reds in the 21st round of the 2008 draft.
- Jerell Allen of Milford (Milford Buccaneers) was drafted as a center fielder by the Kansas City Royals in the 11th round of the 2011 MLB draft.
- Devon Reed of Milford (Milford Buccaneers) was drafted as a shortstop by the Florida Marlins in the 20th round of the 2011 MLB draft.
- Nicholas Grant of Milford (Milford Buccaneers) was drafted as a pitcher by the New York Mets in the 15th round of the 2012 MLB draft.
- Professional wrestlers Jamin and Mark Pugh, The Briscoe Brothers, of Laurel (Laurel Bulldogs) received honorable mention all-state for football in both their junior and senior years of high school.
- Carrie Lingo of Rehoboth Beach (Cape Henlopen Vikings) played field hockey for University of North Carolina Tar Heels where she was a two-time All-ACC honoree, won a National Championship in 1997, was a national runner-up in 2000, and was named to the ACC 50th Anniversary Team as one of the top field hockey players in conference history. After college, she represented the United States in the Pan American Cup, Pan American Games, World Cup, Olympic qualifier and the Beijing Olympics. She was elected to the Delaware Sports Hall of Fame in 2015.
- Zack Gelof of Rehoboth Beach (Cape Henlopen Vikings) played baseball for the University of Virginia Cavaliers when he was drafted as a second baseman by Oakland Athletics in the 2nd round of the 2021 MLB draft.
