= Polytech High School =

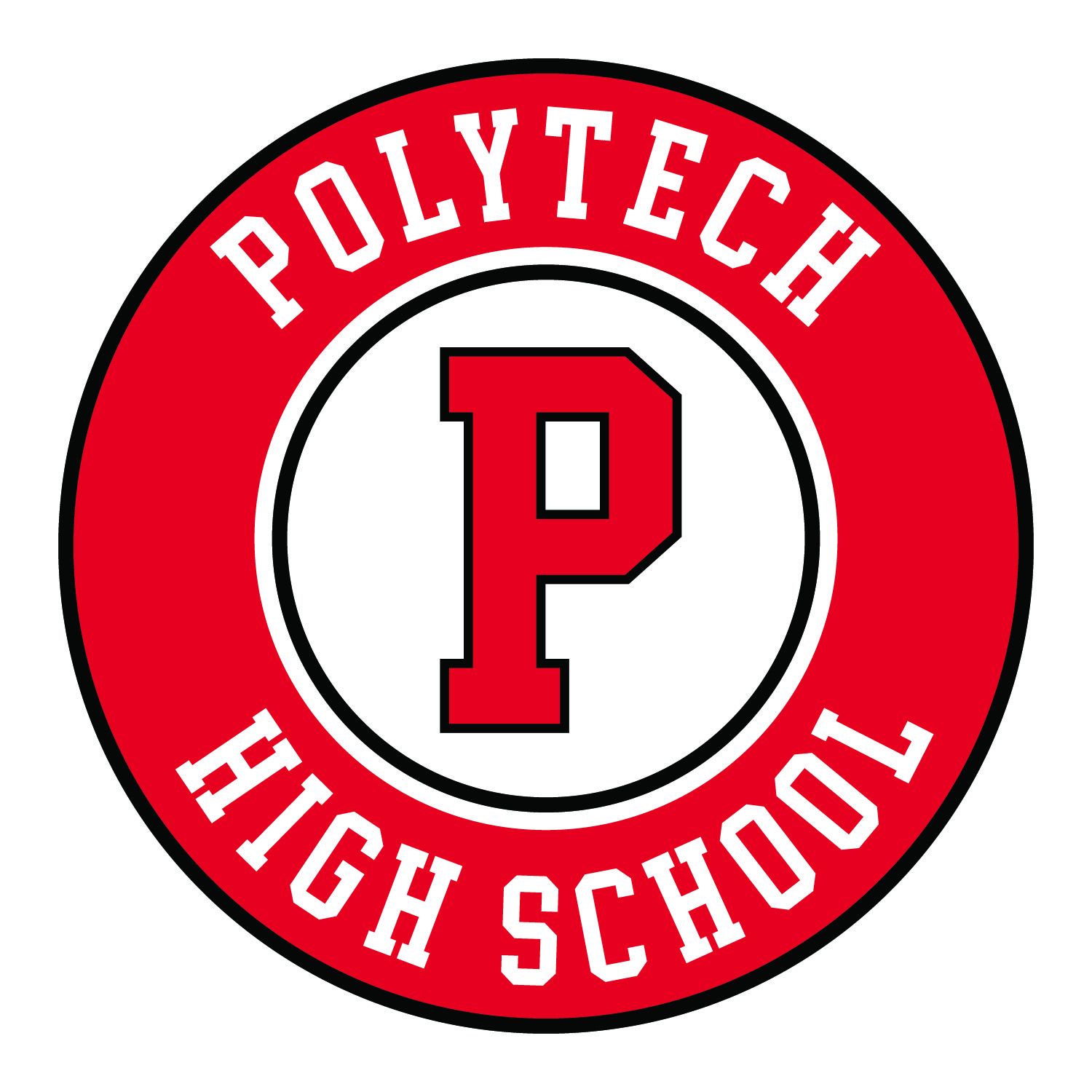

Location
- 823 Walnut Shade Road; Woodside, Delaware 19980; United States; 39°04′19″N 75°32′46″W

Information
- Type: Public secondary
- School district: Polytech School District
- CEEB code: 080221
- Principal: George Fisher
- Teaching staff: 91.00 (FTE)
- Grades: 9-12
- Enrollment: 1,225 (2023-2024)
- Student to teacher ratio: 13.46
- Colors: Red and black
- Athletics conference: Henlopen Conference - Northern Division
- Mascot: Panther
- Website: www.polytechpanthers.com

Polytech High School is located in Woodside, Delaware. It was a vocational school starting in the 1960s and changed to a full-time high school in 1991. Polytech admits students from Kent County through a lottery system. At Polytech 9th grade students go through a shop rotation, choosing a shop to major in during their high school years.

== Academies and shops ==
Industrial	Professional Services	Health & Medical Services	Modern Technology
Building Construction	Education Professions	Healthcare & Rehabilitation	Criminal Justice
Electrical Construction	Cosmetology	Dental Assisting	Computer Engineering Technology
Auto Body	Culinary Arts	Medical Assisting	HVAC
Masonry	Environmental Science	Patient Care Services	Broadcast Media
Welding			Engineering Design Technology
Auto Tech			

== Notable alumni ==
- Kendall Gray, basketball player
- Tyresa Smith, basketball player
