= Polytech School District =

School district in Delaware, United States

Polytech School District is a public school district in Kent County, Delaware, United States. It includes Polytech High School and the Polytech adult education program.
