= Thompsonville, Delaware =

Unincorporated community in Delaware, United States

- Unincorporated community
- Location within Delaware Location within the United States
- Coordinates: 38°59′58″N 75°23′23″W
- Country: United States
- State: Delaware
- County: Kent
- Elevation: 10 ft (3.0 m)
- Time zone: UTC-5 (Eastern (EST))
  - Summer (DST): UTC-4 (EDT)
- Area code: 302
- GNIS feature ID: 216234

Thompsonville is an unincorporated community in Kent County, Delaware, United States. Thompsonville is located at the intersection of Milford Neck Road and Bennetts Pier Road, northeast of Milford.

== History ==
The Thompsonville Methodist Church was established in 1790. A post office was established in Thompsonville in July, 1891 and operated in the Thompson Store until the last mail day of March, 1902, when rural free delivery was started for the area. The South Bowers Volunteer Fire Company established a fire station in Thompsonville in 1970, and eventually closed the fire station in South Bowers and moved all operations to the station in Thompsonville.
