= Delmar School District =

School district in Delmar, Delaware, U.S.

Delmar School District is a school district headquartered in Delmar, Delaware.

In 2009 the district had over 11 administrators.

In 2015 David Ring, the previous superintendent, left for Baltimore due to proximity with family, and Charity Phillips became the new superintendent.

== History ==
The Delaware General Assembly had, before 1919, incorporated Delmar School District 163 and Delmar School District 163 ½. Delmar School District 212 ½ merged into Delmar 163 on February 9, 1965. The combined district was reorganized as the Delmar School District on July 1, 1969.

== Schools ==
The district operates secondary schools only, both in one building.

- Delmar High School
- Delmar Middle School

The previous facility for the two schools had about 93,000 square feet (8,600 m^{2}) of space.

The current facilities opened in 2000. With a cost of $19 million it had about 143,000 square feet (13,300 m^{2}) of space. The funds to build the middle and high school were to come from the Delaware state government.

Students attend Delmar Elementary School in Delmar, Maryland as per an agreement with the Wicomico County Public Schools. Prior to 2000 6th graders went to Maryland.
