= Sussex Central High School (Delaware) =

High school in Delaware, U.S.

Coordinates: 38°37′49″N 75°19′34″W

Location
- 26026 Patriots Way; Georgetown, (Sussex County), Delaware 19947; United States

Information
- Type: Public high school
- Principal: David Carter
- Staff: 140.00 (FTE)
- Enrollment: 2,012 (2023-24)
- Student to teacher ratio: 14.37
- Colors: Royal blue and gold
- Mascot: Goldie the Golden Knight
- Nickname: Golden Knights
- Website: Sussex Central High School

Sussex Central High School is a senior high school in unincorporated Sussex County, Delaware, near Georgetown. It is a part of the Indian River School District (IRSD). It is also connected to the all new Sussex Central Middle School.

== Notable alumni ==
- Brian Hollamon, baseball coach
- Valerie Jones Giltner, politician and state house representative
- Brian G. Pettyjohn, state senator
