= Milford School District =

School district in Milford, Delaware, United States

Milford School District is the school district of Milford, Delaware, United States.

It includes areas in Kent County and Sussex County, including all of Milford, Ellendale, Houston, Lincoln, Slaughter Beach, and a portion of Frederica.

== Schools ==
High school:

- Milford High School

Middle Schools:

- Milford Central Academy (7th-8th)
- Milford Middle School (5th-6th)

Primary Schools:

- Banneker (Benjamin) Elementary School (PRE-K - 1st)
- Mispillion Elementary School (2nd - 4th)
- Ross (Lulu M.) Elementary School (2nd - 4th)
- Morris (Evelyn l.) Early Childhood Center (PRE-K - 1st)

== Milford High School ==
Milford High School
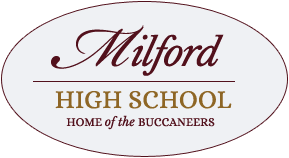

Location
- 1019 North Walnut Street; Milford, Delaware 19963; United States
- Coordinates: 38°55′58″N 75°23′13″W

Information
- School district: Milford School District
- Principal: Seth Buford
- Grades: 9-12
- Enrollment: 1,054 (2017-18)
- Colors: Maroon & Gold
- Athletics conference: Henlopen Conference - North Division
- Mascot: Buccaneers
- Website: mhs.milfordschooldistrict.org

Milford High School is a public high school serving grades 9–12 in Milford, Delaware. The high school serves students in the Milford School District. Milford High School had an enrollment of 1,054 students as of the 2017–18 school year.

In 2000 Milford High had expansion work.
