= Sussex Technical High School =

Location
- 17099 County Seat Highway; Georgetown, Delaware 19947; United States; 38°38′37″N 75°26′35″W

Information
- Type: Public secondary
- Motto: Preparing Technical Students for Their Future
- Established: 1961 (65 years ago)
- School district: Sussex County Vocational Technical School District
- CEEB code: 080052
- Chairman: Dr. Kevin E. Carson
- Principal: John Baugher
- Grades: 9-12
- Enrollment: 1,323 (2023-24)
- Colors: Silver and black
- Athletics conference: Henlopen Conference - Northern Division
- Mascot: Raven
- Yearbook: Evermore
- Website: www.sussexvt.org

Sussex Technical High School is a public high school in Georgetown, Delaware. Its enrollment at last count was roughly 1,323 students. As a choice school, each year over 800 eighth-grade students in Sussex County apply for 350 openings. The mascot for the school is a raven.

Also known as Sussex Tech, the school was one of two Delaware high schools recognized by the U.S. Department of Education as a Blue Ribbon School in 2008 for academic achievement. It was previously selected by the Department of Education in 1996 as one of ten showcase site schools, receiving the New American High Schools award for high levels of success.

The school is operated by Sussex County Vocational Technical School District, an overlay district serving all of Sussex County.

== History ==
Built in 1961, Sussex Tech started as the Sussex Vocational-Technical High School providing career training to Sussex County students to help them enter the workforce after graduation. Students would spend half the day at their district school, then spend the rest of the day at Sussex Tech learning a trade.

Sussex Tech became a full-time high school in 1991, offering a comprehensive program of academic courses as well as technical education. With additions, the school grew to a total of 82 classrooms. Sussex Tech currently offers 19 technical fields of study. Sussex Tech Adult Education offers classes, apprenticeships, English as Second Language, and GED classes.

More students were accepted into the school in the 2012–2013 school year, making it one of Sussex Tech's most historical years. Also, Sussex Tech's Raven Nation Marching Band was featured in Chicago's McDonald's Thanksgiving Parade in 2012.

=== School library ===
With its full-time conversion in 1991, Sussex Tech also opened its own library and hired a librarian. This project started in a small storage room with a desk, chair, one computer and no books. It quickly filled to capacity.

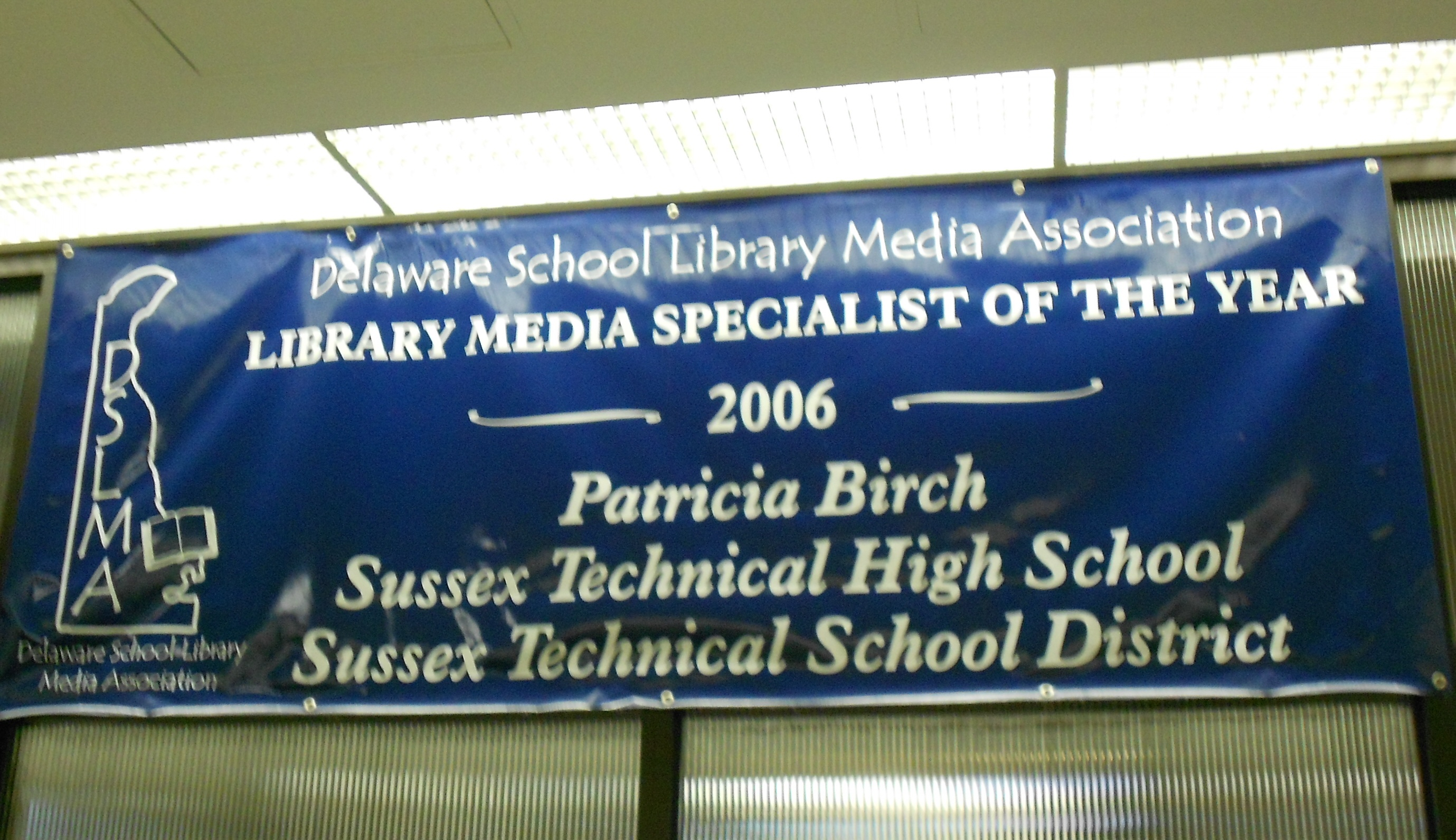
Award banner, received from the Delaware School Library Media Association in 2006 by Sussex Tech's librarian, Patricia Woods (aka Patricia Birch)

In 2000, the school opened its current library, known as the Benjamin Franklin Information Center. The new library emphasized the school's technical focus, relying on computer workstations for access to resources in external networks. Sussex Tech's library led the state of Delaware by 2007, with 75 computers available for its students.

During 2007, the school library also became the first to implement Delaware's Statewide Library Catalog and Schoolrooms system, an interface allowing students to reserve and request books from any library in the state, and also providing online access to magazines and newspapers. Books requested from other locations through the statewide system are delivered to the school's library.

== Student body and staff ==
In 2024 Sussex Technical High School has 1323 students. Sussex Tech Adult Education has over 3,500 students.

The District employs 10 administrators.

== Scandals ==
=== Financial ===
From 2012 through 2017, Sussex Tech suffered a series of financial scandals.

In October 2013, a nutrition supervisor for the school worked with federal and state auditors to resolve a discrepancy in the school's food budget. Auditors found that $8,000 were missing from the account, and the nutrition supervisor informed them that the school's principal purchased televisions and audio equipment for the cafeteria. The supervisor contended that this was not a valid purchase of the food funding. Subsequently, he was terminated from his position and filed a whistleblower lawsuit alleging wrongful termination. The case has not yet gone to trial.

In 2015, a teacher in the school's adult division was terminated after reporting illegal conduct to the adult division's principal. The teacher alleged that the school was mass-producing copyrighted text books and other materials without the consent of the publishers. The estimated lost profits exceeded $500,000. After reporting the misconduct to the school, he was terminated. The case was settled in January 2017 for $95,000.

In 2017, a state auditor's report found financial mismanagement at Sussex Tech. The audit report focused on an event from 2012. In 2012, a businessman purchased land for $110,000, and then two weeks later sold it to Sussex Tech for $200,000. A few months later, the same businessman was awarded the contract to redevelop the same parcel and construct a new bus entrance for the school. The report found that the businessman and/or his company received over $3.8 million from 2011 through 2016 without ever bidding on any additional projects. In June 2017, during the investigation, senior officials at the high school were placed on paid leave.

=== Student suicide ===
In 2013, a sophomore student committed suicide in the cafeteria bathroom.

== Athletics ==
Sussex Technical High School's athletic teams participate in the Henlopen Conference.

== New High School ==
In 2019 the Sussex County Vocational Technical School District Board of Education voted to construct a new high school. The original building was constructed in 1960 with additions and renovations taking place in 1964, 1970, 1995, 2000, and 2008. The option to construct a new building was one of three options outlined following a five-month feasibility study.

In October 2019, Sussex Tech’s request for a certificate of necessity was denied by the Delaware Department of Education.

Sussex Tech continued to pursue a new building and in November 2021 received a verbal commitment from the Delaware Department of Education to build a new $177 million school.

In February 2022 the district announced plans for moving forward to build a new high school on the site of its current location.

In June 2023 plans for the new school were released to the public. The new high school building is scheduled to open September 2027.
