= Dim Montero =

American football coach (1918–1980)

- Montero at Salesianum

Biographical details
- Born: January 13, 1918; Camden, New Jersey, U.S.
- Died: December 11, 1980 (aged 62); Silver Spring, Maryland, U.S.

Playing career

Football
- 1938: Pennsylvania Military
- 1939–1941: La Salle
- 1939: Scholastic All-Stars
- 1941–1942: Stony Field
- 1942: Eastern All-Army

Basketball
- 1938–1939: Pennsylvania Military
- Position(s): Tackle, guard (football)

Coaching career (HC unless noted)

Football
- 1939: Scholastic All-Stars
- 1941–1942: Stony Field
- 1945: Pacific (assistant)
- 1945: Salesianum School (assistant)
- 1946–1948: St. James HS (L)
- 1948: Lamokin Athletic Club
- 1949–1950: Washington College
- 1951: King's
- 1954: VMI (L)
- 1954–1955: Salesianum School (assistant)
- 1956–1965: Salesianum School
- 1967: Maryland (assistant/freshman HC)
- 1968–1972: Maryland (assistant)

Track and field
- 1955–?: Salesianum School (co-coach)

Administrative career (AD unless noted)
- 1967: Maryland (AA)
- 1968: Maryland (AA/AAC)
- 1969–1972: Maryland (AAD/RC)

Accomplishments and honors

Awards
- Delaware Coach of the Year (1957); National Catholic Coach of the Year (1964); National Foundation Coach of the Year (1964); Delaware Sports Museum and Hall of Fame (1978)

Dominic "Dim" Montero (January 13, 1918 – December 11, 1980) was an American football coach. After attending Salesianum School in Wilmington, Delaware, Montero played college football for the Pennsylvania Military Cadets and La Salle Explorers before serving in World War II and playing with military service teams; he was a selection to the Little All-America team.

After his time in the military, Montero had coaching stints as an assistant with the Pacific Tigers (1945), at Salesianum (1945) and St. James High School for Boys (1946–1948). He then served as the head coach for the Washington College Shoremen (1949–1950) and King's Monarchs (1951) before resigning. After a brief stint with the VMI Keydets, Montero returned to Salesianum and served as head football coach from 1956 to 1965, being highly decorated while leading the team to several undefeated seasons. He coached as an assistant for the Maryland Terrapins from 1967 to 1972 before retiring.

== Early life and playing career ==
Montero was born on January 13, 1918, in Camden, New Jersey. He attended Salesianum School in Wilmington, Delaware, where he was a standout athlete. He made the varsity football team as a 15-year-old freshman in 1934, helping the team tie for the Philadelphia Catholic League title that year against a school with an enrollment more than ten times the size of Salesianum's.

A tackle, Montero started all four seasons at the school and was a first-team all-league selection in his final three. He helped Salesianum be named the city champions in 1936 and served as team captain that year, then being co-team captain as a senior the next year. In addition to his success as a football player, Montero also won the Philadelphia Catholic League shot put championship three times straight, including defeating Bucko Kilroy in 1937 and Frank Reagan in 1938. His throw at the 1938 championship was a league record.

Montero received several athletic scholarship offers, with one newspaper noting that he was one of "the greatest tackles ever turned out in the Philadelphia Catholic League". He enrolled at Pennsylvania Military College and immediately became a starter for the P. M. C. Cadets football team at left tackle. He also played basketball at the school, but announced that he was leaving in January 1939.

In August 1939, it was announced that Montero had signed a deal whereby he would join the professional Wilmington Clippers if he did not find a college to attend; however, he ultimately entered La Salle University and played for their Explorers football team that year under coach Marty Brill. At the end of the year, he played for and served as head coach of the Scholastic All-Star exhibition team that played against the Wilmington Tonies, the city's semi-professional champion.

Montero returned to La Salle in 1940 and was a starter at tackle, being one of the "stars" of the team. He remained a starter in 1941 and was elected the co-team captain for the 1942 season. He reportedly was a selection to the Little All-America team and had an offer to play in the National Football League (NFL) for the New York Giants, before he was called to serve in World War II.

Montero was stationed at Stony Field in South Carolina from 1941 to 1942, being a player for its military service football team and also its coach. He was also a member of the Eastern All-Army football team, playing at guard. He was called to serve overseas in 1943, being a member of the 26th Infantry Division under the command of general George S. Patton. On October 21, 1944, his division fought a battle against the Germans in Metz, France, which saw only eight of 125 members not killed or wounded. He was wounded but continued fighting the next day and was wounded worse; Tony Rendina, who played football against Montero and was also a part of the division, later said that, "How [Montero] survived, I'll never know." Montero had shrapnel in his back, stomach, shoulder, and by his eye, and spent a full year in hospitals recovering.

== Coaching career ==
Montero began his coaching career with the Scholastic All-Stars, for which he played, in 1939, and then was player-coach of the Stony Field team from 1941 to 1942. While he was recovering from his wounds from battle, Montero assisted in coaching the line for the Pacific Tigers under Amos Alonzo Stagg in early 1945. When he was released from the hospital in September 1945, he spent some time as an assistant at Salesianum.

In 1946, Montero was named the line coach at St. James High School for Boys in Chester, Pennsylvania. While with them in 1948, he also was the head coach of the semi-professional Lamokin Athletic Club. In three years at St. James, he helped the school to two undefeated seasons while only allowing seven points to be scored against them. In 1949, he was appointed head coach of the Washington College Shoremen. In his first year, he led the team to a record of 3–2–2 despite only having one senior player; Montero was considered one of the top coaching prospects and received multiple other head coach offers after the season, although he stayed at Washington.

Montero left Washington after his second season to become the new head coach of the King's Monarchs. However, after only one year at King's, he resigned to become an engineer at DuPont. He returned to coaching in 1954, being named the line coach of the VMI Keydets. However, he resigned before the season started to become a teacher and assistant football coach at Salesianum. He also added the role of co-track coach in 1955. Among athletes he coached on the track team was Vic Zwolak, who went on to be a competitor at the Summer Olympic Games.

Montero was promoted to head football coach in 1956. He ultimately served in the position for 10 seasons (1956–1965) and led the school to great successes. Considered one of the greatest coaches in state history, he compiled an overall record of 70–10–3 at Salesianum and led the team to four undefeated seasons, which included a state-record winning streak of 29 games as well as one of 26 games. He never had a team that lost more than two games. He was named the Delaware Coach of the Year in 1957 and was the National Catholic Coach of the Year as well as the National Foundation Coach of the Year in 1964. In Montero's tenure at Salesianum, he helped 46 players earn all-state honors, while having 63 who earned athletic scholarship offers and 20 who were named All-Americans. He announced his resignation in February 1966.

In 1967, after a year out of football, Montero was hired by the Maryland Terrapins in the position of administrative assistant and assistant football coach. He also served as coach of the freshman team, a role he dropped in 1968 to be a full-time varsity coach and administrative aide to the coach. He received a promotion in 1969 to assistant to the athletic director and recruiting coordinator, also receiving a position overseeing the academics of athletes. He was considered to be a very talented recruiter, with one team staff member saying that Montero could "pick up a rock and find an outstanding football prospect." A notable athlete he recruited was Randy White, who went on to be a Pro Football Hall of Fame player with the Dallas Cowboys. When Maryland reached the 1973 Peach Bowl, 50-of-62 of their players had been recruited by Montero. He announced his retirement in April 1973 at the suggestion of his physician, as he had suffered a stroke the previous December.

In his coaching career at the college, high school and military levels, Montero's overall record as a head coach was 136–22–4, a winning percentage of 85.2. He was considered "among the most popular sports figures" in Delaware and was inducted into the Delaware Sports Museum and Hall of Fame in 1978, his first appearance on the ballot. The "Dim Montero Award" was named in his honor, which was given to the best senior football player in Delaware. He was also inducted into the Salesianum School Hall of Fame in 2004, as part of its second class. Montero was ranked first on The News Journal's 2007 list of the 25 greatest high school football coaches in Delaware, compiled by Jack Ireland, (Note: Ireland based his list on coaches whom he had observed, noting that he thus did not rank older coaches such as George Schollenberger, Bobby Dowd and Millard Naylor.) and ranked 25th on the newspaper's 2023 list of the "125 Greatest Coaches in Delaware History", compiled by Kevin Tresolini. A statue of Montero was built at the entrance of Salesianum's football field, Abessinio Stadium.

== Personal life and death ==
Montero was married and had three children. He died on December 11, 1980, at the age of 62, in Silver Spring, Maryland, from a heart attack.
