= Rosemary Miller =

American sport shooter (1939–1974)

Personal information
- Born: June 26, 1939 Wilmington, Delaware, U.S.
- Died: December 3, 1974 (aged 35) Wilmington, Delaware, U.S.
- Years active: 1962–1974
- Height: 5 ft 6 in (168 cm)
- Weight: 123 lb (56 kg)

Sport
- Sport: Shooting
- Event(s): Trap, skeet

Rosemary Young Miller (June 26, 1939 – December 3, 1974) was an American sport shooter. A prominent trap and skeet shooter, she was inducted into the Delaware Trapshooting Hall of Fame in 1979, the Delaware Sports Museum and Hall of Fame in 1983, and the Skeetshooting Hall of Fame in 2002. She was a three-time first-team All-American as selected by Sports Afield magazine and ranked as high as the second-best woman trap shooter in the U.S.

== Early life ==
Miller was born on June 26, 1939, in Wilmington, Delaware. She was a lifelong resident of the area. She was married to John Miller and had two children with him: Bob and John Jr. During the 1950s, the Miller family occasionally practiced target shooting with pistols and rifles. In 1960, her husband quit his job with a telephone company and decided to start up a business, Miller's Gun Center.

== Career ==
As the co-owner of the gun center, Miller decided to try out target shooting with shotguns. She began with skeet shooting in 1961, and entered the state championship in 1962, which she won. She repeated in 1963 and 1964 before deciding to skip the 1965 tournament. Miller began trap shooting in 1965 and won the state championship in 1966, winning every state trap shooting championship except one (1973) through 1974. In The Great Delaware Sports Book, Doug Gelbert wrote of Miller and shotguns: "There hadn't been a more natural pairing in Delaware since Caesar Rodney climbed on top of a horse." Matt Zabitka called her "Delaware's version of Annie Oakley" and said that she was "a natural. She has the clout of a Richie Allen in baseball. She's a potential 'home-run hitter' every time she squeezes the trigger."

Miller became a nationally prominent trap shooter, winning a number of titles, both state- and nation-wide, and performing well against men in competition as well. She competed at the Grand American Trapshoot, described as the "Super Bowl of trapshooting," and won several world championships, being called a "fixture" of the event. She won three medals at the Grand American Trapshoot in 1967. In 1968, after initially not planning to go, she decided to return to the event as state champion and had several top performances. On the first day of the event, she placed third in the "Champion of Champions" tournament, for the state winners, with a score of 196 × 200. (Note: Hitting 196 of 200 targets.) She then was first in the Class B of the Class tournament with a score of 196 × 200 the next day, and on the third day initially tied the world record in the World Clay Target Championships, with 198 × 200, although it was broken later that day by Loral Dulaney with 199 × 200, and Miller finished second. She then concluded the event by winning the women's event of the Grand American Handicap, tying for first with a score of 98 × 100 and then winning the shootout with a perfect score of 25 × 25.

Miller competed with her husband, also an accomplished shooter, at the Delaware Skeet Shooting Championship in 1969, being the only woman participant; Pat Knight in The News Journal noted that "The part of the program that was most interesting was the performance of the lone [woman] participant, Rosemary Miller of Wilmington. She shot shoulder to shoulder with her male competitors and didn't give an inch. Her shooting ability was exceptional and was done with much poise and ease. In the four classes, she hit 365 out of 400–a mark that would put many of the male shooters to shame." Later in the year she participated at the Grand American Trapshoot again and won third in the Class tournament, recording a score of 195 × 200.

In May 1970, Miller was named to the women's trap shooting All-America first-team by Sports Afield magazine, an honor she would later receive again in 1972 and 1973, as well as selection to the second-team three other times; she also earned selection one year to the All-American skeet shooting team, being the only amateur to receive selection to the All-America team in both events in the same year. In August 1970, she competed at the 250 Target World All-Gauge Skeet Championships with her husband and both her sons, having the top performance with a score of 99 × 100. Later that month, she tied for the women's championship in the Grand American tournament with two others, scoring 95 × 100.

In 1972, Miller overall had the second-best score in the Grand American tournament, although she did not place top-three in any individual competition. The following year, she won the national All-Around Average Award and was selected by Trap & Field, the publication of the Amateur Trapshooting Association (ATA), as the second-best woman trap shooter in the U.S., behind Punkin Flock. In 1974, she won the Delaware trap shooting championship for the eighth and final time, and she later participated at the ATA national championships in August. In her career, she averaged a target hit rate of .934.

== Death and legacy ==
Miller died on December 3, 1974, at the age of 35 from a cerebral hemorrhage. The Wilmington Trapshooting Association organized the Rosemary Miller Memorial Shoot in 1975, in her honor. She was posthumously inducted into the Delaware Trapshooting Hall of Fame in 1979, into the Delaware Sports Museum and Hall of Fame in 1983, and into the Skeetshooting Hall of Fame in 2002.
