= Izzy Katzman =

American sportswriter

- Born: April 30, 1917; Dauphin, Pennsylvania, U.S.
- Died: October 30, 2007 (aged 90); Brandywine Hundred, Delaware, U.S.
- Occupation: Sportswriter
- Years active: 1936–1986
- Employer(s): Harrisburg Patriot News (1936–1950); Journal–Every Evening/The Evening Journal/The News Journal (1950–1986)
- Awards: 2× Delaware Sportswriter of the Year (1962, 1983); Delaware Sports Hall of Fame induction (1993)

Israel "Izzy" Katzman (April 30, 1917 – October 30, 2007) was an American sportswriter who worked with The News Journal for thirty-six years.

== Biography ==
Katzman was born on April 30, 1917, in Dauphin, Pennsylvania. He started a career as a journalist and sportswriter in 1936, being hired by the local Harrisburg Patriot News. He spent fourteen years with the Patriot News before being hired by Al Cartwright to work for the Journal–Every Evening, now The News Journal, as one of a three-man staff. He was awarded the Delaware Sportswriter of the Year award in 1962. He was given the award again in 1983, his thirty-third year with the newspaper. He retired in 1986, after thirty-six years with The News Journal and fifty years total as a journalist. He was given the Herm Reitzes Award, given to those with outstanding contributions to Delaware heritage, one year later. In 1993 Katzman was inducted into the Delaware Sports Hall of Fame, part of the Delaware Sports Museum and Hall of Fame, to which the Izzy Katzman Sports Library, named after him, was later added before his death. He died on October 30, 2007, at the age of 90.

Katzman wrote articles about all sports, but focused on harness racing and track and field. For his work on harness racing, he was awarded the John Hervey Award for excellence in reporting and was inducted into the Harness Racing Hall of Fame's Writers Corner.

After the death of Katzman, Kevin Noonan, a co-worker, said "Katzman, the former News Journal sportswriter who died on Tuesday at the age of 90, was a legend in our business, a member of two Halls of Fame and one of the most respected writers in the nation. I had the privilege to work closely with Izzy in the late 1970s when I was still a part-timer at the News Journal ... Everyone has special people in their lives, and I'm blessed that Izzy Katzman was one of mine."
