= Jerry Kobasa =

American sports coach and administrator

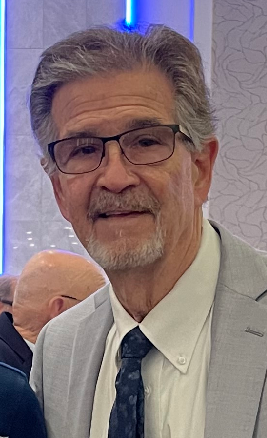
- Kobasa in 2026

Biographical details
- Born: 1949 or 1950 (age 76–77)

Playing career

Football
- 1967–1968: Wesley (DE)
- 1969–1970: Delaware State

Baseball
- c. 1968: Wesley (DE)
- Positions: Quarterback (football); Outfielder (baseball)

Coaching career (HC unless noted)

Basketball
- 1975–1976: Smyrna HS (DE) (JV)
- 1976–1981: Smyrna HS (DE)
- 1991–1995: Sussex Tech HS (assistant)
- 1995–2005: Sussex Tech HS
- 2005–2015: Wesley (DE)

Football
- 1971–1974: Delaware State (assistant)
- 1975: Wesley (DE) (offensive backfield)
- 1976–1980: Smyrna HS (DE) (assistant)

Administrative career (AD unless noted)
- 1991–2005: Sussex Tech HS
- 2015–2021: Seaford School District

Jerry Kobasa (born 1949 or 1950) is an American former basketball coach and administrator. He played college football as a quarterback for the Wesley Wolverines and Delaware State Hornets before becoming a coach, initially as an assistant football coach with both teams before becoming basketball coach at Smyrna High School. He served five years as head coach at Smyrna and was a winner of the Delaware Interscholastic Basketball Coach of the Year award in 1979 before retiring to enter the restaurant business in 1981. Kobasa later returned to coaching at Sussex Technical High School in 1991, where he was also athletic director and won over 160 games as basketball coach. He then worked as head coach of Wesley's basketball team from 2005 to 2015, becoming the program's all-time wins leader, before concluding his career as athletic director of the Seaford School District.

== Early life ==
Kobasa was born in 1949 or 1950, and is from Lansdale, Pennsylvania. He attended North Penn High School in Lansdale, where he played football and was a left-handed quarterback. As a senior in 1966, Kobasa was named honorable mention All-Bux-Mont. He then moved, at age 17, to Delaware, where he enrolled at Wesley Junior College in 1967. For the Wesley Wolverines, Kobasa played under coach Bob Andrus and was a backup as a freshman for a team that won a share of the conference title. He then became starter in 1968, helping the Wolverines rank eighth among junior colleges nationally. At Wesley, Kobasa also played baseball as an outfielder.

Kobasa transferred to Delaware State College, a historically black college, in 1969, and became the starting quarterback for the Delaware State Hornets. He led the team to a record of 4–5, completing 61 of 130 pass attempts for 736 yards and three touchdowns with six interceptions. Kobasa remained starter as a senior in 1970 and helped the Hornets to a 6–2 record.

== Coaching career ==
Kobasa served four years as an assistant coach for the Hornets under coach Arnold Jeter. He was a part-time assistant and worked with the offense. In 1975, he was hired as offensive backfield coach at Wesley. He also became a driver's education teacher and junior varsity basketball coach at Smyrna High School, posting a record of 11–9 during the 1975–76 season. He left Wesley in 1976 to stay at Smyrna, where he received a promotion to head basketball coach and also became assistant football coach. Kobasa's team posted a record of 7–11 in his first year as head coach. He then led a turnaround, posting a record of 12–9 in his second year – earning Henlopen Conference Coach of the Year honors – and a record of 14–7 in his third season. Kobasa was named both the Henlopen Conference Coach of the Year and the Delaware Interscholastic Basketball Coach of the Year in 1979. Following the 1980–81 season, he left his posts as basketball coach and assistant football coach to enter the restaurant business. He posted an overall record of 55–63 in his stint as Smyrna basketball coach.

During the 1980s, Kobasa ran The Sail Loft, a restaurant in Milford. He attended sports events from time to time but his restaurant's success gave him "little time to think about getting back into coaching". However, he returned to sports in 1991 after being offered a position as athletic director at Sussex Technical High School. He hired Buck Starkey, a former rival, as basketball coach, and became the assistant coach himself. Kobasa sold his restaurant following two years back in coaching and later ascended to head coach following Starkey's resignation in 1995, leading them to a record of 18–8 in his first year as head coach. For over a decade, he helped Sussex Tech to state tournament appearances every year and was regarded as one of the leading basketball coaches in the state. In 2004, he was named the Delaware Interscholastic Basketball Coach of the Year for a second time, following a 21–3 season. Kobasa, as head coach at Sussex Tech, led the team to an overall record of 166–57, winning the Henlopen Conference title four times.

Kobasa left Sussex Tech in 2005 to become head basketball coach at Wesley College. He became their all-time winningest coach, turning around a program that had only posted two winning seasons in the prior 17 years. Serving until 2015, Kobasa led the Wolverines to a record of 163–109. He helped the team reach the NCAA Division III Tournament four times, along with 10 appearances in the conference tournament, five in the conference title game, and two at the ECAC Tournament. Kobasa's Wolverines won 23 games during the 2013–14 season, the best in team history, and for it he was named a finalist for the national Division III coach of the year award. In 2015, Kobasa departed Wesley to become athletic director of the Seaford School District. He retired following 2021.

During his career, Kobasa was also active in the governance of Delaware high school sports. He became president of the Delaware Interscholastic Basketball Coaches Association in 1978 and also served as director of the Delaware High School All-Star Basketball Game. Kobasa also was the chairman of the Delaware Interscholastic Athletic Association (DIAA) for eight years.

Kobasa has received many honors for his career. He was inducted into the Wesley College Athletic Hall of Fame in 2001 and the Delaware State Athletic Hall of Fame in 2017. He was honored with the DIAA Lifetime Achievement Award in 2005 and inducted into the Blue-Gold All-Star Basketball Hall of Fame in 2013, (Note: The hall of fame for the Delaware high school basketball all-star game.) the Delaware Afro-American Sports Hall of Fame in 2015, and the Delaware Legends Basketball Hall of Fame in 2016. Kobasa was inducted into the Delaware Afro-American Sports Hall of Fame even though he is not African-American. He said he was not entirely certain what led to him getting picked for the hall of fame, saying, "That's a good question. I've had some people mention it to me before that because I've played and coached at Delaware State and have worked with kids over the years that I might be a good candidate. Then I got a nice call and letter letting me know that I'd be getting inducted." Kobasa was inducted into the Delaware Sports Museum and Hall of Fame as part of the class of 2020/2021. In 2026, he was inducted into the Delaware Basketball Hall of Fame.
