= Willy Miranda (coach) =

American former sports coach (born 1947)

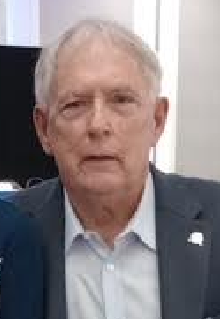
- Miranda in 2025

Biographical details
- Born: 1947 (age 78–79); Cuba

Playing career

Baseball
- 1967–1968: Baltimore JC
- 1969–1970: Delaware
- Position: Shortstop

Coaching career (HC unless noted)

Basketball
- 1973–1974: Wilmington HS (assistant girls)
- 1974–1984: Wilmington HS (girls)
- Brandywine HS (boys)

Field hockey
- Wilmington HS
- c. 1981–2019: Brandywine HS

Baseball / softball
- Brandywine HS

Lacrosse
- 1994–?: Brandywine HS

Football
- c. 1971: P. S. Dupont HS (freshman)

Swimming
- c. 1971: P. S. Dupont HS

Accomplishments and honors

Awards
- Delaware Sports Museum and Hall of Fame (2025)

Willy Miranda Jr. (born 1947) is an American former sports coach. The son of Major League Baseball player Willy Miranda, he coached numerous sports at various high schools in Delaware. He was inducted into the Delaware Sports Museum and Hall of Fame in 2025.

== Early life ==
Miranda was born in 1947 in Cuba, the son of Major League Baseball player Willy Miranda. He grew up in many different states in the U.S. as his father moved between teams, before the family settled in Baltimore, Maryland, at the end of Miranda Sr.'s career. Miranda Jr. played baseball growing up, being a shortstop, and attended Forest Park High School before entering Baltimore Junior College, where he played baseball. Afterwards, he played two years for the Delaware Fightin' Blue Hens at the University of Delaware (UD), helping them to their only-ever College World Series appearance in 1970. Following his stint at UD, he tried out for a professional baseball league in the Dominican Republic, but chose not to play there on the advice of his father.

== Career ==
After attending the University of Delaware, Miranda began teaching foreign languages at local high schools. He started at P. S. Dupont High School, where he was also the swimming and freshman football coach. He later taught at Wilmington High School, Alexis I. duPont High School, Mount Pleasant High School, Brandywine High School and Chester High School, all but Chester being in Delaware, and he coached different sports at many of them. He sometimes taught and coached at the same time he held teaching and coaching positions at other schools. In his career, he coached football, swimming, baseball, softball, girls basketball, boys basketball, field hockey, and girls lacrosse.

Miranda started coaching girls basketball at Wilmington High School as an assistant in 1973, then becoming the head coach in 1974. He coached there until 1984, for several years while he was serving at the same time as field hockey coach at Brandywine and as a teacher at Mount Pleasant. He coached field hockey for four years at Wilmington and then became the field hockey coach at Brandywine at the start of the 1980s. Before becoming field hockey coach at Wilmington, he had never seen a game before and said he "didn't know anything" about it. He served as a coach in baseball, field hockey, lacrosse and boys basketball at Brandywine, and his tenure with their field hockey team spanned 38 years until his retirement in 2019. Across 42 years as a field hockey coach, he won more than 450 games. He introduced night field hockey games to Delaware in the 1980s and led Brandywine to at least 10 Blue Hen Conference championships, with the school reaching the state championship four times (1983, 1987, 2007, 2008) and winning in 1987. He formed Brandywine's lacrosse team in 1994 and in total, all the teams he coached won over 1,200 games.

Miranda received the Outstanding Coach Award from the Delaware Women’s Alliance for Sports and Fitness in 2000. He was honored as the state field hockey Coach of the Year in 2008 and the Delaware Person of the Year for Girls Lacrosse in 2015. In 2008, he received the Herm Reitzes Award for Service to Sports from the Delaware Sportswriters and Broadcasters Association. He was inducted into the Delaware Lacrosse Hall of Fame in 2006 and to the Maryland Baseball Hall of Fame in 2021. He was ranked 81st on The News Journal's 2023 list of the "125 Greatest Coaches in Delaware History". In 2025, he was inducted into the Delaware Sports Museum and Hall of Fame.
