= Laura Taylor =

Laura Taylor may refer to:

- Laura Taylor (singer) (active since 2005), Brazilian singer
- Laura Taylor (softball) (active in 21st century), American softball player and coach
- Laura Taylor (swimmer) (born 1999), Australian swimmer
