= Ed Stone (baseball) =

American baseball player

- Outfielder
- Born: c. 1909 or 1910; Black Cat, Delaware, U.S.
- Died: March 20 or April 11, 1983; The Bronx, New York, U.S.
- Batted: Left Threw: Right

Negro league baseball debut
- 1931, for the Bacharach Giants

Last appearance
- 1950, for the New York Black Yankees

Teams
- Bacharach Giants (1931, 1933–1934); Brooklyn Eagles (1935); Newark Eagles (1936–1940, 1942–1943); Pittsburgh Crawfords (1936, 1946); Philadelphia Stars (1937, 1944–1946); Homestead Grays (1942); New York Black Yankees (1943, 1950)

Edward Daniel Stone (1909 or 1910 – March 20 or April 11, 1983), nicknamed "Ace", was an American Negro league outfielder who played from the 1930s to the 1950s. From Delaware, he attended Howard High School and began his professional career with a team led by his Howard coach. Across a career spanning 20 years in the Negro leagues, Stone was a three-time all-star. He also played several seasons in Mexico.

== Early life ==
Stone was born in 1909 or 1910: while the Social Security Death Index identified him as being born on August 21, 1909, other documents listed him with birthdates of January 2, 1909, August 22, 1909, August 23, 1909, August 21, 1910, or August 22, 1910. He is listed on Baseball Reference as having been born in Black Cat, Delaware, a small community near Wilmington, although some ship manifests identified him as being from Wilmington or Newport. By 1930, he was listed in the census as a resident of Christiana with the occupation of "day worker".

== Career ==
Stone played baseball and attended Howard High School, then began a professional career with the Wilmington Giants, coached by Millard Naylor of Howard. Stone, who batted left-handed and threw right-handed, had a professional career that ultimately lasted 20 years. He played briefly for the Wilmington Hornets and then joined the Atlantic City-based Bacharach Giants of the Negro National League in 1931 as an outfielder. After returning to them in 1933 and 1934, he played for the Brooklyn Eagles in 1935 and batted .324 with 56 hits and 37 runs batted in (RBIs), being named an all-star.

The Eagles were merged with the Newark Dodgers in 1936 and became the Newark Eagles, and Stone served as their starting right fielder that year, batting .317. He also played briefly for the Pittsburgh Crawfords in the 1936 season. He split the 1937 season with Newark and the Philadelphia Stars and in 1938, he posted a career-best batting average of .351 with a .598 slugging percentage as a member of the Eagles. He batted .342 with 31 RBIs in 1939, then batted .267 with 22 RBIs in 1940, being named an all-star each year.

After playing in the Mexican League in 1941, Stone returned to the Eagles in 1942 and also appeared for the Homestead Grays that year. He split the 1943 season with the Eagles and the New York Black Yankees. He then played for the Philadelphia Stars from 1944 to 1946, batting .347 in the 1944 season. In May 1946, he left the Stars to play in Mexico, and sportswriter W. Rollo Wilson noted that "Stone, one of the real sluggers of the [Stars], and whose long hits have kept many a rally going in past years, has already left for south of the border, where he will be assigned to one of the power-packed clubs of the so-called 'outlaws'". He also spent time that year with the Pittsburgh Crawfords and toured with Jackie Robinson's All-Stars.

Stone was still playing in Mexico by 1948, with one writer commenting that "Ed Stone, who ... swung a heavy bat for the Eagles and the Stars, is really whamming the pellet in Mexico." He returned to the New York Black Yankees in 1950, concluding his career at the age of 41. In his career, he was the Negro League leader among right fielders in assists in four seasons. He had a career batting average of .313 and an OPS of .852.

== Later life and death ==
Stone was married to Bernice Stone. According to Ryan Whirty in Delaware Today, after Stone's retirement, he "seemingly dropped off the face of the Earth, and his fate remains virtually unknown." He received a Social Security benefit while located in Long Island City, New York, in 1983, and he died that year on either March 20 or April 11, in The Bronx. His burial location is unknown. He was posthumously inducted into the Delaware Sports Museum and Hall of Fame in 2025.
