= Maxine Fluharty =

American field hockey coach

Personal information
- Height: 5 ft 3 in (160 cm)

Sport
- Sport: Field hockey
- Position: Midfielder / forward
Youth career
- Years: Team
- 2011–2014: Maryland
Senior career
Years	Team	Caps	Goals
c. 2015	HC Bloemendaal	-	-
National team
Years	Team	Caps	Goals
2013	United States		-

Maxine Fluharty is an American field hockey coach and former player. After a decorated career at Sussex Technical High School, she played in college for the Maryland Terrapins, where she was a first-team All-American and the Big Ten Conference Player of the Year. She also played for the United States national team. She was inducted into the Delaware Sports Museum and Hall of Fame in 2025.

== Early life ==
Fluharty is from Millsboro, Delaware. Her mother, Kathleen, was an All-American field hockey player at Northwestern, while her father, Kevin, was a national champion in the sport at Lycoming College. She started playing field hockey from a young age, with The News Journal stating that she was "practically born with a field hockey stick in her hands," and trained in the sport year-round, joining the U.S. Olympic development program at age 12.

Fluharty attended Sussex Technical High School where she played field hockey and lacrosse. The News Journal noted that she "put Sussex Tech on the state field hockey map." The team captain in field hockey, she was named first-team all-conference in all four years, three times first-team all-state, and twice as the state Player of the Year. She led Sussex Technical to the 2009 and 2010 state championships. In her last two years, she was named a national All-American by the NFHCA. She was also a three-time first-team all-state selection in her lacrosse career. Fluharty signed to play college field hockey for the Maryland Terrapins under coach Missy Meharg; Fluharty's mother, Kathleen, had played with Meharg years earlier for the national U20 team.

== College career ==
Fluharty was named second-team All-Mid Atlantic as a freshman at Maryland in 2011, contributing to their national championship team. She then was first-team All-Mid Atlantic as a sophomore and junior, with Maryland advancing to the Final Four each year. She was also a third-team All-American in her junior year, as she scored 12 goals and seven assists, also being named the winner of Maryland's Carla Tagliete Award, given to "the student-athlete who displays excellence both on the field and in the classroom." As a senior in 2014, Fluharty served as team captain and started all 23 games, scoring 15 goals and three assists, while being named a unanimous first-team All-Big Ten Conference selection, to the All-Big Ten Tournament team, the Big Ten Player of the Year and the Mid Atlantic Region Player of the Year. She was one of five finalists for the national player of the year award and concluded her collegiate career having totaled 38 goals and 19 assists.

After her collegiate career, Fluhary played professionally in the Women's Hoofdklasse Hockey league in the Netherlands for 18 months, being a member of the club HC Bloemendaal.

== International career ==
Fluharty joined the U.S. national under-16 team at around the age of 14. She was a member of the U16 team from 2006 to 2008 and participated at the 2007 Junior Olympics. She was called up to the U17 team for World Cup qualifiers in 2007, and later was a member of the U21 team, where she helped the U.S. win the bronze medal at the Junior Pan Am Games in 2012. She also played for the senior national team against New Zealand in 2013.

== Coaching career ==
After her playing career, Fluharty became a coach. She served as the head coach of Sussex Academy from 2020 to 2021, helping them reach their first state tournament with a state semifinals appearance in 2021. She then joined the Brown Bears as an assistant coach in 2022. She was inducted into the Delaware Sports Museum and Hall of Fame in 2025.
