= Ann Igo Rizzo =

American basketball and tennis player (born 1952)

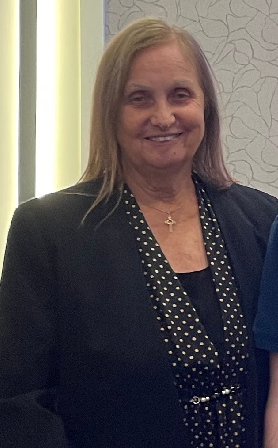
- Rizzo in 2026

Personal information
- Born: 1952 (age 73–74)
- Education: University of Delaware

Sport
- Sport: Basketball / tennis
- College team: Delaware Fightin' Blue Hens

Ann Marie Igo Rizzo (born 1952) is an American basketball and tennis player. She played college basketball for the Delaware Fightin' Blue Hens, where she ranked as the top scorer in school history upon her graduation. Rizzo later became a top athlete in senior competitions, winning several gold medals at the Senior Olympics. She was inducted into the Delaware Sports Museum and Hall of Fame in 2019.

== Biography ==
Rizzo is one of 14 children, and all of them played basketball at some level. She first played in second grade. Rizzo attended St. Elizabeth High School in Wilmington, Delaware, where she was a top basketball player and a member of the team all four years. She was also a member of a Catholic Youth Organization (CYO) team. After high school, Rizzo enrolled at the University of Delaware, where she attended from 1970 to 1974 as a physical education major. At Delaware, she played for the Delaware Fightin' Blue Hens women's basketball team from 1971 to 1974. After initially being a member of the freshman team in 1970–71, Rizzo became one of the early stars of Delaware's women's basketball program in the next seasons, playing under coach Mary Ann Hitchens.

Rizzo was a member of teams with winning records three consecutive years (Note: The first being the freshman team in 1970–71, followed by the varsity team in 1971–72 and 1972–73.) and helped the Fightin' Blue Hens to three straight appearances at the Eastern Association of Intercollegiate Athletics for Women (EAIAW) Regionals. Known for her quickness at guard, she averaged 13.0 points per game in 1971–72, 13.3 points in 1972–73, and 18.6 points in 1973–74, with all of those totals being top on the team. She helped the Fightin' Blue Hens to a record of 8–4 in her sophomore year, 9–5 in her junior year, and 7–8 in her senior year. Rizzo served as team captain in 1973–74. She had 20-point performances in 8 of 15 games during the 1973–74 season and at the end of her college career was top in school history in single-game (29), season (260), and career points (602), in addition to points per game in a season (18.6) and career points per game (14.8). Rizzo still ranked in the top 10 in school history for points per game in a season and in a career 45 years later.

After college, Rizzo was a member of a local basketball club, the Green Gate 76-hers, winning league MVP honors, and played recreational softball. She later began playing tennis in her 40s. Rizzo became a top athlete in senior competitions in both basketball and tennis. She won many gold medals at the Delaware Senior Olympics in both sports and was the singles tennis champion in her age group at the national Senior Olympics several times in the 2000s. Rizzo competed in senior events held by the United States Tennis Association (USTA) and was ranked number one in the USTA Middle States section in doubles and mixed doubles, while being a USTA national champion in women's senior doubles in 2003. She has also competed at the World Senior Games and been successful at many other regional senior tennis competitions.

Rizzo is married and has two children with her husband, Wayne. She received a degree from Wilmington University in 1994. She was inducted into the Delaware Legends Basketball Hall of Fame in 2010, the University of Delaware Athletics Hall of Fame in 2011, the Delaware Sports Museum and Hall of Fame in 2019, and the Delaware Basketball Hall of Fame in 2024.
