= Jonathan Stoklosa =

American powerlifter

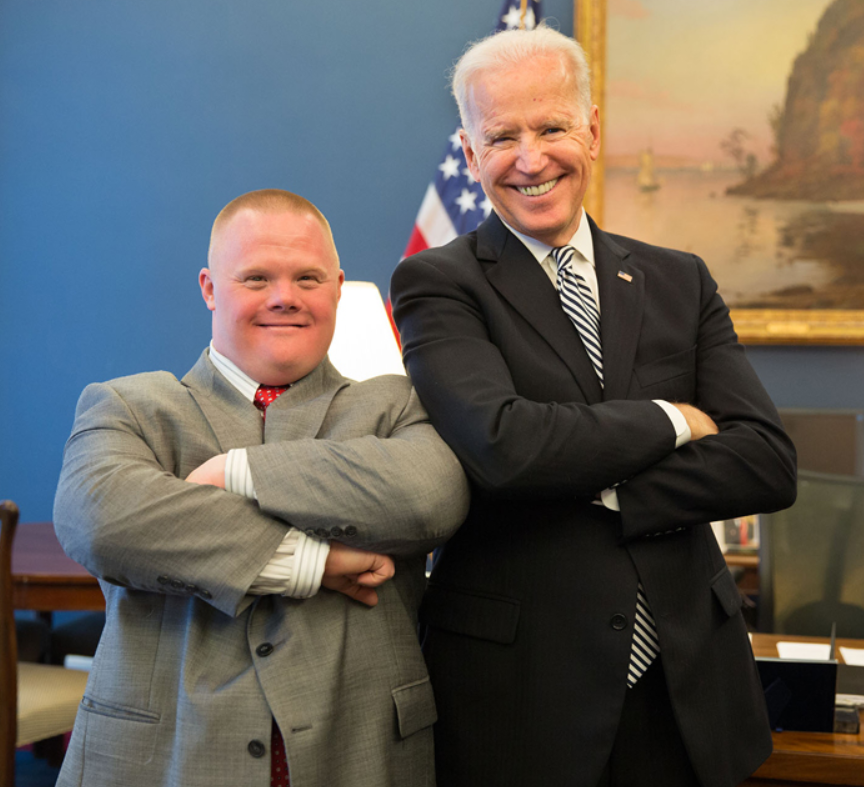
- Stoklosa (left) with Joe Biden in 2014

Personal information
- Born: 1981 or 1982 (age 42–43)
- Years active: c. 1994–present
- Height: 5 ft 5 in (165 cm)
- Weight: 204 lb (93 kg)

Sport
- Sport: Powerlifting

Jonathan Stoklosa (born 1981 or 1982) is an American powerlifter. Born with Down syndrome, he is a Special Olympics champion.

== Early life ==
Stoklosa was born with Down syndrome. He only started talking at age 11. He began weightlifting at age 12, after becoming interested due to his two brothers being athletes, and by age 13, he was able to lift 185 pounds (84 kg). He attended Newark High School in Newark, Delaware, where he won a varsity letter as a member of the wrestling team.

== Career ==
Five years into his career, Stoklosa competed at the 1999 Special Olympics World Summer Games and was the champion in the bench press, even though he was both the lightest and youngest participant in his class. He also won the bronze medal in the deadlift and was fourth in the squat event.

Since then Stoklosa has competed at many events, especially at the Delaware Special Olympics, where he has won over 100 medals and been described by The News Journal as a "cornerstone" of the powerlifting team. He was named the "Delaware Special Olympics Outstanding Athlete" in 2006 and was inducted into the Delaware Special Olympics Hall of Fame in 2018. Stoklosa has also competed at several USA Games, including winning four gold medals at the 2010 event and three gold medals at the 2014 event. His career bests are lifts of 425 pounds (193 kg) in the bench press, 425 pounds (193 kg) in the deadlift, and 385 pounds (175 kg) in the squat. He also participates in bowling, swimming, basketball, golf, and boxing.

Stoklosa is a speaker and advocate for those with disabilities and has been featured in a number of publications, including Sports Illustrated for Kids, Powerlifting USA, and National Public Radio's Only a Game. He has met with then-United States Vice President Joe Biden and is acquaintances with Arnold Schwarzenegger, having been named the "Lifter of the Day" at an Arnold Sports Festival competition.

Stoklosa was selected to be inducted into the Delaware Sports Museum and Hall of Fame in 2024.

== Personal life ==
Outside of sports, Stoklosa works at a local Acme Market.
