= Laura LeRoy Travis =

American tennis player and coach (born 1960s)

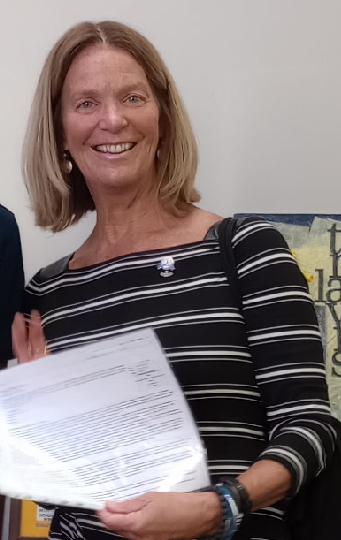
- Travis in 2025
- Born: 1966 or 1967 (age 58–59)
- Height: 5 ft 7 in (170 cm)
- College: Delaware

Coaching awards and records
- Awards Delaware Sports Museum and Hall of Fame (2025) Records 295–165 (women's); 217–180 (men's)

Laura LeRoy Travis (born 1966 or 1967) is an American former tennis player and coach. After being a Delaware state champion in high school, she played in college at the University of Delaware (UD) and was a three-time East Coast Conference (ECC) singles champion, as well as a one-time ECC doubles champion. After her playing career, she served as the head coach for both the men's and women's teams at UD for over 20 years, being a five-time conference coach of the year during her career. She was inducted into the Delaware Sports Museum and Hall of Fame in 2025.

== Early life and playing career ==
Travis is from Wilmington, Delaware, and began playing tennis at age 10 or 11. She competed in her first tournament at age 11, winning the Delaware State Class B Tournament. She attended Tower Hill School in Wilmington where she was a standout tennis player. She was Tower Hill's top singles player for five years and contributed to them winning four-straight team titles at the Delaware High School Tennis Championships. In singles, she was runner-up at the 1983 state championship as a sophomore, reached the semifinals as a junior in 1984, and then won the state title as a senior in 1985. She also played field hockey at Tower Hill, helping them win the state championship in 1982, and as a senior, she was team captain in both tennis and field hockey. She was named the school's outstanding female athlete in her senior year.

After graduating from Tower Hill, Travis enrolled at the University of Delaware (UD) in 1985 and became the No. 1 player on the tennis team as a freshman in both singles and doubles. She ended up being named the team MVP in all four years she played and helped them win four-straight East Coast Conference (ECC) championships. She was also an academic all-district selection in all four years. Travis won three ECC singles championships, in 1985, 1987, and 1988, and won the ECC doubles title with Ingrid Dellatorre in 1986. She became the all-time wins leader among UD doubles players in 1986 and then became the winningest player in singles in 1987.

According to The News Journal, Travis finished with "the finest career of any player at Delaware or in East Coast Conference history". She was the only player in ECC history with three conference singles titles and concluded with a singles record of 73–12. She served as Delaware's team captain for two years and compiled a doubles record of 26–9, setting the Delaware and ECC records, and as a senior had 16 consecutive wins, a UD record. She was named an ECC Scholar-Athlete and as a senior, was a nominee for UD's Amelia P. Warner award, an honor for the "woman who demonstrates leadership, academic success and community service".

Travis graduated from UD in 1989. She moved to Plantation, Florida, and decided to make "a 110-percent commitment to pro tennis". In the summer of 1989, she toured France and played in several small tournaments, winning one and receiving $200 in prize money. In 1990, she competed on the pro satellite tour in doubles, partnered with Danielle Webster, but "tore up her shoulder" in a match, requiring a surgery to repair ligaments in July 1990. She had a further surgery in February 1991, but returned to competition in July at the Delaware State Women's Tennis Championships. She reached the finals, but, still recovering from her shoulder injury, lost to Cindy Prendergast. Amidst her later coaching career, she continued to compete at Delaware tournaments, and in 1994 she defeated Prendergast for the state title. She was ranked the number one women's tennis player in the state in 1995 by the Delaware Tennis Association. She was the United States Professional Tennis Association (USPTA) Rookie of the Year in 1994 and the USPTA Women's Open Player of the Year in 1995.

== Coaching career ==
While recovering from her injury, Travis coached the boys tennis team at Alexis I. duPont High School in early 1991, then later that year was a volunteer assistant coach for the Delaware women's team. In 1992, she was named head women's tennis coach for Delaware. She also assisted Roy Rylander in coaching the men's team, and in 1993, she was named the successor to Rylander as head coach of the men's team as well. She was the first woman at Delaware to coach a men's team. She ended up serving 26 years as the women's coach and 21 years as the men's coach until her resignation in 2018. She was among the only women to ever coach a men's NCAA Division I athletic team for over 20 years and compiled a record of 217–180 (.544) as coach of the men's team with a record of 295–165 (.641) with the women's team.

With the women's team, Travis helped them place second at the America East Conference (AmEast) tournament every year from 1994 to 2001, and she was the AmEast Coach of the Year for the 1994–95, 1995–96, and 1999–2000 seasons. She helped them compile an undefeated record of 17–0 in the 1996–97 season, and she led them to a 42-win streak that was tied for the longest in school history among women's teams. As coach of the men's team, Travis's helped Delaware win at least 10 matches in 15 out of her 21 seasons, as they finished second at the AmEast tournament in 1995–96, reached the semifinals in 1995, 1998, and 1999, and won the championship in the 1996–97 season with a 15–5 record, the team's first title since 1974, and second overall. She was honored as the AmEast Men's Tennis Coach of the Year in 1996 and 1997.

== Personal life ==
She married Harrison Travis. Outside of coaching, Travis was a teacher at UD and an advisor to the school's club tennis team. She ran tennis camps and in 2003, she was honored with the USTA/ITA National Campus Recreation Award, "for growing the sport of tennis on a college campus". She was active in the community, organizing tennis events, serving on the board of directors for several organizations, and being a frequent participant in the "Tennis in the Streets" event, which "bussed in hundreds of under resourced children to expose them to 'tennis in the streets'".

Travis was inducted into the University of Delaware Athletics Hall of Fame in 2001, the Delaware Tennis Hall of Fame in 2009, and the UTSA Middle States Section Hall of Fame in 2014. After her coaching career ended, she started competing in tennis again, participating in national age group tournaments. In 2025, she inducted into the Delaware Sports Museum and Hall of Fame.
