= Kurt Howell =

American wrestler and coach

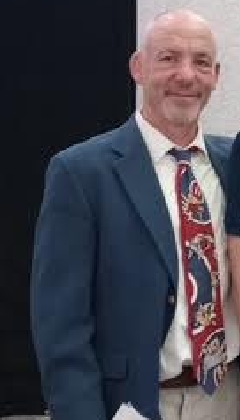
- Howell in 2025

Personal information
- Nationality: American
- Born: 1967 or 1968 (age 58–59)
- Education: Clemson University; St. Cloud State University
- Weight: 126 lb (57 kg)

Sport
- Sport: Wrestling
- College team: Clemson Tigers

Kurt Howell (born 1967 or 1968) is an American former wrestler and coach. He was a four-time Delaware state champion at Newark High School and later was an All-American at Clemson University. After his competitive career, he served as a high school coach and developed 19 state champions. He was inducted into the Delaware Sports Museum and Hall of Fame in 2025.

== Biography ==
Howell has two brothers who also competed in wrestling: Dicky and Brad. After watching his brother at the Newark YMCA, he began wrestling at age seven and "started winning" in events in fifth grade. At age 12, he started weightlifting, and in 1982, won two wrestling gold medals at the AAU Grand Nationals and one at the National Junior Olympics. Later that year, at age 14, he won the U16 World Schoolboy Tournament in his weight class in the freestyle event.

Howell attended Newark High School and as a freshman in 1983 went undefeated and won the state title in his class, at 98 pounds (44 kg). He remained undefeated and won further titles in 1984, 1985 and 1986, at 105 pounds (48 kg), 112 pounds (51 kg) and 119 pounds (54 kg), respectively. In addition to his state titles, he was also a four-time winner of the Blue Hen Conference championship and was a three-time MVP of the state tournament. Although most high school wrestlers at the time fought "20 or 25 bouts a season", Howell noted that he was sometimes fighting over 100 bouts a year and winning nearly all of them. He finished his high school career as one of the most decorated wrestlers in Delaware history with a perfect record of 108–0. At the same time, he won the Greco-Roman World Schoolboy title in 1984 and was also selected to the national high school all-star team.

Howell competed in college at Clemson University on a wrestling scholarship, where he battled injuries during his collegiate career. He compiled a record of 23–6 as a freshman and was named the school's outstanding wrestler as well as the second-best freshman nationally by the publication Amateur Wrestling News. He redshirted as a sophomore and then compiled a record of 24–10–1 as a junior, placing third at the Atlantic Coast Conference (ACC) tournament; he later competed at the NCAA Tournament and finished one point away from eighth, which would have made him an All-American. He was an alternate for the U.S. World Cup team in 1989 and in 1990, won the ACC championship in his weight class (126 pounds (57 kg)). In 1991, his final year competing, he placed eighth at the NCAA Championships and thus became an All-American. He concluded his collegiate career with a record of 100–22. After graduating from Clemson, Howell attempted to qualify for the 1992 Summer Olympics in the Greco-Roman discipline, but lost in the Olympic trials to Dennis Hall. He was named an alternate for the Olympics but did not travel to the games. Later that year, he competed for the U.S. at the World Cup but was defeated in the finals.

Afterwards, Howell became a coach, starting as a graduate assistant at St. Cloud State University in Minnesota. He later returned to Delaware in 1998 as the wrestling coach at Indian River High School. He moved to Smyrna High School in 2004. He served as Smyrna's coach for 14 seasons and led them to five team state championships, as well as coached 19 wrestlers who won a combined total of 29 state championships. He stepped down as Smyrna's coach in 2018 and was inducted into the Delaware Wrestling Hall of Fame the following year. He was ranked 85th on The News Journal's 2023 list of the "125 Greatest Coaches in Delaware History". In 2025, he was inducted into the Delaware Sports Museum and Hall of Fame.
