= Ray Peden =

American swimmer

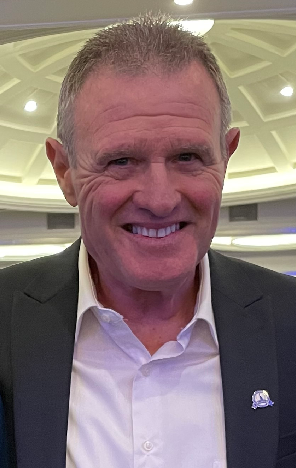
- Peden in 2026

Personal information
- Born: 1954 or 1955 (age 71–72)
- Height: 6 ft 1 in (185 cm)
- Weight: 180 lb (82 kg)

Sport
- Sport: Swimming
- Club: Wilmington Aquatic Club
- College team: York College of Pennsylvania

Ray Peden (born 1954 or 1955) is an American swimmer. He was a state champion in high school in Delaware and later competed at York College of Pennsylvania, where he was a four-year captain of the varsity team and set numerous school records. Peden later entered open water swimming, winning various competitions and becoming the second person from Delaware to swim the English Channel, which he accomplished in 1986.

== Biography ==
Peden started swimming at age five. Growing up, he was a member of the Wilmington Aquatic Club in Delaware, learning under coach Bob Mattson from 1963 to 1972. He attended Salesianum School in Wilmington where he competed in swimming and was a member of the varsity team all four years. The Evening Journal described him as an "outstanding" swimmer at Salesianum and noted "He participated in four state tournaments [and] never finished below third in any event." As a senior at Salesianum in 1973, Peden served as team captain and helped them to the first state championship.

After his graduation from high school, Peden, who stood at 6 feet 1 inch (1.85 m) and weighed 180 pounds (82 kg) during his career, attended York College of Pennsylvania. At York, he studied police science. Peden served as team captain of York's swimming team in all four years he attended. According to his coach, Pat Massa, he was the only person to ever captain a York varsity team as a freshman, and he was also active in other sports including judo. Peden won first place 95 times, second place 12 times and third place three times during his time at York, breaking 42 pool and team records. He was the 1977 winner of the Daniel J. Klinediest Award, given to York's most outstanding athlete. Peden graduated in 1977. He was later inducted into the school's Athletic Hall of Fame in 1990.

Following his York career, Peden began competing in open water swimming. He competed at the Ironman World Championship in Hawaii in 1982 and in 1984, broke the U.S. record in the 26.2-mile swim, "completing the task by swimming 1,846 lengths of a 25-yard pool in just over 12 hours". In early 1986, Peden decided to attempt to cross the English Channel, a length of over 20 miles. He was successful and completed the crossing with a time of 11 hours and 34 minutes. According to The News Journal, he was the 287th person known to have successfully swam the channel. Peden was also the second person from Delaware to accomplish the feat, and for it he was honored with the Order of the First State, the state's top civilian honor, by Governor Mike Castle. Peden has also competed in masters swimming, winning bronze in the 45–49 age group at the U.S. Masters open water race in 2004. In 2010, he won the men's event at the 12.5 mile Ocean Water Swim Around Key West. He later won the 2.5-kilometer event at the U.S. Masters Open Water National Championships in the 60–64 age bracket. Peden has also ranked among the top three finishers in his age group at the Great Chesapeake Bay Bridge 4.4-mile swim a total of eight times as of 2023.

Peden served with the Delaware State Police for 29 years until his retirement in 2009. He has also worked as a lifeguard in Rehoboth Beach and has worked as a swimming official, being certified by the NCAA, as well as on the U.S. Middle Atlantic Open Water Swimming Committee. Peden is married and has a daughter. In 2023, he was inducted into the Delaware Sports Museum and Hall of Fame.
