= Patrick Castagno =

American track and field coach

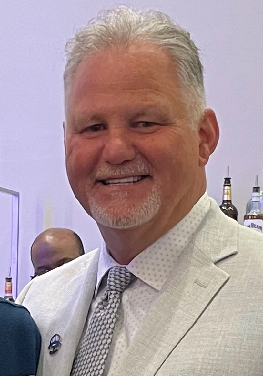
- Castagno in 2026

Current position
- Title: Track and field / cross country coach
- Team: Tatnall Hornets

Biographical details
- Born: 1964 (age 61–62)
- Education: University of Delaware

Playing career

Track and field
- 1983–1988: Delaware

Cross country
- 1983–1988: Delaware

Coaching career (HC unless noted)

Track and field
- 2001–present: Tatnall School

Cross country
- 2001–present: Tatnall School

Patrick W. Castagno is an American track and field coach. He has served as the track and field and cross country coach at the Tatnall School in Wilmington, Delaware, since 2001. Castagno has led Tatnall to over 60 team state championships and over 270 state championships in individual and relay events. In 2026, he was inducted into the Delaware Sports Museum and Hall of Fame.

== Biography ==
Castagno attended Salesianum School and later the University of Delaware, competing for both schools in long-distance running. At Salesianum, he was coached by the Reverend Joseph Beattie, an inductee to the Delaware Sports Museum and Hall of Fame, whose ideas influenced Castagno's future coaching philosophy. At the University of Delaware, Castagno competed for the cross country and track teams from 1983 to 1988 under coach Jim Fischer. He received a master's degree in biomechanics from Delaware and later carried out high-level research at the university. Castagno also worked at the Alfred I. du Pont Hospital for Children, where he served as director of the gait lab.

In 2001, Castagno was hired by the Tatnall School as a teacher. He also became coach of both the boys' and girls' track and field and cross country teams. Across his tenure of over two decades, he turned Tatnall, a small school, into "a cross country and track and field powerhouse", according to The News Journal. He led Tatnall teams to numerous state championships along with top performances at many regional and national tournaments as well. As of March 2026, Castagno had led the school to 62 state championships and coached 273 individual and relay state champions. Castagno won his 60th state championship in 2024 shortly after his 60th birthday. He holds the all-time state record for outdoor track championships as a coach.

Castagno has coached five athletes and eight teams to appearances at the Nike Cross Nationals, and a Tatnall girls distance medley relay team won the 2012 Penn Relays with a time that broke the event record and stood for more than a decade. He also coached three teams to national championships in the 4 × mile relay. Over 75 of his athletes went on to compete in the NCAA, and one of them, Juliet Bottorff, won a national title. He also coached Sam Parsons, the first person to run a sub-four-minute mile in Delaware.

Castagno won the Tubby Raymond Award, given to Delaware's overall coach of the year, in 2005, and has been named the Delaware Track and Field Coach of the Year 15 times as of 2026. He is also a five-time winner of the U.S. Track and Field Coaches Association Coach of the Year award. He ranked ninth on The News Journal's 2023 list of the "125 Greatest Coaches in Delaware History", and was the highest-ranking track coach. In 2025, he was elected to the New York Armory Coaches Track and Field Hall of Fame. Castagno was inducted into the Delaware Sports Museum and Hall of Fame in 2026. He is also a member of the board of directors of the Delaware Track and Field Hall of Fame.
