= Lou Romanoli =

American sportsman

Biographical details
- Born: 1935 or 1936 (age 89–90); Fairfax, Delaware, United States

Playing career

Baseball
- 1953–1956: Delaware
- c. 1950s: St. Anthony's
- 1960s: Brooks Armored Car

Football
- c. 1963–1968: Brooks Armored Car

Basketball
- 1960s: Brooks Armored Car
- Positions: Third baseman / shortstop / pitcher (baseball); Quarterback (football)

Coaching career (HC unless noted)

Baseball
- 1960s: Brooks Armored Car

Football
- 1960s: Brooks Armored Car

Basketball
- 1960s: Brooks Armored Car

Administrative career (AD unless noted)
- 1967: Wilmington Blue Bombers (GM)

Accomplishments and honors

Championships
- 2× DSBL (1963, 1964); 3× WFL (1963, ?); 1× IBL (1963)

Awards
- Delaware Sports Museum and Hall of Fame (2020/2021)

Lou Romanoli Jr. (born 1935 or 1936) is an American former sportsman. He was involved in baseball, football and basketball as a player, coach, and manager, and was inducted into the Delaware Sports Museum and Hall of Fame as part of the class of 2020/2021.

== Early life ==
Romanoli is from Fairfax, Delaware. He attended Wilmington High School where he played baseball, and after that, attended the University of Delaware and played for the Delaware Fightin' Blue Hens baseball team. A shortstop, third baseman, and occasional pitcher, he started every game across his four years at Delaware, with the first being on the freshman team and the final three on the varsity team. He was teammates with Dallas Green for three years and as a senior in 1956 under coach Tubby Raymond, helped Delaware compile a record of 18–3 while winning the Middle Atlantic Conference championship. They advanced to the NCAA tournament, the first in school history.

== Career ==
Romanoli began playing semi-professional baseball in the 1950s, starting with St. Anthony's Catholic Club in the Delaware Semi-Pro Baseball League. He ended up playing 13 years in the Semi-Pro League and also played four years in the Delaware County League. After several seasons with St. Anthony's, Romanoli moved to the Brooks Armored Car team in the Semi-Pro League, serving as a player-manager. According to The Morning News, as player-manager, he "helped write some of the greatest chapters in the history of the Semi-Pro League". He and John Hickman of perennial champion Parkway had a bitter rivalry, and the two frequently clashed.

In 1963, Romanoli, "tired of losing to Parkway", signed several former MLB players to his team, including Harry Anderson, Ray Narleski, Bob Davis, and Jack Crimian. That season, Romanoli, playing at third base, was named a league all-star and batted .305 while leading the team in runs batted in (RBIs). They reached the league championship and faced off against Parkway, with the ensuing games averaging attendances of over 4,000, higher than some games played by the Philadelphia Phillies that year. Brooks Armored Car swept Parkway, and the following year, won the championship again.

In addition to his success with Brooks Armored Car in baseball, Romanoli also played and coached for them in football (playing at quarterback), as a member of the Wilmington Football League, and in basketball, as a member of the Industrial Basketball League. He was captain of the basketball team and in 1963, he won championships in all three sports, while his football team won three championships and finished as runner-up twice between the 1963 and 1968 seasons. Outside of playing, Romanoli worked for a printing company. He also played softball and served as a basketball official. In 1967, he served as general manager of the Wilmington Blue Bombers in the Eastern Basketball League.

After his career in baseball, football, and basketball, Romanoli was active as a runner, competing at the Wilmington Caesar Rodney Half-Marathon for 25 years straight, as well as at the 1980 Boston Marathon. He was named the Wilmington Junior Chamber of Commerce Young Man of the Year in 1964 and received the Service Award from Sport Magazine in 1969. He was the second president of the Delaware Sports Museum and Hall of Fame, serving from 1980 to 1982, and was inducted into the hall of fame as part of the class of 2020/2021.
