= Robin Adair Harvey =

American field hockey player and coach

Personal information
- Born: 1965 or 1966 (age 60–61)

Sport
- Sport: Field hockey
- Position: Attacker / midfielder
Youth career
- Years: Team
- 1983–1984: Davis & Elkins
- 1985–1986: Salisbury
Coaching career
- Years: Team
- 1988: Miami (OH) (assistant)
- 1990–1993: Tower Hill School (assistant)
- 1994–2017: Tower Hill School

Robin Adair Harvey (born 1965 or 1966) is an American former field hockey player and coach. She was inducted into the Delaware Sports Museum and Hall of Fame in 2025.

== Biography ==
From Baltimore, Maryland, Adair grew up in Rehoboth Beach, Delaware, and attended Cape Henlopen High School. She played three years of field hockey and softball as well as two years of basketball at Cape Henlopen. She was the state's leading scorer two years and was all-state as well as first-team All-Henlopen Conference as a senior, when she helped Cape Henlopen reach the state championship. She graduated from Cape Henlopen in 1983 and afterwards enrolled at Davis & Elkins College in West Virginia.

At Davis & Elkins, Adair played two years of field hockey and one year of softball. After her two years of field hockey for Davis & Elkins, a Division I school, she transferred to Division III Salisbury State University in 1985. In her first year, 1985, she scored a team-leading 26 goals and helped Salisbury State to the NCAA Tournament while being named first-team Division III All-American. She then led Salisbury State with 19 goals and six assists in 1986, repeating as a first-team All-American selection. She helped Salisbury State compile a record of 21–0 while winning the Division III national championship, their first in any sport. She was named the Tournament MVP. She was named the 1986 recipient of the Lower Delaware Gridiron Club's Collegiate Athlete of the Year Award, being the first woman to receive the honor. She was later inducted into the Salisbury State Sports Hall of Fame in 1998.

After her career at Salisbury State, Adair attended Miami University in Ohio for two years, earning a master's degree in exercise science. In 1988, she served as an assistant coach for Miami's field hockey team. After she graduated from Miami, Adair became an assistant coach for Tower Hill School in Wilmington, Delaware, in 1990. She also worked for the Pike Creek Fitness Club after returning to Delaware. She was promoted to head coach at Tower Hill in 1994 and lost in the state championship in three straight years before winning in 1997. She ended up serving 24 seasons as Tower Hill's coach, compiling a record of 396–44–16 (a .886 winning percentage) and helping the school win the state championship 10 times with a further seven appearances in the title game. She had two players (Meredith Keller and Caitlin Van Sickle) who appeared for the U.S. national team and many others who played at high-level colleges. She retired prior to the 2018 season. She was ranked 74th on The News Journal's 2023 list of the "125 Greatest Coaches in Delaware History". In 2025, she was inducted into the Delaware Sports Museum and Hall of Fame.
