= Pamela Maier =

American politician

Member of the Delaware House of Representatives from the 21st district
- In office 1995–2008
- Preceded by: Steve Taylor
- Succeeded by: Mike Ramone

Personal details
- Born: June 2, 1956 Duncan, Oklahoma, U.S
- Party: Republican
- Spouse: David
- Children: 2
- Education: Oklahoma State University (BS, MS)

Pamela Maier is an American politician who served in the Delaware House of Representatives for the 21st district from 1995 to 2008.

A Republican, she supported Rudy Giuliani's 2008 presidential campaign.
