= Gary Chelosky =

American competitive swimmer (1951–2019)

Personal information
- Born: November 2, 1951 Wilmington, Delaware, U.S.
- Died: January 23, 2019 (aged 67)
- Education: University of Florida
- Years active: c. 1959–c. 1977

Sport
- Sport: Swimming
- College team: Florida Gators

John "Gary" Chelosky (November 2, 1951 – January 23, 2019) was an American competitive swimmer. He was inducted into the Delaware Sports Museum and Hall of Fame in 2024.

== Biography ==
Chelosky was born on November 2, 1951, in Wilmington, Delaware. He began swimming competitively at an early age and was successful at Delaware Amateur Athletic Union (AAU) tournaments in the early 1960s. He repeatedly won Delaware youth championships and in 1962 set the national record in the 10-and-under category for the 50-yard breaststroke, having a time of 36 seconds. He was the first person from Delaware to hold a national swimming record.

Later, Chelosky attended Salesianum School in Wilmington where he remained a successful swimmer, after having spent time away from the sport due to injury. In his senior year of high school, he set records while winning all three events at the state swimming championships in 1969 and then won all four events at the state AAU championships later that year.

Chelosky attended the University of Florida and was a member of the Florida Gators swimming and diving program. He won the Southeastern Conference title in 1971 and 1972 in the 200-yard breaststroke and also won the 100-yard breaststroke title in 1972. He held Gator records in three events and was named the school's athlete of the year as a sophomore in 1971. He was named an All-American in all four seasons he competed at the school.

Chelosky also competed for the United States at the 1971 Pan American Games in Cali, Colombia. He was a finalist for selection to the 1972 Summer Olympics. He continued swimming after his collegiate career and won the 100-yard breaststroke masters championship in the 25-29 age category in 1977. He later was a coach at a local YMCA.

Chelosky was married and had a daughter. He died on January 23, 2019, at the age of 67. He was posthumously selected for induction into the Delaware Sports Museum and Hall of Fame in 2024.
