= Laura Taylor (softball) =

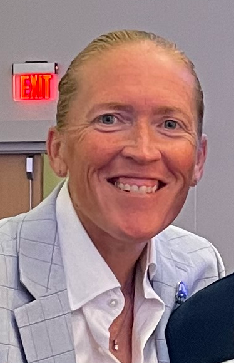
- Taylor in 2026
- Catcher / first baseman

Teams
- Seton Hall (2002–2005)

Laura Taylor is an American softball coach and former player. From Hockessin, Delaware, she was an all-state catcher in high school before playing college softball for the Seton Hall Pirates as a catcher and first baseman from 2002 to 2005. She was the national home runs leader as a freshman and went on to break the school record with 59 career home runs, a mark that ranks in the top 20 in NCAA Division I history. Taylor was the Big East Conference Player of the Year as a senior and helped Seton Hall to two NCAA Tournament appearances. She was also selected to participate in the 2004 Olympic Team trials for softball. In 2005,Taylor played professional fastpitch softball for the New York/New Jersey Juggernaut in the National Professional Fastpitch League (NPF), the world's top professional fastpitch league at that time, and was named NPF Player of the Week for two consecutive weeks. In 2026, she was inducted into the Delaware Sports Museum and Hall of Fame.

== Early life ==
Taylor is from Hockessin, Delaware. Her father, Jeff, played catcher and pitcher and was selected in the 1978 MLB draft by the New York Yankees. Her uncle, Steve, Jeff's twin brother and also a pitcher, was a first round pick of the Yankees in the 1977 draft and later a politician. She played baseball for a Little League team in Newark for the first time at age seven, where she played with boys and was at times the only girl on the team. Taylor attended Padua Academy where she played softball, winning a starting role at catcher as a freshman. That year, she posted a batting average of .420, led the team in doubles, triples and home runs, and was named to the All Catholic Second Team. Taylor was named honorable mention all-state as a sophomore. As a junior, she batted .436 with 17 runs batted in (RBIs) and 16 runs while only making one throwing error. Taylor batted .483 as a senior in 2001 and was unanimously named first-team all-state.

Prior to her senior season, Taylor committed to play college softball for the Seton Hall Pirates.

== College career ==
At Seton Hall, Taylor played as a catcher and first baseman. As a freshman at in 2002, Taylor was the NCAA Division I leader in home runs with 18, also breaking the Seton Hall single-season record, which was 15. She also led the team with 37 RBIs and batted .331. Taylor's home runs total came despite her having only scored four in her entire high school career. She attributed the difference to the fences present in college softball. Taylor said, "It's purely the fence, the fact that they can't back up as far as they want to. I haven't changed my swing at all. I used to hit singles and a lot of doubles. There weren't fences and I wasn't fast. Teams always played me deep, so most of the time I would hit it in front of them and get singles or hit it in the gaps and get doubles, maybe a triple if I was lucky." For her 2002 performance, she was named first-team All-Big East Conference, first-team All-Northeast, to the Big East all-rookie team, and the Seton Hall Freshman Athlete of the Year.

Taylor helped Seton Hall to a regular season record of 37–12 with an appearance in the Big East tournament as a sophomore in 2003. She appeared in 51 games and led the Big East with 13 home runs, also recording a batting average of .307 with 42 RBIs while being named Seton Hall's Sophomore of the Year. Taylor was again named First-Team All-Big East and First-Team All-Northeast as both a junior and senior. In 2004, she posted 14 home runs and helped Seton Hall to their first Big East championship along with an appearance in the NCAA Tournament. This was followed by helping Seton Hall to another conference championship and NCAA Tournament appearance as a senior in 2005. She posted 13 home runs and 42 RBIs while batting .321, being named the Big East Softball Player of the Year, the first Seton Hall player ever to receive the honor. Taylor concluded her collegiate career with 59 home runs, two times more than anyone else in school history and a mark that placed in the top 10 in NCAA Division I history at the time her Seton Hall career ended. As of 2026, Taylor's total ranks 18th in Division I history. She also posted 160 RBIs, a Seton Hall record, and 180 hits, second in school history, while ranking in the top 10 in school history with a batting average of .309 and 33 doubles, in addition to breaking the Big East home runs record.

In 2002, Taylor was one of 52 players invited to the USA Softball national team camp. She was also a candidate to represent the United States at the 2004 Summer Olympics, although she was not selected for the final roster. While at Seton Hall, she was named to the Academic All-Big East team in all four years.

== Later career ==
Taylor competed in the ASA Women's Class A Fast Pitch league as a member of the New Jersey Divas, winning All-American honors in 2003. She later played for the New York/New Jersey Juggernaut of the National Professional Fast-Pitch League, which at the time was the top-level professional softball league. She was a two-time league player of the week. After her playing career, Taylor became a coach, serving as an assistant coach for the Providence Friars in 2006, after which she joined the St. John's Red Storm. Taylor worked for the Red Storm for four years and then for three years with the Jacksonville Dolphins. She also started a training center in Jacksonville, Florida, known as Five-Tool Training.

Taylor was inducted into the Seton Hall Athletics Hall of Fame in 2019. In 2026, she was inducted into the Delaware Sports Museum and Hall of Fame.
