= Mary Ann Hitchens =

American sports coach

Biographical details
- Born: 1944 or 1945 (age 80–81)
- Education: University of Delaware

Coaching career (HC unless noted)

Basketball
- 1967–1968: Springer Junior HS
- 1968–1969: Brandywine HS
- 1969–1970: Delaware (freshman HC)
- 1970–1978: Delaware

Field hockey
- 1968: Springer Junior HS
- 1969: Brandywine HS
- 1973–1988: Delaware

Administrative career (AD unless noted)
- 1969–2006: Delaware (administrator)

Accomplishments and honors

Awards
- Delaware Sports Museum and Hall of Fame (1997); University of Delaware Athletics Hall of Fame (1999); National Field Hockey Coaches Association Hall of Fame (2015); ECAC Hall of Fame (2016)

Mary Ann Hitchens (born 1944 or 1945) is an American former sports coach and administrator. From Milford, Delaware, she graduated from the University of Delaware and was influential in developing the women's athletic program at the school, where she coached the women's basketball and field hockey teams. She was the first woman to be president of the North Atlantic Conference and had several other administrative roles.

== Early life ==
Hitchens was born in 1944 or 1945. She grew up in Milford, Delaware, and attended Milford High School, where she played basketball, field hockey and softball. She won four varsity letters there and scored over 1,000 points as a basketball player at Milford. She attended the University of Delaware but the school did not have a women's athletic program at the time, with Hitchens thus playing sports in local leagues and at intramural levels. She graduated from the university in 1967.

== Coaching career ==
In 1967, Hitchens began serving as a teacher as well as the women's basketball and field hockey coach at Springer Junior High School. She then had the same roles at Brandywine High School in 1968. Hitchens returned to the University of Delaware in 1969 to get a master's degree.

That year, women's sports at the school had begun on an "experimental" basis. Hitchens was hired to the staff of the women's basketball team as coach of the freshman squad. She later recalled that all three startup teams (basketball, swimming and field hockey) had a combined budget of $1,500 and that players often bought their own uniforms; women were also not allowed to use the sports facilities used by men and thus had to play on poorly-made fields, or, in the case of the swimming team, had to play their games away due to the facilities being inadequate for competition against other schools.

In 1970, Hitchens was promoted to head basketball coach and in 1973, she also added the duty of field hockey coach. She was considered a "driving force" in the development of Delaware women's athletics and became one of the school's best coaches. She served as the basketball coach from 1970 to 1978 and compiled an overall record of 75–35, while she was the field hockey coach from 1973 to 1988 and had an overall record of 196–76–30.

Hitchens' basketball teams had a winning season every year and reached six regional championships in eight seasons. She coached six basketball players who received Delaware "Outstanding Senior Player of the Year" honors. In field hockey, she helped Delaware have 15 winning seasons in 16 years. She coached 17 players to All-East Coast Conference (ECC) honors, 14 to All-American status and three who received conference player of the year honors. Hitchens was named the ECC Coach of the year on four occasions and made the team a "national power", winning the conference championship three times while playing in the national playoffs six times, which included four appearances in the Final Four and a second-place finish in 1978. She retired from being a coach in 1989.

Hitchens was also an administrator at Delaware from when she joined the team in 1969 until retiring in 2006. Among the positions she served at the school: assistant director of athletics, associate director of athletics, senior associate director of athletics, coordinator of women's athletics and chair of the Women's Intercollegiate Athletics Council. Additionally, she served on the Eastern College Athletic Conference (ECAC) executive council from 1983 to 1986, on the University of Delaware's Commission on the Status of Women, including two terms as chair, was a designated National Collegiate Athletic Association (NCAA) senior woman administrator from 1977 to 2006, was a member of the NCAA Field Hockey Committee for four years, which included two years as chair, and was the first woman to be president of the North Atlantic Conference, in addition to being the vice president, chair of the gender equity committee and member of the field hockey sports committee in that conference.

== Honors ==
Hitchens received numerous honors and awards for her service to women's athletics. She was given the ECAC Josten's Distinguished Service Award in 1992 and received the Katherin Ley Award in 2000, given "to honor a women's athletics administrator who is a strong proponent of opportunities for women's athletics, a strong leader and a role model for women coaches and administrators". She was named a recipient of the E. Arthur Trabant Award for Women's Equity at Delaware and was given the pathfinder award by the National Association of Girls and Women's Sports. Hitchens was inducted into the Delaware Sports Museum and Hall of Fame in 1997, into the University of Delaware Athletics Hall of Fame in 1999, was honored as part of the University of Delaware Alumni Wall of Fame in 2007, and was inducted into the National Field Hockey Coaches Association (NFHCA) Hall of Fame in 2015. Delaware created the Mary Ann Hitchens Award in 2007, which is given annually to a senior "who has exhibited the qualities of hard work, dedication, leadership, fairness and striving for excellence that were the hallmarks of Hitchens' career". She was ranked 13th on The News Journal's 2023 list of the "125 Greatest Coaches in Delaware History".
