= Marcy Levine =

American gymnast (born 1960)

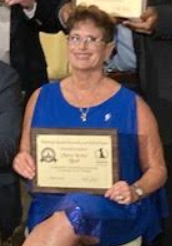
- Levine in 2024

Personal information
- Born: 16 January 1960 (age 66) Wilmington, Delaware
- Education: Pennsylvania State University
- Years active: c. 1967–1982

Sport
- Sport: Gymnastics
- College team: Penn State Nittany Lions
Medal record
Women's gymnastics
Representing United States
Maccabiah Games
Gold medal – first place	1977 Tel Aviv	Balance beam event
Bronze medal – third place	1977 Tel Aviv	All-around event
Representing Penn State Nittany Lions
By competition
Event	1st	2nd	3rd
AIAW Championships	1	0	1
NCAA Championships	0	0	1
Total	1	0	2
AIAW Championships
Gold medal – first place	1979	Floor event
Bronze medal – third place	1980	Floor event
NCAA Championships
Bronze medal – third place	1982 Salt Lake City	Team event

Marcy Levine Lucas (born 16 January 1960) is an American former gymnast. She competed for the Penn State Nittany Lions and won a national championship in 1979. She was inducted into the Delaware Sports Museum and Hall of Fame in 2024.

== Biography ==
Levine is Jewish. She began practicing gymnastics at age seven. She grew up in Wilmington, Delaware, and was a standout gymnast at Brandywine High School in Wilmington, being at age 15 the second Delaware resident to qualify for the National Elite Gymnastics Championships. She won five state championships at Brandywine and reached the U.S. Masters Championships, a step in qualifying for the Olympic Games, at age 16 in 1976.

Levine did not make the 1976 U.S. Olympic squad, but performed well enough to be chosen to represent the country at the 1976 Sanlam Cup. In 1977, she competed at the Maccabiah Games and won a gold medal in the balance beam exercise while being a bronze medalist in the all-around event. In 1978, Levine's senior year at Brandywine, she competed at the Eastern Regional tournament and won four events.

After having graduated from Brandywine, Levine began attending Pennsylvania State University in 1979 with a full athletic scholarship. She competed for the Penn State Nittany Lions gymnastics team and won both the regional championship and the AIAW national championship in the floor event as a freshman. She then won bronze in the floor event and was fourth in the all-around event at the 1980 national championship, did not compete in the 1981 competition due to injuries, and helped Penn State finish third in the NCAA finals in 1982. Levine was a finalist for the America Award as a senior in 1982, given to those who show the best "performance in gymnastics scholarship and leadership". She retired following the 1982 championships.

Levine moved to Winston-Salem, North Carolina, after her competitive career and opened a gymnastics school. She was married and has two children; her husband, Tim, predeceased her in 2006. Levine was inducted into the Delaware Sports Museum and Hall of Fame in 2024.
