= Debbie Windett =

American field hockey coach (born c.1954)

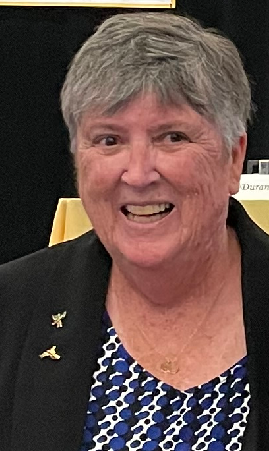
- Windett in 2026

Current position
- Title: Assistant coach
- Team: Cape Henlopen Vikings
- Conference: Henlopen Conference

Biographical details
- Born: c. 1954

Playing career

Field hockey
- 1972–1975: Bridgewater

Basketball
- 1972–1976: Bridgewater

Lacrosse
- 1974–1976: Bridgewater

Coaching career (HC unless noted)

Field hockey
- 1977–1997: Sussex Central HS
- 1998–2005: Caesar Rodney HS
- 2007–2011: St. Thomas More Academy
- 2012–present: Cape Henlopen HS (assistant/JV)

Lacrosse
- 1998–2005: Caesar Rodney HS
- 2010–2013: Wesley (DE)

Basketball
- Sussex Central HS

Soccer
- Sussex Central HS

Tennis
- c. 1977: Sussex Central HS

Deborah Ann West Windett (born c. 1954) is an American field hockey coach and former player. A coach at several high schools since 1977, she ranks among the top-20 in wins in high school field hockey history. Windett has also coached lacrosse, basketball, soccer and tennis. She was selected for induction to the Delaware Sports Museum and Hall of Fame in 2026.

== Biography ==
Windett attended Sussex Central High School in Delaware, where she was an honor student and competed in field hockey and basketball, winning All-Henlopen Conference honors. She graduated from Sussex Central as part of the class of 1972 and then began attending Bridgewater College in Virginia. Windett competed in three sports at Bridgewater: field hockey, basketball and lacrosse, and received a total of 11 varsity letters. She helped the basketball team to the 1976 state championship and served as co-captain of the field hockey team in 1975, helping them reach the USFHA-AIAW national tournament. In lacrosse, she was named an alternate to the All-Virginia team in 1974 and 1975 and was a primary selection in 1976, while serving as co-captain for the 1976 Bridgewater team that went 10–0–1. This was the first time the team had gone undefeated in school history. Windett graduated from Bridgewater as part of the class of 1976.

After Windett's graduation from college, she became a coach in 1977. She became the field hockey coach at her alma mater, Sussex Central, that year, succeeding Emily Seismore, who had held that position since the early 1960s and had been Windett's coach. She recalled to the Cape Gazette that as she was hired, "coach Seismore introduced me as the head coach and they started booing. Somebody yelled 'We hate you.' But I won them over." Windett led Sussex Central to a state tournament appearance in her first year there and ended up serving 21 years in the position, additionally serving as girls basketball coach for nine years, tennis coach for one year and the school's first girls soccer coach. While serving as tennis coach, she met her future husband Bill, who was an opposing coach at Dover Air Base; they married in 1978. At Sussex Central, Windett was also a physical education teacher.

In her time as Sussex Central's coach, Windett won 187 games across all sports. She left in 1998 to join Caesar Rodney High School, where she became field hockey coach and the first coach of the lacrosse team. Windett also served as chair of the school's physical education department. She led Caesar Rodney's field hockey team, which included her daughter Kate as a player, to a state title in 2004, then stepped down following a 15–1–2 record in 2005, "to be able to follow her daughter", who became a college athlete at the University of Richmond.

In 2007, Windett became field hockey coach at St. Thomas More Academy, leading them to an undefeated regular season record in 2008. She served five years as head coach there, and by the end of her stint there had become one of the top-20 winningest coaches in high school field hockey history, with a total of 344 wins. In 2010, she became lacrosse coach at Wesley College. Windett coached four years at Wesley and won 28 games, the best mark in team history. She also joined Cape Henlopen High School in 2012 as assistant coach to her daughter, Kate, the head coach. Windett also coaches Cape Henlopen's junior varsity field hockey team and since 2023 has been a volunteer lacrosse coach at Caesar Rodney. Through the 2025 season, she had won 11 state titles as assistant coach at Cape Henlopen.

Windett is active in the Delaware Interscholastic Athletic Association (DIAA); as of 2026, she had served on the organization's field hockey committee for 46 years, the girls lacrosse committee for 28 years with 25 years as chair, and the sportsmanship committee for six years. She was inducted into the Indian River School District Hall of Fame in 1995 and is an inductee to the Delaware Lacrosse Foundation Hall of Fame. She was inducted into the Bridgewater College Athletic Hall of Fame in 2004 and into Sussex Central's Hall of Fame in 2013. In 2026, she was selected for induction into the Delaware Sports Museum and Hall of Fame.
