= Kevin Tresolini =

American sportswriter (born 1958)

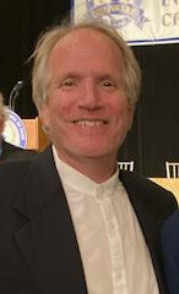
- Tresolini in 2024
- Born: September 18, 1958 (age 67)
- Education: University of Delaware
- Occupation: Sportswriter
- Years active: 1976–present
- Employer: The News Journal (1981–present)
- Awards: 14× Delaware Sportswriter of the Year; Delaware Baseball Hall of Fame (2014); Delaware Sports Museum and Hall of Fame (2024)

Kevin Tresolini (born September 18, 1958) is an American sportswriter. He has worked since 1981 with The News Journal and is one of the most decorated writers in Delaware history, being named the state's Sportswriter of the Year a record 14 times. He was inducted into the Delaware Sports Museum and Hall of Fame in 2024.

== Early life ==
Tresolini grew up in Bethlehem, Pennsylvania, and attended high school there. He started reading newspapers at age seven or eight, when his family subscribed to the Bethlehem Globe-Times, and soon after decided to become a sports journalist. He attended the University of Delaware (UD) starting in 1976 and graduated in 1980 with a degree in communications.

== Career ==
Tresolini started writing for the university's newspaper, The Review, as a freshman in 1976 and was named assistant sports editor after his first semester. He became the head sports editor as a sophomore and continued writing for the paper until his graduation. He worked an internship in the Delaware sports information department in 1980 but "missed writing and reporting for a paper".

Tresolini was hired by Wilmington, Delaware's daily newspaper, The News Journal in August 1981. He became the main high school reporter for the paper in 1986, remaining in the role through 1999, began covering the Delaware Fightin' Blue Hens men's basketball program in 1993, and started covering the Delaware football program in 1999, while also periodically writing about professional teams. He has been noted for having "built a reputation for care, sensitivity and detail", and has become the state's "preeminent sportswriter" in his over 40 years of service. Tresolini has covered six Olympic Games with Gannett, being chosen from among the organization's hundreds of newspapers.

Highly decorated, Tresolini, as of 2024, has been named the National Sports Media Association (NSMA)'s Delaware Sportswriter of the Year a record 14 times in five different decades. Only David Teel, of the Richmond Times-Dispatch, has ever received more state NSMA awards, with 15. Tresolini has also received six Top 10 writing awards from the Associated Press Sports Editors, which includes three top-three honors and first-place recognition for his 2013 story on the firing of Delaware football coach K. C. Keeler. Tresolini is additionally a recipient of a number of awards from the Maryland-Delaware-D.C. Press Association. He was inducted into the Delaware Baseball Hall of Fame in 2014. In 2024, he was selected for induction into the Delaware Sports Museum and Hall of Fame, the fifth journalist from The News Journal to ever receive the honor.

== Personal life ==
Tresolini is married and has two children.
