= Herb Slattery =

American football player (born 1945)

No. 65
- Position: Offensive lineman / linebacker

Personal information
- Born: March 29, 1945 (age 81); Wilmington, Delaware, U.S.
- Listed height: 6 ft 3 in (1.91 m)
- Listed weight: 245 lb (111 kg)

Career information
- High school: Archmere Academy (Claymont, Delaware)
- College: Delaware (1963–1966)
- NFL draft: 1967: 11th round, 264th overall pick

Career history
- New York Jets (1967)*; Waterbury Orbits (1967)
- * Offseason or practice squad member only

Awards and highlights
- First-team All-MAC (1965, 1966); First-team Little All-American (1966); First-team All-ECAC (1966); Co-MAC MVP (1966); ECAC Division II Player of the Year (1966); Delaware Athlete of the Year (1966); Delaware Sports Museum and Hall of Fame (1994)

Herbert Anthony Slattery (born March 29, 1945) is an American former professional football offensive lineman and linebacker. He played college football for the Delaware Fightin' Blue Hens and was selected in the 11th round of the 1967 NFL/AFL draft by the New York Jets. He was inducted into the Delaware Sports Museum and Hall of Fame in 1994.

== Early life ==
Slattery was born on March 29, 1945, in Wilmington, Delaware. He attended Archmere Academy in Claymont, where he was a standout athlete. He started all four years on the football team; as a freshman, he played fullback before switching to tackle as a sophomore, also being a top linebacker for his last two years. He was a two-time first-team all-state player and helped Archmere win the Independent Conference title three years in a row, with only two losses in his last three years. He was also a Catholic All-American as selected by The New World newspaper.

In addition to playing football, Slattery also participated in three other sports. He played for the Archmere basketball team and was all-conference while helping them win the conference championship as a senior. He played two years on the baseball team as a pitcher and shortstop, and then switched to track and field for two years. He was a top athlete in the shot put and set school records several times. Outside of Archmere, Slattery also spent two years with the Delaware Post No. 1 baseball team in the American Legion League.

Slattery was highly recruited and received offers from around 30 programs to play college football, including teams in the Big Ten Conference, Atlantic Coast Conference and Ivy League, as well as prominent independent school Notre Dame. He ultimately choose to stay local, committing to the Delaware Fightin' Blue Hens.

== College career ==
After not playing as a freshman in 1963, Slattery won a starting role as a lineman to begin the 1964 season, the first sophomore to do so on the line for the team since 1954. He remained a starter for his subsequent three years with the Fightin' Blue Hens and became one of the top linemen in school history; during his career, he was the only person for Delaware to start on both sides of the ball, being a standout tackle on offense and linebacker on defense. At times, he was also able to play defensive back. He was the heaviest player in the starting lineup – as well as the second-tallest – but was still regarded as one of the fastest members of the line, as well as, according to several coaches, "probably the team's best lineman–both offensively and defensively."

Slattery was selected twice as a first-team All-Middle Atlantic Conference (MAC) player, as a junior and senior. He had his best year as a senior in 1966, helping the Fightin' Blue Hens win the conference championship. He was chosen the Eastern College Athletic Conference (ECAC) Division II Player of the Year, co-MAC Most Valuable Player and first-team Little All-American by the Associated Press (AP), as well as a first-team All-ECAC player and an honorable mention All-East player by the AP. He was additionally named the co-winner of the Delaware Athlete of the Year award, along with Philadelphia Phillies pitcher Chris Short, as selected by the Wilmington Sportswriters Association. In his collegiate career, he averaged 15 tackles per game. He also spent several years as a member of the school's track and field team, competing in weight events, although he skipped participating as a senior to focus solely on football.

== Professional career ==
Slattery was selected by the New York Jets of the American Football League (AFL) in the 11th round, with the 274th overall pick, of the 1967 NFL/AFL draft. The Jets drafted him to play offensive guard. He joined the team for training camp on July 14, but was later placed on injured reserve with a knee injury and was waived on July 31. He later briefly joined the Waterbury Orbits of the Atlantic Coast Football League (ACFL) in September, although he is not known to have played in any games. His season ended when he joined the Maryland National Guard in October, serving at Fort Dix in New Jersey.

== Later life ==
Slattery was retired from football by the 1968 season, moving that year to Dover and working for the International Latex Corporation there. He later moved to Voorhees Township, New Jersey, where he was the senior vice president of G. E. Capital Mortgage Services as of 1991. By 1994, he held the same position for Kislak Mortgage Corp. in Fort Lauderdale, Florida. He married and had three children.

Slattery was inducted into the Delaware Sports Museum and Hall of Fame in 1994. He was ranked 52nd on The New Journal's 2019 list of the 100 greatest University of Delaware football players.
