= Matt Zabitka =

American sports journalist (1920–2009)

- Born: October 25, 1920; Chester, Pennsylvania, U.S.
- Died: May 29, 2009 (aged 88); Wilmington, Delaware, U.S.
- Occupation: Sportswriter
- Years active: c. 1934–2002
- Employer(s): Progressive Weekly (c. 1934); Various local newspapers (c. 1946–1952); Chester Times (1952–1962); The News Journal/The Morning News (1962–2002)
- Awards: 3× Delaware Sportswriter of the Year; Delaware Sports Museum and Hall of Fame (2000)

Matthew John Zabitka (October 25, 1920 – May 29, 2009) was an American sportswriter. He spent 40 years working with The News Journal and The Morning News.

== Biography ==
Zabitka was born on October 25, 1920, in Chester, Pennsylvania. He began his career at the age of 13, in c. 1934, when he noticed the local Progressive Weekly newspaper did not include a sports section. Zabitka, a sports fan, subsequently wrote a few articles on local sports titled "Sports of all sorts", and sent it to the paper's office. "I picked up the paper the next Thursday and there it was!" he said. The newspaper then hired him to write the column, paying him $5 per story.

Following his graduation from high school, Zabitka worked as a laborer at the Sun Shipyard & Drydock Co. before being drafted in the United States Navy to serve in World War II. While aboard the USS Randolph, he wrote a newspaper for his shipmates. Following his return to the United States, he wrote columns sponsored by local businesses, and convinced them to buy advertising space for his stories. He later worked for various local newspapers before getting hired by the Chester Times in 1952.

Ed Gebhart, a co-worker of Zabitka and writer for the Delco Times, later said,

I used to boast that the three of us (Zabitka, Gebhart, and Bob Finucane) covered 23 high schools in the county. That wasn't quite true. In reality, we had a four-man staff because Matt did enough writing for two reporters. I got to know Matt pretty well during the nine years we worked together. I never knew a harder worker in the newspaper business. We started the day at 6 a.m. back then, and Matt took all of five seconds to hang up his coat and start pounding his typewriter. We used to joke that Matt ordered typewriter ribbons by the caseload and that we had to keep a bucket of water at his desk in case the ribbon caught on fire. There never was a more prolific writer. If he had been paid by the word, he would have retired a millionaire. And none of that touch typing the computer keyboard wizards use today. With Matt, it was strictly "hunt and peck" – mostly peck – and you'd think he would eventually wear his two index fingers down to the first knuckle. Matt was a joy to work with. If he had a mean bone in his body, we never saw any indication of it. He laughed easily, seemed to know just about everyone in Delaware County and usually had a story to go with the name.

After ten years of working with the Chester Times, Zabitka left after a job offer with The News Journal by Al Cartwright. He said,

Al Cartwright called me out of the blue. He said he wanted to beef up coverage of sports in Delaware ... On the last Saturday of September I covered a high school football game for the Chester paper. The next day I went to work in Wilmington.

A 2002 article by The News Journal stated,

Early on, Cartwright asked him to write a bowling column for The News Journal. Soon, he was turning as many as four a week. Too much bowling, said the boss. Do a golf column instead. Soon, the golf columns were piling up. In fact, it has always been plain hard to shut Zabitka down ... Zabitka – "Zee" to co-workers who have listened to him conduct business during the 40 years he has been at this newspaper – has acquired about 7,500 bylines in The News Journal, by his count. That's just since 1994. He can only guess at the number of stories he wrote for the paper before computers made it easy to check – or of stories he wrote for what would become the Delaware County Daily Times, in Chester, before he was lured away by former News Journal sports editor Al Cartwright.

He became the paper's executive editor in 1999. He was inducted into the Delaware Sports Museum and Hall of Fame in 2000.

He spent 40 years regularly writing for The News Journal, finally retiring in 2002. Also in 2002 was the publishing of Matt Zabitka, Sports: 60 Years of Headlines and Deadlines, his biography written by Ed Okonowics and Jerry Rhodes. Though retired, he continued to periodically write articles over the next few years.

Zabitka died in his sleep on May 29, 2009, in Wilmington, Delaware, at the age of 88. Ed Gebhart, who he worked with for the Chester Times, said "I don't know what the situation is in heaven these days, but I do know this: If there's not a newspaper up there, with Matt on board, there soon will be."
