= Thomas Silicato =

- Born: April 13, 1946 (age 78); Wilmington, Delaware, United States

Teams
- Philadelphia Phillies; Cincinnati Reds; Milwaukee Brewers; Texas Rangers

Career highlights and awards
- Reading Phillies Hall of Fame (1995); Delaware Sports Hall of Fame (2004

Thomas Carmen Silicato (born April 13, 1946) is a former professional baseball player. He played a total of 13 seasons in the minor leagues, mostly in the Philadelphia Phillies organization (11 total), but also in the Cincinnati Reds, Milwaukee Brewers and Texas Rangers organizations. He is a member of the Reading Phillies Hall of Fame and the Delaware Sports Hall of Fame.

== Career ==
Silicato played all of his career (13 years) in the minor league system -- mostly with the Phillies -- where he made it to the highest level of Triple A for 4 seasons. Out of high school, and after deciding not to attend Delaware, he was signed as a non-drafted free agent in 1965 by then-Phils scout Ruly Carpenter whose family were the current owners of the Philadelphia Phillies. He played as a third baseman his first few years, then moved to second base for the remainder of his career. He also took part in Major League Baseball spring training in Clearwater, Florida for several years. During his career he was managed by several former major leaguers, including Dallas Green (another Delaware native) and Hall of Famer Jim Bunning. He holds several yearly records for several teams.

After his retirement in 1978, Silicato played several years in the popular Delaware Semi Pro league which always had several former minor and major league players. He currently coaches a men's 30-and-over baseball team in the league he formed in 2010, the Judy Johnson league, which plays games in and around Wilmington, Delaware.

== Awards ==
- Inducted into the Reading Phillies Hall of Fame in 1995
- Inducted into the Delaware Sports Hall of Fame in 2004

== Personal life ==
Silicato was born in Wilmington, Delaware to Carmen and Mary (Vilone) Silicato. His father was a custom home builder and mother a homemaker. He also has a younger sister Sandra who was born in 1949. He is married to June (Schenck) for 45 years and has two children, boys Thomas Jr and Joseph. He attended Salesianum School (1960–64) where he was a standout football, basketball and baseball player. He is also an avid golfer and bowler, having bowled two 300 games and a 299. Upon graduation he was strongly recruited by several NCAA schools including University of Delaware where football coach Tubby Raymond was the school's baseball head coach.
