= Frank Cephous =

American football player (born 1961)

No. 31
- Position: Running back

Personal information
- Born: July 4, 1961 (age 65); Philadelphia, Pennsylvania, U.S.
- Listed height: 5 ft 10 in (1.78 m)
- Listed weight: 205 lb (93 kg)

Career information
- High school: St. Mark's (Wilmington, Delaware)
- College: UCLA
- NFL draft: 1984: 11th round, 283rd overall pick

Career history
- New York Giants (1984); Minnesota Vikings (1986)*
- * Offseason or practice squad member only

Career NFL statistics
- Rushing yards: 2
- Rushing average: 0.7
- Return yards: 178
- Stats at Pro Football Reference

Frank Cephous (born July 4, 1961) is an American former professional football player who was a running back for the New York Giants of the National Football League (NFL) in 1984.

Cephous was born and raised in the State of Delaware, where he attended St. Mark's High School. Cephous played college football for the UCLA Bruins, playing a key role in their 1983 Rose Bowl and 1984 Rose Bowl victories. In the 1984 Rose Bowl, he led the team in rushing, with 89 yards in a dozen carries. Cephous was a four-year letterman with UCLA.

He was inducted into the Delaware Sports Hall of Fame in 2010.
