= Delaware Sports Museum and Hall of Fame =

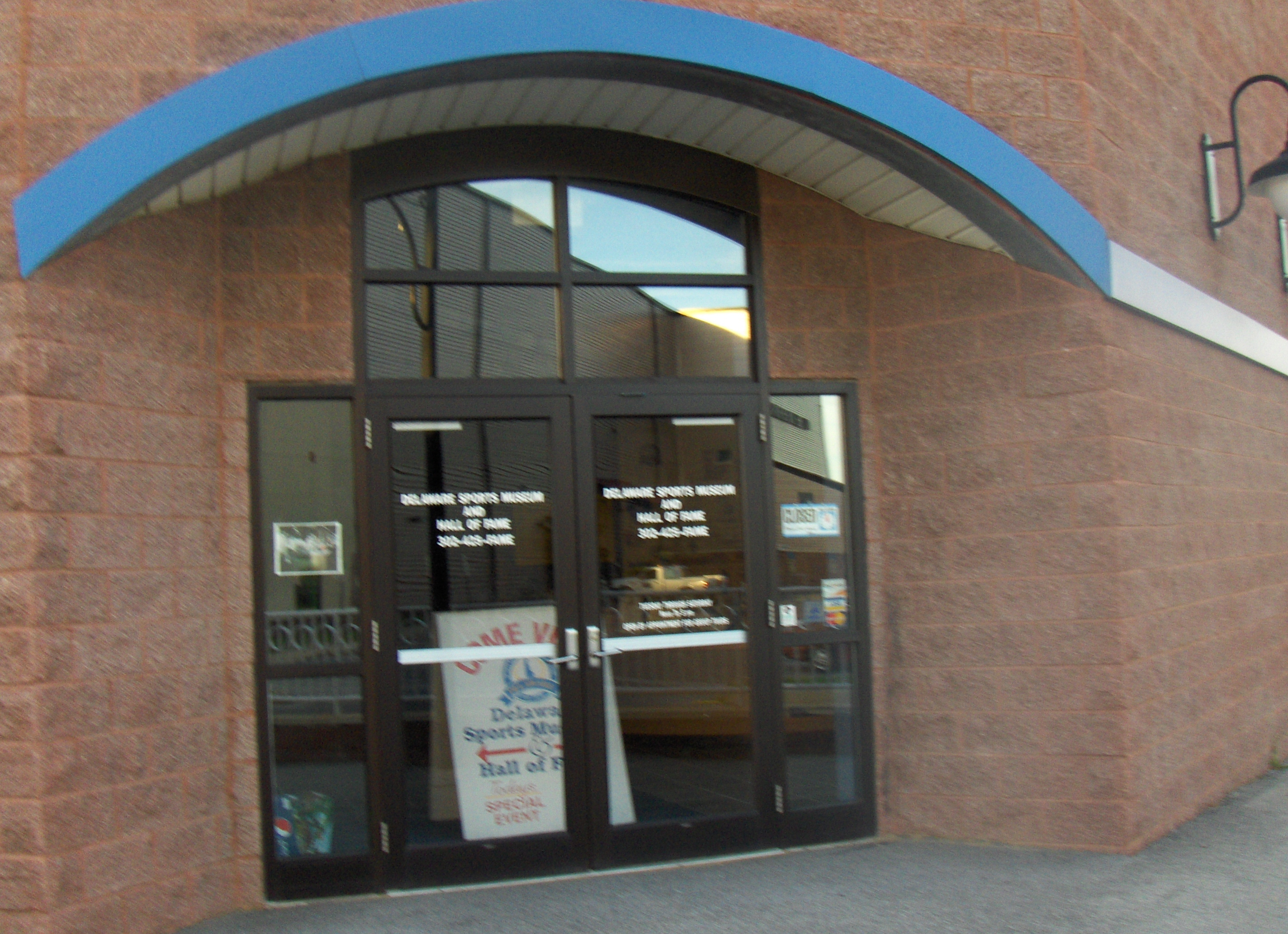
- Museum entrance

- Location in Delaware
- Established: 1976
- Location: 801 Shipyard Drive, Wilmington, Delaware, United States, 302.425.3263
- Coordinates: 39.7320°N 75.5638°W
- Type: Sports museum
- Executive director: Scott Selheimer
- President: Chuck Durante
- Public transit access: DART First State bus: 12
- Website: https://desports.org/

The Delaware Sports Museum and Hall of Fame was founded in 1976. Al Cartwright, who helped found it, was its first president and was inducted to its hall of fame in 1980. The current museum building was constructed in 1993.

The Delaware Sports Museum and Hall of Fame is a member of the International Sports Heritage Association.

The Delaware Sports Museum and Hall of Fame contains the Izzy Katzman Sports Library, named after a 1993 inductee.

== Gallery ==
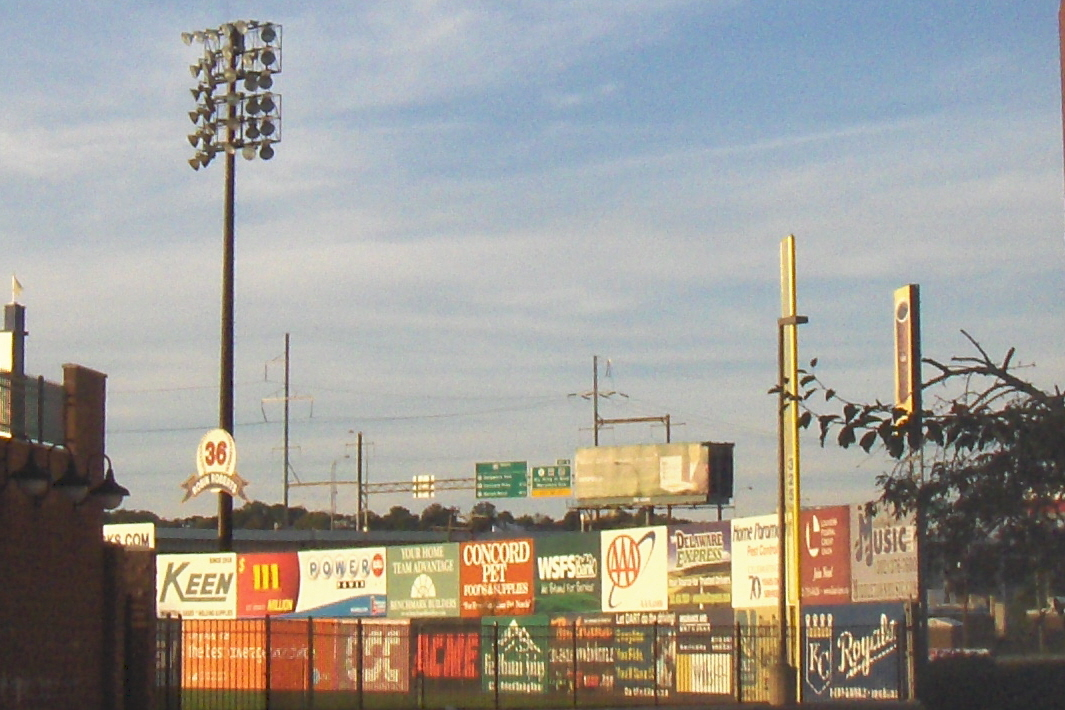
Backwall next to museum with I-95 in background.

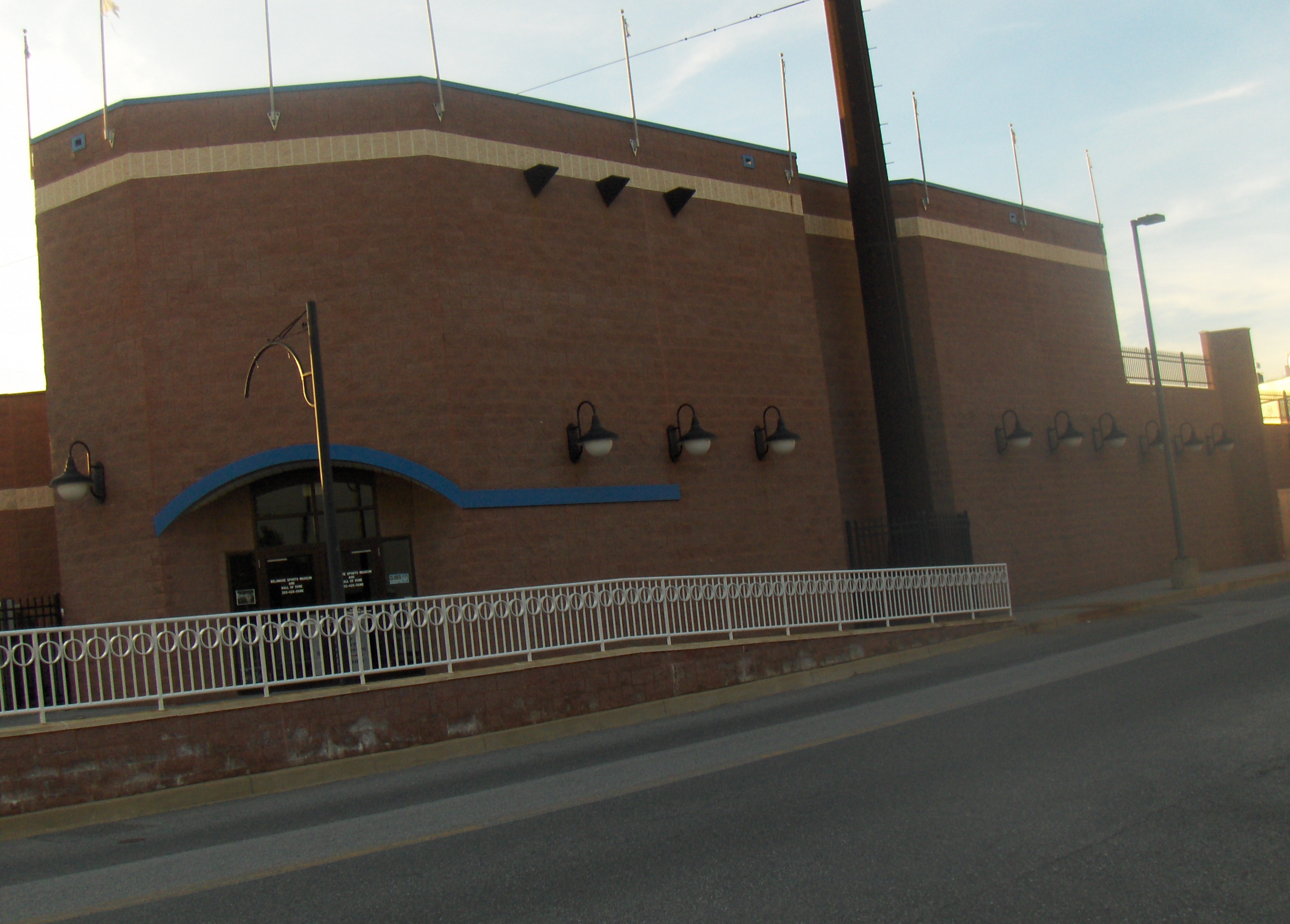
Museum building

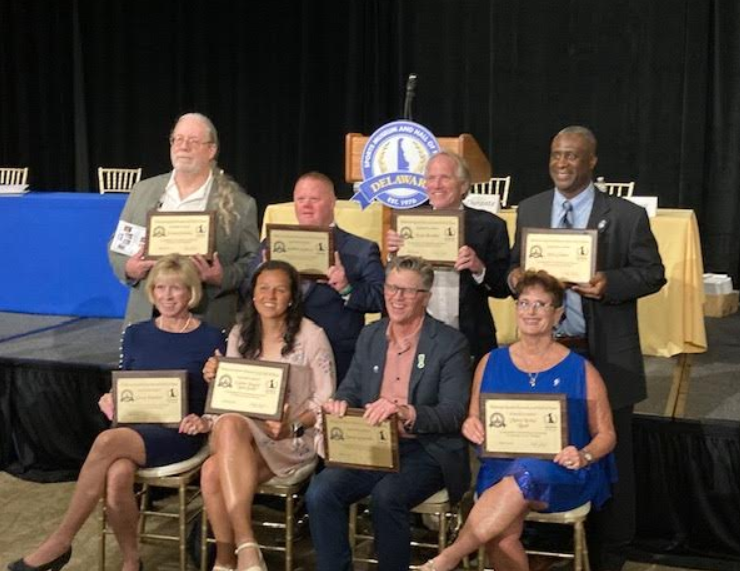
2024 inductees

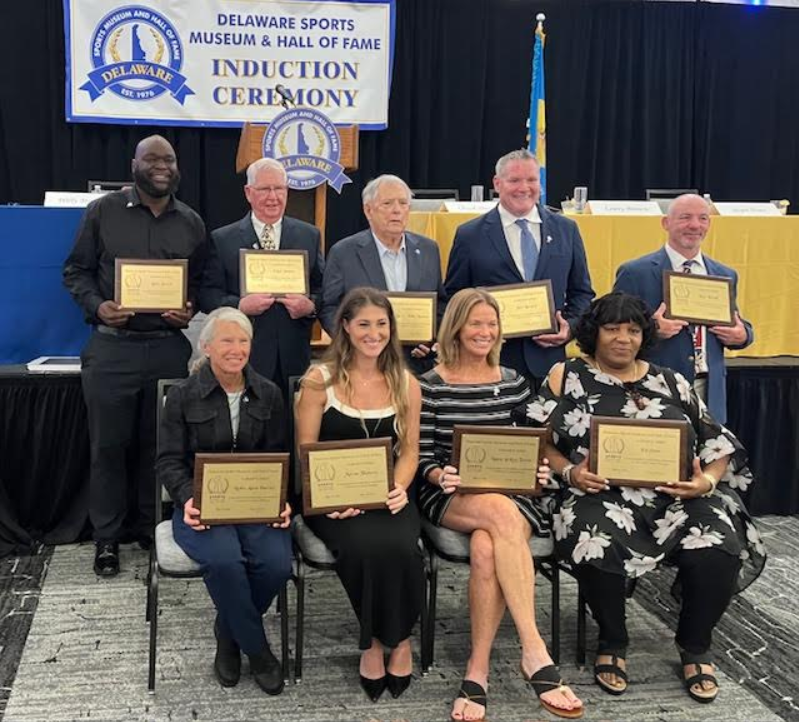
2025 inductees

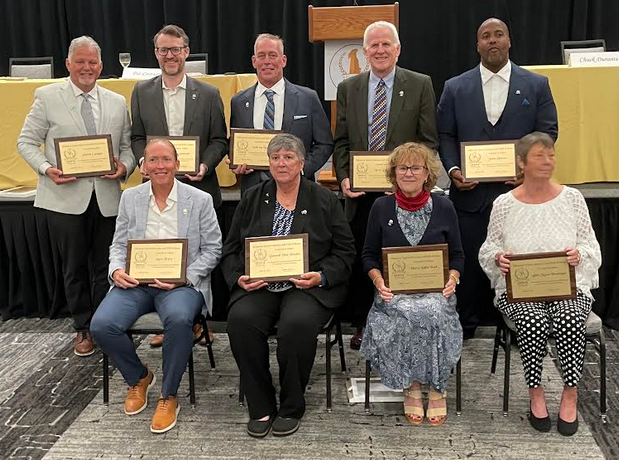
2026 inductees

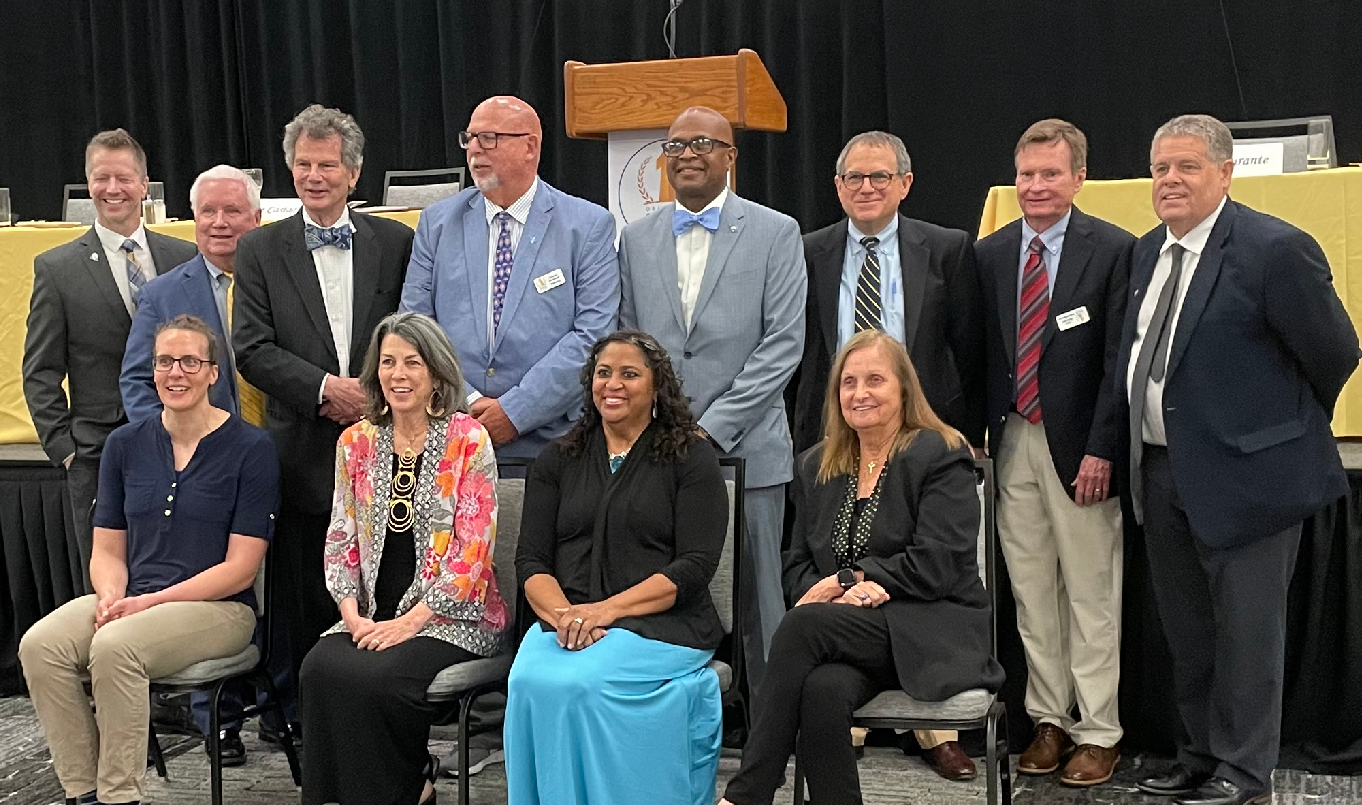
Staff and board of directors, 2026

== Inductees to the Delaware Sports Hall of Fame ==
A complete list of inductees to the Delaware Sports Hall of Fame is as follows:

- 1976: Jimmy Caras, William "Judy" Johnson, Marion Jessup MacLure, Ed Michaels, Creighton "Cotton" Miller, Edward "Porky" Oliver, Victor "Vic" Zwolak
- 1977: Ed Koffenberger, Bill McGowan, Frank Newlin, Nancy Sawin, Al Tribuani, Ron Waller, Vic Willis
- 1978: Bob Carpenter, Dave Douglas, J. Dallas Marvil, Dim Montero, Dave Nelson, Caleb "Tex" Warrington, Charles M. "Buck" Wharton
- 1979: William Cole, William du Pont Jr., John B. "Cap" Grier, John Joseph "Matchie" McMahon, Millard Naylor, George Schollenberger, Chris Short
- 1980: John J. "Johnny" Aiello, Walter "Huck" Betts, Al Cartwright, Gerald P. Doherty, II, Philip Bryan Field, Tom Hall, Madge "Bunny" Vosters
- 1981: Bernard "Bunny" Blaney, George V. "Shorty" Chalmers, Edward J. "Eddie" Cichocki, Matthew M. "Matt" Donohue, Pat Knight, Ralph Sasse, William A. "Bill" Skinner
- 1982: Frank Coveleski, Cliff Garvine, Charles A. "Chip" Marchlewicz-Marshall, Reverend James O'Neill, Frank Shakespeare, John Tosi
- 1983: John Cooper, George "Dallas" Green, Eddie Hazewski, Rosemary Miller, Jack Mulvena, Bill Murray, Jackie Pitts
- 1984: Paul Chadick, Nate Cloud, Billy Doherty, Cas Klosiewicz, Rea McGraw, Dave May, Al Neiger
- 1985: Lou Brooks, Al Crawford, Jack Crimian, Gerald P. "Doc" Doherty, Walter Hayes, Jim Krapf, Willard McConnell, Kevin Reilly, John Wilcutts, Walter Zablotny
- 1986: Charlie Givens, Conway Hayman, John Hickman, George Johnson, Vic Lichtenstein, Willie Roache, Doug Turley
- 1987: Ruly Carpenter, Bennie George, Grant Guthrie, Jim Hagan, Johnny Morris, Joe Pennock Pankowski, Harry Rawstrom
- 1988: Reverend John Birkenheuer, Carlton Elliott, George Estock, Robert Hoffman, Rita Justice, Russ Snowberger, Hymie Swartz
- 1989: Brandon "Brandy" Davis, Chris Dunn, Steve Gregg, Jennifer Franks Hilliard, Robert Kelley, Francis Lore, Gretchen Vosters Spruance
- 1990: Mike Brown, Dom "Quack" Carucci, Bill Chambers, Patsy Hahn, John "Cookie" Lucas, Herm Reitzes, Bob "Peanuts" Riley
- 1991: Bill Bruton, Forrest "Spook" Jacobs, Dave Johnson, Tom Mason, Pete Salvatore, Franny Walsh, Tim Wilson
- 1992: Harry Anderson, Joe Campbell, William V. "Dick" Hawke, Gary Hayman, Bill Passmore, Audie Kujala Showalter, Howard Wills
- 1993: John J. Brady, Izzy Katzman, Henry "Hank" Milligan, Harold "Tubby" Raymond, Milt Roberts, Steve Watson, John Wockenfuss
- 1994: Anthony Anderson, Bill Gerow, Steve McBride, Lou Moser, Art Redden, Wally Sezna, Herb Slattery, Al Sund, Randy White
- 1995: Anne Brooking, Robert F. Dowd, Sterling "Terl" Johnson, John Lesher, Renie Martin, Hans "Gus" Seaburg, Carol Thomson Slowik
- 1996: Dorothy Baker, Bert Cunningham, Scotty Duncan, Mike Hall, Rodney Lambert, C. Roy Rylander, Irvin "Ace" Taylor, Harold "Buck" Thompson
- 1997: Renee Baldwin, Laura Capodanno, Dan DiPace, Roger Franks, Mary Ann Hitchens, John Land, Frank Masley, Mike Meade, William A. "Bill" Thomson
- 1998: Bill Billings, Bill Collick, Bob Hannah, Felmon Motley, Lennell Shepherd Sr., Costen Shockley, Janet Smith, Leonard "Lenny" Sund
- 1999: Charlotte Kaufman Balick, Margaret Osborne duPont, Eugene "Buzzy" Gillen, Carl Hanford, Spencer Henry, Reverend Robert Kenney, Bubby Sadler
- 2000: Dale C. Farmer, Sr., Robert "Clyde" Farmer, Howard "Toots" Ferrell, C. Walter Kadel, Ron Ludington, Elizabeth "Betty" Richardson, Henry G. White, Jr., Matthew "Matt" Zabitka
- 2001: Rosemary "Roe" Bianchini, Norman Hanna, Dionna Harris, Jimmy Lewis, Robert "Robbie" Robinson, Earl Sheats, R. Benjamin Stansky, David Tiberi, Pat Williams
- 2002: Eddie Davis, George Frick, Melvin Joseph, Joseph Kane, Francis J. "Mike" McCall, Margaret "Missy" Meharg, Vicki Huber Rudawsky, Harold Trotter
- 2003: Herm Bastianelli, Roman "Ray" Ciesinski, Lawrence "Laudy" Damico, Julie Ann Dayton, Pat Ryan Ferguson, William Pheiffer, Bruce Reynolds, Kenneth D. Steers, Steve Taylor
- 2004: Martin Apostolico, Hal Bodley, Nicholas Bucci, A. J. English, Dr. Peter A. Grandell, Sue Manelski Kampert, William L. Kapa, Fred A. Mason, B. Gary Scott, Thomas Carmen Silicato, Barbara Viera
- 2005: C. Melvin Brooks, Sr., Susan Delaney-Scheetz, Jules "Ace" Hoffstein, Bob Mattson, Thomas Mees, Michael Neill, Joseph Purzycki, John Taylor, John Townsend, James F. Walls
- 2006: Robert Andrus, Bart Buckalew, Delino DeShields, Barbara Harris, Dennis Johnson, Richard Koffenberger, Leonard Leshem, James Wentworth, Irvin C. Wisniewski
- 2007: Bernard "Barney" Briggs, Jim Bundren, Bob Immediato, Rick McCall, Vincent "Winnie" Mayer, Lovett Purnell, Vinnie Scott, David Whitcraft, Val Whiting
- 2008: Lou Bender, Donald "Ducky" Carmichael, Jim Clapp, Ron Dickerson, Brenda Becker Ferris, Doris Callaway Fry, Jack Holloway, Aubrey Hudson, Mary Schilly Knisely, Jim "Whitey" Oddo, John W. Rollins, Sr., Jim Smith
- 2009: Edward "Punk" Callaway, Albert "Buddy" Clark, Jr., James "Jimmy" Flynn, Dave Hubinger, James "JJ" Johnson, Frank Kaminski, Clifton "Gator" Lewis, Mike McGlinchey, Tom Marshall, F. Tucker "Tuck" Mulrooney, Charles "Gene" Schaen, Dave Sysko
- 2010: Steve Bastianelli, Frank Cephous, Bob DeGroat, Helen Doherty, Ted Kempski, Laura Knorr Moliken, Jamie Natalie, Jim "Tuffy" Pabst, Terence Stansbury, Chester V. "Bud" Townsend, Mary Jane Weldin
- 2011: Sherman Dillard, Mary-de Mackie Hand, Dwayne Henry, Karen Kohn, Joe Lank, Matt Minker, William Moyer, Sheldon Thomas, Larry Wheeler, Doug White
- 2012: John "Jack" Baly, Reverend Joseph Beattie, Mike Clark, Terri Dendy, Jim Fischer, Albert Horne, J. Alvin "Slats" Laramore, Lori Van Sickle, John Walsh
- 2013: Jack Agnew, Ethel "Feffie" Barnhill, Charley Burns, Fillmore Clifton, Jeff Cooper, Monick Foote, Walter Dave Hurm, Rhondale Jones, Dr. Arthur "Art" Mayer, Luke Petitgout, Ukee Washington
- 2014: Ernie Anderson, Tom DeMatteis, Tom Hickman, Alvin Huey, Dario Mas, Derrick May, Judith O'Neill, Frank Shea, Ben Sirman, John Testa
- 2015: John W. "Bill" Crowther, Sarah Gause Flanders, Blaise Giroso, Joe Hemphill, Isadore "Izzy" Keil, Carrie Lingo, Bob Neylan, Robert C. Smith, Bob Tattersall, David Yates
- 2016: Sid Cassidy, Dick Cephas, Bob Colburn, Rich Gannon, Nancy Keiper, Laron Profit, Mark Romanczuk, Jeff Taylor, Jana Withrow, Wendy Zaharko
- 2017: Bob Behr, Kristin Mills Caldwell, John Coveleski, Mark Eaton, Vince Filliben, Scott Gregory, Lois Huggins, Kevin Mench, Butch Simpson, Jack Starr
- 2018: Jimmy Allen, Clinton Burke, Sarah Cashman Gersky, Tom Fort, Bunny Miller, Heidi Pearce, Larry Shenk, Penny Welsh, Dave Williams
- 2019: George Alderman, Dexter Boney, Bruce Frederick, Marianna Freeman, Montell Owens, Dan Rincon, Ann Igo Rizzo, Ian Snell, Margaret Varner Bloss
- 2020/2021: Mel Gardner, Jack Gregory, Jerry Kobasa, George Kosanovich, Tom Lemon, Art Madric, Charles Rayne, Lou Romanoli, Gary Smith, Tyresa Smith
- 2022: Bob Shillinglaw, Katelyn Falgowski, Gene Thompson, Joe Holloway, Juliet Bottorff, Khadijah Rushdan, Bob King, Devon Still, Dave Frederick
- 2023: Chris Anderson, Kwame Harris, Christina Hillman, Ruth Lajoie, Ray Peden, Ginger Smith, Joe Tiberi, Charles Wahlig, Paul Worrilow
- 2024: Caitlin Van Sickle, Cliff Brumbaugh (induction postponed (Note: Brumbaugh's induction was postponed due to him being unable to attend in 2024.)), Eric Cannon, Gary Chelosky, Cheryl Hamilton, Marcy Levine, David Raymond, Jonathan Stoklosa, Kevin Tresolini
- 2025: Robin Adair Harvey, Jake Bergey, Lenny Brown, Maxine Fluharty, Kurt Howell, Edgar Johnson, Laura LeRoy Travis, Willy Miranda, Ed Stone
- 2026: Patrick Castagno, Jamie Duncan, Andrew Gemmell, Bruce Gemmell, Bryheem Hancock, Harry Hoch, Adele Mears, Laura Taylor, Seth Van Neerden, Debbie Windett

== See also ==
- List of museums in Delaware
- Mascot Hall of Fame
