= Bill Skinner =

American javelin thrower

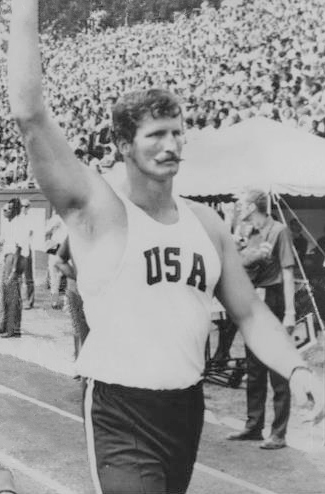
- Skinner in 1971

Personal information
- Born: December 27, 1939 Wilmington, DE
- Died: October 5, 2015 (aged 75) Georgetown, KY
- Height: 6 ft 6 1/2 in (199 cm)
- Weight: 240 lb (109 kg)

Sport
- Sport: Athletics
- Event: Javelin throw

Achievements and titles
- Personal best: 88.94 m (1970)
Medal record
Representing the United States
Pan American Games
| Silver medal – second place | 1971 Cali | Javelin throw |

Bill Skinner (December 27, 1939 – October 5, 2015) was an American javelin thrower. He held the national title in 1970 and 1971 and won a silver medal at the 1971 Pan American Games.

Born in Wilmington and raised in New Castle, Delaware, Skinner was trained as a metalsmith and welder, as were his father and grandfather. In January 1957, aged 17, he quit high school and enlisted to the U.S. Navy; he completed his service in spring 1961. After that he played semi-professional football with the Wilmington Clippers and trained in boxing and weightlifting before changing to javelin throw. By March 1968 he quit his welding job to attend the University of Tennessee and graduated in industrial education. In 1971, his refusal to shave his mustache led to his removal from the University of Tennessee track team, an infamous incident covered by Sports Illustrated. He continued his javelin career throwing for the New York Athletic Club. In 1971 he captained the U.S. team at the Pan American Games. Later that year he received an elbow injury and was stabbed while trying to stop a bar fight in Knoxville; as a result he missed the 1972 Summer Olympics.

Skinner married in late 1962 and had a daughter. He divorced in 1970. The same year his younger brother, Jimmy, was killed in a car accident after returning from Vietnam. He remarried in 1971 and had two more daughters. After retiring from competitions, Skinner lived in Kentucky and worked for John Deere company. He was inducted into the Delaware Sports Hall of Fame in 1981, and into the Delaware Track and Field Hall of Fame in 1994. He was posthumously inducted into the Tennessee Athletics Hall of Fame in 2016 as part of the first class honoring male athletes. His likeness appears (uncredited) on the side of the original arcade version of the Konami Track & Field video game. He died of pancreatic cancer aged 75.
