= Bob Andrus =

American football player and coach (1925–2015)

Biographical details
- Born: March 26, 1925; Duquesne, Pennsylvania
- Died: November 9, 2015 (aged 90)
- Education: Mansfield University

Playing career
- 1947: Maryland

Coaching career (HC unless noted)
- 1967–1987: Wesley (DE)

Head coaching record
- Overall: 97–98–3 (combined JUCO and Division III record)

Accomplishments and honors

Awards
- Delaware Sports Hall of Fame (2006)

Robert George Andrus (March 26, 1925 – November 9, 2015) was an American football coach. He was the head football coach at the Wesley College in Dover, Delaware from 1967 to 1986.

Andrus played a significant role in transitioning Wesley from a junior college team to a 4–year NCAA Division III program. A native of Duquesne, Pennsylvania, he played on the 1947 Maryland Terrapins football team that competed in the 1948 Gator Bowl.

Andrus was inducted into the Delaware Sports Hall of Fame in 2006.

== Head coaching record ==
=== College ===
Year	Team	Overall	Conference	Standing	Bowl/playoffs
Wesley Wolverines (Junior College) (1967–1985)
Wesley (junior college):		97–81–3			
Wesley Wolverines (Division III Independent) (1986–1987)
1986	Wesley	0–8			
1987	Wesley	0–9			
Wesley (NCAA Division III):		0–17			
Total:		97–98–3			
National championship Conference title Conference division title or championship game berth
