= Seaford School District =

School district in Delaware, United States

Seaford School District is a public school district situated in Sussex County in southern Delaware. The district encompasses a six-mile radius from the center of Seaford, and serves more than 3,200 students as of 2024.

Its attendance area includes Seaford, Blades, a small portion of Bridgeville, and their outlying neighborhoods, as well as Concord, Middleford, and Woodland.

== History ==
The Seaford Special School District was reorganized into the Seaford School District on July 1, 1969.

== Schools ==
High schools

- Seaford High School

Middle schools

- Seaford Middle School

Elementary schools

- Blades Elementary School
- Douglass (Frederick) Elementary School
- Seaford Central Elementary School
- West Seaford Elementary School
