= Steve Taylor (politician) =

American politician

Steven Taylor

Member of the Delaware House of Representatives from the 21st district
- In office 1984–1995
- Preceded by: Vincent P. Meconi
- Succeeded by: Pamela Maier

Personal details
- Born: February 9, 1956 Newark, Delaware, U.S.
- Party: Republican
- Education: University of Delaware
- Profession: Baseball Player, Politician

Steven Craig Taylor (born February 9, 1956) is a former minor league baseball player and Delaware politician.

A native of Newark, Delaware, Taylor played baseball for the University of Delaware. In 1976, he played collegiate summer baseball with the Chatham A's of the Cape Cod Baseball League and was named a league all-star. He was then drafted by the New York Yankees in the first round of the 1977 MLB draft, a first for a player born in the state of Delaware. Taylor then played for the Columbus Clippers until he had an arm injury that removed him from baseball.

He then moved back to Delaware. He was then involved in banking. He was elected to the Delaware House of Representatives in 1984. He was also a longtime supporter of bringing a minor league baseball team to Delaware and worked tirelessly to accomplish this goal. His efforts played a part in the creation of Frawley Stadium.

Taylor is a member of the Church of Jesus Christ of Latter-day Saints.

Taylor was inducted into the University of Delaware Hall of Fame in 1999 and the Delaware Sports Museum and Hall of Fame in 2003.
