= Millard Naylor =

American football coach (1901–1979)

- Naylor in a 1951 illustration

Biographical details
- Born: December 19, 1901; Wilmington, Delaware, U.S.
- Died: April 16, 1979 (aged 77); Wilmington, Delaware, U.S.

Playing career

Football
- 1920–1923: Lincoln

Baseball
- late 1910s: Wilmington Giants
- c. 1920: Wilmington Black Sox
- 1920–1923: Lincoln
- Positions: Center, fullback (football); Second baseman, shortstop (baseball)

Coaching career (HC unless noted)

Football
- 1926–1957: Howard HS (DE)

Baseball
- ?: Howard HS (DE)

Basketball
- ?: Howard HS (DE)

Track and field
- ?: Howard HS (DE)

Administrative career (AD unless noted)
- c. 1920: Wilmington Black Sox (BM)
- 1958–1960: Howard HS (DE)

Accomplishments and honors

Awards
- Delaware Sports Museum and Hall of Fame (1979)

Millard Albert Naylor (December 19, 1901 – April 16, 1979) was an American sports coach. He had a 32-season stint as football coach at Howard High School in Wilmington, Delaware, and was inducted into the Delaware Sports Museum and Hall of Fame in 1979.

== Early life ==
Naylor was born on December 19, 1901, in Wilmington, Delaware. He attended Howard High School in Wilmington, graduating in 1920. Howard had no athletic program at the time, and Naylor played baseball as a second baseman and shortstop for the local Wilmington Giants and Wilmington Black Sox. With the Black Sox, he also served as business manager in addition to playing.

Naylor began attending Lincoln University in Pennsylvania in 1920, where he played football and baseball for four years. In football, he began as a center before switching to fullback as a sophomore, starting in the position for his last three seasons; as a freshman, he was coached by the legendary Fritz Pollard. He graduated from Lincoln in 1924 with a bachelor's degree.

Naylor received the nickname "Steamy" because he "would run like a steam engine wherever he would go."

== Career ==
In 1925, Naylor was a teacher at the Booker T. Washington School. The following year, he returned to Howard High School as a teacher and created the football program. He went on to coach football, baseball, basketball and track and field. When he started the team, they had no equipment, money, or even a football; Naylor was able to get a used football and some equipment from the University of Delaware. For the first four years, the same football was used by the team, which Naylor took home every Thursday to polish. His players had to go to the shoemaker "every night to have their equipment sewn to keep it from falling apart." Until 1945, the team played out-of-state road games due to them being unable to play the white teams in Delaware's segregated school system.

Naylor ultimately served as a coach at Howard for 32 seasons – from 1926 to 1957, including the first 14 seasons without pay. He was known as the state's "dean of coaching" and was the longest-tenured coach in the state by his retirement following the 1957 season. His overall record as football coach was 132–91–24, including 22 teams with winning records, two undefeated seasons (1926 and 1939) and six championships; Howard was the 1933 South Atlantic Conference champion, 1939, 1940 and 1941 North Division champions, 1948 city champions, 1952 city champions and 1952 county champions. He coached many notable athletes and had a "legacy of outstanding players". He remained a teacher and served as Howard's athletic director for three years after his retirement as football coach.

== Later life and family ==
Naylor worked for the Latin American Drug Store in Wilmington after his retirement from Howard. He married and had at least seven children.

== Death and legacy ==
Naylor was selected to the Delaware Sports Museum and Hall of Fame as part of the hall's fourth class in 1979. He died on April 16, 1979, the day of his induction, at the age of 77. He later was posthumously inducted into the Delaware Afro-American Sports Hall of Fame in 2000, as part of the second class. A youth football league based in Wilmington was named in his honor, and his Howard High School football wins record stood until 2019.
