= Al Cartwright =

American sportswriter

- Born: June 20, 1917; Camden, New Jersey, US
- Died: May 10, 2015 (aged 97); Fredericksburg, Virginia, US
- Education: Reading High School (PA)
- Occupation: Sportswriter
- Years active: 1932–1983
- Employer(s): The Reading Times (1932–1943); The Dayton Herald (1943); The Philadelphia Record (1945–1947); The Evening Journal, The Morning News, and The News Journal (1947–1968, 1971–1983); Philadelphia Phillies publicity department (1969–1970)
- Awards: National Headliners Club "most consistently outstanding" sports columnist (1950); Delaware Sports Museum and Hall of Fame (1980)

Albert Thomas Cartwright (June 20, 1917 – May 10, 2015) was an American sportswriter. He spent 1947 to 1968, then 1971 to 1983, working with The News Journal and its predecessors, winning awards for his "A La Carte" columns.

== Sportswriting career ==
He started his career at the age of 15, writing articles without pay for The Reading Times. Following his graduation from Reading High School (Pennsylvania) in 1935, Cartwright was hired by The Reading Times as a paid staff member. Cartwright worked with The Times until 1943, when he went to The Dayton Herald as an assistant sports editor. He worked seven months with Dayton until entering the Navy in World War II. While in the Navy, he served in the public relations office at the United States Naval Training Center Bainbridge in Maryland. After sixteen months, he was discharged. He was subsequently hired by The Philadelphia Record in 1945. When it went out of business in 1947, he was then hired by The Evening Journal. He was widely known for his "humor, stylish prose, and diligent reporting", having multiple stories appear in the annual "Best Sports Stories" publications. Cartwright founded the Delaware (then Wilmington) Sportswriters & Broadcasters Association in 1949. In 1950, Cartwright was awarded the National Headliners Club award as the nation's "most consistently outstanding" sports columnist. He was given the task of journalist for The Morning News in 1963, when the staffs of The Evening Journal/The News Journal merged. In 1969, he was hired by Philadelphia Phillies publicity department, spending two years there. He returned to The News Journal in 1971. He along with Ken Nigro of The Baltimore Sun were the only two sports journalists to travel with the Baltimore Orioles on its tour of Japan later that year in October and November. In 1974, he published A La Carte: The Best of Al Cartwright, a book containing his varied writings. He helped found the Delaware Sports Museum and Hall of Fame in 1976, serving as its first president before being an inductee to its hall of fame in 1980. He retired from The News Journal in 1983.

For Delawareans, one of the most popular attractions of his columns was the fictional character Blewynn Gold, the only Delaware football fan who, "had seen them all". He would frequently write game recaps through the eyes of Gold, an alleged 1890 graduate of University of Delaware.

== Later life ==
He periodically wrote for The News Journal following his retirement in 1983, even bringing back Blewynn Gold in 1989.

At the age of 89 he moved to Virginia to be closer to his family. He died in Fredericksburg, Virginia on May 10, 2015, at the age of 97. Steve Kelley, who spent more than 30 years with The Seattle Times said "Al Cartwright was one of my heroes. He was a huge reason I got into the business. His Blewynn Gold columns on the Mondays after Delaware football games were classics." Tubby Raymond, whose 1980 biography was authored by Cartwright, said "I always felt Al was ahead of the world. Everybody loved him."
