= Herm Reitzes =

American sportscaster (1903–1987)

- Born: 1903; New York, U.S.
- Died: June 12, 1987 (aged 84); Tilton Terrace, Delaware, U.S.
- Education: University of Delaware
- Occupation: Sportscaster
- Years active: 1922–1950s
- Awards: Herm Reitzes Award (1983) Coaching career

Playing career

Football
- c. 1921: Delaware freshman
- c. 1922: Delaware sophomore

Coaching career (HC unless noted)

Football
- 1925–1926: Millsboro HS

Basketball
- 1925–1926: Millsboro HS

Herman Reitzes (1903 – June 12, 1987) was an American sportscaster. He was a radio announcer at WDEL from the 1920s to the 1950s and was the play-by-play commentator for the Delaware Fightin' Blue Hens football, Wilmington Blue Rocks, and Wilmington Clippers. He was posthumously inducted into the Delaware Sports Museum and Hall of Fame in 1990.

== Biography ==
"He didn't have a great voice, but it was something special. He took me under his wing. I was a young guy coming out of Temple University in 1950 and he was so helpful. I still remember him saying to me after a show, 'Good work, kid.' Herm was more than just a sports announcer. He was as honest as you could be with a heart of gold."

— George Frick in 1990,

Reitzes was born in 1903 in New York. He was Jewish. He grew up in Philadelphia, Pennsylvania, and attended Wilmington High School. Afterwards Reitzes played freshman and sophomore college football at Delaware College (now known as the University of Delaware). He graduated from college in 1925. In the 1925–26 school year, Reitzes served as football coach, men's basketball coach, women's basketball coach and a teacher at Millsboro High School. He also sold insurance.

In 1922, Reitzes was hired by WDEL radio station. He first appeared on a nightly sports talk show. He later became the play-by-play announcer for the Delaware Fightin' Blue Hens football team, for which he was best known. "Those where the days when they (Delaware) used to play schools like Susquehanna, Lebanon Valley, Hampden–Sydney, and PMC (Widener)," he said. "If they got 500 people it was a helluva crowd." He announced from a small tower, with only enough room for one person, that was constructed on two-by-fours. The Delaware stadium was located next to a railroad, and his announcing partner Dick Aydelotte said that "Everytime a train went by, which was often, Herm would be drowned out. You couldn't hear a thing. Sometimes when a long freight, like 100 cars would roll by. Herm would be off the air for quite a time. After the train passed, Herm would get back on, apologize to the listeners, and recount the action that had transpired while the freight train was going by."

In addition to announcing the University of Delaware football games, Reitzes was also the radio announcer for the Wilmington Clippers professional football team, the public address announcer for the Wilmington Blue Rocks in baseball, and the radio announcer for the annual P. S. Dupont–Wilmington High School Thanksgiving football game.

Reitzes was also well-known for his "Sports Parade" radio program, which aired daily from 6:05 to 6:15 p.m., featuring "everything from the national sports to the local sandlots."

Reitzes left announcing in the 1950s. Afterwards, he was a fan of P. S. Dupont High School basketball.

In 1983, the Herm Reitzes Award was created, to be given to those who have "outstanding contribution[s] to athletics and sports in Delaware." Reitzes was the first recipient.

Reitzes died on June 12, 1987, in Tilton Terrace, Delaware, from heart failure. He was 84 at the time of his death. He was posthumously inducted into the Delaware Sports Museum and Hall of Fame in 1990.
