= The News Journal =

Newspaper from Wilmington, Delaware

- Front page from 2010
- Type: Daily newspaper
- Format: Broadsheet
- Owner: USA Today Co.
- Publisher: Tom Donovan
- Editor: Michael Feeley
- Founded: 1866 (as the Daily Commercial)
- Headquarters: 950 West Basin Road; New Castle, Delaware 19720; United States
- Circulation: 26,550 Daily; 39,375 Sunday
- ISSN: 1042-4121
- OCLC number: 16073699
- Website: delawareonline.com

The News Journal is a daily newspaper in Wilmington, Delaware. It is headquartered in unincorporated New Castle County, Delaware, near New Castle, and is owned by Gannett.

== History ==
The ancestry of the News Journal reflects the mergers of several newspapers. It is dated to Oct. 1, 1866, when Howard M. Jenkins and Wilmer Atkinson started the afternoon publication Daily Commercial. In 1877, that paper was absorbed into a rival, the Every Evening, founded by Georgetown native William T. Croasdale.

The Evening Journal, later owned by the Du Pont family, was founded in 1888 as a competitor to The Every Evening. The two papers merged in 1933.

Another predecessor to the News Journal was the Morning Herald, founded in 1876 by Philadelphia lawyer John O'Byrne. It later became the Daily Morning News, bought by Alfred I. Du Pont in 1911.

For most of the 20th century, the Du Pont family owned these two Delaware newspapers, The Morning News and The Evening Journal. Ownership of both papers was consolidated in 1919 when feuding factions of the family reconciled, forming the News Journal Company.

DuPont decided to sell The News Journal Company in 1978. Gannett won the bidding war, beating the Hearst Corporation and The Washington Post Company. Gannett paid $60 million for the two Delaware papers and merged them in 1989 to form one paper, The News Journal.

In 2010, The News Journal Company became The News Journal Media Group in an effort to collectively identify their extensive product portfolio of print, digital, video and new media.

2019 circulation statements showed The News Journal's daily circulation at 26,550 (Issue Date: August 21, 2019) and Sunday circulation at 39,375 (Issue Date: August 25, 2019).

In 2020, the News Journal took over the six weekly newspapers owned by Gatehouse Media in a merger whereby Gatehouse bought Gannett and renamed itself Gannett. The content of the six weeklies and websites (which redirect to the News Journal’s Delaware Online) now consists mainly of material generated by the News Journal and USA Today. The weeklies’ Facebook pages are outdated, unstaffed and rarely updated, if at all, since 2020.

The Dover Post, Milford Beacon, Sussex Countian/Living, Middletown Transcript, Smyrna-Clayton Sun Times and Hockessin Community News no longer exist as independent publications.

== Coverage area ==
The News Journal covers New Castle County most in-depth, but also offers considerable coverage of the Delaware General Assembly and the Delaware beaches. The paper also offers limited coverage of northeast Maryland and southeast Pennsylvania, mostly by means of short news briefs. The paper publishes national and international articles from wire services.

== Sections ==
Regular sections

- News
- Local & Business
- Sports
- Life
- Classifieds

Special sections

- Innovate Delaware
- Health (Tuesdays)
- Crossroads (Thursdays) – contains news about schools and other local, human-interest features. High schools in Delaware each pick a student to write a short report about the happenings at their school for Crossroads. In April 2007, The News Journal began reprinting articles from local high school newspapers in the Crossroads section.
- 55 Hours (Fridays) – movie reviews, food reviews, and info about events occurring in the 55 hours of the weekend (and beyond)
- Auto (Saturdays)
- Sunday Life

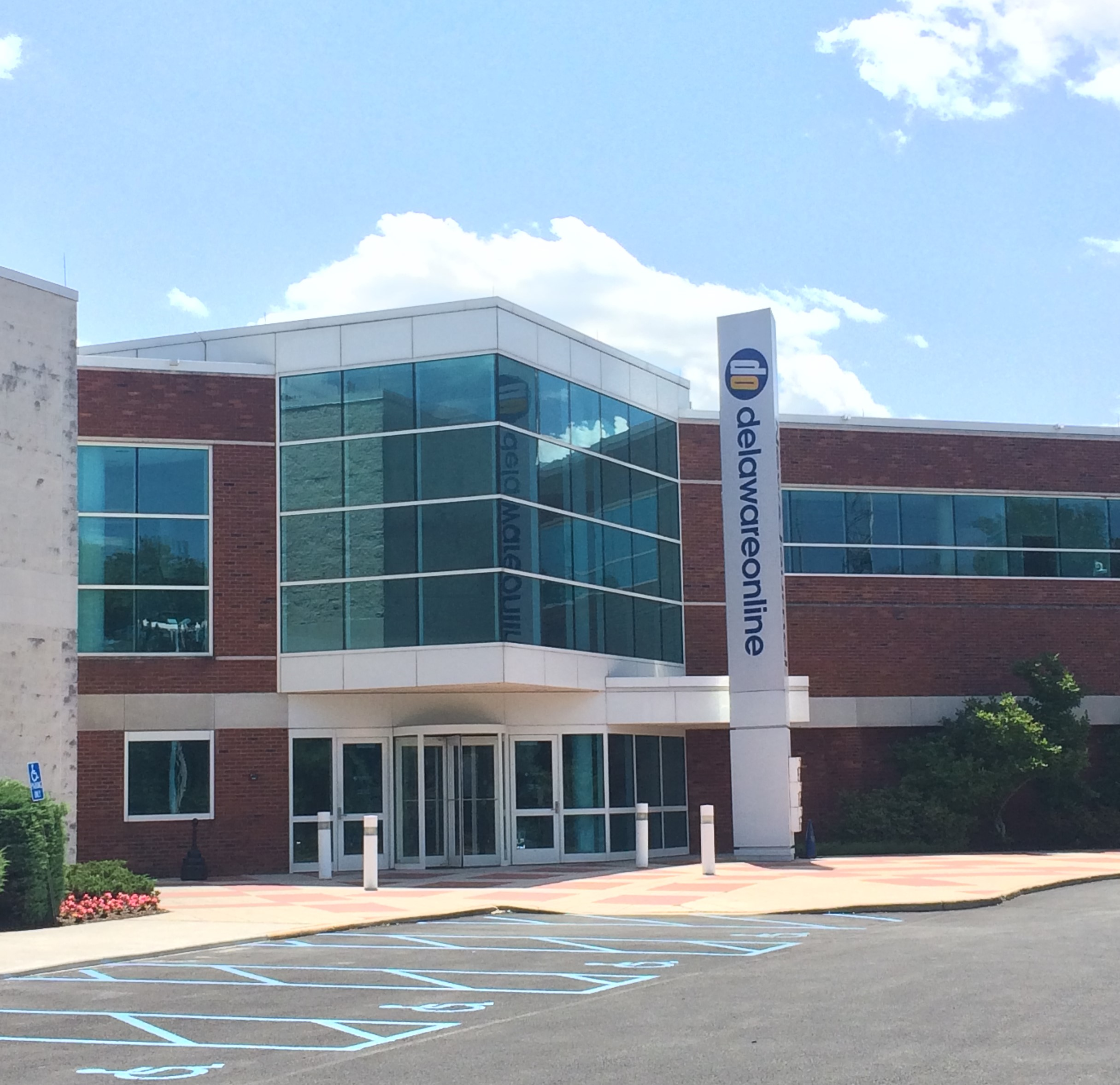
The News Journal headquarters in New Castle County, Delaware

== Website and video ==
The News Journal Media Group entered the Internet age in the late 1990s with the launch of Delaware Online, a website with an online edition of all local content in the paper, as well as job listings and classified ads. The paper began offering an online news update weekdays at 4:30 pm. The once-daily update has evolved into as-it-happens online news coverage that often results in a couple of dozen news updates per day.

DelawareOnline.com was the first newspaper in the country to offer a morning and afternoon online newscast, with anchor Patty Petite.

DelawareOnline.com was cited in a 2008 Wilkerson and Associates study as the site Delawareans visit first for news and entertainment. More than one million unique visitors are recorded each month. As of July 2020, the Delaware Online Facebook page had more than 200,000 followers.

== Notable reporters ==
- Rod Beaton – sports journalist c. 1977 – c. 1982
- Al Cartwright – Cartwright wrote sports columns for The News Journal and its predecessors from 1947 to 1968, and 1971–1983.
- Kevin Fleming – photographer
- Bill Fleischman (1966 to 1969)
- Haynes Johnson - Famed national reporter, columnist, and later, professor, Johnson had his reporting debut with The News Journal in 1956.
- Izzy Katzman – Katzman was a sports editor from 1950 to 1986.
- Norman Lockman – Lockman served as managing editor of The News Journal from 1984 to 1991. After that, he became a member of the editorial board and wrote a regular column in the paper. Before joining The News Journal, Lockman won a Pulitzer Prize for a series of articles on race relations he co-wrote for The Boston Globe. Suffering from Lou Gehrig's disease, Lockman wrote his final column in late 2004. He died the following April.
- Matt Zabitka – Zabitka served as a sports editor from 1962 to 2002.
