= List of high schools in Delaware =

This is a complete list of high schools in the U.S. state of Delaware.

== Public schools ==
=== New Castle County ===
School name	Location	Grade range	District	2019-2020 enrollment
Alexis I. duPont High School	Greenville	9-12	Red Clay Consolidated School District	807
Appoquinimink High School	Middletown	9-12	Appoquinimink School District	1,697
Brandywine High School	Talleys Corner	9-12	Brandywine School District	839
Brennen School	Brookside	K-12	Christina School District	413
Cab Calloway School of the Arts	Westmoreland	6-12	Red Clay Consolidated School District	937
Charter School of Wilmington	Wilmington	9-12	Red Clay Consolidated School District	971
Christiana High School	Newark	6-12	Christina School District	1,030
Christiana School District Virtual Academy	Wilmington	K-12	Christina School District	N/A
Concord High School	Brandywine	9-12	Brandywine School District	1,084
Conrad Schools of Science	Wilmington	6-12	Red Clay Consolidated School District	1,179
Delaware Military Academy	Wilmington	9-12	Red Clay Consolidated School District	578
Delaware School for the Deaf Secondary	Brookside	PK-12	Christina School District	108
Delcastle Technical High School	Wilmington	9-12	New Castle County Vocational-Technical School District	1,561
Douglass School	Wilmington	1-12	Christina School District	55
First State School	Wilmington	2-12	Red Clay Consolidated School District	22
Glasgow High School	Newark	9-12	Christina School District	717
Hodgson Vo-Tech High School	Glasgow	9-12	New Castle County Vocational-Technical School District	1,096
Howard High School	Wilmington		Wilmington School District	N/A (defunct)
Howard High School of Technology	Wilmington	9-12	New Castle County Vocational-Technical School District	835
James H. Groves Adult High School	Wilmington	adult education	Red Clay Consolidated School District	N/A
John Dickinson High School	Milltown	6-12	Red Clay Consolidated School District	894
John G. Leach School	Collins Park	PK-12	Colonial School District	71
Meadowood Program	Newark	K-12	Red Clay Consolidated School District	140
Middletown High School	Middletown	8-12	Appoquinimink School District	1,776
MOT Charter High School	Middletown	K-12		1,375
Mount Pleasant High School	Wilmington	9-12	Brandywine School District	1,062
Networks School for Employability Skills	Newark	9-12	Christina School District	N/A
Newark Charter School	Newark	K-12		2,412
Newark High School	Newark	9-12	Christina School District	1,059
Odessa High School	Townsend	9-12	Appoquinimink School District	N/A
P. S. Dupont High School	Wilmington		Wilmington School District	N/A (defunct)
Sarah Pyle Academy for Academic Intensity	Wilmington	9-12	Christina School District	N/A
St. Georges Technical High School	Middletown	9-12	New Castle County Vocational-Technical School District	1,123
Thomas McKean High School	Wilmington	8-12	Red Clay Consolidated School District	920
The Wallace Wallin School	New Castle	6-12	Colonial School District	121
William Penn High School	New Castle	9-12	Colonial School District	2,271
Wilmington High School	Wilmington		Wilmington School District (1872–1979); Red Clay Consolidated School District (1979–1999)	N/A (defunct)

=== Kent County ===
School name	Location	Grade range	District	2019-2020 enrollment
Caesar Rodney High School	Camden Wyoming	9-12	Caesar Rodney School District	2,065
Dover High School	Dover	9-12	Capital School District	1,790
Early College High School at Del State	Dover	9-12		421
First State Military Academy	Clayton	9-12		452
John S. Charlton School	Dover	PK-12	Caesar Rodney School District	233
Kent County Community School	Dover	PK-12	Capital School District	258
Kent County Secondary Intensive Learning Center	Dover	6-12	Capital School District	108
Lake Forest High School	Felton	8-12	Lake Forest School District	840
Milford Senior High School	Milford	9-12	Milford School District	1,087
Polytech High School	Woodside	9-12	Polytech School District	1,192
Positive Outcomes Charter School	Camden	7-12		121
Smyrna High School	Smyrna	9-12	Smyrna School District	1,612

=== Sussex County ===
School name	Location	Grade range	District	2019-2020 enrollment
Cape Henlopen High School	Lewes	9-12	Cape Henlopen School District	1,506
Delmar Senior High School	Delmar	9-12	Delmar School District	635
G.W. Carver Educational Center	Frankford	4-12	Indian River School District	33
Howard T. Ennis School	Georgetown	PK-12	Indian River School District	138
Indian River High School	Frankford	9-12	Indian River School District	945
Indian River Intensive Learning Center	Selbyville	3-12	Indian River School District	142
Laurel Senior High School	Laurel	9-12	Laurel School District	626
Seaford Senior High School	Seaford	9-12	Seaford School District	826
Sussex Academy	Georgetown	K-12		858
Sussex Central High School	Georgetown	9-12	Indian River School District	1,803
Sussex Consortium	Lewes	PK-12	Cape Henlopen School District	360
Sussex Orthopedic Program	Seaford	PK-12	Seaford	48
Sussex Technical High School	Georgetown	9-12		1,241
Woodbridge High School	Bridgeville	9-12	Woodbridge School District	712

== Private schools ==
=== New Castle County ===
School name	Location	Grade range	Religious affiliation	Gender	2021 enrollment
Archmere Academy	Claymont	9-12	Catholic	co-educational	515
Aquinas Academy	Bear	K-12	Catholic	co-educational	85
Augustine Hills	Wilmington	6-12	non-religious	co-educational	N/A
Caravel Academy	Bear	PK-12	non-religious	co-educational	1,117
Centreville Layton School	Centreville	PK-12	non-religious	co-educational	102
Concord Christian Academy	Wilmington	PK-12	Baptist	co-educational	210
Delaware Valley Classical School	New Castle	K-12	Christianity	co-educational	152
Fairwinds Christian School	Bear	PK-12	Protestant	co-educational	262
Glasgow Christian Academy	Newark	PK-12	Christian	co-educational	250
High Road School of Delaware	Wilmington	3-12	non-religious	co-educational	23
Mount Sophia Academy	Newark	K-12	Christian	co-educational	160
The New School	Newark	K-12	non-religious	co-educational	26
Padua Academy	Wilmington	9-12	Catholic	all-girls	658
Red Lion Christian Academy	Bear	PK-12	Evangelical	co-educational	574
Salesianum School	Wilmington	9-12	Catholic	all-boys	1,034
Sanford School	Hockessin	PK-12	non-religious	co-educational	577
St. Andrew's School	Middletown	9-12	Episcopal	co-educational	319
St. Elizabeth School	Wilmington	PK-12	Catholic	co-educational	540
St. Mark's High School	Wilmington	9-12	Catholic	co-educational	605
The Tatnall School	Wilmington	PK-12	non-religious	co-educational	551
Tower Hill School	Wilmington	PK-12	non-religious	co-educational	815
Towle Institute	Hockessin	6-12	Christian	co-educational	157
Ursuline Academy	Wilmington	PK-12	Catholic	all-girls (6-12)	413
Wilmington Christian School	Hockessin	PK-12	Christian	co-educational	345
Wilmington Friends School	Wilmington	PK-12	Quakers	co-educational	699

=== Kent County ===
School name	Location	Grade range	Religious affiliation	Gender	2021 enrollment
Calvary Christian Academy	Dover	PK-12	Christian	co-educational	323
Capitol Baptist School	Dover	PK-12	Baptist	co-educational	38
High Road School of Delaware	Felton	5-12	non-religious	co-educational	23

=== Sussex County ===
School name	Location	Grade range	Religious affiliation	Gender	2021 enrollment
Delmarva Christian High School	Georgetown	9-12	Evangelical	co-educational	200
Geneva Academy	Lincoln	K-12	Classical Christian	co-educational	23
Greenwood Mennonite School	Greenwood	PK-12	Mennonite	co-educational	54

== Former schools ==
- Louis L. Redding Comprehensive High School

== See also ==
- List of school districts in Delaware
- Category:Defunct schools in Delaware
- Category:Defunct high schools in Delaware
