= Helen W. Anderson =

- Born: February 17, 1877; Tenleytown, Washington, D.C.
- Died: January 1, 1962 (aged 84); Landover Hills, Maryland
- Education: University of Delaware
- Known for: Activism
- Relatives: Mary Ann Shadd (cousin)

Helen Wormley Anderson (1877–1962) was an African-American suffragist.

== Early life ==
On February 17, 1877, Anderson was born to Adelaide Shadd Wormley, and William H. A. Wormley; a housewife and hotelier, respectively.

Helen grew up in Tenleytown, Washington, D.C., along Pierce Mill Road (modern-day Van Ness Avenue) in a Victorian country house.

In 1890, when Helen was thirteen years old, her mother died. Her father remarried in 1892, but the change in the family dynamics did not alter Helen's educational trajectory. Like her Wormley and Shadd relations, whose ranks included physicians, school teachers, and principals (her nephew Stanton Wormley later became president of Howard University), she benefited from an excellent education in the District's "colored" schools. She attended the famed "Colored High School" in Washington, D.C., at a time when the writer and feminist Anna J. Cooper was on the teaching staff.

After graduation, she accepted a teaching post at the Howard School in Wilmington, Delaware. She later advanced her schooling through summer courses at Harvard and New York University.

== Career ==
Her involvement in the woman suffrage movement occurred in conjunction with colleagues and political activists. Not long after beginning her career at the Howard School, Helen W. Anderson joined Edwina Kruse and Alice Baldwin in donating to the Sarah Ann White Home for Aged Colored Persons. In 1913, when Blanche Stubbs, her husband, Alice Dunbar, and other Wilmington African-American leaders with the support of a white advisory board, undertook a fund-raising effort designed to provide a permanent home for the Garrett Settlement House, Helen Anderson served on the fund-raising committee. The Settlement House was soon dedicated and incorporated.

== Death ==
Upon her death in 1962, she bequeathed her entire estate to her sisters Jessie A. Wormley and Miriam Wormley Lewis. Her remains were buried in the Trustees Section of the National Harmony Memorial Park in Maryland, the final resting place of many family members, including her mother's cousin Mary Ann Shadd Cary.

== See also ==
- Edwina Kruse
- Blanche Stubbs
