= Howard High School of Technology =

Location
- 401 E. 12th St; Wilmington, Delaware 19801; United States; 39°44′48″N 75°32′30″W

Information
- Type: Vo-tech public high school
- Established: 1928 (98 years ago)
- School district: New Castle County Vocational-Technical School District
- CEEB code: 080175
- Principal: Kyle Hill
- Teaching staff: 65.56 (FTE) (2023-2024)
- Grades: 9–12
- Enrollment: 902 (2023-2024)
- Student to teacher ratio: 13.76 (2023-2024)
- Campus type: Urban
- Colors: Blue and white
- Athletics conference: Blue Hen Conference - Flight B
- Mascot: Wildcats
- Website: howard.nccvt.k12.de.us
- Howard High School
- U.S. National Register of Historic Places
- U.S. National Historic Landmark
- U.S. Historic district – Contributing property
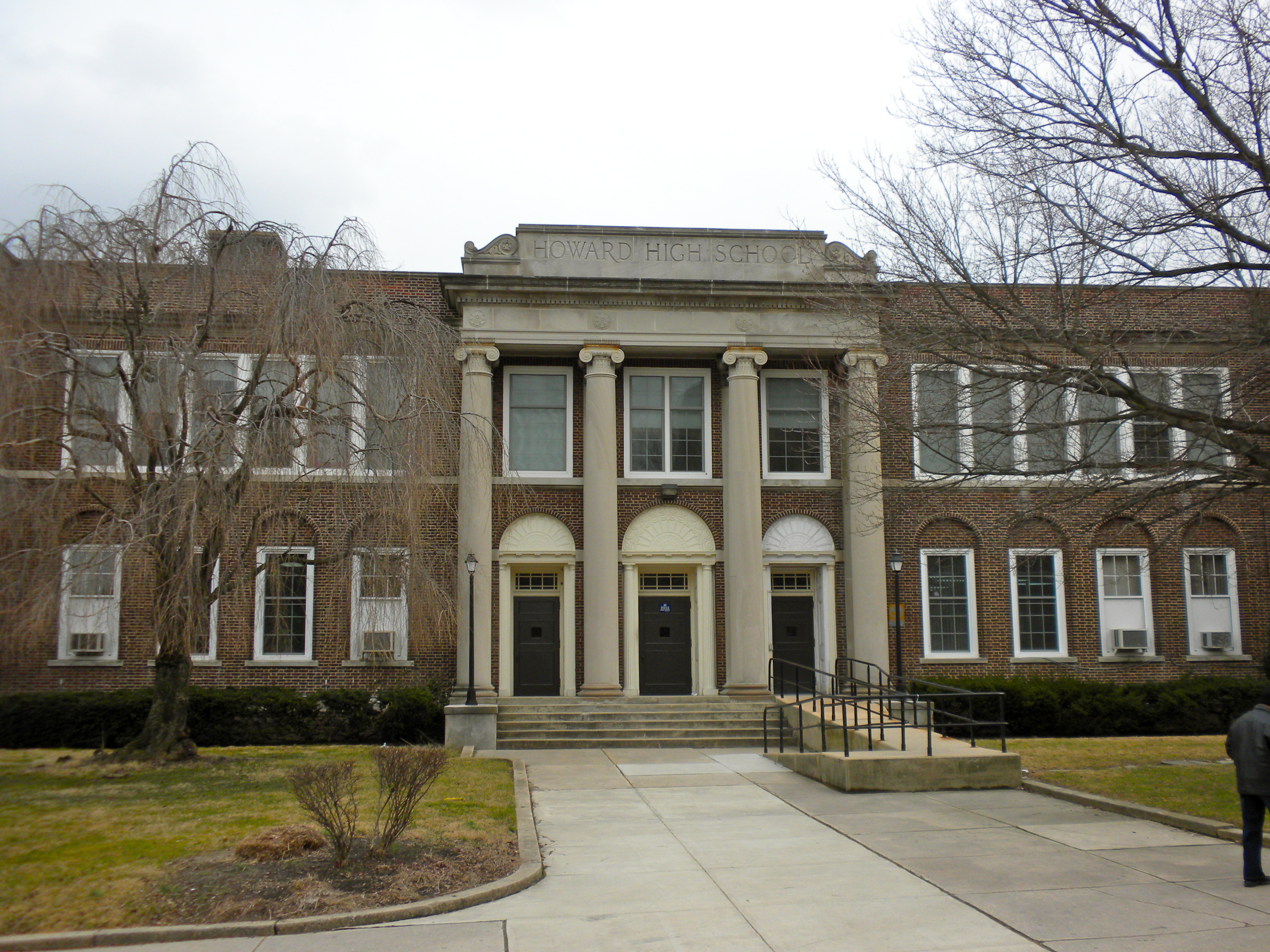
- Entrance of original building

- Location within Delaware Location within the United States
- Built: 1867
- Architect: James Oscar Batelle
- Part of: East Brandywine Historic District (ID85003220)
- NRHP reference No.: 85000309

Significant dates
- Added to NRHP: February 21, 1985
- Designated NHL: April 4, 2005
- Designated CP: December 19, 1985

Howard High School of Technology is a vocational-technical high school in Wilmington, Delaware and is the oldest of four high schools within the New Castle County Vocational-Technical School District, which includes Delcastle Technical High School in Newport, Hodgson Vo-Tech High School in Glasgow, and St. Georges Technical High School in St. Georges.

In 2022 it was designated an affiliated area of Brown v. Board of Education National Historical Park.

== History ==
Howard High School, named for General Oliver Otis Howard, who founded Howard University and was the Commissioner for the Freedmen's Bureau from 1865 to 1874, opened in 1867 at 12th and Orange St. with educator Edwina Kruse as its principal. Despite being a public school, Howard received very little state funding, particularly compared to white-only schools, and conditions rapidly declined. For many years, Howard families appealed to the government for financial aid for the building, which had been deemed "hazardous to an extreme degree, although inadequate for instructional purposes." In the early 1920s, businessman Pierre S. du Pont, who had a history of supporting education for Black students in Delaware, donated a swath of land in Wilmington for the purpose of building a new Howard High School.

In 1953, Howard was the subject of Gebhart v. Belton, a desegregation case wherein parents of Howard students sued for the opportunity for their children to attend all-white schools in their town rather than the much-further-away Howard High School, which by this point had become run-down. Gebhart v. Belton was combined with four other cases in the US Supreme Court to form the Brown v. Board of Education suit in 1954.

In 1975, Howard High School closed and was replaced by the Howard Educational Park, then the Howard Career Center. It sits adjacent to the original Howard High School. The school settled on its current name, Howard High School of Technology, in late 1993.

=== Killing of Amy Joyner-Francis ===
On April 21, 2016, Amy Inita Joyner-Francis, a female 16-year-old student at Howard High School of Technology was assaulted and killed by a fellow student, Trinity Carr in a school bathroom while two other students allegedly assisted. The incident was widely publicized and started controversy about the appropriate charges of teenagers involved in situations of school violence and assault. Two of the students were convicted of conspiracy and one of the two was convicted of negligent homicide. The latter conviction was later overturned in a ruling that has faced some criticism. A third student was acquitted of a conspiracy charge.

== Academics ==
In addition to 10 credits within their chosen program, Howard students must meet Delaware core standards: 4 credits of English and math; 3 science and social studies credits; 2 language credits; 1 physical education credit; and 0.5 health credits. Each of the career programs has its own required courses, which allows students to gain the most contextual education possible.

There are 14 career programs separated into five distinct areas at Howard:

- Business, Communication, and Computers: Academy of Finance and Business and Computer Network Administration
- Construction Technologies: Building Automation and Carpentry
- Health Services: Dental Assisting; Medical Assisting; and Nursing Technology
- Public and Consumer Services: Cosmetology; Culinary Arts; Legal Administrative Assistant; Legal Support Services; and the Teacher Academy for K-12
- Transportation: Auto/Diesel Technology and Engine Technology

Howard also has partnerships with higher education institutions such as Delaware Technical and Community College, University of Delaware, Wilmington University so students can earn dual enrollment credits as well. In 2017, more than 90% of those enrolled in college courses finished them successfully.

In 2021, Apple Inc. gave Howard a Distinguished School Award and they joined the iPad initiative, which gives each student a school-owned iPad to use for their schoolwork. As of the 2022–2023 school year, students are no longer given iPads to complete assignments. Students are now given Chromebooks. Additionally, teachers no longer receive MacBook laptops. Instead Dell laptops are distributed. 2013, Verizon selected Howard as one of twelve schools in the country as an Innovative Learning School; teachers received an intensive, two-day crash course on how to effectively use technology in the classroom.

== Athletics ==
Howard is part of the Delaware Interscholastic Athletic Association and offers eleven varsity sport teams that compete in Blue Hen Conference, Flight "B."

== Notable alumni ==
- Ralph E. Brock (1881–1959), first academically trained Black forester in the United States
- Emma Belle Gibson Sykes (1885–1970), suffragist, teacher, and civil rights activist
- Pauline Alice Young (1900–1991), activist, historian, author, and teacher
- Louis L. Redding (1901–1998), civic activist and Delaware's first Black lawyer
- Bubby Sadler (1909–1987), late Negro league baseball shortstop
- Edward L. Loper Sr. (1916–2011), artist and teacher
- Clifford Brown (1930–1956), jazz trumpeter
- Richard Allen Williams (b. 1936), cardiologist and founder of the Association of Black Cardiologists
- Stephanie Bolden (b. 1946), member of the Delaware House of Representatives
- Richard "Mouse" Smith (1949–2025), former president of the Delaware NAACP
- John Irving (1953–2015), late basketball player for Hofstra and Arizona as well as teams in Manila, Anderlecht, England, Tel Aviv, and Groningen
- A. J. English (b. 1967), retired NBA player
- Devon Still (b. 1989), former NFL defensive end

== See also ==
- Louis L. Redding Comprehensive High School - Segregated high school for African-Americans in Middletown (southern New Castle County)
- William W.M. Henry Comprehensive High School - Segregated high school for African-Americans in Dover (Kent County)
- William C. Jason Comprehensive High School - Segregated high school for African-Americans in Georgetown (Sussex County)
- Death of Amy Joyner-Francis
