= Bilal Nichols =

American football player (born 1996)

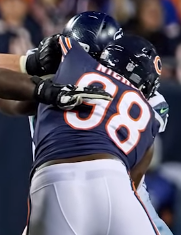
- Nichols with the Chicago Bears in 2018

Profile
- Position: Defensive end

Personal information
- Born: September 14, 1996 (age 30); Newark, Delaware, U.S.
- Listed height: 6 ft 3 in (1.91 m)
- Listed weight: 300 lb (136 kg)

Career information
- High school: Hodgson Vo-Tech (Glasgow, Delaware)
- College: Delaware (2014–2017)
- NFL draft: 2018: 5th round, 145th overall pick

Career history
- Chicago Bears (2018–2021); Las Vegas Raiders (2022–2023); Arizona Cardinals (2024–2025)

Awards and highlights
- First-team All-CAA (2017)

Career NFL statistics as of 2025
- Total tackles: 251
- Sacks: 14.0
- Forced fumbles: 2
- Fumble recoveries: 5
- Pass deflections: 6
- Interceptions: 1
- Stats at Pro Football Reference

Bilal Shakur Nichols (born September 14, 1996) is an American professional football defensive end. He was selected by the Chicago Bears in the fifth round of the 2018 NFL draft. He played college football for the Delaware Fightin' Blue Hens.

== College career ==
He had 56 tackles including 6.5 for loss, 5.5 sacks, an interception, four pass break-ups, and a blocked kick in 2017. He was named first-team All-Colonial Athletic Association for his season.

== Professional career ==
Pre-draft measurables
Height	Weight	Arm length	Hand span	40-yard dash	10-yard split	20-yard split	20-yard shuttle	Three-cone drill	Vertical jump	Broad jump	Bench press
6 ft 3 3/4 in (1.92 m)	306 lb (139 kg)	33 3/8 in (0.85 m)	10 1/4 in (0.26 m)	4.95 s	1.73 s	2.89 s	4.49 s	7.45 s	30.5 in (0.77 m)	9 ft 4 in (2.84 m)	29 reps
All values from NFL Combine/Pro Day

=== Chicago Bears ===
Nichols was selected by the Chicago Bears in the fifth round (145th overall) of the 2018 NFL draft. Like Nichols, Bears head coach Matt Nagy was a Delaware alumnus, while assistant Brian Ginn worked for the school before joining the Bears.

His first NFL start came in Week 10 of the 2018 season against the Detroit Lions, where he recorded his first full sack on quarterback Matthew Stafford in a 34–22 win. A second sack came in the season finale on the Minnesota Vikings' Kirk Cousins as the Bears won 24–10.

Nichols' 2019 season was marred by a broken hand that he suffered in Week 2 against the Denver Broncos. Upon his return, he primarily filled in for the injured Akiem Hicks at tackle. In the final game of the year against Minnesota, he recovered a fumble by Mike Boone on the Vikings' opening drive.

After nose tackle Eddie Goldman opted out of the 2020 season for COVID-19 reasons, Nichols took over his slot. In the Bears' Week 6 game against the Carolina Panthers, Nichols sacked Teddy Bridgewater at the Panthers' one-yard line; on the ensuing play, Bridgewater was intercepted by Tashaun Gipson to set up a Bears touchdown. In Week 13 against the Lions, Nichols recorded a sack on Matthew Stafford and his first career interception off a pass thrown by Stafford that he returned for seven yards during the 34–30 loss. Nichols was the first Bears defensive tackle to intercept a pass since Tommie Harris in 2009.

=== Las Vegas Raiders ===
Nichols signed a two-year, $11 million contract with the Las Vegas Raiders on March 17, 2022. During the Raiders' 2023 Week 16 victory over the Kansas City Chiefs, Nichols recovered a fumble by Patrick Mahomes and returned it 8 yards for his first career touchdown. Due to his performance in this game, he won the NVP award.

=== Arizona Cardinals ===
On March 14, 2024, Nichols signed a three-year contract with the Arizona Cardinals. He made six appearances (five starts) for Arizona, recording 10 combined tackles. On October 15, Nichols was placed on season–ending injured reserve after suffering a stinger.

Nichols began the 2025 season on the reserve/PUP list while he recovered from his neck injury, and activated before Week 5. In four appearances for Arizona, he compiled three combined tackles. On December 13, Nichols was placed on injured reserve due to a knee injury, ending his season. On March 6, 2026, Nichols was released by the Cardinals.
