= List of Omega Psi Phi grand conclaves =

Omega Psi Phi (ΩΨΦ) Grand Conclaves are the fraternity’s official international convention. Grand Conclaves were originally held annually. At some point in the 1950s or 1960s, the Grand Conclaves were changed to being held every eighteen months. After the 75th Grand Conclave in 1986, Grand Conclaves were changed to every two years. There were no conventions in 1930, 1942, and 1943.

| Conclave number | Dates | Location | Host chapter | References |
|---|---|---|---|---|
| 1st | 1912 | Washington, D.C. | | |
| 2nd | 1913 | Washington, D.C. | | |
| 3rd | 1914 | Washington, D.C. | | |
| 4th | 1915 | Oxford, Pennsylvania | | |
| 5th | 1916 | Washington, D.C. | | |
| 6th | 1917 | Oxford, Pennsylvania | | |
| 7th | 1918 | Washington, D.C. | | |
| 8th | 1919 | Boston, Massachusetts | | |
| 9th | 1920 | Nashville, Tennessee | | |
| 10th | December 27, 1921 – December 31, 1921 | Morehouse College, Atlanta University, Clark Atlanta University, and Gammon Theological Seminary; Atlanta, Georgia | | |
| 11th | 1922 | Philadelphia, Pennsylvania | | |
| 12th | December 1923 (Christmas week) | St. Louis, Missouri | | |
| 13th | 1924 | Washington, D.C. | | |
| 14th | 1925 | Tuskegee, Alabama | | |
| 15th | 1926 | Chicago, Illinois | Iota and Sigma Omega and ΣΩ | |
| 16th | December 1927 | Community House of St. Mark's M. E. Church; New York City, New York | Epsilon, Xi Phi, and Psi Phi | |
| 17th | 1928 | Indianapolis, Indiana | | |
| 18th | 1929 | Baltimore, Maryland | | |
| 19th | 1931 | Detroit, Michigan | | |
| 20th | 1932 | Richmond, Virginia | | |
| 21st | 1933 | Durham, North Carolina | | |
| 22nd | 1934 | St. Louis, Missouri | | |
| 23rd | December 27, 1935 – December 30, 1935 | Atlanta, Georgia | | |
| 24th | 1936 | Philadelphia, Pennsylvania | | |
| 25th | 1937 | Cleveland, Ohio | | |
| 26th | 1938 | Chicago, Illinois | Iota and Sigma Omega | |
| 27th | December 27, 1939 – December 30, 1939 | Little Theatre of the Harlem Branch of the YMCA; New York City, New York | Epsilon | |
| 28th | 1940 | Nashville, Tennessee | | |
| 29th | 1941 | Indianapolis, Indiana | | |
| 30th | 1944 | Little Rock, Arkansas | | |
| 31st | 1945 | Washington, D.C. | Alpha Omega | |
| 32nd | 1946 | Fort Worth, Texas | | |
| 33rd | December 27, 1947 – December 30, 1947 | Detroit, Michigan | | |
| 34th | December 27, 1948 – December 30, 1948 | Columbus, Ohio | | |
| 35th | December 28, 1949 – December 30, 1949 | Chicago, Illinois | | (Note: Guests include Etta Moten Barnett and William L Dawson.) |
| 36th | 1950 | Boston, Massachusetts | | |
| 37th | December 27, 1951 – December 30, 1951 | Lord Calvert Hotel; Miami, Florida | Sigma Alpha | (Note: The conclave's theme was Securing World Peace by Strengthening Democracy. Guests included Benjamin Mays.) |
| 38th | 1952 | Philadelphia, Pennsylvania | | |
| 39th | December 27, 1953 – December 30, 1953 | Cincinnati, Ohio | Beta Iota and Iota Epsilon | (Note: The conclave's theme was "Rights and Responsibilities of an Integrated Democracy".) |
| 40th | December 27, 1954 – December 30, 1954 | Atlanta, Georgia | | (Note: Guests include Benjamin Mays and Rufus Clement.) |
| 41st | August 18, 1955 – August 23, 1955 | Los Angeles, California | Lambda and Lambda Omicron | (Note: The conclave's theme was "Desegregation – a Way Station; Integration – Our Destination".) |
| 42nd | December 27, 1956 – December 30, 1956 | Morgan State College Baltimore, Maryland | | (Note: Dr. Martin Luther King Jr. spoke at this conclave which had the theme or "Wanted – Techniques for Strengthening and Furthering our Democratic Heritage".) |
| 43rd | December 27, 1957 – December 30, 1957 | Kiel Auditorium St. Louis, Missouri | | (Note: Conclave Number interpolated) |
| 44th | December 27, 1958 – December 30, 1958 | Cleveland, Ohio | | (Note: Speakers at this conclave included Wiley A Branton.) |
| 45th | December 27, 1959 – December 30, 1959 | Hotel New Yorker; New York City, New York | | (Note: Speakers at this conclave included Massachusetts Asst. Attorney General Herbert E. Tucker) |
| 46th | December 27, 1960 – December 30, 1960 | San Antonio, Texas | | |
| 47th | August 13, 1961 – August 18, 1961 | Washington, D.C. | Alpha, Alpha Omega, and Kappa Psi | (Note: This was Omega Psi Phi's Golden Anniversary Celebration. The speakers included Attorney General Robert F. Kennedy and Federal Housing Administrator Dr. Robert C. Weaver.) |
| 48th | 1962 | Indianapolis, Indiana | | (Note: Speakers included Indiana Governor Matthew E. Welsh.) |
| 49th | August 1964 | Denver, Colorado | | |
| 50th | December 27, 1965 – December 30, 1965 | Sheraton-Cadillac Hotel; Detroit, Michigan | | |
| 51st | August 13, 1967 | Boston, Massachusetts | | |
| 52nd | 1968 | Charlotte, North Carolina | | |
| | 1969 | Atlanta, Georgia | | (Note: This was a Constitutional Convention.) |
| 53rd | August 1, 1970 – August 6, 1970 | Pittsburgh Hilton; Pittsburgh, Pennsylvania | | |
| 54th | December 1971 | Houston, Texas | | |
| 55th | July 31, 1973 – August 5, 1973 | St. Louis, Missouri | | |
| 56th | December 1974 | Phoenix, Arizona | | |
| 57th | August 15, 1976 – August 21, 1976 | Atlanta, Georgia | | |
| 58th | 1977 | New Orleans, Louisiana | | |
| 59th | August 5, 1979 – August 11, 1979 | Denver, Colorado | | (Note: The conclave theme was "Omega focuses on Family: The Keystone of our Society".) |
| 60th | December 26, 1980 – December 31, 1980 | San Francisco Hilton and Tower; San Francisco, California | | (Note: The conclave's theme was "The Decade is the 80's, but Black Problems are the Same: What Now?" Guests include Ernest Green, Benjamin Hooks, and Jesse Jackson.) |
| 61st | August 7, 1982 – August 14, 1982 | Fontainebleau Miami Beach; Miami Beach, Florida | Sigma Alpha | (Note: This conclave's guests included Benjamin Hooks, Jesse Jackson, Vernon Jordan, H. Carl Moultrie, Calvin S. Morris, Oscar W. Adams Jr., and William Jason.) |
| 62nd | 1983 | Kansas City, Missouri | | |
| 63rd | December 26, 1984 – December 30, 1984 | Galt House; Louisville, Kentucky | Theta Omega / Phi Eta | |
| 64th | July 25, 1986 – August 1, 1986 | Washington, D.C. | Alpha Omega | (Note: This conclave honored the fraternity's 75th anniversary. Its guests include Douglas Wilder, Earl Graves, Walter Fauntroy, Jesse Jackson, Benjamin Hooks, James Ursy, and Randall Robinson.) |
| 65th | July 23, 1988 – July 29, 1988 | Dallas, Texas | | |
| 66th | 1990 | Detroit, Michigan | | |
| 67th | 1992 | Atlanta, Georgia | | |
| 68th | July 22, 1994 – July 29, 1994 | Cleveland, Ohio | | |
| 69th | 1996 (Summer) | Los Angeles, California | | |
| 70th | July 10, 1998 – July 16, 1998 | Marriott Hotel; New Orleans, Louisiana | | |
| 71st | July 22, 2000 – July 27, 2000 | Indiana Convention Center; Indianapolis, Indiana | | |
| 72nd | July 10, 2002 – July 17, 2002 | Charlotte Convention Center; Charlotte, North Carolina | | (Note: The conclave's theme was "Empowering Minorities: Economically and Socially".) |
| 73rd | July 19, 2004 – July 29, 2004 | Adam's Mark Hotel; St. Louis, Missouri | | |
| 74th | July 20, 2006 – July 23, 2006 | Statehouse Convention Center; Little Rock, Arkansas | | |
| 75th | July 13, 2008 – July 17, 2008 | Sheraton Birmingham; Birmingham, Alabama | Alpha Phi | |
| 76th | July 22, 2010 – July 30, 2010 | Raleigh Convention Center; Raleigh, North Carolina | Iota Iota | |
| 77th | July 27, 2011 – July 31, 2011 | Washington, D.C. | Alpha Omega | (Note: This conclave was also the fraternity's Centennial Celebration.) |
| 78th | July 5, 2012 – July 12, 2012 | Minneapolis, Minnesota | Epsilon Rho and Xi | |
| 79th | July 10, 2014 – July 16, 2014 | Philadelphia, Pennsylvania | Mu Omega | |
| 80th | July 21, 2016 – July 28, 2016 | Las Vegas, Nevada | | |
| 81st | July 20, 2018 – July 24, 2018 | New Orleans, Louisiana | | |
| 82nd | July 17, 2020 – July 19, 2020 | Virtual | | (Note: This conclave took place virtually in response to the COVID-19 pandemic.) |
| 83rd | July 21, 2022 – July 26, 2022 | Charlotte, North Carolina | Pi Phi | |
| 84th | June 26, 2024 – July 2, 2024 | Tampa, Florida | Pi Iota | |
| 85th | July 30, 2026 – August 3, 2026 | Cincinnati, Ohio | Beta Iota | |
