= Steve Turley =

American New Testament scholar and former classical guitarist

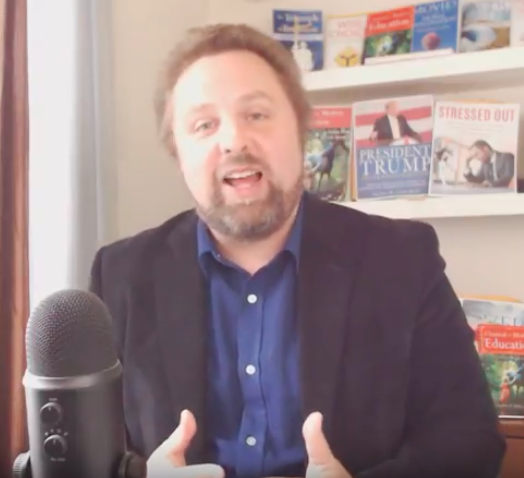
- Turley in 2018
- Born: Stephen Richard Turley; 1969 (age 56–57)
- Occupation: Adjunct instructor

Academic background
- Education: Peabody Conservatory
- Alma mater: Durham University (PhD)
- Thesis: Revealing rituals: Washings and meals in Galatians and 1 Corinthians (2013)

Academic work
- Institutions: Delaware Valley Classical School
- Website: turleytalks.com

Stephen Richard Turley (born 1969) is an American former classical guitarist and educator, author, social theorist, and content creator.

== Early life and education ==
Turley grew up in Orange, Connecticut. He attended college at the Peabody Conservatory where he studied under Ray Chester and Manuel Barrueco, and has had a minor career as a performing artist.

In 2013, Turley received his Doctor of Philosophy from the Department of Theology and Religion, Durham University.

== Early career ==
In the 1990s, Turley was a classical guitarist. He later studied classical guitar at the Peabody Conservatory of Music. He went on to become an adjunct faculty member in the music department of Eastern University, where he taught until 2019.

From 2002 to 2021, Turley taught theology, rhetoric, aesthetics, and Greek at Delaware Valley Classical School.

In his 2018 book Beauty Matters: Creating a High Aesthetic in School Culture, Turley argues that learning about classical ideas of the beautiful can teach students to understand Christian ideas of the good.

== Political commentator ==
A 2015 doctoral dissertation analyses a 2014 Turley essay on immigration in which Turley argues against cosmopolitan commitment to globalization and on the grounds that it deviates from traditional forms of religiosity, and national and local beliefs and practices. Drawing on the interpretations of Deuteronomy 10:18-19 by theologian and Egyptologist James K. Hoffmeier, Turley draws a sharp distinction between legal and illegal immigrants, arguing that churches should not aid, comfort, and "in effect adopt illegal immigrants and their families, help pay for lawyer's fees to make sure they get a fair hearing in the courts, and then provide the resources needed to help them fulfill the court’s decisions" (p. 230). According to Benfel, Turley understands globalization as "in effect a worldwide social system constituted by the interaction between a capitalist economy, telecommunications, technology, and mass urbanization," that "is bringing an end to the whole concept of distinct nations." In Turley's view, "porous borders" and large scale immigration threaten the shared historic, linguistic, and religious heritage that is unique to each nation. He perceives reactions as, "in the face of threats to localized identity markers, people assert their religiosity, kinship, and national symbols as mechanisms of resistance against globalizing dynamics" (p. 341).

Writing in June 2016, Rod Dreher concurred with Turley's perception that nationalism is a growing phenomenon in Europe, but doubted Turley's claim that "a renewed Christian Europe may not be so far away."

== Film director ==
In 2022, Turley directed The Return of the American Patriot: The Rise of Pennsylvania, a documentary about Doug Mastriano, the Republican Party candidate in the 2022 Pennsylvania gubernatorial election. The Philadelphia Inquirer described it as "hagiographic," while Vice called it "right-wing propaganda".

== Scholarship ==
According to William Scheick, who teaches early American literature at the University of Texas, in a 2008 article about the Jonathan Edwards sermon Sinners in the Hands of an Angry God, Turley argues that in the notable sermon, widely understood as emphasizing the afterlife, Edwards was actually speaking about a quotidian evangelical intensity he shared with his listeners.

== Books ==
- The Ritualized Revelation of the Messianic Age: Washings and Meals in Galatians and 1 Corinthians, released by T&T Clark, 2015, is on the same subject as his doctoral dissertation. Jan Heilmann of The Journal of Theological Studies wrote that Turley's work "is theoretically well grounded and an indispensable contribution to ritual studies and Pauline scholarship." Catholic Biblical Quarterly's Wendell Willis added, "The author has added a dimension to the reading of Paul by employing approaches found in cognate fields of study, in this case ritual."
- Awakening Wonder: A Classical Guide to Truth, Goodness, and Beauty. Classical Academic Press, 2014.
- Echoes of Eternity: A Classical Guide to Music. Classical Academic Press, 2018.
- Classical vs. Modern Education: A Vision from C.S. Lewis. CreateSpace Independent Publishing Platform, 2 November 2017.
- Gazing: Encountering the Mystery of Art. CreateSpace Independent Publishing Platform, 1 June 2018.
- Classical vs. Modern Education: A Vision from C.S. Lewis. Canon Press, 7 April 2017.
