= Killing of Amy Joyner-Francis =

School violence incident in 2016

- Instagram photo of victim Amy Joyner-Francis
- Location: 39°44′47.6″N 75°32′29.6″W; Howard High School of Technology, Wilmington, Delaware, U.S.
- Date: April 21, 2016; 10 years ago c. 8:18 am EST
- Target: Amy Inita Joyner-Francis
- Attack type: Homicide by blunt trauma, assault, school violence
- Victims: Amy Inita Joyner-Francis, aged 16
- Perpetrators: Trinity Carr; Zion Snow
- Motive: Personal dispute
- Accused: Trinity Carr; Zion Snow; Chakeira Wright
- Charges: Carr; Criminally negligent homicide Carr, Snow, Wright; Third-degree criminal conspiracy
- Verdict: Carr; Guilty of criminally negligent homicide (overturned); Carr, Snow; Guilty of third-degree criminal conspiracy Wright; Not guilty of third-degree criminal conspiracy
- Convictions: Carr and Snow: Third-degree criminal conspiracy
- Sentence: Carr; 6 months in juvenile detention, 500 hours of community service, probation until age 21; Snow; 18 months of community supervision, 300 hours of community service

On April 21, 2016, Amy Inita Joyner-Francis, a female 16-year-old student at Howard High School of Technology in Wilmington, Delaware, was assaulted and killed by another student, Trinity Carr in a school bathroom while two other students allegedly assisted. The incident was widely publicized and started controversy about the appropriate charges of teenagers involved in situations of school violence and assault. Two of the students were convicted of conspiracy and one of the two was also convicted of negligent homicide. The latter conviction was later overturned in a ruling that has faced some criticism. A third student was acquitted of a conspiracy charge.

== Killing ==
On the morning of April 21, 2016 in Howard High School of Technology, Amy Joyner-Francis, a female 16-year-old student, was confronted by three female students: Trinity Carr, Zion Snow, and Chakeira Wright, on the second-floor female restroom of the school. It is unknown what precisely happened between the confrontation and the attack, but the motive was allegedly a personal dispute "over a boy". Joyner-Francis was soon assaulted by Carr. Carr hit and kicked Joyner-Francis, landing punches to Joyner-Francis's head and torso while Joyner-Francis clutched for her purse. Carr dragged Joyner-Francis by her hair and repeatedly smashed her head into the sink inside a handicap-accessible stall in the restroom. At some point during the attack, Carr ripped Joyner-Francis's fingernails out. Dozens of other female students watched the killing unfold, and the incident was recorded on the cell phones of at least two students, which would later be used as crucial evidence against the three accused girls in their later trial. Joyner-Francis fell to the floor as Snow began to kick her. Onlookers, including Wright, attempted to pull Carr off of Joyner-Francis, as Joyner-Francis appeared to attempt to cling onto Carr's shirt. Joyner-Francis laid on the floor of the bathroom as her breathing labored and eventually lost consciousness. She died shortly after the attack was over. Joyner-Francis was flown by a state police helicopter to Nemours A.I. DuPont Hospital for Children in critical condition and was pronounced dead.

=== Autopsy ===
An autopsy by the Delaware medical examiner determined that Joyner-Francis's death was a homicide. It was concluded that she died from cardiac arrest, caused by blunt force trauma and complications from a previous heart condition that Joyner-Francis had before her assault. It was confirmed, however, that Joyner-Francis would not have died if she had not been assaulted.

== State v. Carr, Snow, and Wright ==
State v. Carr, Snow, and Wright
- Court: Delaware Family Court
- Full case name: The State of Delaware v. Trinity Carr, Zion Snow, and Chakeira Wright
- Submitted: May 9, 2016
- Decided: April 13, 2017; 9 years ago
- Prosecution: Sean Lugg
- Defense: John Deckers

Case opinions
- Decision by: Robert Coonin

Following the killing of Joyner-Francis, some characterized the attack as a murder, and advocated for murder charges to be brought against Carr. The state declined to charge Carr with first or second-degree murder, instead pursuing a charge of criminally negligent homicide.

Trinity Carr, the student who assaulted and killed Joyner-Francis, was charged with both criminally negligent homicide and third-degree criminal conspiracy, while Zion Snow and Chakeira Wright were only charged with the latter. All three girls were released on bail in May 2016.

Trinity Carr, Zion Snow, and Chakeira Wright were tried by Delaware Family Court Judge Robert Coonin. Coonin decided to try the three defendants as juveniles rather than adults. Carr faced up to 8 years in prison if she were to be charged as an adult for criminally negligent homicide.

The video of the killing and social media comments were used as crucial evidence, including a comment that one of the girls made on social media about Joyner-Francis's death, saying, "Fuck This Retarted [sic] Nose Having Ass Bitch, She Ugly. We Made Sure We Killed That Bitch! #ripamy Bitches."

On April 13, 2017, Carr was found guilty of both counts of criminally negligent homicide and third-degree criminal conspiracy and Snow was found guilty on the count of third-degree criminal conspiracy. Judge Coonin commented that, "beyond a reasonable doubt, the death of Amy Joyner-Francis was caused by the action of Trinity Carr." It was determined that Carr and Snow had planned the attack 20 hours prior to it occurring. Wright was found not guilty of third-degree criminal conspiracy, with Judge Coonin saying that the evidence that Wright took part in planning the attack was "insufficient". Coonin also noted that Wright had attempted to pull Carr off of Joyner-Francis after the attack ensued.

Carr was sentenced to 6 months in juvenile detention, 500 hours of community service, and probation until age 21. She did not face jail time as the prosecution had sought. Snow was sentenced to 18 months of community supervision and 300 hours of community service.

== Overturning of homicide conviction and further lawsuits ==
On March 1, 2018, the Supreme Court of Delaware overturned Carr's negligent homicide conviction, ruling that Carr could not have known that Joyner-Francis would die when she assaulted her. Her conspiracy conviction, however, was upheld. The decision was criticized by some, pointing out that criminally negligent homicide, defined in Delaware as "when, with criminal negligence, the person causes the death of another person," does not require that a perpetrator is aware their victim will die. A spokeswoman for the Joyner-Francis family said of the overturning of Carr's conviction, "The most dangerous city in the nation for children between 12 and 17 is Wilmington, Delaware. The overturned ruling by the Delaware Supreme Court regarding the murder of Amy Joyner-Francis supports this fact."

Joyner-Francis's parents settled a lawsuit with the New Castle County Vocational-Technical School District for negligence and deprivation of constitutional rights in April 2018.

== See also ==
- Howard High School of Technology
- School violence in the United States
