= Lori Van Sickle =

American professional golfer (born 1962/63)

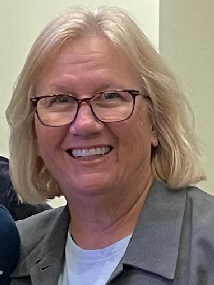
- Van Sickle in 2026

Personal information
- Born: 1962 or 1963 (age 63–64)
- Education: Ohio University; University of Delaware

Sport
- Sport: Golf / softball / basketball / field hockey / volleyball
- College team: Ohio / Delaware (softball)
- Club: DuPont Country Club

Lori Lynn Van Sickle (née Ludvigson; born 1962 or 1963) is an American golfer. She was the head professional and director of golf at the DuPont Country Club in Wilmington, Delaware, and competed at the U.S. Women's Amateur twice. Before her golf career, Van Sickle played college softball for the Ohio Bobcats and Delaware Fightin' Blue Hens and was an all-state player in high school. She was inducted into the Delaware Sports Museum and Hall of Fame in 2012.

== Biography ==
Van Sickle is from Wilmington, Delaware. She grew up playing several sports and competed in field hockey and basketball at Springer Junior High School. Afterwards, she attended Brandywine High School, where she participated in softball, basketball, and volleyball, collecting the maximum of nine varsity letters while being an All-State performer. She was also an All-Blue Hen Conference Flight B selection in multiple sports. After high school, Van Sickle enrolled at Ohio University, where she received one of the school's two softball scholarships and played at third base. She finished with the team's best fielding percentage in each of her first two seasons before transferring to the University of Delaware. Van Sickle, a two-time varsity letter recipient, was used as an infielder for the Delaware Fightin' Blue Hens.

After college, Van Sickle worked for eight years in the circulation department at The News Journal in Wilmington. She began playing golf at age 21. When asked to choose between her job and golfing, she decided to leave The News Journal. During her career, she competed at the U.S. Women's Amateur twice as well as at the U.S. Women's Mid-Amateur. Van Sickle, who played on the FUTURES Tour, turned professional in 1987. A member of the DuPont Country Club, where she worked starting in 1986 as a pro shop employee, she was described in The News Journal as "the hottest golfer in Delaware" in 1988. From 1986 to 1989, she won the DuPont club championship each year. Van Sickle later became the assistant golf professional at DuPont before being named head pro in 1994. She became the only woman to be head pro of an LPGA Tour site nationally. The next year, she was promoted to the club's director of golf.

Van Sickle was considered one of the top golf teachers in the area and gave instruction to hundreds of golfers, including then-University of Delaware football coach K. C. Keeler. In 2001, she received the highest rank, certified master professional, from PGA of America, and was the first person to earn it. Van Sickle left DuPont in 2005 and later became director of golf at the Inniscrone Golf Club in Avondale, Pennsylvania. She has also been active with the Special Olympics, volunteering as a golf teacher and co-founding the Special Olympics Delaware golf program. In 2012, Van Sickle was inducted into the Delaware Sports Museum and Hall of Fame.

She married William Van Sickle in December 1981. They have two daughters, including Caitlin Van Sickle, a field hockey player who competed at the 2016 Summer Olympics.
