= Caroline Williams (disambiguation) =

Caroline Williams (born 1957) is an American actress and producer

Caroline Williams may also refer to:

- Caroline B. Williams (1875-1971), American teacher and suffragist
- Caroline Fanny Williams (1839–1886), English landscape painter
- Caroline Randall Williams (born 1987), American author, poet and academic
- Caroline Ransom Williams (1872–1952), Egyptologist and classical archaeologist
