= Jamil Merrell =

American football player (1990–2026)

No. 60, 51, 91
- Position: Defensive lineman

Personal information
- Born: May 9, 1990; Bear, Delaware, U.S.
- Died: July 7, 2026 (aged 36)
- Listed height: 6 ft 4 in (1.93 m)
- Listed weight: 252 lb (114 kg)

Career information
- High school: Newark (DE) Hodgson Vo-Tech
- College: Rutgers
- NFL draft: 2014: undrafted

Career history
- Brooklyn Bolts (2014); Chicago Bears (2014–2015)*; Los Angeles KISS (2016); Colorado Crush (2017)
- * Offseason or practice squad member only

Career AFL statistics
- Total Tackles: 15
- Sacks: 1
- Fumble recoveries: 2
- Stats at ArenaFan.com
- Stats at Pro Football Reference

Jamil Merrell (May 9, 1990 – July 7, 2026) was an American football defensive lineman. He played college football at Rutgers University and attended Hodgson Vo-Tech High School in Newark, Delaware. He was also a member of the Brooklyn Bolts, Chicago Bears, Los Angeles KISS, and Colorado Crush.

== Early life ==
Merrell attended Hodgson Vo-Tech High School, where he played with his twin brother Jamal.

== College career ==
Merrell played for the Rutgers Scarlet Knights from 2009 to 2013.

== Professional career ==
Pre-draft measurables
Height	Weight	40-yard dash	10-yard split	20-yard split	20-yard shuttle	Three-cone drill	Vertical jump	Broad jump	Bench press
6 ft 3 in (1.91 m)	252 lb (114 kg)	4.90 s	1.68 s	2.84 s	4.58 s	7.37 s	28.8 in (0.73 m)	9 ft 1 in (2.77 m)	20 reps
All values from Rutgers Pro Day

After he attended a tryout for the Chicago Bears, Merrell signed with the Brooklyn Bolts of the Fall Experimental Football League.

In late November 2014, the Chicago Bears signed Merrell to their practice squad.

Merrell was assigned to the Los Angeles KISS of the Arena Football League for the 2016 season.

On November 17, 2016, Merrell signed with the Colorado Crush. On March 15, 2017, Merrell was placed on season-ending injured reserve.

== Death ==
Merrell died on July 7, 2026, at the age of 36.
