= Caroline B. Williams =

Caroline B. Williams (1875 - December 18, 1971) was an American suffragist and public school teacher. Williams was born in Washington, D.C., in 1875 and lived for many years in Wilmington, Delaware, where she taught at Howard High School.

== Biography ==
Williams was born in Washington, D.C. in 1875.

Williams graduated from Westfield Normal School and then taught for two years at Tuskegee Institute. Williams passed the teacher's examinations and was assigned a teaching position in 1898 in Wilmington, Delaware. She became part of Howard High School, starting in the grammar department.

Williams, along with other teachers at Howard High School, founded the Wilmington Equal Suffrage Club. In 1914, Williams was a founding member of the Suffrage Study Club in Wilmington. This club disbanded in 1920 and became the Committee of Colored Republican Women, with Williams serving as group secretary. Around the same time, Williams was also active in the NAACP, helping to bring a headquarters of the group to Wilmington. Throughout her life, she was active in the YWCA and Shiloh Baptist Church in Wilmington.

Williams went back to school at the University of Pennsylvania and obtained a Bachelor of Science degree in 1930. She retired from teaching in 1945.

Williams died after a long illness on December 18, 1971 in Wilmington and was buried at Mount Olive Cemetery.

== Bibliography ==
- "Equal Suffrage Study Club". Sunday Morning Star. June 7, 1914. p. 14.
- "Colored Women's Republican Club". Wilmington Evening Journal. September 6, 1920. p. 8.
- Dublin, Thomas (October 2020). "A Crowdsourcing Approach to Revitalizing Scholarship on Black Women Suffragists". The Journal of the Gilded Age and Progressive Era. 19 (4): 575–590. doi:10.1017/S1537781420000328. ISSN 1537-7814.
