= Edwina Kruse =

American educator

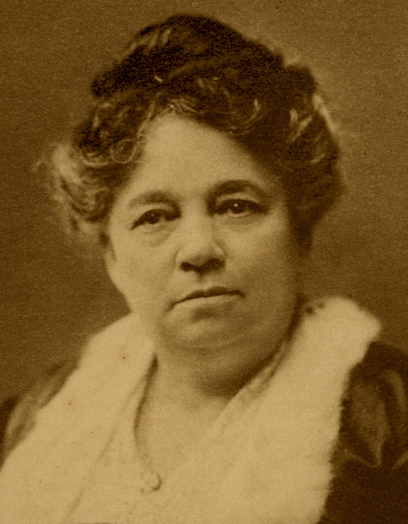
- Born: February 22, 1848; San Juan, Puerto Rico
- Died: June 23, 1930 (aged 82); Wilmington, Delaware
- Occupations: Educator, school administrator

Edwina Kruse (February 22, 1848 – June 23, 1930) was an American educator, born in Puerto Rico. She was principal of Howard High School in Wilmington, Delaware for almost 40 years, and a close associate of Alice Dunbar-Nelson, who taught at Howard.

== Early life ==
Edwina B. Kruse was born in San Juan, Puerto Rico; one of her parents was German, the other Puerto Rican or Cuban. She moved to the United States as a small child, and both of her parents died when she was young. She was educated in Connecticut and Massachusetts, and at Hampton Institute in Virginia.

== Career ==
Kruse taught at Black schools in Delaware. In 1881, Kruse became the principal of Howard High School in Wilmington, Delaware. She often spoke to community groups about her work at the school, which was for a time the state's only public high school for Black students. Her tenure as the school's head covered a time of expansion and improved quality of the school, and the students held an annual celebration on her birthday (she liked to point out that she share a birthday with George Washington). Among the Howard students during her time as principal were civil rights lawyer Louis L. Redding and teacher and activist Pauline A. Young. When Booker T. Washington visited Wilmington in 1900, he stayed with Kruse.

She retired as principal in 1920. She helped establish the state's Industrial School for Colored Girls, which was renamed for Kruse in 1943; it was later merged with a white girls' reformatory, before being absorbed in a co-educational state program in the 1980s. She also helped create the Sarah Ann White Home for the Aged in Wilmington. She was one of the organizers of Wilmington's branch of the NAACP in 1914, and hosted an early meeting of the group in her home.

== Personal life ==
Kruse had a longtime personal relationship with writer Alice Dunbar-Nelson, who taught at Howard High School. Dunbar-Nelson left an unpublished novel in manuscript,This Mighty Oak, based on Kruse's life. Kruse mentored a girl from Trinidad, Etta A. Woodlen, who became a music teacher at Howard High School. Kruse died in 1930, aged 82 years. She was buried at Mount Olive Cemetery. A public pool in Wilmington was named for Kruse. In 1948, her former home was sold to raise funds for a scholarship at Howard High School.
