= Mount Olive Cemetery (Wilmington, Delaware) =

Cemetery in Wilmington, Delaware, US

Coordinates: 39.7572°N 75.5978°W

Mount Olive Cemetery is a historic Black cemetery located in Wilmington, Delaware. Mount Olive was once one of the only places in New Castle County where African Americans were legally allowed to be buried. Many African American soldiers were buried in Mount Olive.

Mount Olive Cemetery can trace its roots back to Reverend Peter Spencer's church in Wilmington where Black residents were buried, starting in 1861. Later, there were a number of Black cemeteries in the downtown area. In the early 1900s, a project to move bodies from some of these cemeteries led to around 13,000 people being moved and buried at the first Mount Olive. In 1914, all Black cemeteries inside Wilmington city limits were condemned. A second location for Mount Olive continued to accept burials until the 1980s.

By the 1970s, efforts to clean up the cemetery were underway. At this time, it was overgrown and many of the monuments were in poor shape. A group to aid the care and upkeep of the burial ground, the Friends of Mount Olive, was formed in 1980.

== Notable burials ==
- Edwina Kruse (1848–1930) educator.
- Caroline B. Williams (1875–1971) educator, activist and suffragist.
