= Dionna Harris =

American softball player

Dionna M. Harris
Personal information
- Born: March 4, 1968 (age 58) Wilmington, Delaware, U.S.
- Education: Temple University
Medal record
Women's softball
Representing the United States
Olympic Games
| Gold medal – first place | 1996 Atlanta | Team competition |
- Updated on 28 May 2014

Dionna M. Harris (born 4 March 1968) is an American, former collegiate right-handed softball second baseman and outfielder, originally from Wilmington, Delaware. She played two years for the defunct Temple Owls softball team from 1989 to 1990 in the Atlantic 10 Conference, where as a junior was named Player of The Year. She was also an Olympic champion and competed at the 1996 Summer Olympics in Atlanta.

== Career ==
Harris attended and played softball at Delcastle Technical High School in Wilmington, Delaware and Delaware Technical Community College. After graduating from community college, she attended Temple University, where she played second base and was named the 1990 Temple University Player of the Year. Following college, Harris joined the Amateur Softball Association and played outfield for the Connecticut Brakettes (1990–1994) and the California Jazz (1995–1996). Harris made the United States National team from 1993 to 1996, earning gold medals at the 1993 Intercontinental Cup, 1994 PanAm Games, 1995 Australian Games and 1996 Olympic Games. In 2001, Harris was inducted into the Delaware Sports Hall of Fame.

== Statistics ==
=== Temple Owls ===
| YEAR | G | AB | R | H | BA | RBI | HR | 3B | 2B | TB | SLG | BB | SO | SB | SBA |
| 1989 | 49 | 159 | 38 | 53 | .333 | 26 | 6 | 12 | 3 | 98 | .616% | 10 | 9 | 7 | 7 |
| 1990 | 46 | 152 | 37 | 60 | .394 | 26 | 6 | 9 | 6 | 102 | .671% | 10 | 5 | 10 | 15 |
| TOTALS | 95 | 311 | 75 | 113 | .363 | 52 | 12 | 21 | 9 | 200 | .643% | 20 | 14 | 17 | 22 |

=== Team USA ===
| YEAR | G | AB | R | H | BA | RBI | HR | 3B | 2B | TB | SLG | BB | SO |
| 1996 OLYMPICS | 9 | 19 | 5 | 8 | .421 | 1 | 0 | 0 | 0 | 8 | .421% | 1 | 1 |
