= Delaware Valley Classical School =

Location
- 903 East Basin Road; New Castle, Delaware 19720; United States; 39°39′54″N 75°34′58″W

Information
- Type: Classical Christian
- Established: 1994 (32 years ago)
- CEEB code: 080042
- Head of school: Anthony G. Urti
- Faculty: ~30
- Grades: K-12
- Enrollment: ~225
- Houses: Edwards, Kepler, Kuyper, Wilberforce
- Mascot: Titan
- Accreditation: Association of Classical and Christian Schools
- Website: www.delawarevalleyclassicalschool.org

Delaware Valley Classical School is a private, K-12 classical Christian school located in unincorporated New Castle County, Delaware, United States. For the 2026–27 academic year, enrollment is approximately 225 students, with approximately 30 faculty and staff.

== History ==
The school was founded as Christ Classical Christian School in 1994 by a group of homeschooling parents from Elkton, Maryland, taking inspiration from Douglas Wilson's book, Recovering the Lost Tools of Learning. In its first year, 23 students were enrolled. It relocated to Newark in 1995, to Hockessin in 1997, adopting the name Tall Oaks Classical School. In 2001, Donald Post became the school's second headmaster, and in 2006 moved to the Faith City Family Church building in Christiana. In 2010, the school moved to First Baptist Church in New Castle, Delaware, formerly occupied by New Castle Christian Academy. The school's third headmaster, Timothy Dernlan, took over in 2014, after serving one year as the upper school principal. In 2016, the school moved to the Red Lion campus, which they shared with Red Lion Christian Academy in a partnership with Reach Church's Reach Christian Schools. Under Reach's acquisition of Tall Oaks, athletics and other after-school activities were merged with Red Lion's programs.

In 2019, the school reorganized under the new name Delaware Valley Classical School and announced they would be starting in September 2019 back at the New Castle campus, with Anthony Urti as headmaster.

== Curriculum ==
In accordance with the classical tradition, the school divides education into three stages of learning: grammar (grades K-5), logic (grades 6–8), and rhetoric (grades 9–12). Latin instruction begins in the third grade, followed by Greek and Spanish in the upper grades. Art and music are also part of the core curriculum for all grades. The logic and rhetoric stages culminate in the preparation, presentation, and defense of a formal thesis. DVCS students have the opportunity to earn several college credits before graduation through a dual enrollment program with Cairn University. There are also elective opportunities for art, chess club, Russian literature, athletics, speech & debate, vocal ensemble, drama, orchestra, and creative writing.

== Extracurricular activities ==
=== Athletics ===
DVCS athletics has varsity and middle school programs for basketball, cross country, soccer, and volleyball, along with varsity baseball. They compete as the Titans in the Delaware Valley Christian Athletic Conference (DVCAC), with the exception of cross country, which for now remains in the Mid-Atlantic Independent League (MIL).

In 2015, the volleyball team and both cross-country teams earned 2nd place in the MIL, with Titan runners sweeping all four champion spots (varsity and middle school, boys and girls). Soccer standout Weston Marshall was a third-place winner of the 2020 DIAA/Harry Roberts-Senior Scholar Athlete awards. At the 2021 MIL championship, girls cross country runners took 2nd and 3rd place overall, but did not have enough participants to qualify for team standings. In 2023, both varsity cross country teams won 2nd place, and each team had one finisher in the top seven, earning all-conference honors. In 2025, the varsity girls won 2nd place, including two all-conference runners finishing 2nd and 6th overall.

In the final year of full participation in the MIL, the 2024-25 varsity boys basketball team placed third in the MIL championship, with Seth Corbett being named MVP for the league. In the first year after joining the DVCAC, the 2025-26 boys basketball team earned a first-round bye as the top seed in the North division, advancing to the championship game and finishing as runners up for the conference. The fall of 2026, both the girls volleyball team and the boys soccer team finished their regular seasons undefeated within their respective divisions. The soccer team went on to win the league's consolation game, while the volleyball team defeated Greenwood Mennonite School to take home the school’s first athletic championship.

=== Arts and science ===
During their partnership on the Red Lion campus, Tall Oaks students earned lead roles in productions of the musicals The Wizard of Oz, The Pirates of Penzance, and Newsies. In January 2020, DVCS staged its first musical production, Willy Wonka. Subsequent musicals have included Annie (2022), Disney's Beauty and the Beast (2023), The Sound of Music (2024), and Singin' in the Rain (2025). They returned to the stage in 2026 with The Wizard of Oz. Students also have opportunities to compete in the Delaware Secondary School Mathematics League and Delaware Science Olympiad.

== Awards and recognition ==
=== Accreditation ===
Tall Oaks (the predecessor organization) was a charter member and accredited school of the Association of Classical and Christian Schools (ACCS), one of the first 30 to earn that distinction. Delaware Valley Classical School was also granted full accreditation in its inaugural year.

=== Classic Learning Test ===
Students take the Classic Learning Test, an alternative standardized test comparable to the SAT or ACT college admission test, which assesses English, mathematical, and critical reasoning skills. Based on the median scores from the 2019–2020 school year, DVCS eleventh and twelfth graders ranked 3rd nationally. For the 2021–2022 academic year, DVCS seventh and eighth graders were ranked 9th on the CLT8, and ninth and tenth graders were ranked 3rd on the CLT10. For the 2022–2023 academic year, DVCS ranked 7th for the CLT8 and 11th for the CLT10.

=== Chrysostom Oratory Competition ===
Seniors present and defend a thesis as a requirement for graduation, after which it can be nominated for submission to the annual ACCS Chrysostom Oratory Competition. Students Kelly Weber, Phoebe Hu, and Sarah Chaffee represented Tall Oaks by earning first prize in the ACCS Chrysostom Oratory Competition in successive years from 2011 to 2013, and in 2017, Kana Turley became the fourth Tall Oaks student to earn first prize in the competition.

=== Poetry Out Loud ===
In 2017, Tall Oaks freshman Sam McGarvey was the second runner-up in the Poetry Out Loud State Competition, and went on to win the state title his sophomore year in 2018. He followed up in 2019 by taking the first runner-up spot his junior year, and then shared the stage his senior year with classmate Sarah Zhu, formerly of Tall Oaks, who took first runner-up in the 2020 state finals. The school was represented in 2021 by freshman Janelle Carter who was the state's second runner-up, and in 2022 by junior Kai Schmiedel who was the first runner-up. In 2024, junior Jono McGarvey represented the school, claiming the second runner-up spot.

=== Science Olympiad ===
The middle school Science Olympiad team took 2nd place overall for the 2018 state competition, with 1st place finishes in two events and 2nd place in another four. Both the middle school and high school teams earned 5th place overall in the 2019 competition, and the high school team returned in 2020 to earn 6th place (the middle school competition was canceled due to the COVID-19 pandemic). In 2022, the middle school Science Olympiad team once again took 2nd place overall in the state, with 1st place finishes in four events and top 5 in eight others. The high school team earned 1st place in one event and top 5 in four others. In 2023, the middle school team earned DVCS its first state championship, with 1st place finishes in four events and top 5 in eleven others. The team went on to represent Delaware at the national tournament at Wichita State University. The high school team placed in the top 5 in six of the twenty-four events. The middle school team repeated as state champions in 2024, with 1st place finishes in six of the twenty-five events and top 5 in eleven others. They went on to the 2024 national tournament at Michigan State University on May 24–25, 2024. The high school team took 6th place in the state with top 5 finishes in eleven events. In 2025, the middle school team finished in 2nd place with four 1st place events, and the high school team finished in 5th place with four 1st place events. In 2026, the middle school team finished in 3rd place with two 1st place events and another eleven events in the top 5, and the high school team finished in 4th place with two 1st place events and another ten events in the top 5.

=== National Mythology Exam ===
As a core component of its humanities curriculum, DVCS students participate in the Pegasus Mythology Exam (grades four through eight), and the Medusa Mythology Exam (grades nine through twelve), both sponsored by Excellence Through Classics. For the 2020–2021 academic year, fourteen DVCS students earned perfect scores. For the 2024-2025 academic year, 69 students were recognized for outstanding scores, including three perfect scores on level 1, nine perfect scores on level 2, and one perfect score on level 3 of the Pegasus exam.

=== Miscellaneous achievements ===
In 2017, Tall Oaks student Nick Yu earned a perfect score and a 3rd place finish in the Delaware Secondary School Mathematics League Invitational Meet. In 2021, sixth-grader Sophia Dorno placed 3rd in the Delaware State Spelling Bee. In 2026, fifth-grader Nathan Liang placed 2nd in the Delaware Regional Spelling Bee.

== See also ==
- Association of Classical and Christian Schools
- Classical Christian Education
