= Briean Boddy-Calhoun =

American football player (born 1993)

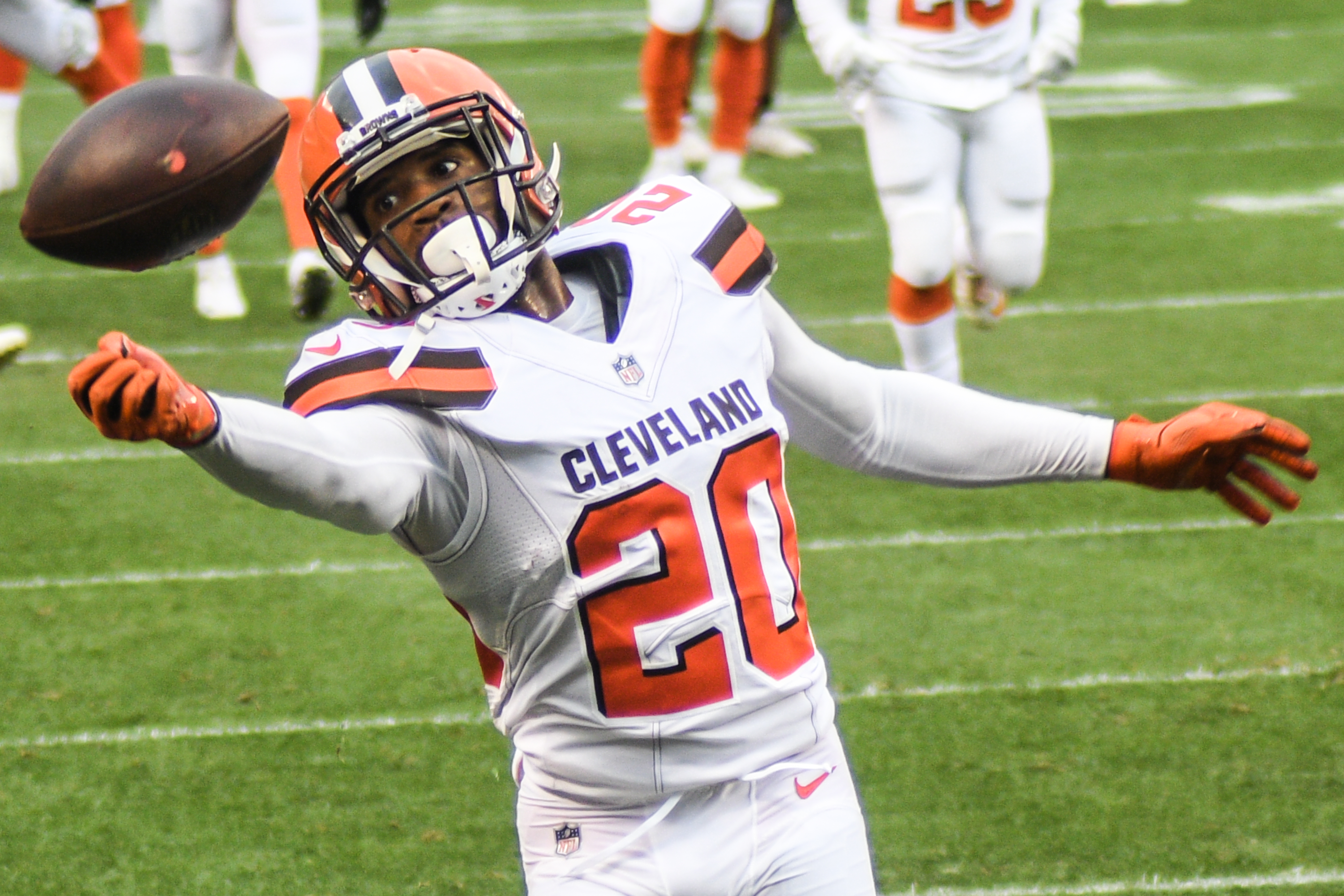
- Boddy-Calhoun with the Cleveland Browns in 2017

No. 20, 28, 47
- Position: Cornerback

Personal information
- Born: January 21, 1993 (age 33); Wilmington, Delaware, U.S.
- Listed height: 5 ft 9 in (1.75 m)
- Listed weight: 193 lb (88 kg)

Career information
- High school: Delcastle Technical (Wilmington, Delaware)
- College: Minnesota
- NFL draft: 2016: undrafted

Career history
- Jacksonville Jaguars (2016)*; Cleveland Browns (2016–2018); Houston Texans (2019); Indianapolis Colts (2019); San Francisco 49ers (2020); Tennessee Titans (2021)*
- * Offseason or practice squad member only

Awards and highlights
- First-team All-Big Ten (2014)

Career NFL statistics
- Total tackles: 151
- Sacks: 3.0
- Forced fumbles: 2
- Interceptions: 3
- Defensive touchdowns: 1
- Stats at Pro Football Reference

Briean Boddy-Calhoun (born January 21, 1993) is an American former professional football player who was a cornerback in the National Football League (NFL). He played college football at Minnesota, and was originally signed by the Jacksonville Jaguars as an undrafted free agent in 2016. He was also a member of the Cleveland Browns, Houston Texans, Indianapolis Colts, San Francisco 49ers and Tennessee Titans.

== Early life ==
Boddy-Calhoun attended Delcastle Technical High School, where he played high school football. He was named first-team all-conference and third-team all-state as a defensive back following his junior season. As a senior, he earned first-team all-state defensive back and second-team all-state kick returner honors. He was a three-time honorable mention all-conference selection as a quarterback. In addition to football, he was a standout in track & field and basketball. He earned all-state honors as a high jumper and was a two-time all-conference selection as a point guard in basketball.

== College career ==
=== Coffeyville Community College ===
After graduating high school, Boddy-Calhoun attended and played football for Coffeyville Community College. He was named second-team All-Jayhawk Conference as a cornerback after his only season as a member of the Red Ravens. He earned Jayhawk Conference Defensive Player of the Week honors twice and Special Teams Player of the Week once. He tallied 40 tackles, four interceptions, three fumble recoveries, and a blocked kick in his time with Coffeyville Community College.

=== University of Minnesota ===
Boddy-Calhoun transferred to the University of Minnesota after one season at Coffeyville Community College. He played in all 13 games as a reserve and made nine tackles. He made Minnesota debut at UNLV, but did not record any statistics. He had a career-high four tackles against Texas Tech.

Boddy-Calhoun suffered a season-ending knee injury in the second game of his junior season on September 7 at New Mexico State. He received a medical redshirt from the NCAA. He did contribute to the season early on. He made three tackles and returned an interception against UNLV. He made two tackles at New Mexico State before being injured.

Boddy-Calhoun played in 13 games and started 10 in his redshirt junior season. He finished the year with 51 tackles, including 2.0 tackles-for-loss and recorded five interceptions. He broke up nine passes and forced two fumbles and recovered one fumble. He was named All-Big Ten Conference First-team by the media and All-Big Ten Second-team by conference coaches.

Boddy-Calhoun played in 11 games and started nine games in his final season with Minnesota. He made 48 tackles, including 1.5 tackles-for-loss and paced the team with four interceptions and returned one for a touchdown. He broke up six passes and recovered a fumble. He was named All-Big Ten Third-team by the media and was an honorable mention selection by the conference coaches in recognition of his successful season.

== Professional career ==
External videos
- Boddy-Calhoun's NFL Combine workout

Pre-draft measurables
Height	Weight	Arm length	Hand span	40-yard dash	10-yard split	20-yard split	20-yard shuttle	Three-cone drill	Vertical jump	Broad jump	Bench press
5 ft 9 1/2 in (1.77 m)	193 lb (88 kg)	31 in (0.79 m)	9 1/8 in (0.23 m)	4.47 s	1.59 s	2.64 s	4.22 s	7.16 s	35 in (0.89 m)	10 ft 4 in (3.15 m)	10 reps
All values are from NFL Combine

=== Jacksonville Jaguars ===
After going undrafted in the 2016 NFL draft, Boddy-Calhoun signed with the Jacksonville Jaguars on May 1, 2016. On September 3, 2016, he was waived by the Jaguars during final team cuts.

=== Cleveland Browns ===
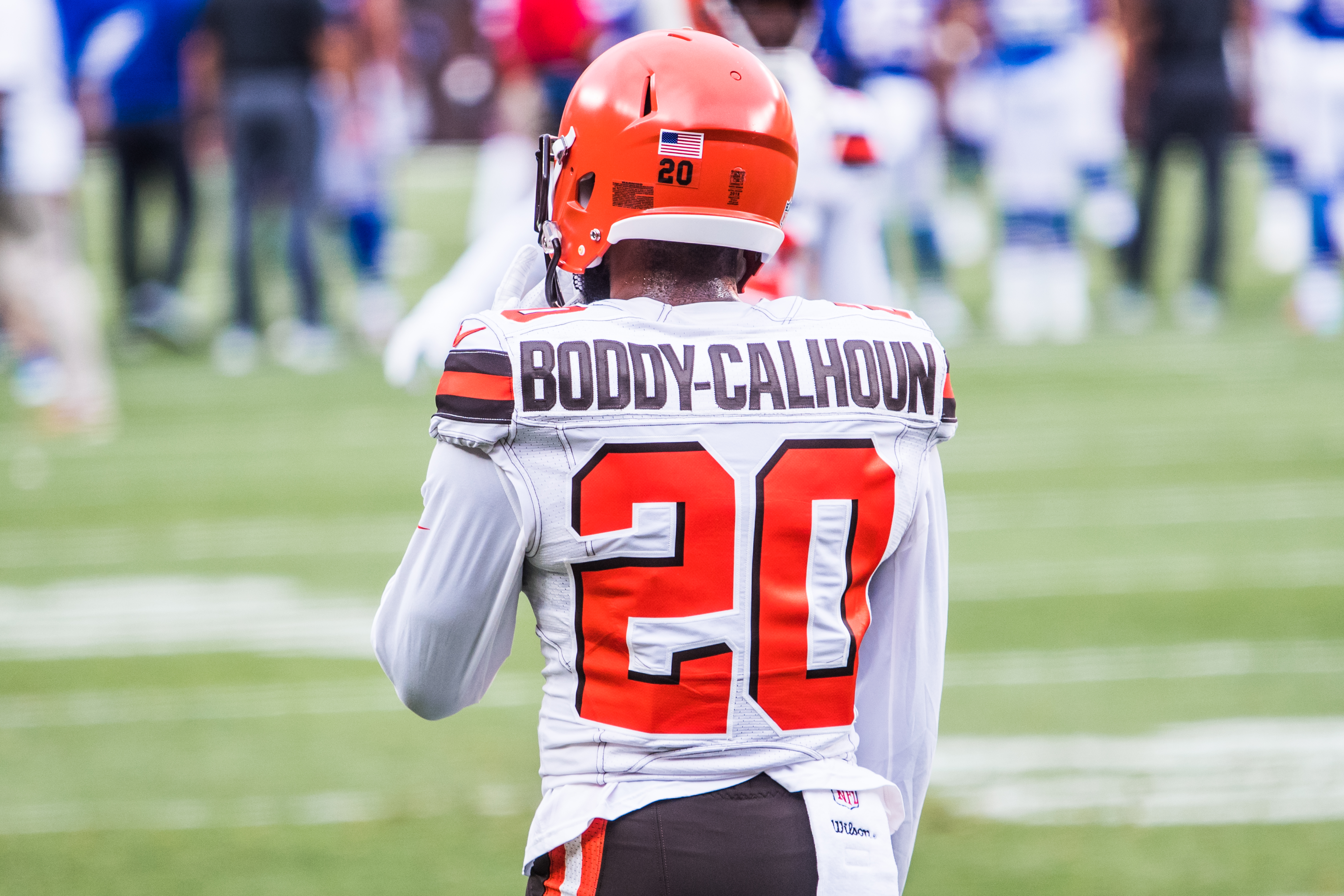
Boddy-Calhoun with the Browns in 2018

On September 4, 2016, one day after his release from the Jaguars, Boddy-Calhoun was claimed off waivers by the Cleveland Browns. He made his regular season NFL debut against the Miami Dolphins in a 30–24 loss in Week 3. Boddy-Calhoun finished the game with six tackles and an interception return for a touchdown. In the 2016 season, he recorded 39 tackles and assisted on four. He had one sack, which came against the Washington Redskins in Week 4, three interceptions, and 11 passes defended.

In the 2017 season, he appeared in 13 games and recorded 39 total tackles and six passes defended. In the 2018 season, he appeared in all 16 games. He finished with 56 total tackles, two passes defended, and one forced fumble.

=== Houston Texans ===
On March 15, 2019, Boddy-Calhoun signed a one-year contract with the Houston Texans. The Texans waived him on August 31 during final roster cuts. He was re-signed on October 30. He saw his first game action as a Texan on November 3, recording two solo tackles, two pass deflections, a sack, and a forced fumble in a Week 9 victory over the Jacksonville Jaguars. He was released on November 13.

=== Indianapolis Colts ===
On December 18, 2019, Boddy-Calhoun was signed by the Indianapolis Colts. He played in three games in the 2019 season with the Texans and Colts. He had two sacks, 13 total tackles, and one forced fumble.

After becoming a free agent in March 2020, Boddy-Calhoun had a tryout with the Chicago Bears on August 20, 2020.

=== San Francisco 49ers ===
On December 9, 2020, Boddy-Calhoun was signed to the practice squad of the San Francisco 49ers. He was promoted to the active roster on December 12. He played in Week 14 against the Washington Football Team in his only game time in the 2020 season. He was waived on December 14, and re-signed to the practice squad two days later. His practice squad contract with the team expired after the season on January 11, 2021. He was re-signed on March 17, 2021. Boddy-Calhoun was released on June 7, 2021.

=== Tennessee Titans ===
On July 28, 2021, Boddy-Calhoun signed with the Tennessee Titans. He was released on August 31, 2021, and re-signed to the practice squad.

== NFL career statistics ==
Regular season statistics
Year	Team	Games		Tackles				Interceptions						Fumbles	
Year	Team	GP	GS	Comb	Total	Ast	Sck	PD	Int	Yds	Avg	Lng	TDs	FF	FR
2016	CLE	14	6	43	39	4	1.0	11	3	94	31.3	67	1	0	0
2017	CLE	13	7	39	29	10	0.0	6	0	0	0.0	0	0	0	0
2018	CLE	16	8	56	44	12	0.0	2	0	0	0.0	0	0	1	0
2019	HOU	1	0	2	2	0	1.0	2	0	0	0.0	0	0	1	0
2019	IND	2	1	11	8	3	1.0	0	0	0	0.0	0	0	0	0
2020	SF	1	0	0	0	0	0.0	0	0	0	0.0	0	0	0	0
Career		47	22	151	122	29	3.0	19	3	94	31.3	67	1	2	0
