= Brandywine High School =

Coordinates: 39.8002°N 75.5210°W

Location
- 1400 Foulk Road; Wilmington postal address, Delaware 19803; United States

Information
- Type: Public
- Established: 1958 (68 years ago)
- School district: Brandywine School District
- CEEB code: 080158
- Principal: Rebecca Reggio
- Teaching staff: 63.5 (FTE)
- Grades: 9–12
- Enrollment: 941 (2023-2024)
- Student to teacher ratio: 13.84
- Colors: Blue and white
- Athletics conference: Blue Hen Conference - Flight B
- Mascot: Bulldog
- Newspaper: The Brandywine Line
- Yearbook: Azurean
- Website: brandywine.brandywineschools.org

Brandywine High School is a public secondary school located near Talleys Corner in unincorporated New Castle County, Delaware, United States, with a Wilmington postal address. Although the school is not within the Wilmington city limits, it does serve some parts of the city north of the Brandywine River. Its boundary also includes much of Claymont census-designated place, and parts of the Edgemoor CDP. It is a part of the Brandywine School District.

There were 940 students enrolled in the fall for the 2020–2021 school year. Rebecca Reggio is the current principal.

== History ==
Brandywine High School was established in 1958. Its building was designed by Wilmington architects Whiteside, Moeckel & Carbonell in the International Style and completed in 1959.

== Athletics ==
Brandywine is a member of the Delaware Interscholastic Athletic Association (DIAA). The Bulldogs compete in Flight B of the Blue Hen Conference with a full slate of teams in all three sports seasons:

Brandywine's sports include cross country, field hockey, football, soccer, volleyball, cheerleading, basketball, swimming, wrestling, cheerleading, indoor track, baseball, softball, golf, lacrosse, tennis, and track and field.

== Recognitions ==
In 2021, U.S. News & World Report ranked Brandywine #5,392 out of almost 24,000 public schools across the United States, and Niche ranked it in the top 50% best public schools for athletes in New Castle County.

The school was recognized by the Blue Ribbon Schools Program for the 1982–1983 school year.

== Appearances in media ==
- First lady Jill Biden spoke from the classroom in which she formerly taught (room 232) for her remote address to the 2020 Democratic National Convention. Her husband Joe Biden was in the high school at the moment he formally was nominated for president during the convention.

== Notable alumni ==
- Dexter Boney, former basketball player in the National Basketball Association and Continental Basketball Association
- Dennis Brockenborough, trumpet player for the Mighty Mighty Bosstones 1990–2000
- John Gallagher Jr., Tony Award-winning actor best known for Spring Awakening
- Joan Goodfellow, film, television, and stage actress; mezzo-soprano
- Sean Patrick Thomas, actor
- George Thorogood, musician known for hits such as "Bad to the Bone"
- Christopher Voigt, synthetic biology pioneer and MIT professor
- Ben Warheit, Emmy-nominated actor, comedian, and writer, Late Night with Seth Meyers
- Lori Van Sickle, professional golfer
- Steven Hall, recording artist known professionally as Nirosta Steel

== Notable faculty ==
- Jill Biden, Second Lady of the United States 2009–2017, First Lady of the United States 2021–present
