= Aiken's Tavern Historic District =

Historic district in Delaware, US

- U.S. National Register of Historic Places
- U.S. Historic district
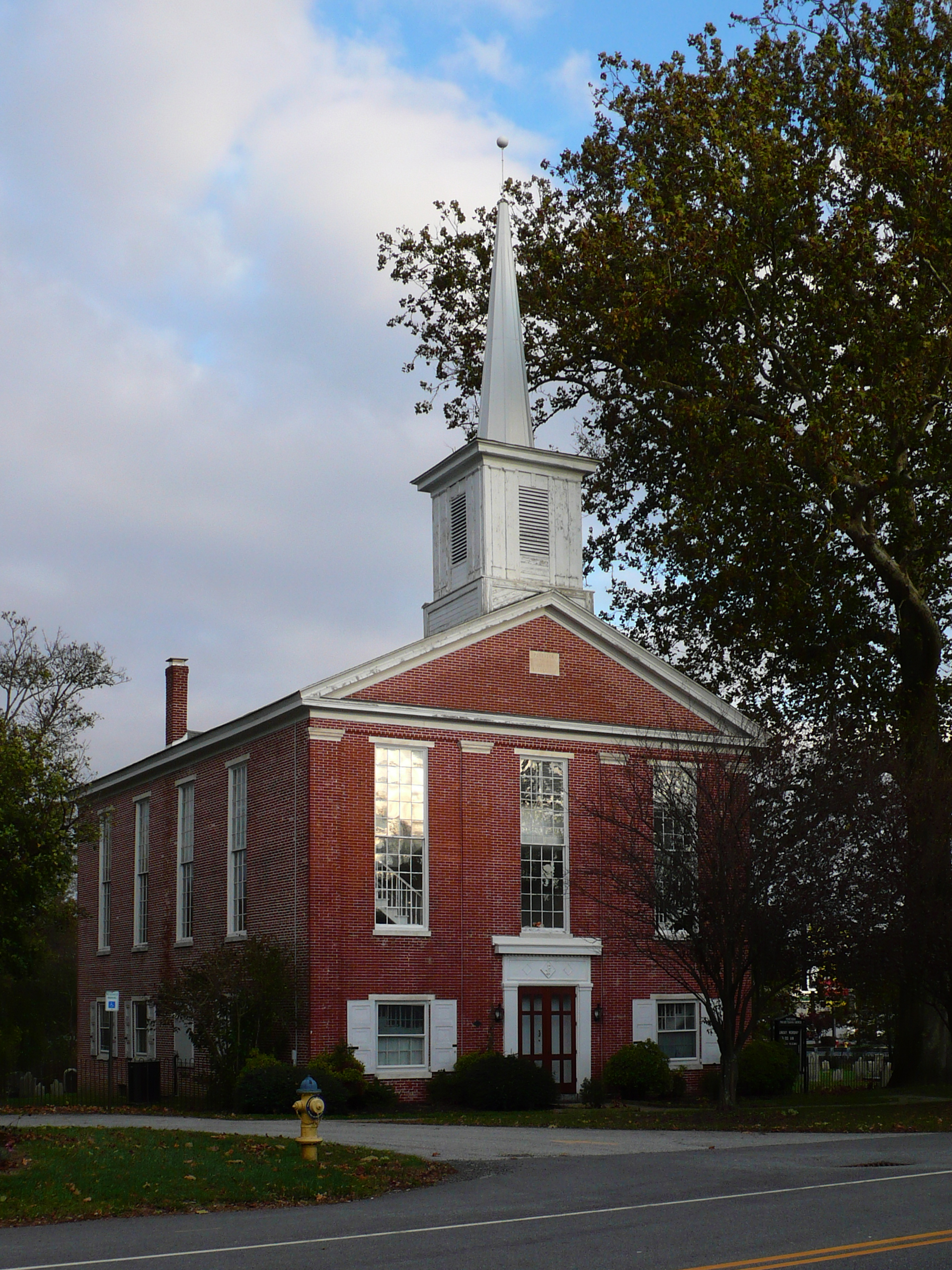
- Pencader Presbyterian Church, November 2012

- Location within Delaware Location within the United States
- Location: U.S. 40 and Glasgow Ave., Glasgow, Delaware
- Coordinates: 39°36′23″N 75°44′45″W
- Area: 4.5 acres (1.8 ha)
- Architectural style: Federal, Italianate
- NRHP reference No.: 77000388
- Added to NRHP: December 6, 1977

Aiken's Tavern Historic District is a historic district in New Castle County, Delaware, United States. It comprises the historic center of the village of Glasgow. The district includes the site of Aiken's Tavern, an important landmark at the time of the American Revolutionary War. The district was listed on the National Register of Historic Places in 1977.

== Location ==
The district is located just west of the intersection of U.S. Route 40 and Delaware Route 896. Its boundaries encompass a 300-yard (270 m) stretch of Glasgow Avenue, mostly to the north of U.S. 40 but also including the Mechanic's Row block in the median of the highway.

== History ==
The village of Glasgow developed at what was and still is an important crossroads in Pencader Hundred. The area was initially settled as part of the 30,000-acre (12,000 ha) Welsh Tract granted to a group of settlers from Wales in 1701, and a Presbyterian church was established shortly thereafter. A tavern was also built and became known as Aiken's Tavern after one of its owners. During the American Revolution, British forces under William Howe occupied the village following the September 1777 Battle of Cooch's Bridge, setting up their headquarters in the tavern and establishing a temporary field hospital at Pencader Church.

The crossroads grew increasingly busy after the completion of the New Castle and Frenchtown Turnpike (since replaced by U.S. Route 40) in 1818, and many of the surviving buildings in the historic district date from approximately the same era. The tavern itself was demolished in 1832.

== Inventory ==
Named contributing properties in the district include

- Pencader Presbyterian Church, built on the site of an earlier church building in 1852, and an adjacent frame house
- The Middleton House, built sometime before 1818, and a nearby frame shop building
- Mechanic's Row, a block of houses built around 1810
- A three-story brick house listed as the "Manse" (c. 1850)

Two other contributing properties, Glasgow Methodist Church and a second frame house located near Pencader Church, are no longer standing.

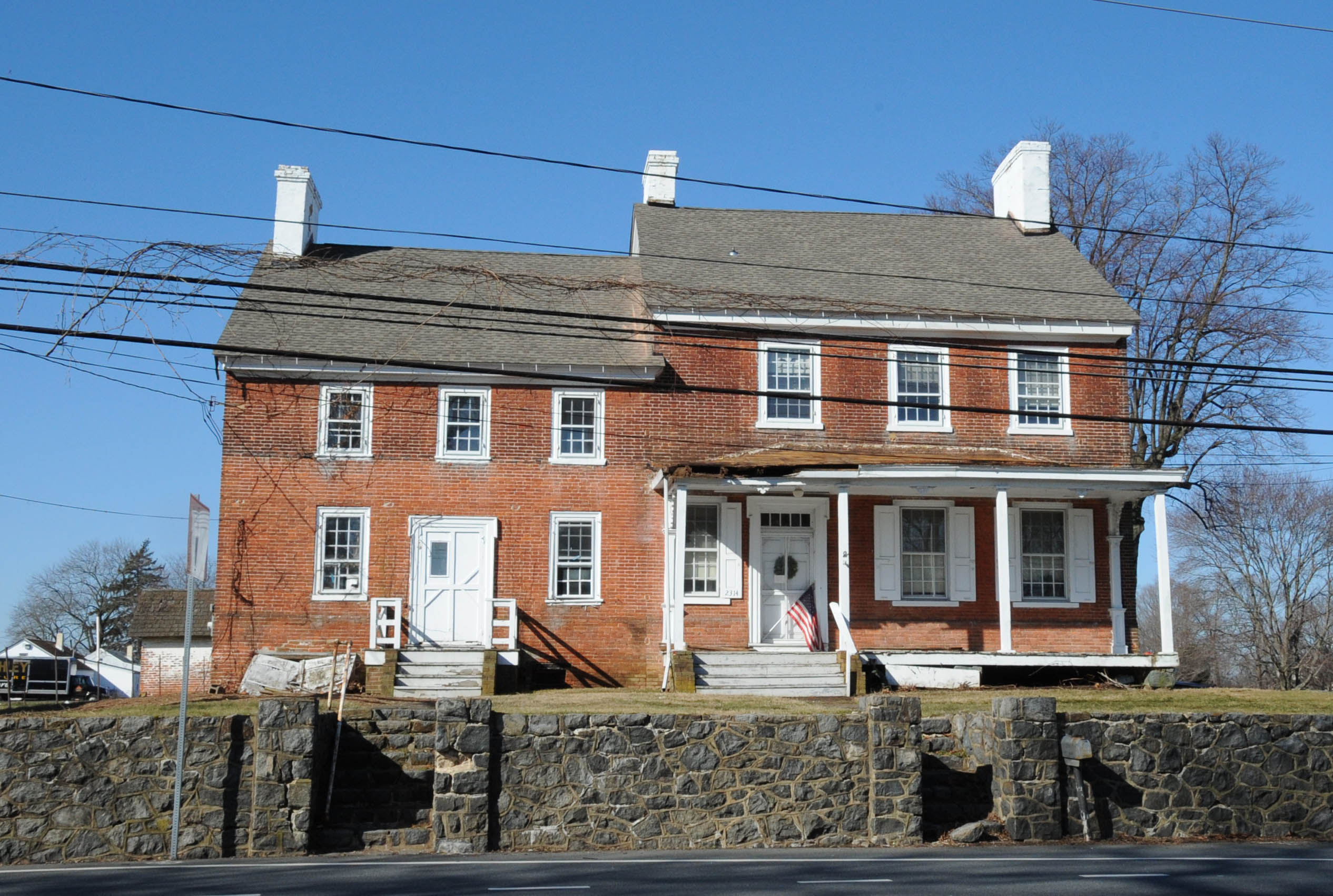
Middleton House
