= William W.M. Henry Comprehensive High School =

Segregated school in Delaware, United States

Coordinates: 39.1613°N 75.5404°W

William W.M. Henry Comprehensive High School was a segregated public high school for African-Americans in Dover, Delaware. It was a part of William W. M. Henry Comprehensive High School District 133. Its namesake was a doctor named William W. M. Henry.

It opened, along with William C. Jason Comprehensive High School in Georgetown in Sussex County and Louis L. Redding Comprehensive High School in Middletown in New Castle County, as a part of a system of high schools for African-Americans in Delaware.

== History ==
The school was created as there was an anticipated rise in the number of African-Americans in the state, and the purpose of this school was to provide education to students in the southernmost parts of the state. In 1947, the Delaware General Assembly made the decision to create the school.

In 1949, the authorities planning the school chose its location. The school began to be built in 1951, and began operations in September 1952. The school had multiple tracks for different career paths. Brett Gadsden, author of Between North and South: Delaware, Desegregation, and the Myth of American Sectionalism, compared the philosophy of the school to those of Hampton University and Tuskeegee Institute.

On June 30, 1966, the school ceased operations as the state was desegregating the school system. The Dover school district took possession of the building. William Henry Middle School began operations in 1967. The Capital School District (now the school district of Dover) uses the property as the William Henry Campus.

The State of Delaware installed a historical marker for the school in 2003.

== See also ==
- Howard High School of Technology - Formerly Howard High School, a segregated high school for African-Americans in Wilmington
