= Delcastle Technical High School =

Location
- 1417 Newport Road; Newport, Delaware 19804; United States; 39°43′35″N 75°37′38″W

Information
- Type: Vo-tech public high school
- Established: 1969 (57 years ago)
- School district: New Castle County Vocational-Technical School District
- CEEB code: 080170
- Principal: Frank Hanson
- Teaching staff: 123.03 (FTE)
- Grades: 9–12
- Enrollment: 1,598 (2023-2024)
- Student to teacher ratio: 12.99
- Campus type: Suburban
- Colors: Navy blue and white
- Athletics conference: Blue Hen Conference – Flight A
- Team name: Cougars
- Yearbook: The Artisan
- Website: delcastle.nccvt.k12.de.us

Delcastle Technical High School is a public vocational-technical high school in unincorporated New Castle County, Delaware, near Wilmington, and is the largest of four high schools within the New Castle County Vocational-Technical School District, which includes Howard High School of Technology in Wilmington, Hodgson Vo-Tech High School in Glasgow, and St. Georges Technical High School in St. Georges. It houses the administrative offices of its respective school district.

== History ==
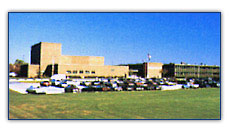
Delcastle Technical High School

Delcastle opened in the fall of 1969 as the New Castle County Vocational-Technical School in response to an increased demand for vocational schools in Delaware. As the county's only vocational-technical high school, it was overwhelmingly popular; by 1971, they were receiving applications from more than three times the number of students they had capacity for. By 1973, the county began planning three additional vocational-technical schools to help handle the extreme interest in Delcastle.

== Academics ==
In addition to 10 credits within their chosen program, Delcastle students must meet Delaware core standards: 4 credits of English and math; 3 science and social studies credits; 2 language credits; 1 physical education credit; and 0.5 health credits. Each of the career programs has its own required courses, which allows students to gain the most contextual education possible. Ninth grade students have the opportunity to do rotations in different career areas so they can find the best fit.

There are 24 career programs separated into six distinct areas at Delcastle:

- Business, Communication, and Computers: Business Technology; Digital Media; Graphic Arts; and IT Academy
- Construction Technologies: Carpentry; Electrical Trades; Heating Ventilation & AC; Plumbing; Sheet Metal Fabrication; and Welding/Fabrication Technology
- Health Services: Biomedical Science & Allied Health; Dental Assisting; Medical Assisting; Nursing Technology; and Surgical Technology
- Public and Consumer Services: Cosmetology; Culinary Arts; Production & Imaging Technology; and the Teacher Academy for K-12
- Science, Energy, and Drafting Technologies: Chemical Lab Technology and Technical Drafting & Design
- Transportation: Auto Body; Auto-Technology; and Aviation Technology

Delcastle also has partnerships with higher education institutions such as Delaware Technical and Community College, University of Delaware, Wilmington University so students can earn dual enrollment credits as well. In 2017, more than 90% of those enrolled in college courses finished them successfully.

== Athletics ==
Delcastle is part of the Delaware Interscholastic Athletic Association and compete in Blue Hen Conference, Flight "A".

== Notable alumni ==
- Briean Boddy-Calhoun, free agent in the NFL
- Dionna Harris, softball player
- Bill Johnson, former MLB pitcher for the Chicago Cubs
