= Bubby Sadler =

American baseball player

- Shortstop
- Born: February 28, 1909; Delaware City, Delaware, U.S.
- Died: November 10, 1987 (aged 78); Delaware City, Delaware, U.S.
- Threw: Right

Negro league baseball debut
- 1934, for the Bacharach Giants

Last appearance
- 1944, for the Atlanta Black Crackers

Teams
- Bacharach Giants (1934); Brooklyn Eagles (1935); Philadelphia Bacharach Giants (1936); Washington Black Senators (1938); Atlanta Black Crackers (1944)

William Andrew Sadler (February 28, 1909 – November 10, 1987), alternately spelled "Saddler", and nicknamed "Bubby", was an American Negro league baseball shortstop between 1934 and 1944.

== Early life and career ==
A native of Delaware City, Delaware, Sadler graduated from Howard High School. He broke in to the Negro leagues in 1934 with the Bacharach Giants as a power-hitting shortstop, and went on to play for the Brooklyn Eagles the following season.

Sadler died in Delaware City in 1987 at age 78, and was inducted into the Delaware Sports Museum and Hall of Fame in 1999.
