= La Grange (Glasgow, Delaware) =

Historic house in Delaware, United States

- U.S. National Register of Historic Places
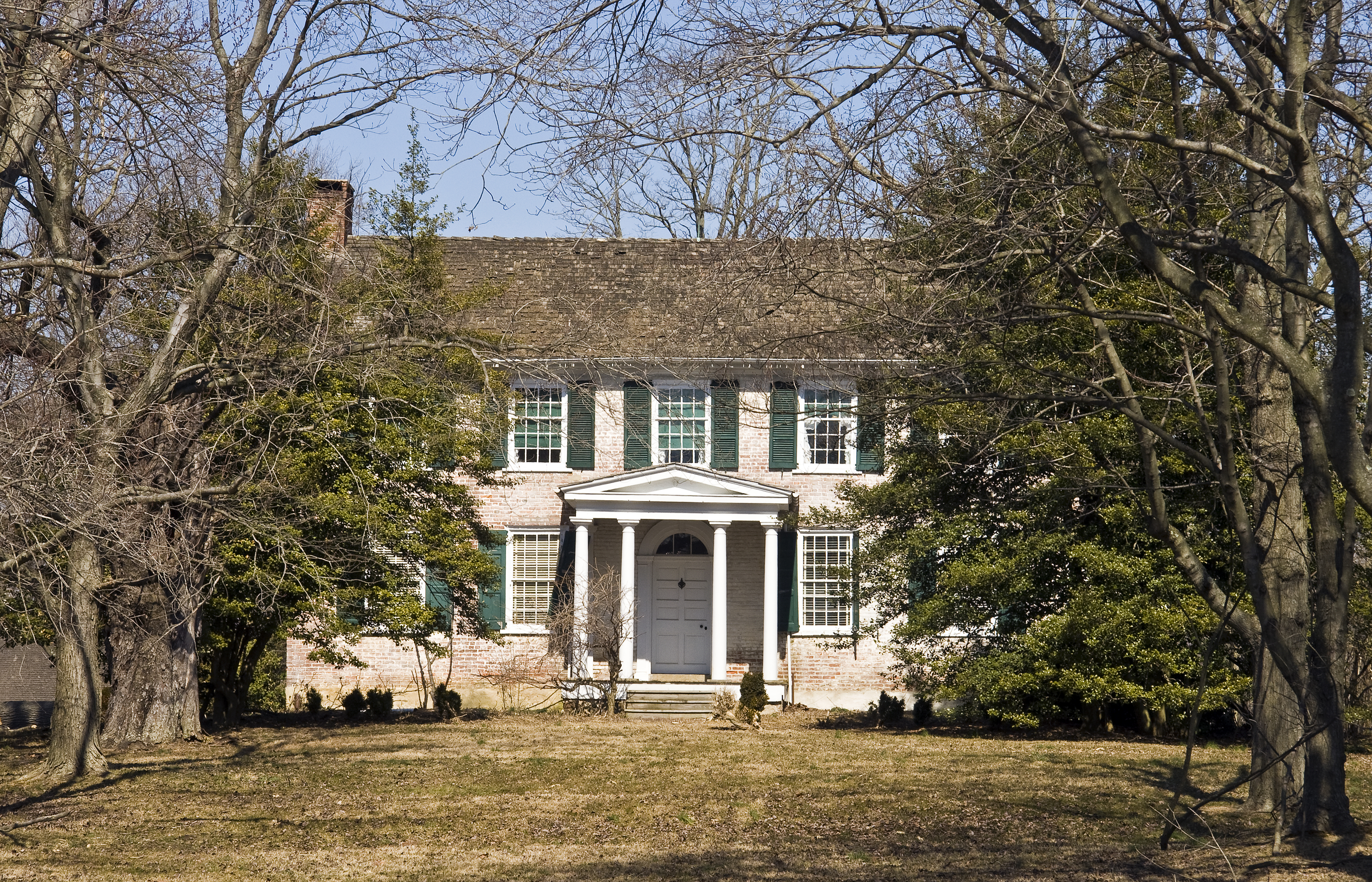
- La Grange, March 2010

- Location within Delaware Location within the United States
- Location: 2467 Pulaski Highway, Glasgow, Delaware
- Coordinates: 39.60620°N 75.74842°W
- Area: 5 acres (2.0 ha)
- Built: 1815
- Architectural style: Federal
- NRHP reference No.: 74000601
- Added to NRHP: July 10, 1974

La Grange, also known as Samuel Henry Black House, is a historic home located near Glasgow, New Castle County, Delaware. It was built in 1815, and is a two-story, five-bay, Federal style manor house. The front facade features a pedimented entrance portico. Attached to the house are two dependencies. The western wing is a former smokehouse and the eastern wing is a kitchen.

It was added to the National Register of Historic Places in 1974.
