= William C. Jason Comprehensive High School =

Segregated school in Delaware, United States

Coordinates: 38.6972°N 75.4117°W

William C. Jason Comprehensive High School was a segregated public school for African-Americans in Georgetown, Delaware. Its namesake was William C. Jason, and it was the first high school for African-Americans in Sussex County. It was operated by William C. Jason Comprehensive High School District 192.

It opened, along with William W.M. Henry Comprehensive High School in Dover in Kent County and Louis L. Redding Comprehensive High School in Middletown in New Castle County, as a part of a system of high schools for African-Americans in Delaware.

== History ==
The school was created as there was an anticipated rise in the number of African-Americans in the state, and the purpose of this school was to provide education to students in the southernmost parts of the state.

In 1950 it started operations as a senior high school. Sussex County African-Americans, prior to that time, had to go to Howard High School in Wilmington, the high school of Delaware State College in Dover to get a high school education, with some small institutions having some upper level classes. A complete high school education would mean living in Wilmington or Dover.

James R. Webb was the first principal. Brett Gadsden, author of Between North and South: Delaware, Desegregation, and the Myth of American Sectionalism, compared the philosophy of the school to those of Hampton University and Tuskeegee Institute.

Junior high school grades began operations in 1953. Webb's time as principal ended in 1962.

Desegregation occurred after Jason High stopped operating in 1967. James Diehl, who wrote a book about Sussex County, stated that multiple Jason alumni shared positive memories about the school. After the closure, Delaware Technical and Community College began using the campus. A historical marker from the state government was established in 1996. The Jason Alumni Association, headed by Janie Miller as of 2024, keeps historical records related to the school.

== See also ==
- Howard High School of Technology - Formerly Howard High School, a segregated high school for African-Americans in Wilmington
