= Pauline A. Young =

African-American teacher, librarian, community activist

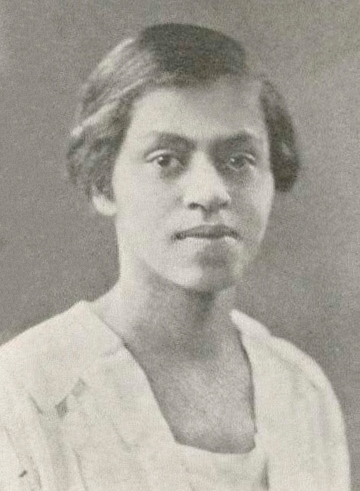
- Pauline A. Young College Yearbook Photo
- Born: August 17, 1900; West Medford, Massachusetts, U.S.
- Died: June 26, 1991 (aged 90); Wilmington, Delaware, U.S.
- Occupations: Teacher, librarian, historian, lecturer, community activist, and humanitarian.
- Parents: James Ross Young (father); Mary Leila Young (mother)
- Relatives: Ethel Corinne Young (sister); Leila Ruth Young (sister); Laurence T. Young (brother)

Pauline Alice Young (August 17, 1900 – June 26, 1991) was an African-American teacher, librarian, historian, lecturer, community activist, humanitarian, and individualist.

== Early life and education ==
Pauline A. Young was born in West Medford, Massachusetts to James Ross Young and Mary Leila Young. Her father was a prominent caterer, and her mother was an English teacher. Young had three other siblings including a younger brother, Laurence T., and two older sisters, Ethel Corinne and Leila Ruth. When Pauline was still a child, her father deserted while the family was still living in Massachusetts. Her family moved to Wilmington, Delaware shortly after to be closer to her mother's family. There, she was raised by three "parents"—her mother, grandmother, and her aunt. Young's aunt, Alice Dunbar-Nelson, a writer, activist and poet, greatly influenced Young to follow in her footsteps, and Young considered her to be an inspiration.

Young occasionally reminisced about her childhood home, describing it as a "wayside inn and an underground railroad for visiting Negroes and white literary friends, who wouldn't go to the hotel, you know, since the hotel wouldn't admit Negroes." Among these visitors were influential activists and writers such as W. E. B. DuBois and James Weldon Johnson.

Young attended Howard High School, which was the only school for African-American students in the state of Delaware. Her mother and her aunt, the wife of author Paul Laurence Dunbar, both taught at the institution. African-American students all across Delaware were forced to bus to Wilmington because the parents of white students kept the Delaware school system segregated.

Pauline pursued further higher education at the University of Pennsylvania Graduate School of Education, where she earned a B.A. degree in History and English. Young was the only black student in her class. It is here that she participated in graduate work such as educational tests and measurements. After graduating, Young attempted to pursue an acting career. However, after three months, Young decided that life on the stage was not for her. She moved to Harpers Ferry, West Virginia, where she worked at the front desk of the black-owned Hilltop House. She did not last long at this job, moving on to teach social studies and Latin for a year at Huntington High School, an all Black school, in Newport News, Virginia. It was there that she was thrown off a bus because she did not give her seat up to a white man. In 1928, Young became a librarian at Howard High School's Stevens Memorial Library, and she eventually joined the staff of her alma mater, Howard High School, to teach History and Latin. In 1935, she received her graduate degree from the Columbia University School of Library Service. Young later taught and proctored at the University of Southern California and served as a member of the press staff at the Tuskegee Institute in Alabama. In 1942, Young completed 114 hours of ground school work and twelve hours of dual flight at the black-owned Coffey School of Aeronautics in Chicago, Illinois. During this time, in 1943, she underwent fifty hours of pre-flight instruction for teachers at Temple University and taught pre-flight at Howard's night school.

== Civic work ==
Young was a devoted lifelong member of her local and the national chapter of the NAACP. Joining at the age of 12, she served nine years as the secretary and later, she became the president of the Wilmington, Delaware branch. Young was also the chair of the Delaware NAACP education committee. During her time, she coordinated NAACP organization membership campaigns in cities such as Baltimore, Chicago, Milwaukee, and Wilmington. She volunteered with the United Service Organizations and with the Wilmington City Council on Youth as representative for the Wilmington Federation of Teachers. Young was described on several accounts as a "prolific and outspoken 'Letter-to-the Editor' writer", and she practiced journalism by writing book reviews for local papers such as The Baltimore Afro-American, The Wilson Bulletin for Librarians, and the Journal of Negro History. In addition, she frequently wrote to publishing companies such as Random House, Britannica and The News Journal Company advocating for Black correspondents and representation.

As a world traveler, Young explored places such Egypt, the (then) Soviet Union, and Germany. While in Germany, she was allotted the opportunity to greet the African-American track and field athlete Jesse Owens at the 1936 Summer Olympics in Berlin. Young also visited places such as Canada, Chicago, Maine, and the Carolinas.

Young described herself as "race conscious and militant about it." During the summer of 1935, she worked with the journalist, educator, and civil rights activist W. E. B. DuBois in a temporary office. The two were collaborating on The Negro Encyclopedia, which was to be subsidized by the Phelps Stokes Fund. Unfortunately, adequate funding was never provided.

== Activism ==
After retirement from Howard High School, Young taught as a Peace Corps volunteer in Jamaica from 1962 to 1964. There, she met Dr. Martin Luther King Jr. and took part in the 1963 March on Washington, where King gave his "I Have a Dream" speech. Young joined King's March for Equality from Selma to Montgomery on the last day. She remarked that her experience in the march was "horrible" as "some (whites) were nice very nice," but there were "nasty white people just waiting for the troops to go." Young later went on to participate in the Solidarity March in Wilmington.

Young was also an active member of the Delaware Fellowship Commission (DFC). The DFC was organized to promote better racial, religious and nationality understanding. Pauline was a founder, and she served as the secretary and chairman of the Hospital Committee. This committee specifically fought against segregated facilities and discriminatory hiring practices and fought for equal opportunity in the training of nurses.

Young once said that she fought for civil rights and against the "oppressors--corporate management," referencing the dominant white society of her time. Young replied "Oh, goodness gracious, yes!" when asked whether she was an activist or a radical. Young's motto was, "I stay mad. And I'm damn mad at any injustice."

== Written work ==
"Delaware: A History of the First State" is a three-volume Delaware history book. Young wrote a chapter in this book titled "The Negro in Delaware: Past and Present" that focused on the early history of African-Americans in the state. This work was the first comprehensive history of Black Americans in Delaware. Many scholars regularly turn to the writings because it is a source of information relating to the heritage of all aspects of Black history. In this book, Pauline addresses race relations in the state and expresses her concerns with Delaware's lack of progression. Young began her collection of data back in the 1920s. In 1947, Young finalized and published her chapter. Miss Young's chapter on Black history in Delaware continues to be the cornerstone of research in Delaware history. Up until this publication, there had not been any organized, documented chronicle of the black community.

== Interests and hobbies ==
Young played contract bridge, was a Dodgers fan, and as she once put it, bowled a "pretty good game."

=== Dunbar collection ===
Young had a great number of Dunbar materials in her possession:

- 200 letters exchanged between Alice and Paul Nelson
- Scores of published and unpublished manuscripts
- Clippings of Alice Dunbar-Nelson's columns in The Pittsburgh Courier, The Wilmington Advocate, and The Washington Eagle
- Posters and photographs
- Publications of Poet Lore, A.M.E. Church Review, Collier's, Dayton Press, Southern Workman, The Tuskegee Student, The Indianapolis World, and a few other printings

Young wanted to have the Dunbar and Dunbar-Nelson collections kept at an educational center. She wanted the collection in a "black place," so the majority of the collection went to Howard University.

=== Other collections ===
Young was a leader in preserving black history in Delaware. Young began collecting memorabilia, newspaper and magazine clippings in the 1920s. The works that she compiled focused on Black history specifically related to Delaware. Young also documented black family histories. When asked about how her collection began Young said, "I just started out saving whatever I could get my hands on." Her extensive collection was considered to contain works of scholarly importance. After she retired, students interested in Black history came to her for sources and information.

== Later life and death ==
Young served at Howard High over a span of 36 years, from 1919 until her retirement in 1955. Shortly after her retirement, she helped found the American Federation of Teachers. In 1957, she won $700 on the television quiz game show Tic-Tac-Dough. At the age of 62, Young joined the Peace Corps, serving in Jamaica for two years, where she helped train librarians and staff members. For three months, she served as a librarian of the Jamaican Scientific Research Council. It was here that she worked on the Jamaican library's first indexing system, where there were over 80,000 books that needed cataloging. She described her experience as "marvelous for me as a Negro to see where discrimination is non-existent and offense is not taken at the mention of a person's racial characteristics." Upon returning to the states, she kept busy by lecturing and substitute teaching. In 1968, she taught an Afro-American history course at the Central YMCA in Wilmington, Delaware. This class was free to all residents of the inner-city.

Young was admitted to the hospital for surgery in May 1991. Young was only home for two weeks before being re-hospitalized on June 22. Young died at the age of 90, on June 26, 1991, in the Wilmington Hospital.

== Literary archives ==
The Atlanta University Center Robert W. Woodruff Library Archive Research Center houses the Pauline A. Young papers (1903-1991) which contains correspondence, articles and essays, photographs, programs and brochures, biographical materials, and scrapbooks and other personal items. The University of Delaware Special Collections Department holds the Pauline A. Young Collection (1924-1988) which also contains the items listed above.

== Honors, awards, and affiliations ==
- Young was a member of the Delta Sigma Theta sorority.
- 1976: Young was presented a Certificate of Recognition for participating in Delaware's Bicentennial
- 1977: Young was a recipient of the Monday Club Brotherhood of the Year Award
- 1979: Young received the Black Woman's 1979 Conference Award
- 1979: Young was presented the Howard Career Center Alumni Award
- 1979: Young's Alma mater, Howard High School, named their library's Memorabilia Room after her
- 1982: Young was honored by the Wilmington Branch of the National Association of University Women
- 1982: Young was recognized for outstanding service to the Home, the Community, the State, and the Nation and was hereby inducted to the Hall of Fame of Delaware women
- 1983: Young received a Certificate of Honorary Membership from Delaware State College's Black Studies Program
- 1983: Young received the Special Achievement Award for Education from the Brandywine Professional Association, which honors outstanding black achievers
- 1996: The University of Delaware Library renamed the residency program in honor of Young

Young has been honored by organizations such as: the Sigma Gamma Rho sorority, the Ladies of the Grand Army of the Republic, and Delta Sigma Theta sorority. In addition, she has been recognized by the Monday Club, the New Hope Baptist Church, and many other local professional and community groups.

Young influenced many great minds in Delaware, and many students reached out to her for advice, help on projects and motivation.
