= Blue Hen Conference =

The Blue Hen Conference is a high school sports conference comprising public schools in New Castle County, Delaware. It is subdivided by size into two flights:

== Flight A ==
- Alexis I. duPont High School
- Appoquinimink High School
- Concord High School
- Delcastle Technical High School
- Glasgow High School
- Middletown High School
- Mount Pleasant High School
- William Penn High School

== Flight B ==
- Brandywine High School
- Christiana High School
- John Dickinson High School
- Hodgson Vo-Tech High School
- Howard High School of Technology
- St. Georges Technical High School
- Thomas McKean High School
- Newark High School
