= New Castle Christian Academy =

Location
- 901 E. Basin Rd. New Castle, Delaware; United States

Information
- Type: Private Christian
- Established: 1965
- Closed: 2010
- Administrator: Mark Unruh
- Grades: K-12
- Enrollment: <150
- Colors: Maroon, Gold
- Website: nccade.com

New Castle Christian Academy (N.C.C.A.), formerly New Castle Baptist Academy (N.C.B.A.) was a K-12 private Christian school located in New Castle, Delaware. N.C.C.A. was established as New Castle Baptist Academy in 1965 by the members of First Baptist Church of Delaware. A notable alumnus of N.C.C.A., then New Castle Baptist Academy, is Ryan Phillippe. The beginning of New Castle Christian Academy's decline can be traced to 2008 with one of its smallest graduating classes, consisting of only 5 students. N.C.C.A. closed in the summer of 2010, transferring use of its building to the former Tall Oaks Classical School.
