= William C. Jason =

American college president and minister (1859–1943)

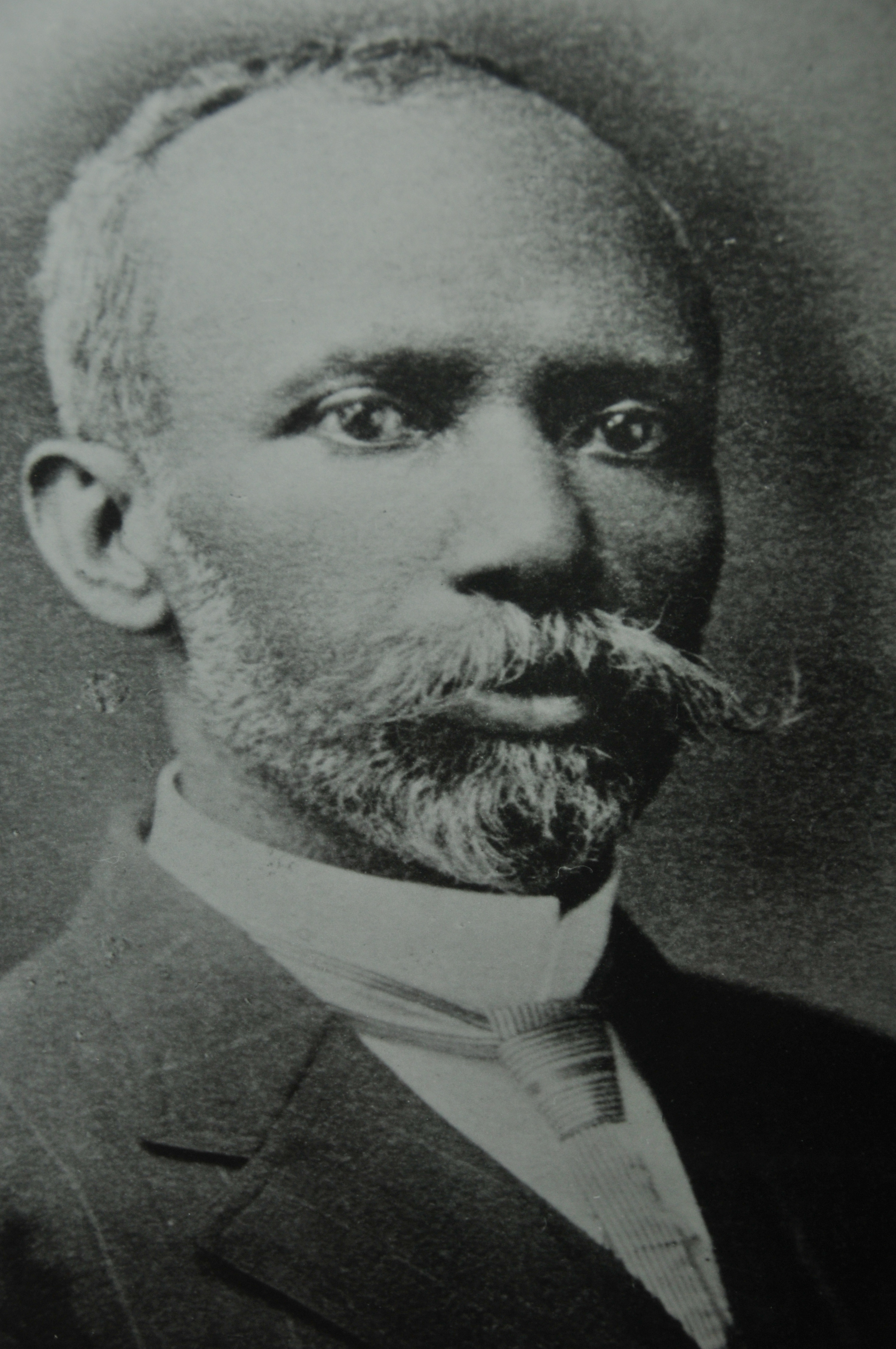
- Born: October 21, 1859; Trappe, Maryland
- Died: July 8, 1943 (aged 83)
- Office: Second President of the State College for Colored Students (now Delaware State University) (1895–1923)

William C. Jason (October 21, 1859 – July 8, 1943) was an American college president and minister. He is the longest serving president (1895 to 1923) in the history of Delaware State University, a historically black institution of higher education. In assuming the leadership of the fledging college in only the fourth year of its operation, Jason's long tenure provided much stability to the institution and many of the typical college activities were begun under his watch.

== Education ==
Jason was born on October 21, 1859, in Trappe, Maryland. In his young adult years, he earned a Bachelor of Divinity and a Master of Arts, both from Allegheny College in Meadville, Pennsylvania. He became a minister of the Methodist Church, through which he served in assignments in Orange, New Jersey, Wilmington, Delaware, and Philadelphia, Pennsylvania.

== Academic career ==
The Board of Trustees of the State College for Colored Students (SCCS; now Delaware State University) selected Jason as its second president on July 11, 1895, succeeding inaugural President Wesley Webb, who had led the college since its 1891 establishment. It was upon his appointment as president that the Methodist Church granted him a leave of absence from his ministerial duties.

Jason’s presidency inherited the oversight of a 95-acre campus two miles north of the state capital of Dover, Delaware. The college property contained a Main College Building, a Trades Building and a President’s Residence. During the first year of his leadership, the college had only three faculty members – which included Jason, who taught Greek, Latin, Mental and Moral Science, as well as English Classics. The college teaching corps would grow to as many as 11 faculty members during his tenure

The enrollment in the fall of 1895 was 18 students in the college and 10 students in the preparatory school, the latter of which had been established by his predecessor. During his tenure, the college enrollment increased to as many as 100 students. Three years after Jason became president, the college celebrated its first two four-year graduates in 1898. During his presidency, 160 four-year degrees were awarded.

The ongoing challenges for Jason – especially during his first four years – was inadequate funding from the Delawars government to support what was the First State’s only public institution of higher education (the University of Delaware had not yet achieved state-assisted status).

The two most significant accomplishments by Jason were the development of the college’s agriculture program and the establishment of a Normal School (teachers' education program). Devoting part of the campus to farming provided hands-on education for students majoring in agriculture, grew produce to help feed the college community, and earned a modest revenue from surplus sold on the market. The Normal School represented the beginning of the college’s legacy of producing teachers for the Delaware school system and beyond.

Nine additional building were added to the campus under Jason’s tenure – a women’s dormitory, a men’s dormitory, and six farm buildings. The first-ever fundraising campaign at the college led to the construction of a chapel, constructed on the place that had previously been the site of slave quarters during the property's earlier use as a plantation during the antebellum years. Only the women’s dormitory (completed 1901) was entirely the product of state funding. A 1919 state appropriation facilitated the purchase of an adjacent 100-acre farm, which expanded the campus to just over 200 acres. An elevated water tank was also erected on the campus.

It was under Jason’s leadership that the SCCS began manifesting extracurricular activities typical of college campuses. The college’s first organized music program emerged in 1902 with the establishment of a 10-piece brass band. The SCCS’s first football and baseball teams were fielded during the 1905-1906 school year, and men’s basketball and track were played for the first time in 1912. With the acquisition of printing equipment, the first student newspaper The Echo was first published in 1909. A literary society]] and a Young People's Society of Christian Endeavour were founded circa the 1906-1907 school year.

In late 1915, the SCCS was found by the federal government to fall short of the requirements of the Morrill Act of 1890, the federal legislation that brought about the establishment of the college, especially in the areas of agriculture and industrial trades training. This prompted a discontinuation of those four-year degrees after the spring of 1916 and led Jason to submit his resignation in 1916. However, Jason rescinded the resignation and would continue as the president of the institution until his retirement in 1923. Although the SCCS continued to award Normal School degrees and operate a preparatory school, the offering of four-year degree programs would not resume until 1933.

== Post-academic career ==
After his 1923 retirement, the Board of Trustees awarded him the title of President Emeritus. He returned to his Methodist vocation, serving in a number pastor and associate pastor positions in churches in Delaware and Maryland. He would, however, return to the SCCS in 1936 to serve as the campus chaplain until failing health forced his to step down from that role in 1941.

Jason died on July 8, 1943, in Dover, Delaware. William C. Jason Comprehensive High School, a segregated high school for blacks in Sussex County, Delaware, was named after Jason in 1952. The college’s library was renamed the William C. Jason Memorial Library in 1959. The modern library that replaced it in 1975 also bears his name.
