= Louis L. Redding Comprehensive High School =

Segregated school in Delaware, United States

Coordinates: 39.4526°N 75.7101°W

Louis L. Redding Middle School was a public school for African-American students in Middletown, Delaware. Middletown School District 120 operated the school. It was one of several high schools that opened in Delaware in the mid-20th century during de jure educational segregation in the United States. Its namesake was Louis L. Redding.

It opened, along with William W.M. Henry Comprehensive High School in Dover in Kent County and William C. Jason Comprehensive High School in Georgetown in Sussex County, as a part of a system of high schools for African-Americans in Delaware.

== History ==
It opened in 1953 as a replacement for Middletown School 120-C. It was constructed next to School 120-C.

Redding had grades 1-12. It generally took students from Middletown, Odessa, and Townsend. It also covered other parts of the south of New Castle County. The enrollment was 650 in 1961.

Alfred Graham Waters was the principal. He chose to have a variety of course offerings at Redding.

The school closed in 1966, and the building was given to Middletown School District 60. It, in 1969, was repurposed as Louis L. Redding Middle School (originally Louis L. Redding Intermediate School), now operated by the Appoquinimink School District.

In 2019 the State of Delaware installed a historical marker on the former school site.

== See also ==
- Howard High School of Technology - Formerly Howard High School, a segregated high school for African-Americans in Wilmington
