= Hodgson Vo-Tech High School =

Paul M. Hodgson Vocational-Technical High School

Location
- 2575 Glasgow Ave; Newark, Delaware 19702; United States; 39°36′03″N 75°44′26″W

Information
- Type: Vo-tech public high school
- Established: 1974 (52 years ago)
- School district: New Castle County Vocational-Technical School District
- CEEB code: 080111
- Principal: Christine Colihan
- Teaching staff: 81.00 (FTE)
- Grades: 9–12
- Enrollment: 1,094 (2023-2024)
- Student to teacher ratio: 13.51
- Colors: Maroon and silver
- Athletics conference: Blue Hen Conference - Flight B
- Mascot: Silver Eagle
- Website: hodgson.nccvt.k12.de.us

Paul M. Hodgson Vocational Technical High School is a public high school in Glasgow, Delaware and is one of four vocational-technical school high schools within the New Castle County Vocational-Technical School District.

== Brief history ==
The school was conceptually established in 1974 after the overwhelming success of Delcastle Technical High School and opened in 1976 as a part of Newark Public Schools. Two years later, Hodgson became a part of the New Castle County Vocational-Technical School District.

== Academics ==
In addition to 10 credits within their chosen program, Hodgson students must meet Delaware core standards: 4 credits of English and math; 3 science and social studies credits; 2 language credits; 1 physical education credit; and 0.5 health credits. Each of the career programs has its own required courses, which allows students to gain the most contextual education possible.

There are 16 career programs separated into six distinct areas at Hodgson:

- Business, Communication, and Computers: Computer Network Administration
- Construction Technologies: Carpentry; Electrical Trades; Industrial Mechanics/Millwright Technologies; Masonry; and Plumbing
- Health Services: Dental Assisting; Health Information Technology; and Nursing Technology
- Public and Consumer Services: Cosmetology; Culinary Arts; and the Teacher Academy for Early Childhood Development
- Science, Energy, and Drafting Technologies: Academy of Manufacturing/Pre-Engineering and Technical Drafting & Design
- Transportation: Auto Body and Auto-Technology

Hodgson also has partnerships with higher education institutions such as Delaware Technical and Community College, University of Delaware, Wilmington University so students can earn dual enrollment credits as well. In 2017, more than 90% of those enrolled in college courses finished them successfully.

== Athletics ==
Hodgson is part of the Delaware Interscholastic Athletic Association and offers fourteen varsity sport teams that compete in Blue Hen Conference, Flight "A".

== Notable alumni ==
- Jamil Merrell, football player
- Bilal Nichols, NFL defensive end for the Chicago Bears
- Brandon Walter, baseball player
