= Red Lion Christian Academy =

Private Christian Preschool–12 school in Bear, Delaware, United States

Coordinates: 39.5977°N 75.6718°W

Red Lion Christian Academy (RLCA) is a private Christian Preschool–12 school in Bear, Delaware, named for its location within the Red Lion Hundred.

== History ==
A committee led by Dr. Charles F. Betters founded the school in 1980 as a Preschool–4th grade learning center. In 1997 the school started the process of becoming a full PreK-12 school. In the spring of 2002, the school held its first official commencement ceremony, commemorating their first graduate class.

== Recognition ==
Red Lion was ranked #1 in "Most Diverse Private High Schools in Delaware" and ranked within the top 30 for "Best Private K-12 Schools in Philadelphia Area" according to Niche's 2024 k12 rankings.

== Athletics ==
Red Lion is an independent member of the DIAA and supports coed interscholastic sports for its middle and high schoolers. Many students consider nearby Caravel Academy to be their athletic rival; however, historically, the matchups have heavily favored the Caravel Buccaneers.

In the 2022-2023 academic year, the Lions successfully launched an outdoor track and field program coached by former Delcastle stars such as Guawan "Smitty" Smith and Anthony Stewart, state record holders in the distance medley relay. They intend to do the same with an indoor program in the 2023-2024 academic year.

== Athletic controversy ==
In 2010 the DIAA, spearheaded by executive director Kevin Charles, launched a thorough investigation into the school's athletic programs. The investigation largely focused on Red Lion's powerhouse football team, led by 13-year-old USC commit David Sills at quarterback. With a need for change evident, the school was temporarily absorbed by a local church and the controversy quietly died, along with their football team. The Lions have since completely rebuilt their programs and with changes in athletic coordinators, operate cleanly.

== Diploma program & sub-campuses ==
Red Lion is considered the mother school of Reach Christian Schools, a collective of local, private Christian schools. Of the sub-schools, the largest is Glasgow Christian Academy, a homeschool co-op program, where students can obtain Red Lion Christian Academy diplomas through an Ogletown campus. These students can also participate in Red Lion's athletic programs just like any regular students.
