= Glasgow, Delaware =

Census-designated place in Delaware, United States

- CDP
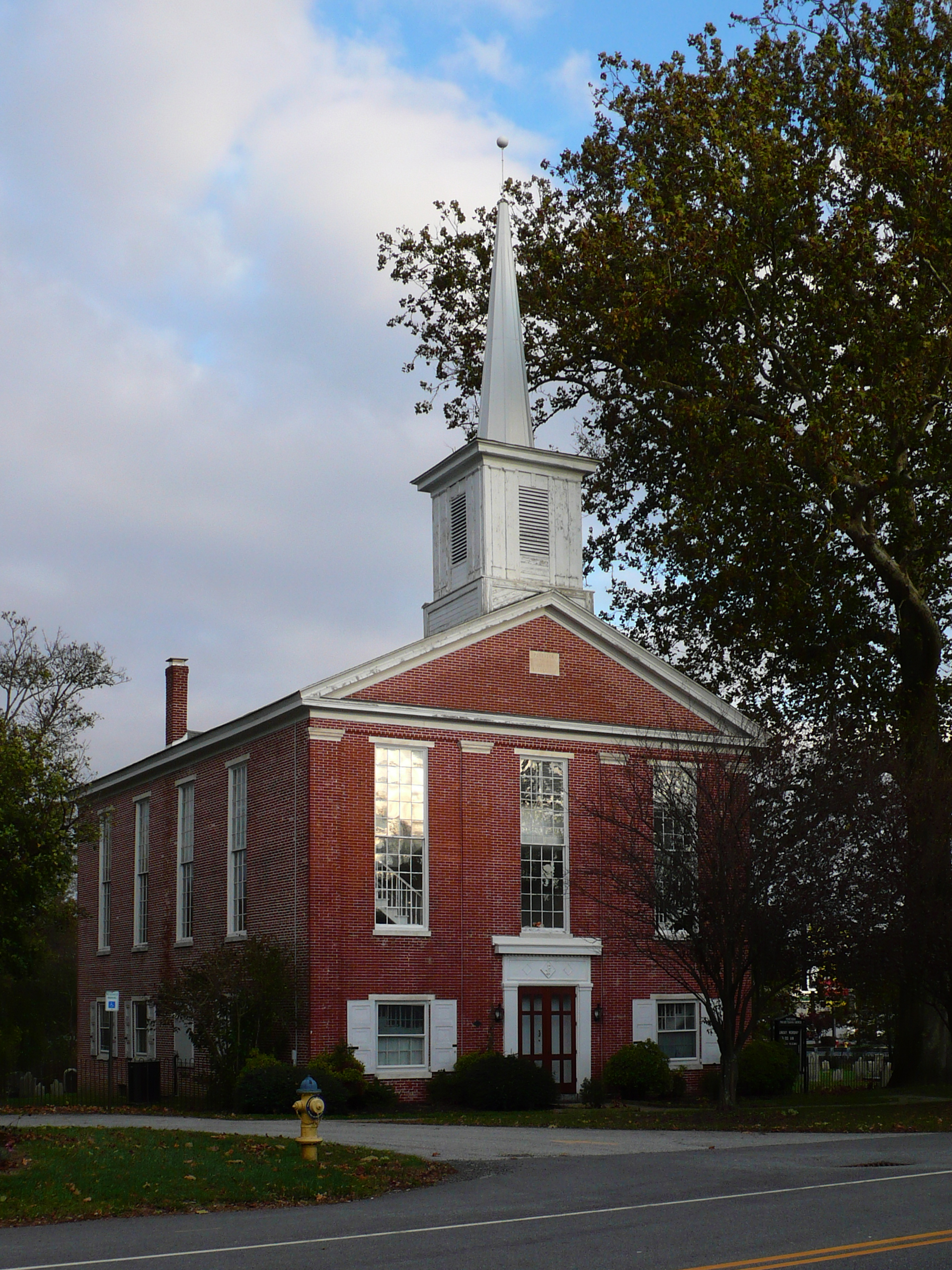
- Aiken's Tavern Historic District

- Location in New Castle County and the state of Delaware.

- Location within the state of Delaware Glasgow (the United States)
- Coordinates: 39°36′17″N 75°44′43″W
- Country: United States
- State: Delaware
- County: New Castle

Area
  - Total: 9.93 sq mi (25.71 km^{2})
  - Land: 9.93 sq mi (25.71 km^{2})
  - Water: 0 sq mi (0.00 km^{2})
- Elevation: 69 ft (21 m)

Population (2020)
  - Total: 15,288
  - Density: 1,540.3/sq mi (594.71/km^{2})
- Time zone: UTC-5 (Eastern (EST))
  - Summer (DST): UTC-4 (EDT)
- Area code: 302
- FIPS code: 10-29350
- GNIS feature ID: 214002

Glasgow is a census-designated place (CDP) in New Castle County, Delaware, United States. The population was 15,288 at the 2020 census.

== History ==
During the American Revolution, it was known as Aikentown, named after tavern owner Matthew Aiken. The town was renamed by Scottish settlers after the city in Scotland. La Grange and the James Stewart House are listed on the National Register of Historic Places.

== Geography ==
Glasgow is located at 39°36′17″N 75°44′43″W (39.6048338, -75.7452119).

According to the United States Census Bureau, the CDP has a total area of 9.9 square miles (26 km^{2}), all land.

== Demographics ==
Historical population
Census	Pop.	Note	%±
2000	12,840		—
2010	14,303		11.4%
2020	15,288		6.9%

=== 2020 census ===
As of the 2020 census, Glasgow had a population of 15,288. The median age was 40.3 years. 21.5% of residents were under the age of 18 and 13.4% of residents were 65 years of age or older. For every 100 females there were 92.3 males, and for every 100 females age 18 and over there were 90.1 males age 18 and over.

99.1% of residents lived in urban areas, while 0.9% lived in rural areas.

There were 5,555 households in Glasgow, of which 35.2% had children under the age of 18 living in them. Of all households, 55.5% were married-couple households, 13.7% were households with a male householder and no spouse or partner present, and 23.9% were households with a female householder and no spouse or partner present. About 18.8% of all households were made up of individuals and 6.9% had someone living alone who was 65 years of age or older.

There were 5,676 housing units, of which 2.1% were vacant. The homeowner vacancy rate was 0.5% and the rental vacancy rate was 4.8%.

Racial composition as of the 2020 census
Race	Number	Percent
White	7,953	52.0%
Black or African American	4,309	28.2%
American Indian and Alaska Native	53	0.3%
Asian	1,299	8.5%
Native Hawaiian and Other Pacific Islander	2	0.0%
Some other race	518	3.4%
Two or more races	1,154	7.5%
Hispanic or Latino (of any race)	1,221	8.0%

=== 2000 census ===
As of the census of 2000, there were 12,840 people, 4,517 households, and 3,478 families living in the CDP. The population density was 1,297.6 inhabitants per square mile (501.0/km^{2}). There were 4,629 housing units at an average density of 467.8 per square mile (180.6/km^{2}). The racial makeup of the CDP was 77.98% White, 17.02% African American, 0.22% Native American, 2.33% Asian, 0.02% Pacific Islander, 1.06% from other races, and 1.37% from two or more races. Hispanic or Latino of any race were 3.01% of the population.

There were 4,517 households, out of which 44.5% had children under the age of 18 living with them, 62.9% were married couples living together, 10.7% had a female householder with no husband present, and 23.0% were non-families. 16.0% of all households were made up of individuals, and 2.0% had someone living alone who was 65 years of age or older. The average household size was 2.84 and the average family size was 3.22.

In the CDP, the population was spread out, with 29.3% under the age of 18, 8.5% from 18 to 24, 37.9% from 25 to 44, 20.2% from 45 to 64, and 4.2% who were 65 years of age or older. The median age was 31 years. For every 100 females, there were 98.0 males. For every 100 females age 18 and over, there were 93.2 males.

The median income for a household in the CDP was $61,707, and the median income for a family was $67,252. Males had a median income of $42,788 versus $33,183 for females. The per capita income for the CDP was $24,795. About 2.5% of families and 3.9% of the population were below the poverty line, including 5.2% of those under age 18 and none of those age 65 or over.

== Education ==
Most of Glasgow is part of the Christina School District while a small portion is in the Appoquinimink School District.

The Christina district section is divided between Brader, Keene, and West Park elementary schools. The Christina district section is zoned to Gauger/Cobbs Middle School, and Glasgow High School. In the Appoquinimink section, students are zoned to Cedar Lane Early Childhood Center, Olive B. Loss and Crystal Run Elementary schools, Alfred G. Waters Middle School, and Appoquinimink High School.

Hodgson Vo-Tech High School of the New Castle County Vocational-Technical School District is in Glasgow.

Previously Glasgow was in the Newark School District. That district merged into the New Castle County School District in 1978. That district was divided into four districts, among them the Christina district, in 1981.
