= St. Georges Technical High School =

Location
- 555 Hyett's Corner Rd; Middletown, Delaware 19709; United States; 39°31′42″N 75°40′00″W

Information
- Type: Voc-tech public high school
- Established: 2008 (18 years ago)
- School district: New Castle County Vocational-Technical School District
- CEEB code: 080096
- Principal: Justin Comegys (2024—present)
- Teaching staff: 78.00 (FTE)
- Grades: 9–12
- Enrollment: 1,188 (2023–2024)
- Student to teacher ratio: 15.23
- Campus type: Urban
- Colors: Blue and green
- Athletics conference: Blue Hen Conference – Flight A
- Mascot: Hawks
- Website: stgeorges.nccvt.k12.de.us

St. Georges Technical High School is a public vocational-technical high school in unincorporated St. George's Hundred, Delaware, northeast of Middletown. It has over 1,100 students in grades 9–12 with a student-teacher ratio of 14 to 1. If desired, students at St. Georges can follow a Business, Communication, and Computers (IT Academy, web and print technology); Construction Technologies (carpentry; electrical trades; heating, ventilation & AC; plumbing); Health Services (athletic healthcare, emergency medical services, health information technology, medical assisting, nursing technology); Public and Consumer Services (culinary arts, the Teacher Academy for Early Childhood Education); Science, Energy, and Drafting Technologies (biotechnology, technical drafting & design); or Transportation (auto technology) pathway. Students typically graduate with some form of certificate in addition to their diploma.

== History ==
St. Georges began instruction in fall 2006 and spent the first two months sharing space with Delcastle Technical High School at its Marshallton location while construction of its own building was completed. The first senior class graduated in 2010.

== Notable alumni ==
- Bones Hyland, professional basketball player
