= New Castle County Vocational-Technical School District =

School district in Delaware, United States

Coordinates: 39°43′33″N 75°37′35″W

New Castle County Vocational-Technical School District (NCCVTSD or NCC Vo-Tech) is a public vocational-technical school district serving New Castle County, Delaware. Its headquarters are located at Delcastle Technical High School, in an unincorporated area in the county.

Each year, one-fourth of all eighth-grade students attending New Castle County public schools apply for admission to a vo-tech high school. Students who are accepted begin in a ninth grade exploratory program, which exposes them to career options before they elect a specific course of study. They are able to choose to study one of 42 different careers in one of six clusters: Business, Communications, and Computers; Construction Technologies; Health Services; Public and Consumer Services; Science, Energy, and Drafting Technologies; and Transportation.

== Schools ==
The district boasts four institutions, each with unique career programs and extracurricular activities.

New Castle County Vo-Tech High Schools
School Name	Location	Grades	Enrollment	Career Programs Available
Delcastle Technical High School	unincorporated area near Newport	09–12	1,518 students	Auto Body, Auto Technology, Aviation Technology, Business Technology, Carpenty, Chemical Lab Technology, Cosmetology, Culinary Arts, Dental Assisting, Digital Media, Electrical Trades, Electronics, General Construction, Graphic Arts, Medical Assisting, Nursing Technology, Plumbing, Practical Nursing, Production and Imaging Technologies, Residential and Industrial Piping Systems, Sheet Metal Fabrication, Technical Drafting and Design, Welding/Fabrication Technologies
Hodgson Vo-Tech High School	Glasgow (An unincorporated CDP)	09–12	1,024 students	Academy of Manufacturing & Pre-Engineering, Auto Body, Auto Technology, Business Technology, Carpenty, Cosmetology, Culinary Arts, Dental Assisting, Dental Lab Technology, Early Childhood Education, Electrical Trades, Environmental Landscape Technology, Health Information Technology, Heating Ventilation & Air Conditioning, Industrial Mechanics/Millwright Technology, Masonry, Nursing Technology, Plumbing, Technical Drafting and Design
Howard High School of Technology	Wilmington	09–12	842 students	Academy of Finance & Business, Carpentry, Computer Network Administration, Cosmetology, Culinary Arts, Dental Assisting, Electrical Trades, Engine Technology, Legal Administrative Assisting, Medical Assisting, Nursing Technology, Public Service, Structural Steel Detailing
St. Georges Technical High School	Unincorporated area near Middletown	09–12	1,123 students	Athletic Training, Auto Technology, Biotechnology, Business Software Applications, Carpentry, Culinary Arts, Early Childhood Education, Electrical Trades, Emergency Medical Services, Health Information Technology, Heating Ventilation & Air Conditioning, Medical Assisting, Nursing Technology, Plumbing, Technical Drafting and Design, Web & Print Technology
