= Delaware Interscholastic Athletic Association =

High school sports association

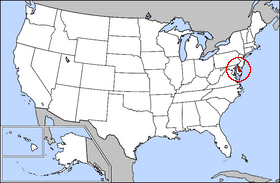
- Abbreviation: DIAA
- Formation: 2002
- Type: Volunteer
- Legal status: Association
- Purpose: Athletic/Educational
- Headquarters: 35 Commerce Way; Dover, DE 19904
- Region served: Delaware
- Members: 41 high schools
- Executive Director: David Baylor
- Affiliations: National Federation of State High School Associations
- Budget: $768,300
- Volunteers: 26
- Website: www.doe.k12.de.us/diaa
- Remarks: (302) 857-3365

The Delaware Interscholastic Athletic Association (DIAA) is an organization that oversees and regulates interscholastic athletics in the U.S. state of Delaware. The DIAA is headquartered at the John W. Collette Education Resource Center in Dover.

== History ==
Between 1947 and 1965, interscholastic athletics in Delaware was governed by the Delaware Association of Secondary Administrators (DASA), which also had other responsibilities beyond athletics. By the mid-1960s, the growth of interscholastic athletics had created the need for a separate governing body, and in 1966 the Delaware Secondary Schools Athletic Association (DSSAA) was formed.

In July 2002, the DSSAA was dissolved and the Delaware Interscholastic Athletic Association was created to fill the void. Its goals, objectives and responsibilities were the same as those of its predecessor.

== Administration and governance ==
The DIAA is led by an executive director who is an employee of the State Board of Education and appointed members of a board of directors. The executive director also sits on the board of directors but does not vote.

=== Committees ===
Standing committees make recommendations to the Board of Directors and are responsible for organizing and conducting state championships in their individual sports.

- Baseball
- Basketball (Boys’ and Girls’)
- Cross Country
- Field Hockey
- Football
- Golf
- Lacrosse (Boys’ and Girls’)
- Softball
- Soccer (Boys’ and Girls’)
- Swimming and Diving
- Tennis
- Track and Field
- Volleyball (Girls’)
- Wrestling
- Officials
- Rules and Regulations
- Sportsmanship
- Sports Medicine

== Awards and honors ==
=== Certificates ===
The DIAA provides "scholar-athlete" certificates for students who maintain a 3.5 GPA and earn a varsity letter (high school) or who maintain grades of "B" or better in all subjects and are on an interscholastic team (middle school) during the season. "Tri-athlete" certificates are also provided for high school students who earn varsity letters in three different sports during the school year.

=== Scholarships ===
The DIAA sponsors the annual Senior Scholar-Athlete Awards. Member schools select one male candidate and one female candidate who then apply for the awards. A selection committee reviews the applications and chooses a male and a female winner who receive a plaque and a $1,500 scholarship to the post-secondary institution of their choice. The selection committee also chooses a male and a female runner-up who receive a plaque and a $1,000 scholarship to the post-secondary institution of their choice.

The DIAA also sponsors the annual Sportsmanship Award, a non-competitive award for which any member school can qualify by submitting an application and satisfying ten performance criteria. The award recognizes good sportsmanship among the member schools. Past recipients include St. Andrew's School (1998), William Penn High School (1998-2009), and Newark High School (2003, 2004, and 2005). Recipients receive a banner in their school colors, a $500 grant, five state tournament passes, and guaranteed slots for two student delegates and one adult delegate to the NFHS Student Leadership Conference.

=== Other recognitions ===
The DIAA also sponsors the attendance of 16 student delegates and four adult delegates to the NFHS Student Leadership Conference in Indianapolis in July of each year.

== See also ==
- NFHS
