= George Schollenberger =

American sports coach (1904–1982)

Biographical details
- Born: September 10, 1904; Easton, Pennsylvania, U.S.
- Died: August 17, 1982 (aged 77); Salisbury, Maryland, U.S.

Playing career

Football
- 1926: St. Bonaventure
- 1927–1929: Temple

Baseball
- c. 1929: Temple
- Position: Lineman (football)

Coaching career (HC unless noted)

Football
- 1930–1965: Laurel HS (DE)

Baseball
- Laurel HS (DE)

Men's basketball
- Laurel HS (DE)

Women's basketball
- Laurel HS (DE)

Administrative career (AD unless noted)
- 1966–1973: Laurel HS (DE)

Accomplishments and honors

Awards
- Delaware Sports Museum and Hall of Fame (1979)

George Shaver Schollenberger (September 10, 1904 – August 17, 1982) was an American sports coach. He was best known for his stint at Laurel High School in Delaware and was inducted into the Delaware Sports Museum and Hall of Fame in 1979.

== Early life ==
Schollenberger was born on September 10, 1904, in Easton, Pennsylvania. He attended Olean High School in Olean, New York. He played one season of college football for the St. Bonaventure Brown and White of St. Bonaventure University, before transferring to Temple University where he played three years as a lineman for the Temple Owls. The team's starting center as a senior, Schollenberger was named Temple's most valuable lineman. He also played baseball at the school and was prominent in social affairs, being a member of the Blue Key Honor Society and an officer for the Theta Upsilon Omega fraternity. He graduated from Temple following the 1929 season.

== Coaching career ==
Schollenberger moved to Delaware in 1930 and became a coach and teacher at Laurel High School in Laurel. He went on to serve as a coach at the school for 36 seasons – from 1930 to 1965 – and served as head coach in four different sports (football, men's basketball, women's basketball, baseball), and another (track and field) on an "informal basis". He was best known as football coach and became known as a "coaching legend" – he was a well-known figure in the area and was considered one of the top coaches in the Atlantic Coast region. He was often offered better coaching positions at other schools but declined them due to wanting to stay at Laurel; The Daily Times noted that he was so well-known that teams in the National Football League sometimes asked of his opinions.

In Schollenberger's time as men's basketball coach, he won over 80 percent of his games, including a five-year span where they lost just three games; as women's coach, he led the team to a state championship. As the coach of the football team, Schollenberger became one of the winningest coaches in state history, compiling an overall record of 140–109–21, which included five undefeated seasons. He was named the Delaware Coach of the Year in 1957, after having led Laurel to an undefeated 7–0 record while outscoring opposition 222–12. Among players he coached, best known were Carlton Elliott and Ron Waller, both of whom played in the NFL. He retired from coaching in 1966 to become Laurel's athletic director, a position he held until 1973.

== Personal life, death and legacy ==
Schollenberger was married and had two children. He was a freemason and was a president of the Laurel Lions Club and Delaware Retired Teachers Association. He was also a member of the Chorus of the Nanticoke and St. Philip's Episcopal Church in Laurel. He died on August 17, 1982, in Salisbury, Maryland, of a heart ailment, at the age of 77.

Schollenberger was inducted in to the Delaware Sports Museum and Hall of Fame in 1979. Sports Illustrated placed him 28th on their 1999 list of the "50 Greatest Sports Figures From Delaware"; The News Journal ranked him 118th on their 2023 list of the "125 Greatest Coaches in Delaware History". Schollenberger's son wrote a biography of him, and an athletic training facility in Laurel was built and named in his honor in 1985.
