= Rider Potato House =

- U.S. National Register of Historic Places
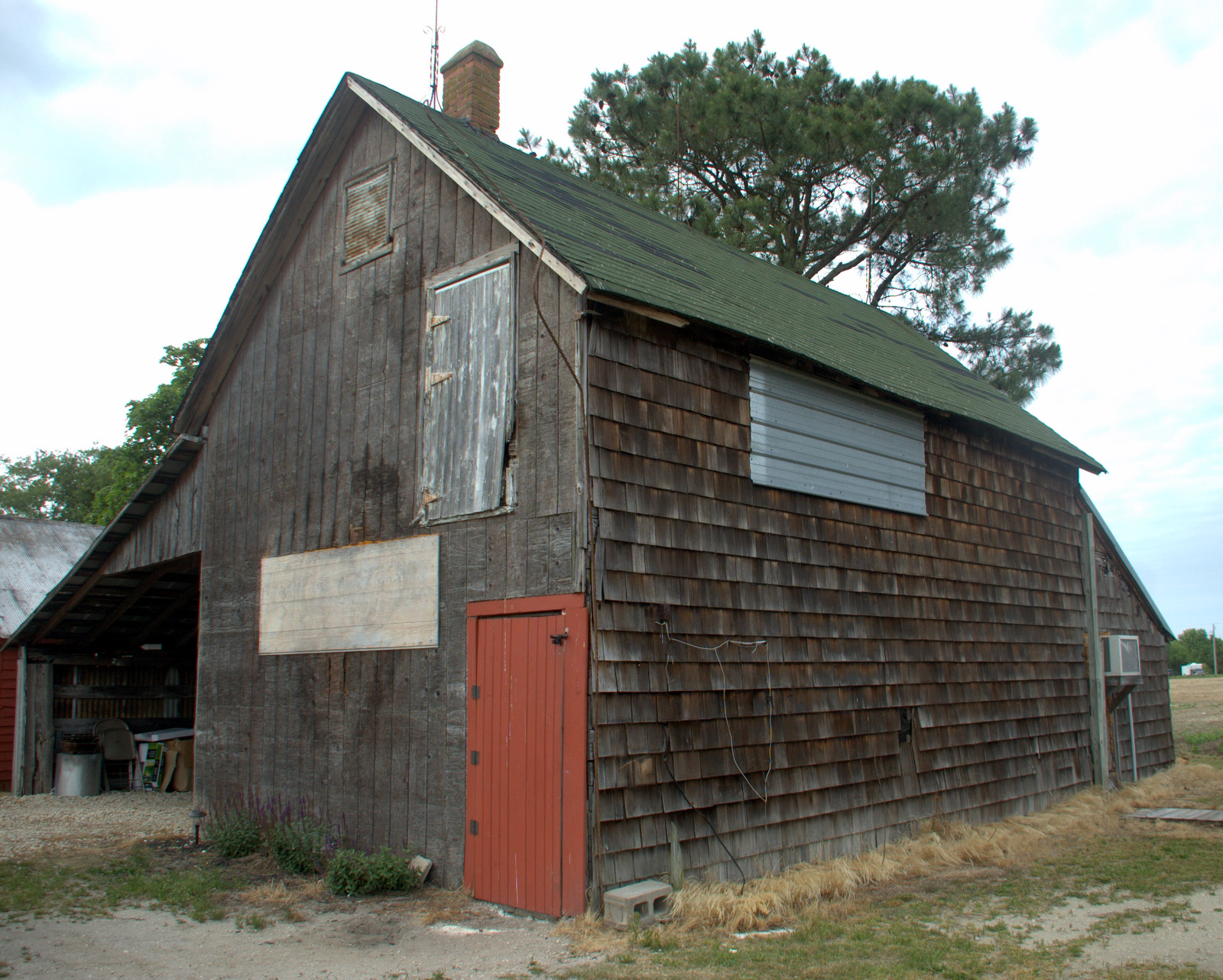

- Location within Delaware Location within the United States
- Location: Southeast of junction of Roads 505 and 506, near Laurel, Delaware
- Coordinates: 38°33′37″N 75°32′14″W
- Area: 0.1 acres (0.040 ha)
- Built: c. 1920
- MPS: Sweet Potato Houses of Sussex County MPS
- NRHP reference No.: 90001699
- Added to NRHP: November 15, 1990

Rider Potato House is a historic potato house located near Laurel, Sussex County, Delaware. It one of the last surviving examples of its building type. It was built about 1920, and is a 1 1/2-story, gable fronted, balloon frame structure on a brick foundation. It measures 18 feet, 5 inches, by 24 feet 5 inches. It retains a number of important elements characteristic of potato house including: shingled exterior, the quality of second floor paneled interior, ventilation features, and original sliding doors.

It was placed on the National Register of Historic Places in 1990.
