= Ralph Potato House =

- U.S. National Register of Historic Places
- Location within Delaware Location within the United States
- Location: Southeast of junction of Roads 493 and 494, near Laurel, Delaware
- Coordinates: 38°32′15″N 75°38′19″W
- Area: 0.1 acres (0.040 ha)
- Built: c. 1915
- MPS: Sweet Potato Houses of Sussex County MPS
- NRHP reference No.: 90001698
- Added to NRHP: November 15, 1990

Ralph Potato House is a historic potato house located near Laurel, Sussex County, Delaware. It one of the last surviving examples of its building type. It was built about 1915, and is a 1 1/2-story, gable fronted, balloon frame structure on a brick foundation. It retains a number of important elements characteristic of potato house including: double sheathing, an interior brick chimney, shuttered openings, and gaps between walls and floorboards.

It was placed on the National Register of Historic Places in 1990.
