= Collins Potato House =

- U.S. National Register of Historic Places
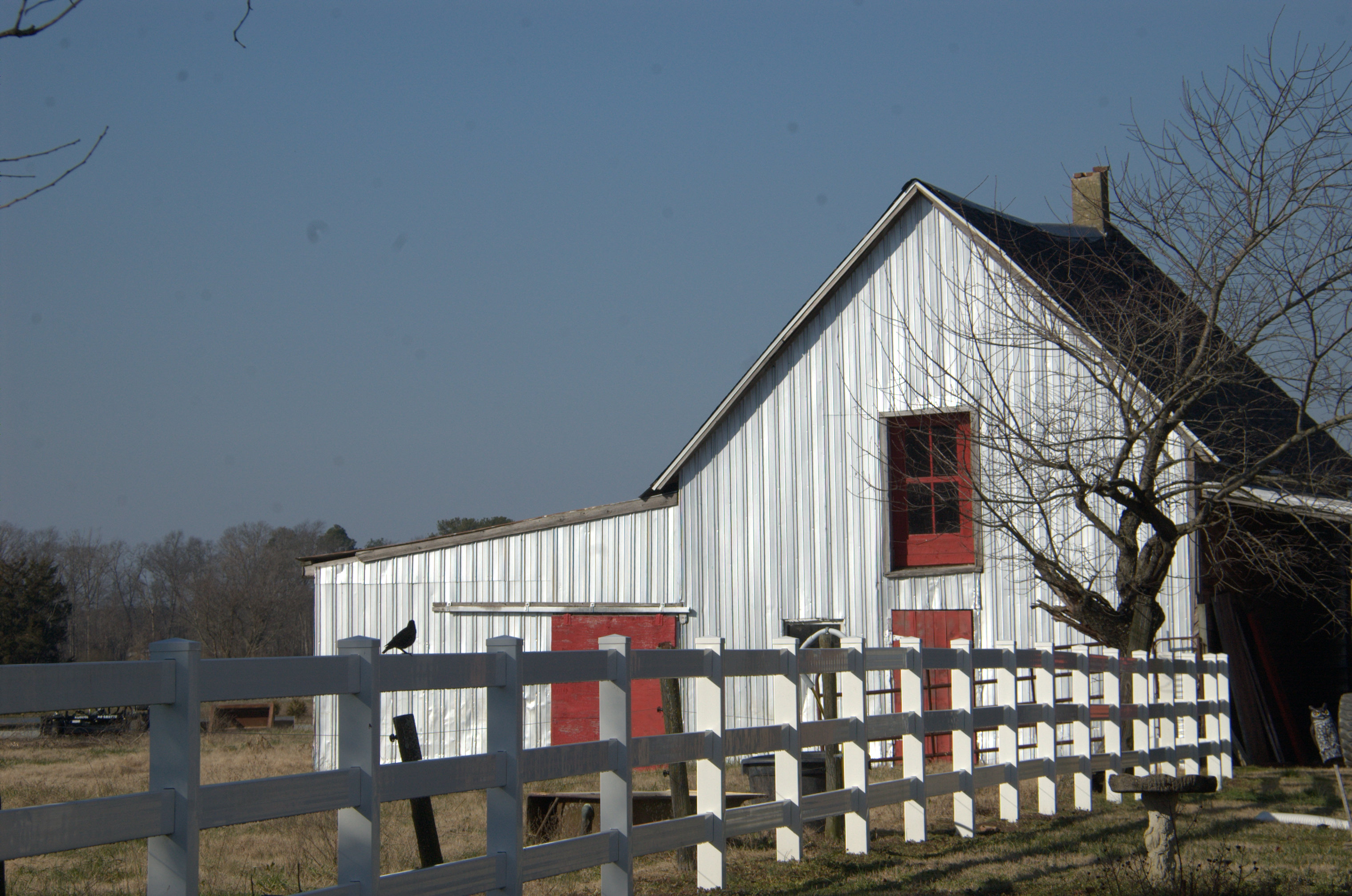

- Location within Delaware Location within the United States
- Location: Junction of Roads 509 and 510A, near Laurel, Delaware
- Coordinates: 38°31′35″N 75°36′18″W
- Area: 0.1 acres (0.040 ha)
- MPS: Sweet Potato Houses of Sussex County MPS
- NRHP reference No.: 90001692
- Added to NRHP: November 15, 1990

The Collins Potato House is located near Laurel, Delaware, one of the last surviving examples of its building type. The southern part of Delaware saw a sweet potato boom from 1900 until blight struck in the 1940s. In order to store the crops, potato houses were built. The Collins house was the first to be built in the Little Creek Hundred region and dates to the late 19th century. Measuring 19 feet (5.8 m) by 30 feet (9.1 m), the two-story balloon-frame structure consists of a central aisle flanked by bins on both levels. There are five bins per side. An interior stair provides access to the first floor. Freeze protection was provided by a coal stove. Wall construction is in three layers, with interior planking, sheathing and weatherboard siding. The front elevation on the west side features door at the first and second floors, while the rear elevation has a door at the first floor and a window at the second. Small windows are in both gables for ventilation.

The Collins Potato House was placed on the National Register of Historic Places on November 15, 1990.
