= Phillips Potato House =

- U.S. National Register of Historic Places
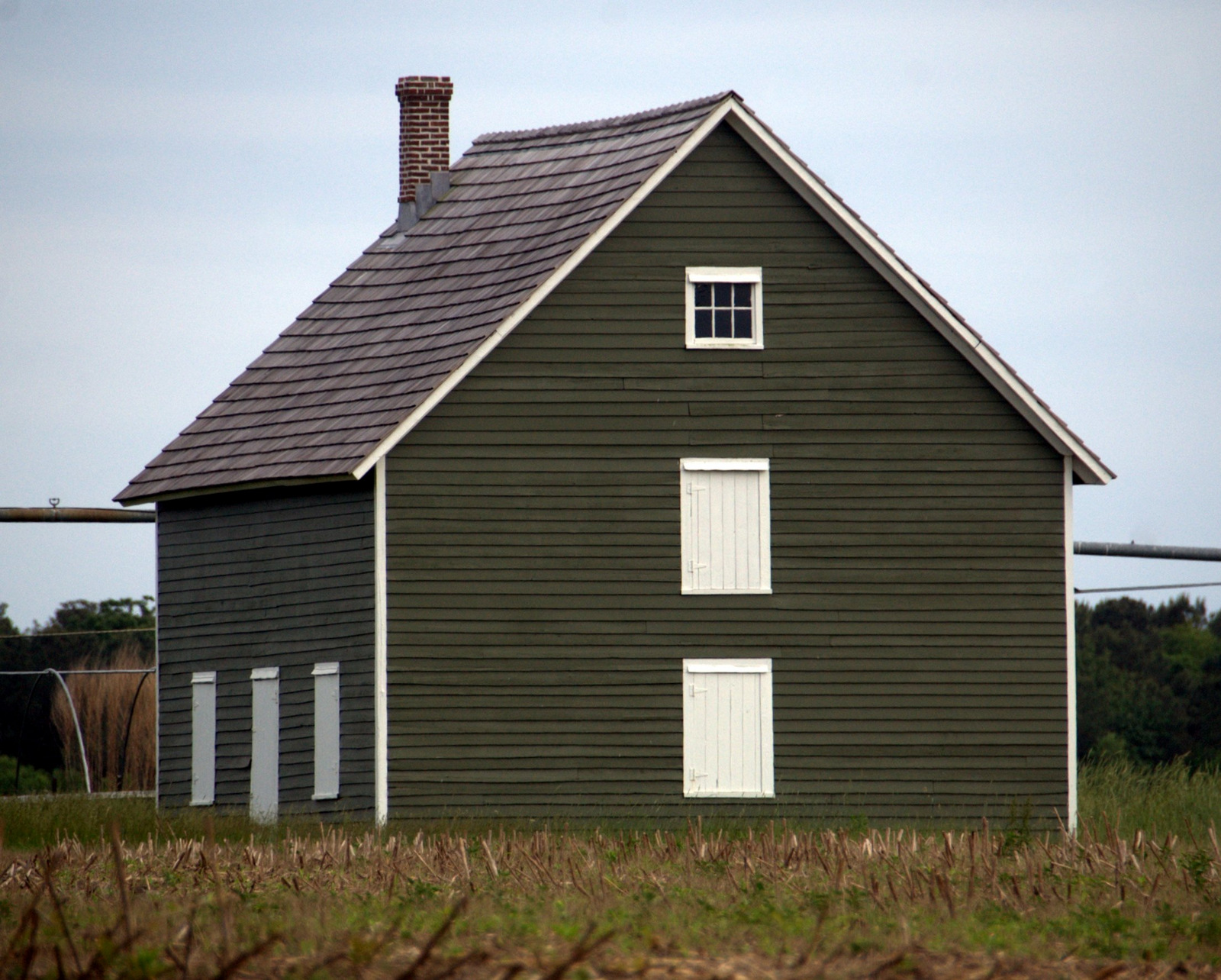

- Location within Delaware Location within the United States
- Location: Southwest of junction of Roads 492 and 492A, near Laurel, Delaware
- Coordinates: 38°33′20″N 75°36′59″W
- Area: 0.1 acres (0.040 ha)
- Built: c. 1900
- MPS: Sweet Potato Houses of Sussex County MPS
- NRHP reference No.: 90001697
- Added to NRHP: November 15, 1990

Phillips Potato House is a historic potato house located near Laurel, Sussex County, Delaware. It one of the last surviving examples of its building type. It was built about 1900, and is a two-story, balloon frame structure on a concrete foundation and with a gable roof. It measures 24 feet by 29 feet, and at the time of designation to the National Register of Historic Places was sheathed in green asbestos shingles over original weatherboards.

The Philips potato house was restored around 2015.

It was placed on the National Register of Historic Places in 1990.
