= Chipman Potato House =

- U.S. National Register of Historic Places
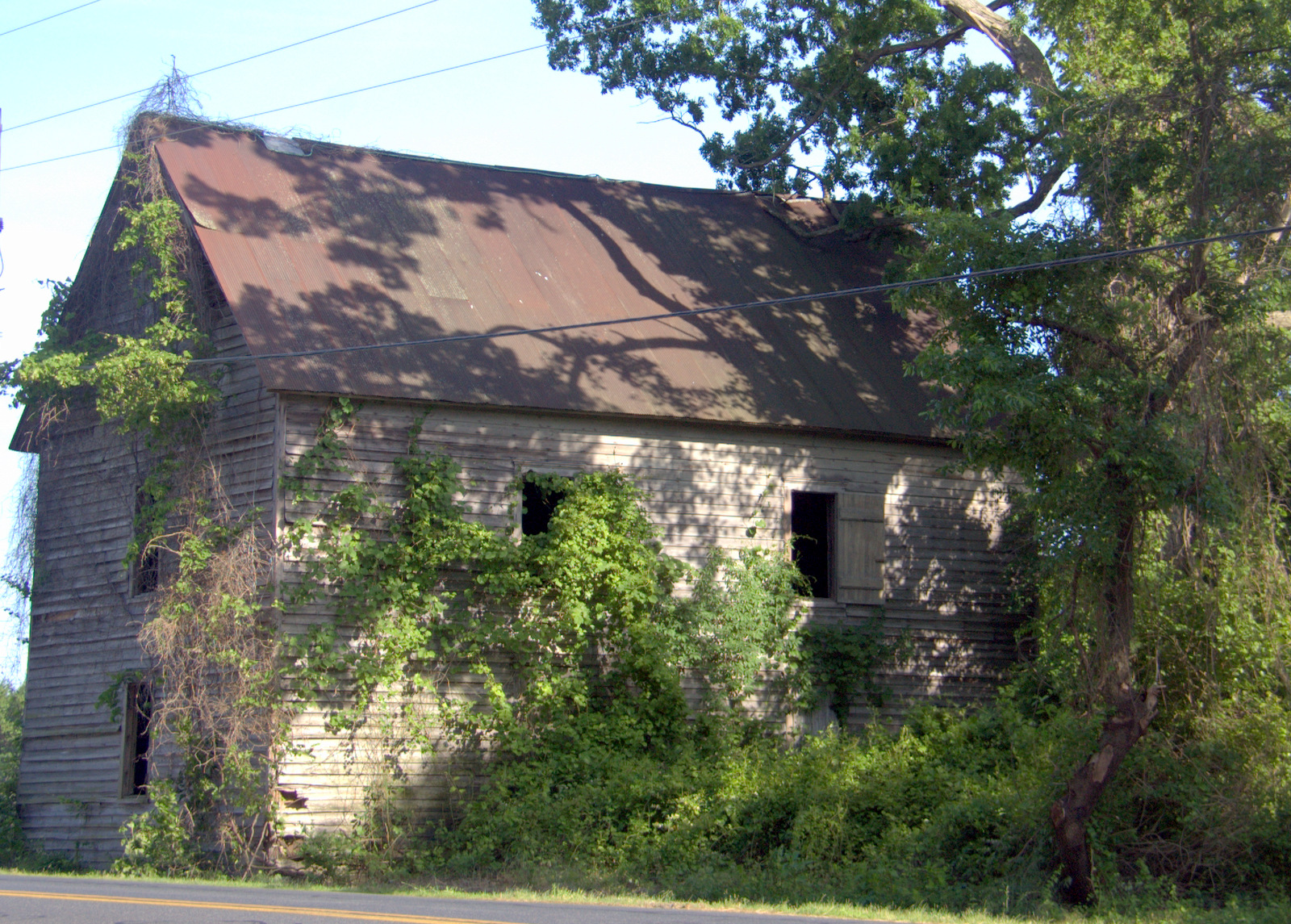

- Location within Delaware Location within the United States
- Location: Junction of Roads 465 and 465A, Laurel, Delaware
- Coordinates: 38°33′37″N 75°32′14″W
- Area: 0.5 acres (0.20 ha)
- Built by: Ernest & Joseph Chipman
- Architectural style: Potato house
- MPS: Sweet Potato Houses of Sussex County MPS
- NRHP reference No.: 90001691
- Added to NRHP: November 15, 1990

The Chipman Potato House was located near Laurel, Delaware, one of the last surviving examples of its building type. The southern part of Delaware saw a sweet potato boom from 1900 until blight struck in the 1940s. In order to store the crops, potato houses were built. The Chipman House was built in 1913 by Joseph and Ernest Chipman on their property with the assistance of Alva Hudson. The 2½ story balloon-framed house was furnished with sparse, shuttered windows and slatted floors, allowing adjustment of air circulation. Two stoves provided heat during the winter, one of which survives.

The Chipman potato house was modified for tractor access. Windows were once glazed beneath the shutters, a very unusual feature in a potato house. The internal structure used samson posts, a kind of capped column that is normally employed in mill construction to bear heavy loads, leading to speculation that the feature echos construction in the adjacent, now destroyed Chipman's Mill. The Chipman house was also unusual in plan, divided into four quadrants with 2.5-foot (0.76 m) walkways between. Each quadrant was divided into at least three bins. The attic was divided in two with a center aisle, for a total of 50 bins, typically 9 feet (2.7 m) by 3 feet (0.91 m).

The Chipman Potato House was placed on the National Register of Historic Places in 1990. The structure was removed from the site in late 2017 or early 2018.

== See also ==
- Chipman's Mill, also built by the Chipman family nearby
