= North Laurel, Delaware =

Coordinates: 38.5658°N 75.5694°W

North Laurel is a former town in Sussex County, Delaware. It was merged with the town of Laurel on April 13, 1929.

== History ==
The bill to incorporate the town of North Laurel was brought before the Delaware House of Representatives by Representative Samuel J. Kenney on January 29, 1915. The bill described the boundaries as such:

Beginning at the East Side of a proposed Poplar Street and the North side of Laurel River; thence following up the North side of said river to and across Records Mill Dam; thence up the North side of Records Mill Pond to a branch on the North side of said Mill Pond; thence up with the said branch in a Northerly direction to a new public road leading to Georgetown; thence in a Westerly direction along and with the South side of said public road to the public road leading from Laurel to Bethel; thence along and with the South-East side of Poplar Street to the place of beginning.

The bill was passed by the Delaware House of Representatives on February 26, 1915, and also established the first town commissioners, William L. Torbert, William L. James, and Robert Waller, until an election could be held. The bill then moved to the Delaware Senate and passed unanimously on March 5, 1915. Having passed the 98th Delaware General Assembly, the bill moved on to Governor Charles R. Miller.

On April 15, 1915, the town commissioners met and elected the towns first officers: President William L. Torbert, Town Clerk Edgar L. Hudson, Assessor Daniel Short, Collector Harvey B. King, and Treasurer Edward H. Twilley.

The town's 1920 census showed 182 residents and the town included businesses such as a cider shop, grocery store, and the Laurel Lumber Company.

Historical population
Census	Pop.	Note	%±
1920	182		—
1930	265		45.6%
U.S. Decennial Census

In early 1927, two bills began circulating in the Delaware General Assembly to merge the towns of North Laurel and Laurel. The first bill was written to cancel the town of North Laurel's charter and the second bill would concurrently annex the land formerly in North Laurel into the Laurel town limits. The 1927 attempt to merge the two towns failed when the residents of North Laurel voted against the proposal in April, prompting the entire town council to refuse to serve another term.

Two years later, in March 1929, the Delaware General Assembly again passed bills allowing for North Laurel to cancel their charter and for Laurel to annex the former town if the residents of both towns voted in favor of the proposal. On March 29, the two towns voted to merge, with the ballots being 39 to 18 in favor of merging in North Laurel and 78 to 11 in favor of merging in Laurel. The properties in the former town of North Laurel were turned into the fourth ward of Laurel and an election was held on April 26 to give representation to the area on the Laurel town council, bringing an end to the merger.
