= Stanley Potato House =

- U.S. National Register of Historic Places
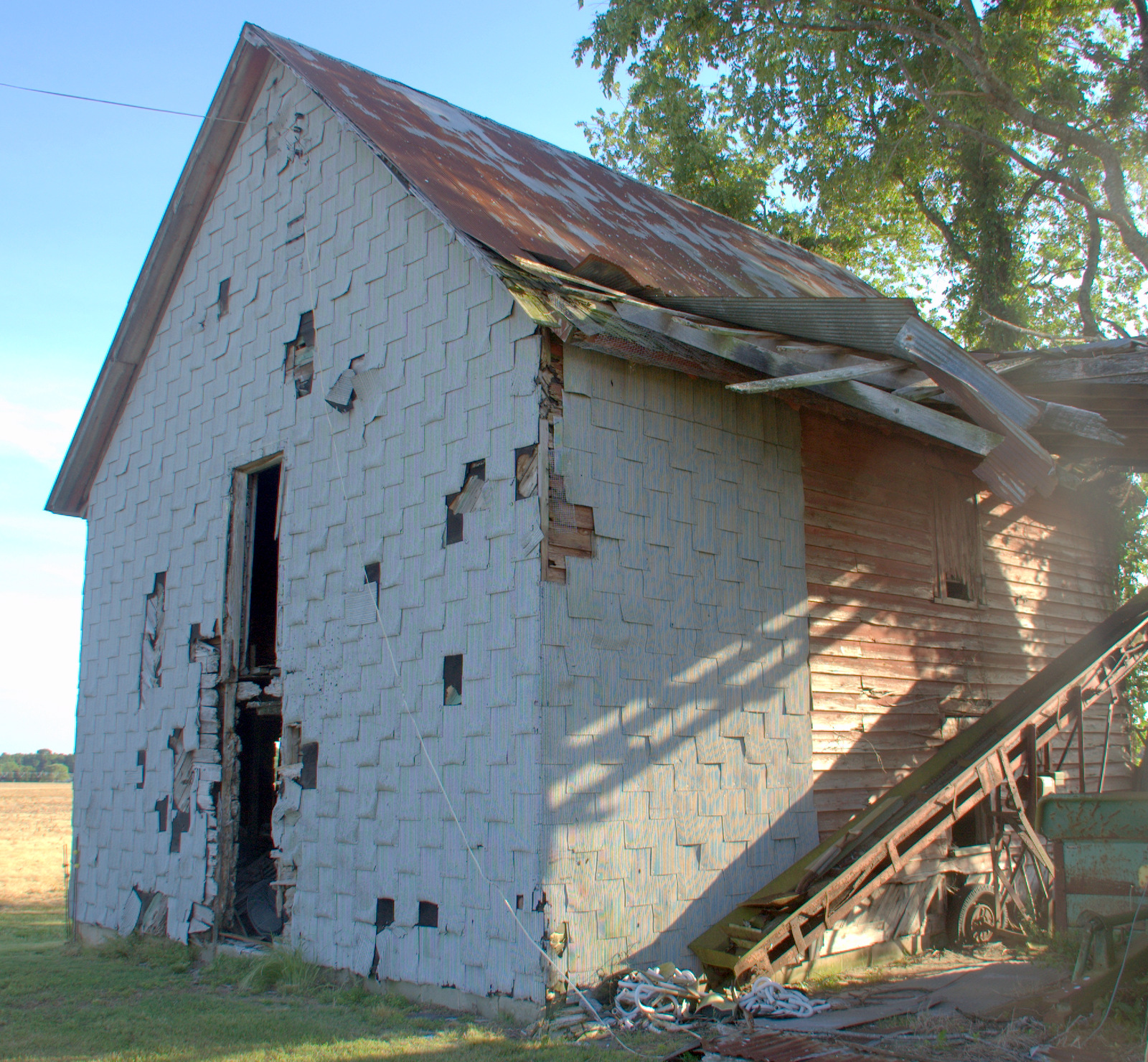

- Location within Delaware Location within the United States
- Location: North of junction of Roads 68 and 451, near Laurel, Delaware
- Coordinates: 38°31′4″N 75°32′35″W
- Area: 0.1 acres (0.040 ha)
- Built: c. 1920
- MPS: Sweet Potato Houses of Sussex County MPS
- NRHP reference No.: 90001700
- Added to NRHP: November 15, 1990

Stanley Potato House is a historic potato house located near Laurel, Sussex County, Delaware, United States. It is one of the last surviving examples of its building type. It was built about 1920, and is a 1 1/2-story, gable fronted, balloon frame structure on a brick foundation. It measures 17 feet by 23 feet. It retains a number of important elements characteristic of potato house including: minimal fenestration, center aisle floor plan, double siding, and hatched loading doors.

It was placed on the National Register of Historic Places in 1990.
