= Hearn Potato House =

- U.S. National Register of Historic Places
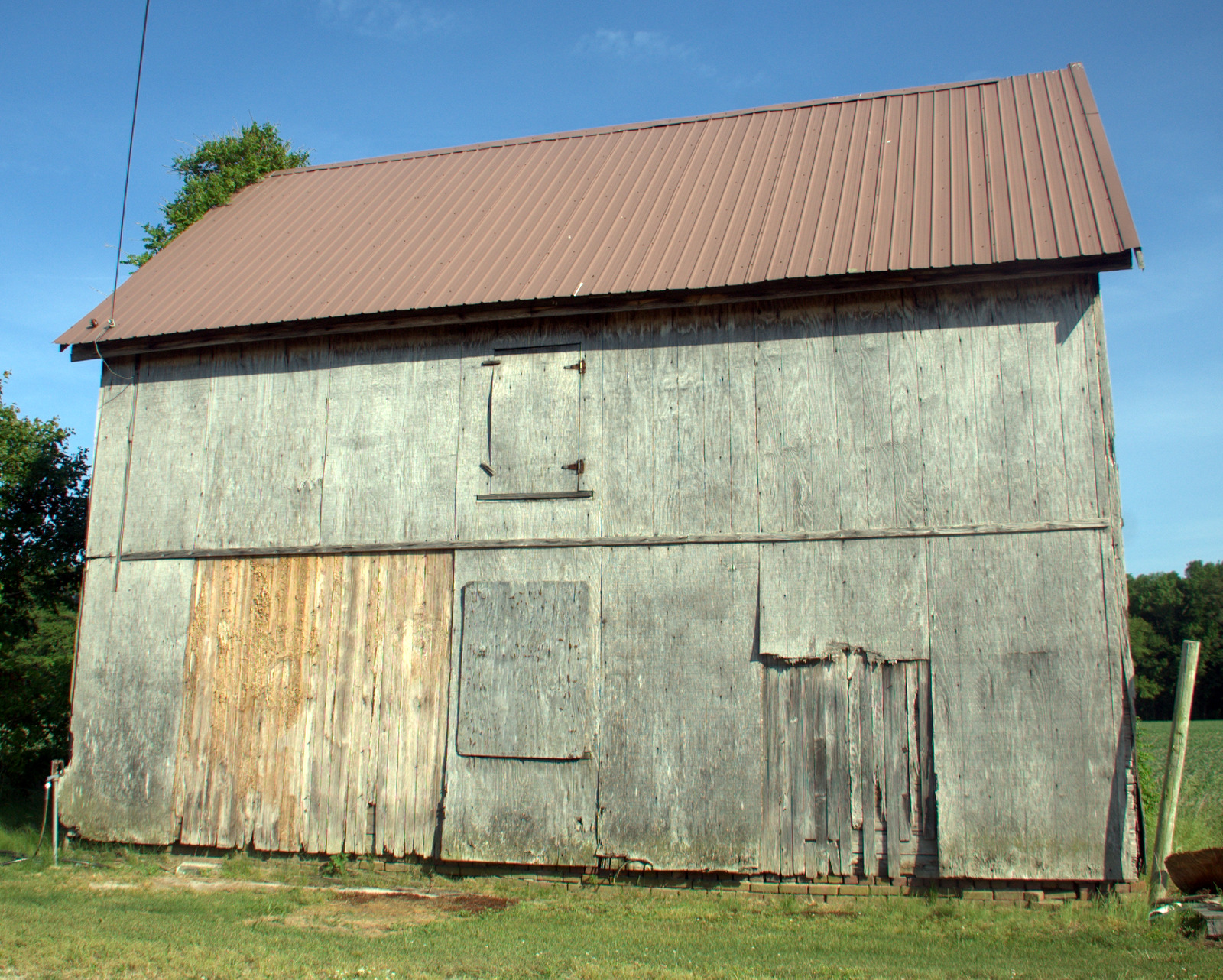

- Location within Delaware Location within the United States
- Location: 0.6 miles north of junction of Roads 62 and 74, near Laurel, Delaware
- Coordinates: 38°35′8″N 75°27′35″W
- Area: 0.1 acres (0.040 ha)
- Built: c. 1900
- MPS: Sweet Potato Houses of Sussex County MPS
- NRHP reference No.: 90001694
- Added to NRHP: November 15, 1990

Hearn Potato House is a historic potato house located near Laurel, Sussex County, Delaware. It one of the last surviving examples of its building type. It was built about 1900, and is a 1 1/2-story, gable fronted, balloon frame structure resting on a brick foundation. It measures 18 ft 3 in (5.56 m) by 28 ft 3 in (8.61 m). It retains a number of important elements characteristic of potato house including: tall, narrow proportions, triple sheathing, hatched windows, interior chimney, storage bins, ventilation features, and gable front orientation.

It was placed on the National Register of Historic Places in 1990.
