= E. L. Hitch Potato House =

- U.S. National Register of Historic Places
- Location within Delaware Location within the United States
- Location: Junction of Roads 480 and 489, near Laurel, Delaware
- Coordinates: 38°36′11″N 75°33′48″W
- Area: 0.1 acres (0.040 ha)
- Built: c. 1920
- MPS: Sweet Potato Houses of Sussex County MPS
- NRHP reference No.: 90001695
- Added to NRHP: November 15, 1990

E. L. Hitch Potato House is a historic potato house located near Laurel, Sussex County, Delaware. It one of the last surviving examples of its building type. It was built about 1920, and is a 1 1/2-story, gable fronted, balloon frame structure. It retains a number of important elements characteristic of potato house including: minimal fenestration, triple siding, interior and exterior doors, tightly shuttered windows, interior chimney, and storage bins.

It was placed on the National Register of Historic Places in 1990.
