= Moore Potato House =

- U.S. National Register of Historic Places
- Location within Delaware Location within the United States
- Location: Southeast of junction of Roads 72 and 463, near Laurel, Delaware
- Coordinates: 38°31′15″N 75°30′1″W
- Area: 0.1 acres (0.040 ha)
- Built: c. 1920
- MPS: Sweet Potato Houses of Sussex County MPS
- NRHP reference No.: 90001696
- Added to NRHP: November 15, 1990

Moore Potato House is a historic potato house located near Laurel, Sussex County, Delaware. It one of the last surviving examples of its building type. It was built about 1920, and is a 1 1/2-story, gable fronted, balloon frame structure. It measures 16 feet 6 inches (5.03 meters), by 20 feet 4 inches (6.20 meters). It retains a number of important elements characteristic of potato house including: tall and narrow proportions, triple siding, minimal fenestration, tightly fitting window hatches, and interior ventilation features (especially the slated floor).

It was placed on the National Register of Historic Places in 1990.
