= List of Blue Key Honor Society chapters =

Blue Key Honor Society is an American national honor society for college upperclassmen. Following is an incomplete list of its chapters.

Number	Charter date	Institution	Location	Status	Ref.
	November 27, 1924	University of Florida	Gainesville, Florida	Withdrew (local)	(Note: The University of Florida chapter separated from the national Blue Key organization during the 1930s and has been known since as Florida Blue Key, a local organization. However, Florida Blue Key still owns the trademark for the national Blue Key organization and uses the same badge.)
25B	May 27, 1925	Emory and Henry College	Emory, Virginia	Active	
	1925	Walbash College	Crawfordsville, Indiana	Inactive	
	1925	Pennsylvania State University	University Park, Pennsylvania	Inactive	
	1925	University of Pennsylvania	Philadelphia, Pennsylvania	Inactive	
	1925	University of Utah	Salt Lake City, Utah	Inactive	
	December 1925	Wittenburg College	Springfield, Ohio	Inactive	
26A	1926–after October 2004	Trinity University	San Antonio, Texas	Inactive	
26B	February 26, 1926	University of Georgia	Athens, Georgia	Active	
26C	March 9, 1926	Colorado School of Mines	Golden, Colorado	Active	(Note: Chapter formed from the Vigilantees, a local student group established in 1926.)
	1926	Auburn University	Auburn, Alabama	Inactive	
	1926	Northest Missouri State University	Maryville, Missouri	Inactive	
26F	April 7, 1926	Truman State University	Kirksville, Missouri	Active	
26G	April 24, 1926	University of Nevada, Reno	Reno, Nevada	Active	
	May 1926	Pacific University	Forest Grove, Oregon	Inactive	
	1926–xxxx ?;September 22, 2018	Bulter University	Indianapolis, Indiana	Active	
	1926	University of Tennessee at Chattanooga	Chattanooga, Tennessee	Inactive	
	1926	University of North Dakota	Grand Forks, North Dakota	Inactive	
	1926	University of Idaho	Moscow, Idaho	Inactive	
	1926	Oglethorpe University	Brookhaven, Georgia	Inactive	
	1926	Pacific University	Forest Grove, Oregon	Inactive	
	1926–after October 2004	Loyola University of Chicago	Chicago, Illinois	Inactive	(Note: Chapter formed from the Loyola Booster Club which had gone inactive. It went code in 1977.)
	1927	Sewanee: The University of the South	Sewanee, Tennessee	Inactive	
	1927	Michigan State University	East Lansing, Michigan	Inactive	
	1927	Ohio University	Athens, Ohio	Inactive	
27G	May 3, 1927	North Dakota State University	Fargo, North Dakota	Active	
27H	May 25, 1927	Nebraska Wesleyan University	Lincoln, Nebraska	Active	
	1927	Drexel Tech	Philadelphia, Pennsylvania	Inactive	
27J	May 28, 1927	Midland University	Fremont, Nebraska	Active	
	1927	Franklin University	Columbus, Ohio	Inactive	
	1927–after October 2004	Iowa Wesleyan University	Mount Pleasant, Iowa	Inactive	
	1927	DePaul University	Chicago, Illinois	Inactive	
	1927	University of South Carolina	Columbia, South Carolina	Inactive	
	1928	Wittenberg University	Springfield, Ohio	Inactive	
	1928–after October 2004	Mississippi State University	Starkville, Mississippi	Inactive	
	1928	South Dakota State University	Brookings, South Dakota	Inactive	
	1928	University of Arkansas	Fayetteville, Arkansas	Inactive	
	1928	Mercer University	Macon, Georgia	Inactive	
	1928	North Carolina State University	Raleigh, North Carolina	Inactive	
	1928–after October 2004	Wofford College	Spartanburg, South Carolina	Inactive	
	1929–after October 2004	Indiana University		Inactive	
	1930	Roanoke College	Salem, Virginia	Inactive	
	1930	University of Southern California	Los Angeles, California	Inactive	
	1931	Loyola University New Orleans	New Orleans, Louisiana	Inactive	
32B	March 21, 1932	Clemson University	Clemson, South Carolina	Active	
	1932	Presbyterian College	Clinton, South Carolina	Inactive	
32D	May 19, 1932	University of Louisiana at Lafayette	Lafayette, Louisiana	Active	(Note: Was called Southwestern Louisiana when chapter was formed.)
	1932	Michigan Technological University	Houghton, Michigan	Active	
	1932	Southern Methodist University	Dallas, Texas	Inactive	
	1932	Hope College	Holland, Michigan	Inactive	
	1932	Cumberland College	Princeton, Kentucky	Inactive	
	1932–after October 2004	Utah State University	Logan, Utah	Inactive	
	1932	St. Olaf College	Northfield, Minnesota	Active	
	1932–2002	Oklahoma State University–Stillwater	Stillwater, Oklahoma	Inactive	
	1932	Rose–Hulman Institute of Technology	Terre Haute, Indiana	Active	
	1932	Case Institute of Technology	Cleveland, Ohio	Inactive	
	1932	Chadron State College	Chadron, Nebraska	Active	
	1932	Southeastern Oklahoma State University	Durant, Oklahoma	Active	
	1932	Concord University	Athens, West Virginia	Active	
	1932	Catholic University of America	Washington, D.C.	Inactive	
	1932–2009	Brigham Young University	Provo, Utah	Inactive	
	1932–after October 2004	Ball State University	Muncie, Indiana	Inactive	
	1932	Western New Mexico University	Silver City, New Mexico	Inactive	
	1932	Kent State University	Kent, Ohio	Inactive	
	1932	San Diego State University	San Diego, California	Inactive	
	1933–after March 2016	Oklahoma City University	Oklahoma City, Oklahoma	Inactive	
	March 22, 1933	Missouri University of Science and Technology	Rolla, Missouri	Active	
	1933	Colorado State College	Greeley, Colorado	Inactive	
	1933–after October 2004	University of Arizona	Tucson, Arizona	Inactive	
	1934	Kansas State University	Manhattan, Kansas	Active	
	1934–c. 2008	Oregon State University	Corvallis, Oregon	Inactive	
	1936	California State University, Fresno	Fresno, California	Inactive	
	1936	Alfred University	Alfred, New York	Inactive	
	1936	California State University, Chico	Chico, California	Inactive	
	1939	Indiana State University	Terre Haute, Indiana	Active	
	1940	University of California, Santa Barbara	Santa Barbara, California	Inactive	
	1941	Hendrix College	Conway, Arkansas	Inactive	
	1941	Arizona State University	Tempe, Arizona	Inactive	
	1942	Detroit		Inactive	
	1942	Philips University	Enid, Oklahoma	Inactive	
	1943	Illinois Wesleyan University	Bloomington, Illinois	Inactive	
	1948–after October 2004	Augustana University	Sioux Falls, South Dakota	Inactive	
	1948	Furman University	Greenville, South Carolina	Inactive	
	1948	Southwestern University	Georgetown, Texas	Inactive	
	1948	San Jose State University	San Jose, California	Inactive	
	1949	Northern Arizona University	Flagstaff, Arizona	Active	
	1949	Lewis & Clark College	Portland, Oregon	Inactive	
	1950	University of the Pacific	Stockton, California	Inactive	
	1950	Eastern Washington University	Cheney, Washington	Inactive	
	1950	California State University, Los Angeles	Los Angeles, California	Inactive	
	1950	University of North Texas	Denton, Texas	Inactive	
	1951–after October 2004	Babson College	Wellesley, Massachusetts	Inactive	
	1951	Newberry College	Newberry, South Carolina	Active	
	1951	Pacific Lutheran University	Parkland, Washington	Inactive	
	1951	University of Portland	Portland, Oregon	Active	
	1951	University of California, Davis	Davis, California	Inactive	
	1951	Georgia State University	Atlanta, Georgia	Inactive	
	1951	University of West Alabama	Livingston, Alabama	Active	
	1952	University of Toledo	Toledo, Ohio	Active	(Note: Chapter formed from an organization known by the Greek letters ARX.)
	1952	California Institute of Technology	Pasadena, California	Inactive	
	1954–after March 2013	Colorado College	Colorado Springs, Colorado	Inactive	
	1954	Arkansas Tech University	Russellville, Arkansas	Inactive	
	1956–after October 2004	Carson–Newman University	Jefferson City, Tennessee	Inactive	
	1956	Mommouth University	West Long Branch, New Jersey	Inactive	
	1956–after October 2004	McNeese State University	Lake Charles, Louisiana	Inactive	
	1956	New Mexico State University	Las Cruces, New Mexico	Inactive	
	1956	California State University, Sacramento	Sacramento, California	Inactive	
	1957–after October 2004	University of New Mexico	Albuquerque, New Mexico	Inactive	
	1958	Gannon University	Erie, Pennsylvania	Inactive	
	1958	Abilene Christian University	Abilene, Texas	Inactive	
	1958	California State University, Northridge	Los Angeles, California	Inactive	
	1959	Idaho State University	Pocatello, Idaho	Inactive	
	1959	Northwestern State University	Natchitoches, Louisiana	Active	
	1960	California State University, Long Beach	Long Beach, California	Inactive	
	1960	Adams State University	Alamosa, Colorado	Inactive	
	1960–after October 2004	Mount Union College	Alliance, Ohio	Inactive	
	1960	Lynchburg College	Lynchburg, Virginia	Inactive	
	1960	Northern State University	Aberdeen, South Dakota	Inactive	
	1960	Northwest Missouri State University	Maryville, Missouri	Active	
	1961	Ouachita Baptist University	Arkadelphia, Arkansas	Active	
	1961	University of Colorado Boulder	Boulder, Colorado	Inactive	
	1961	Emporia State University	Emporia, Kansas	Active	
	1961–after October 2004	Lamar University	Beaumont, Texas	Inactive	
	1961	Northern Michigan University	Marquette, Michigan	Inactive	
	1961	East Georgia State College Statesboro	Statesboro, Georgia	Inactive	
	1961	Erskin College	Due West, South Carolina	Inactive	
	1962	Morningside University	Sioux City, Iowa	Inactive	
	1962	West Virginia University	Morgantown, West Virginia	Inactive	
	1963	New York University	New York City, New York	Inactive	
	1963	California Western School of Law	San Diego, California	Inactive	
	1963	Howard Payne University	Brownwood, Texas	Inactive	
	1964	Eastern Oregon University	La Grande, Oregon	Inactive	
	1964–before 2024	University of Evansville	Evansville, Indiana	Inactive	
	1964	Weber State University	Ogden, Utah	Inactive	
	1964	Western Illinois University	Macomb, Illinois	Active	
	1964	Belmont University	Nashville, Tennessee	Inactive	
	1965	City College of New York	New York City, New York	Inactive	
	1965	Northwestern Oklahoma State University	Alva, Oklahoma	Inactive	
	1966–before 2024	Florida Institute of Technology	Melbourne, Florida	Inactive	
	1966	Morehead State University	Morehead, Kentucky	Inactive	
	1966	Western Oregon State College	Monmouth, Oregon	Inactive	
	1966–before 2024	Wayne State College	Wayne, Nebraska	Inactive	
	1967	California State University, Fullerton	Fullerton, California	Inactive	
	1967	Livingston University	Livingston, Alabama	Inactive	
	1967	University of Wisconsin–La Crosse	La Crosse, Wisconsin	Inactive	
	1968	California Polytechnic State University, San Luis Obispo	San Luis Obispo, California	Inactive	
	1968	Carthage College	Kenosha, Wisconsin	Inactive	
	1969	Cleveland		Inactive	
	1969–before 2024	Eastern New Mexico University	Portales, New Mexico	Inactive	
	1970	Florida Atlantic University	Boca Raton, Florida	Inactive	
	1970–before 2024	Georgia Southwestern State University	Americus, Georgia	Inactive	
	1970	Illinois Benedictine College	Lisle, Illinois	Inactive	
	1970	Lander University	Greenwood, South Carolina	Active	
	1971	Illinois Wesleyan University	Bloomington, Illinois	Inactive	
	1972	Our Lady of Holy Cross College	New Orleans, Louisiana	Inactive	
	1973	Philadelphia University	Philadelphia, Pennsylvania	Inactive	
	1974	St. Joseph's University	Brooklyn, New York City, New York	Inactive	
	1976	Southwestern University	Georgetown, Texas	Inactive	
	1976	University of Louisiana at Lafayette	Lafayette, Louisiana	Inactive	
	1976	Trenton		Inactive	
	1976	University of West Georgia	Carrollton, Georgia	Inactive	
	May 1976–before 2024	The College of New Jersey	Ewing Township, New Jersey	Inactive	
	2001	Slippery Rock University	Slippery Rock, Pennsylvania	Active	
	Before October 2004–before 2024	Appalachian State University	Boone, North Carolina	Inactive	
	Before October 2004–before 2024	Baker University	Baldwin City, Kansas	Inactive	
	Before October 2004–before 2024	California State University, Northridge	Los Angeles, California	Inactive	
	Before October 2004	Johns Hopkins University	Baltimore, Maryland	Active	
	Before October 2004–before 2024	Kennesaw State University	Cobb County, Georgia	Inactive	
	Before October 2004	Monmouth College	Monmouth, Illinois	Active	
	Before October 2004–before 2024	Universidad de las Américas Puebla	San Andrés Cholula, Puebla, Mexico	Inactive	
	Before October 2004	University of Alabama	Tuscaloosa, Alabama	Active	
	Before October 2004–before 2024	University of California, Los Angeles	Los Angeles, California	Inactive	
	Before October 2004–before 2024	University of Southern California	Los Angeles, California	Inactive	
	Before October 2004–before 2024	University of Wisconsin–Whitewater	Whitewater, Wisconsin	Inactive	
	2007	North Central College	Naperville, Illinois	Active	(Note: Chapter formed from the Leadership Ethics and Values (LEV) Program.)
	November 3, 2017	Valdosta State University	Valdosta, Georgia	Active	
		Villanova University	Villanova, Pennsylvania	Withdrew (local)	(Note: This chapter now calls itself "Blue Key" and has dropped references to the national organization.)
		Jackson State University	Jackson, Mississippi	Active	
