= Joseph Peltier =

American politician (1929–2014)

Member of the North Dakota Legislature from the 22 district
- In office 1979–1985

Personal details
- Born: Joseph Charles Peltier Jr. February 13, 1929 Bismark, North Dakota, U.S.
- Died: January 12, 2014 (aged 84) Fargo, North Dakota, U.S.
- Party: Republican
- Education: North Dakota State University

Joseph Charles "Joe" Peltier Jr. (February 13, 1929 – January 12, 2014) was an American politician and businessman. He served in the North Dakota House of Representatives and on the North Dakota State Board of Higher Education.

== Early life ==
Peltier was born on February 13, 1929 in Bismark, North Dakota. His parents were Marjorie L. (née Burgum) and Joseph C. Peltier. He grew up in Arthur, North Dakota and attended Arthur High School, graduating in 1947. He was an All-State guard with the Arthur Knights, State Class C Basketball champs.

Peltier attended North Dakota State University and graduated in 1951 with a degree in math and education. While there, he joined Sigma Alpha Epsilon, Alpha Phi Omega, and Blue Key Honor Society. He also served on the university's board of athletics.

== Career ==
After college, Peltier served in the United States Army for two years as a counterintelligence background investigator in Pennsylvania. In 1953, Peltier taught and coached at Martin High School in Martin, North Dakota, later becoming principal and superintendent. He started the school's first hot lunch program. He also worked on the family farm in Arthur.

He was the general manager and vice president of Arthur Farmers Elevator, his family's agribusiness, from 1955 to 1992. He was also a member of the company's board from 1957 to 2007. The company became the Arthur Companies in 1993.

Peltier was elected to the North Dakota House of Representatives for District 22 as a Republican in 1978, serving from 1979 to 1985. In this capacity, he helped establish the four-year medical school at North Dakota State University. While in the house, he served on the committees for Industry, Business, and Labor; Social Services; Transportation; and Veteran Affairs.

In 1992, Peltier stepped down from managing the Arthur Companies and became a sales associate with Braaten and Qualey Real Estate from 1992 to 1996. In 1993, Governor Ed Schafer appointed Peltier to the State Board of Higher Education, serving until 2000. Peltier was also the vice president of Interstate Seed and Grain from 1964 through 1984 and a board member of Great Plains Software from 1983 to 1999. He was chairman of the Cass County Crop Improvement Assocation, the North Dakota Sunflower Council, and the North Dakota Grain Dealers Convention.

== Honors ==
Peltier was inducted into the North Dakota Beta Sigma Alpha Epsilon Chapter Hall of Fame in 2012. The University of North Dakota School of Medicine and Health Sciences named the Joe & Norma Peltier East Atrium in their honor. In 2021, the North Dakota Legislature provided funding for the Peltier Complex at North Dakota State University, an agricultural research facility that also houses the Northern Crops Institute, laboratories for the USDA Agricultural Research Service, and the North Dakota Trade Office. An endowment for the Joe and Norma Peltier Vice President for Agriculture at North Dakota State University was established by his family in 2024.

== Personal life ==
Peltier married Norma K. Skunes on May 31, 1952. She had attended Moorehead State University and was also a high school basketball player and teacher. The couple had four children: Keith, Jeff, Suzette, and Betty Jo. They lived in Fargo and Arthur, North Dakota.

Peltier was chairman of the Southeastern North Dakota Community Action Agency and the Arthur Cemetery Board. He served on the board of Sanford Health in Fargo, St. Luke's Hospital, Cass County Parks, and the Dakota School Reorganization Committee. He was president of the Arthur Housing Development and the Arthur Lions Club. He was a member of the Arthur School Board and the Arthur Volunteer Fire Department.

Peltier volunteered with Service Corps of Retired Executives from 1992 to 2002 and with Volunteers in Overseas Cooperatives Assistance to Poland for one year. He was also a scout master with the Boy Scouts and coached Pee Wee and Junior Legion baseball. He was a member of the Arthur United Methodist Church, serving as lay leader, lay speaker, trustee, Sunday school teacher, and president of the church board. He belonged to the American Legion and the Masonic lodge.

Peltier and his wife established an endowment in 1999 to fund scholarships for students at the University of North Dakota School of Medicine and Health Sciences who were interested in practicing in rural North Dakota. Their ongoing support of the university resulted in the establishment of the Peltier Endowment for Innovation in Teaching, the Don Larew Scholarship, the Jessamine Slaughter Burgum Scholarship, and the Joe Peltier Award for Risk Management.

Peltier died on January 12, 2014 at Bethany on 42nd in Fargo, North Dakota. He was buried in the Arthur Cemetery in Arthur.
