= Laurel Historic District =

Historic district in Delaware, United States

- U.S. National Register of Historic Places
- U.S. Historic district
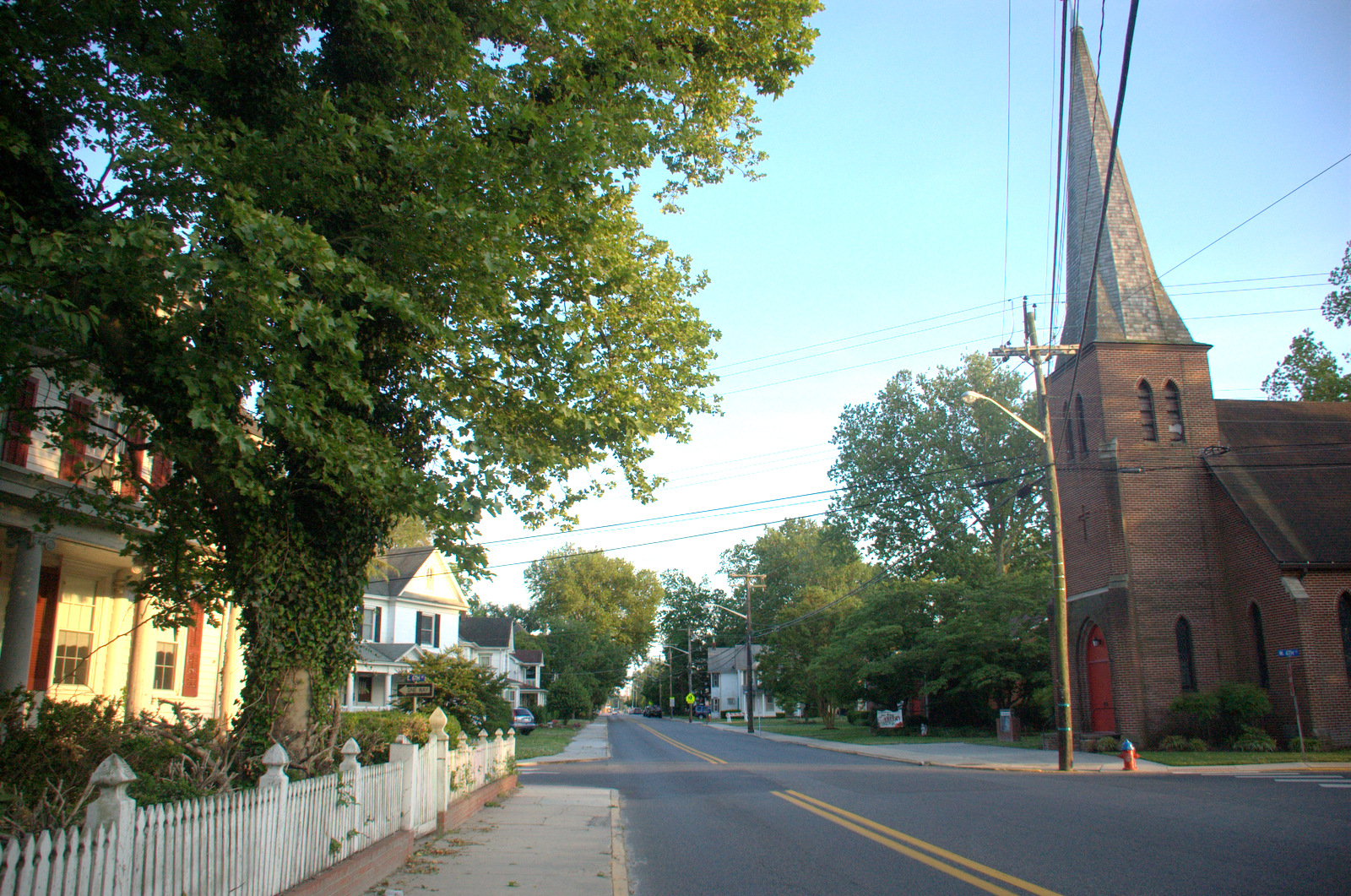

- Location within Delaware Location within the United States
- Location: West St. to Rossakatum Creek to Tenth St., Laurel, Delaware
- Coordinates: 38°33′22″N 75°34′17″W
- Area: 160 acres (65 ha)
- Architectural style: Late 19th And 20th Century Revivals, Late Victorian, I-house
- NRHP reference No.: 88001056
- Added to NRHP: July 27, 1988

Laurel Historic District is a national historic district located at Laurel, Sussex County, Delaware.

The district includes 701 contributing buildings, five contributing sites, four contributing structures, and one contributing object in the central business district and surrounding residential areas of Laurel. It includes residential, commercial, industrial, and institutional buildings dated from the late 18th century to the 1930s.

The residential buildings are mostly frame structures in the "I-house" plan. Most commercial buildings are brick structure and date to the early 20th century. Notable non-residential buildings include the Dashiell Building, Sussex Trust Building, Mellon Bank Building, Laurel Railroad Station (c. 1905), firehouse (1937), the original water company building, more recent town water buildings, post office (1935), Centenary Methodist Church, St. Phillip's Episcopal Church the Methodist Protestant Church, and the IOOF Meeting Hall.

The district was added to the National Register of Historic Places in 1988.
