= St. Bartholomew's Episcopal Church (Quantico, Maryland) =

Historic church in Maryland, United States

- U.S. National Register of Historic Places
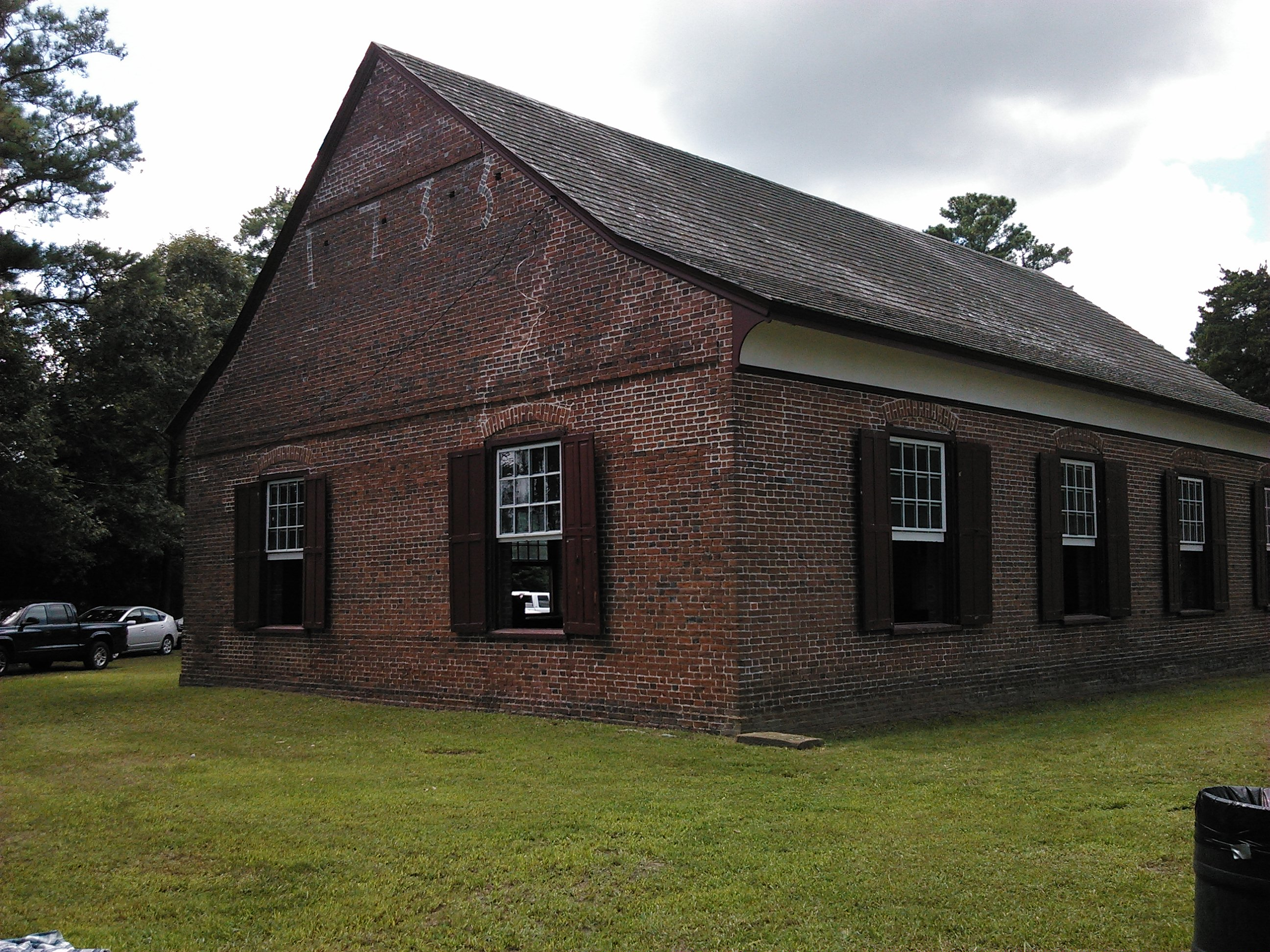

- Location within Maryland Location within the United States
- Location: Green Hill Church Rd., Quantico, Maryland
- Coordinates: 38°18′24.58″N 75°45′46.94″W
- Area: 1 acre (0.40 ha)
- Built: 1733
- NRHP reference No.: 75000929
- Added to NRHP: June 5, 1975

St. Bartholomew's Episcopal Church, also known as Green Hill Church, is a historic Episcopal church located near Quantico in Wicomico County, Maryland.

== History ==
Stepney Parish, as it was originally named, was one of the original 30 Anglican parishes in the Province of Maryland. It was built originally to serve the needs of Green Hill Town, a port of entry created as part of an Act of Provincial Assembly in 1706. However, the town never succeeded, although nearby Salisbury, Maryland, founded three decades later, for much of the 19th century became Maryland's second busiest port, known for its export of seafood as well as agricultural products. This original Stepney parish church was renamed after the apostle St. Bartholomew in the mid-19th century as chapels were built nearby.

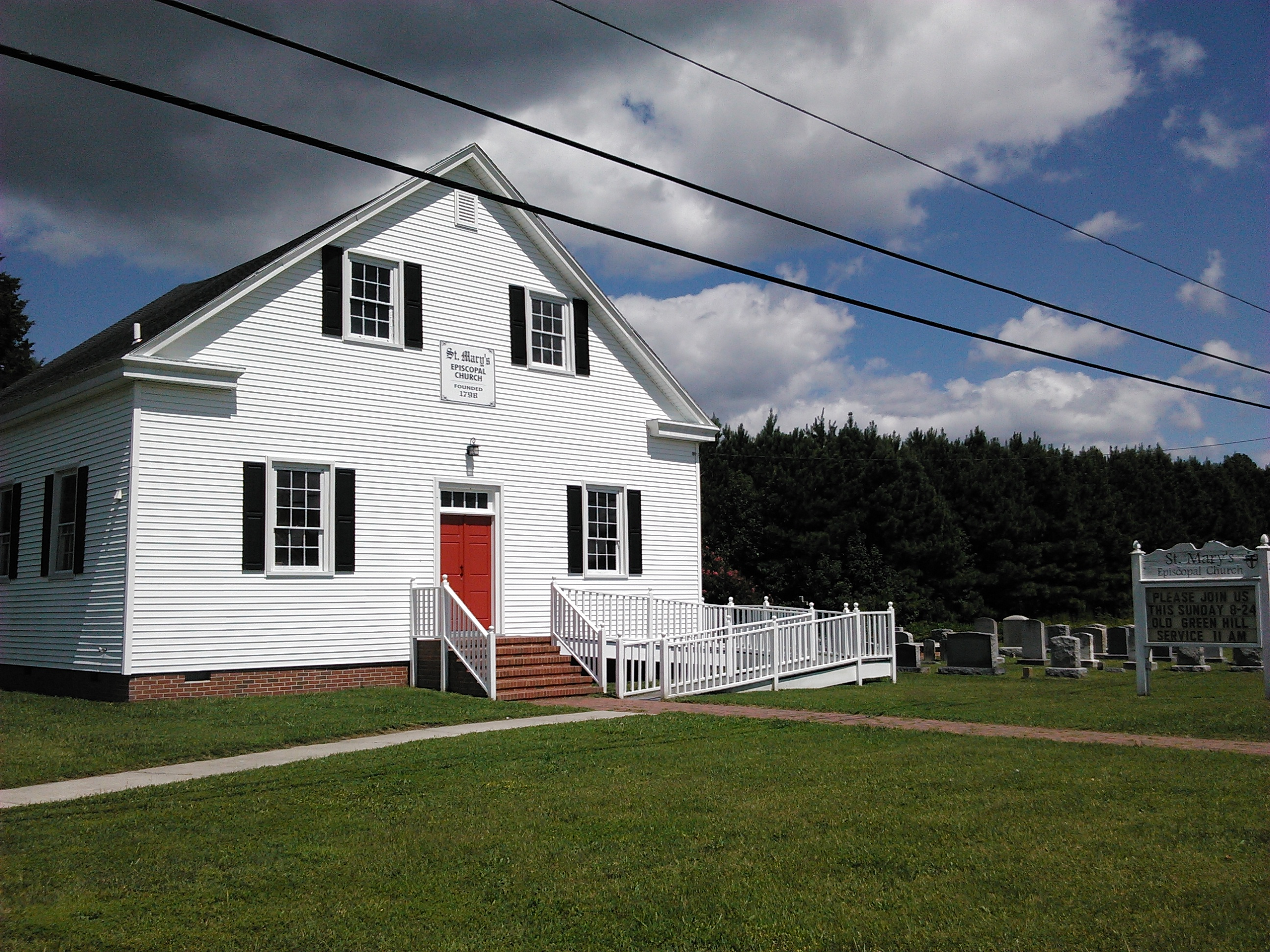
Current Stepney parish church

The current Stepney parish church is St. Mary's Tyaskin, Maryland, about the same mid-19th century age and style and distance from this historic church as St. Philip's Episcopal Church in Quantico (deriving from a Native American word for "place of dancing"). Since Stepney parish extended up the Wicomico river watershed up the Delmarva Peninsula into what became Sussex County, Delaware, Stepney Parish helped found several other parishes, most of which began as chapels of ease. These included Spring Hill Church on Route 50 (built in 1776 and which arson recently burned down) in nearby Hebron, St. Peter's in Salisbury (founded 1758, burned down in 1860 and rebuilt), as well as Old Christ Church (Laurel, Delaware) (built in 1772, in wood but the same style as this building) and St. Luke's Protestant Episcopal Church (Seaford, Delaware) (built in 1843, incorporating St. Mary's congregation founded in 1704 but disestablished in the American Revolution).

== Architecture ==
The single-story, Flemish bond gable-front brick church was built in 1733.

It was listed on the National Register of Historic Places in 1975.

The church no longer holds regular services. It is opened at least once a year in August for a St. Bartholomew's Day worship service held by several local Episcopal churches.

== See also ==
- Old Christ Church (Laurel, Delaware), a "parish of ease" associated with the Green Hill Church, executed in wood rather than brick
