= Old Christ Church (Laurel, Delaware) =

Historic church in Delaware, United States

- U.S. National Register of Historic Places
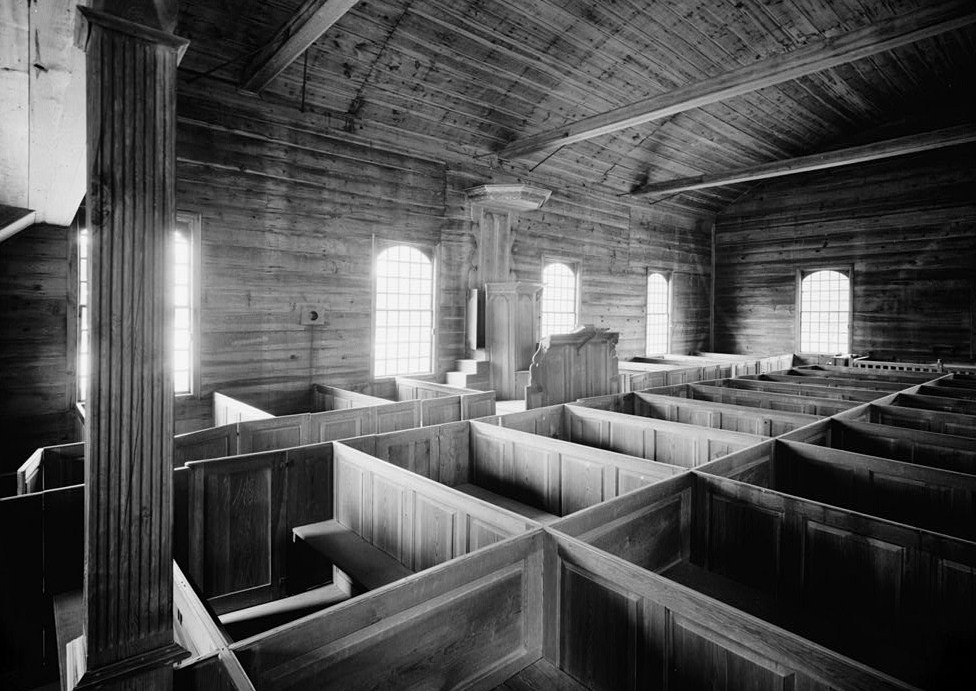
- Christ Church in 1960

- Location within Delaware Location within the United States
- Location: Southeast of Laurel at junction of Roads 465 and 465A, near Laurel, Delaware
- Coordinates: 38°33′40″N 75°32′16″W
- Built: 1772
- Architectural style: Georgian
- NRHP reference No.: 72000297
- Added to NRHP: April 13, 1972

Old Christ Church, also known as Old Lightwood, is a historic Episcopal church near Laurel, Delaware. The 1772 church resembles its parent church, Green Hill Church of Stepney Parish in Wicomico County, Maryland, except that while Stepney was built in brick, Christ Church is of wood construction. Its weathered appearance gave rise to a nickname "Old Lightwood," although it now is painted barn red.

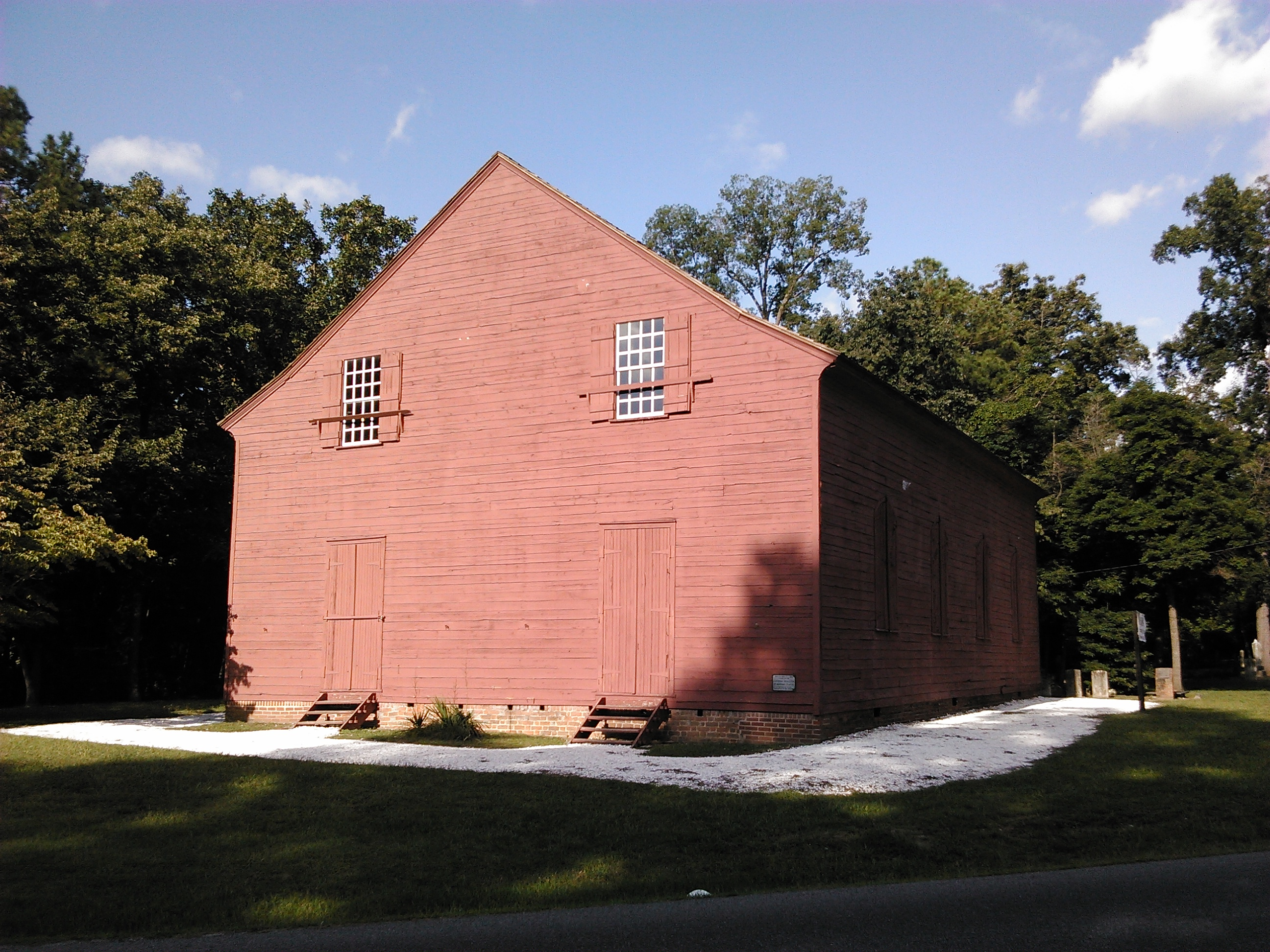
Old Christ Church, near Chipman's Mill (of which only the dam remains)

== History ==
Laurel did not exist when the colony of Maryland laid out its original 30 parishes in 1692. Scharf's History of Delaware reportedly states the last Native Americans in Delaware left from the Chipman's Pond area, which became the site of this Christ Church, in 1748. By 1772, a small settlement had been built, including a mill (now Chipman's Mill State Park), store, some houses, and iron foundry. The large Stepney Parish of the Church of England levied 80,000 pounds of tobacco from citizens and Robert Houston built this chapel of ease for residents of its northern part, often called simply "Broad Creek Chapel."

However, it turned out that both Maryland and Delaware claimed this relatively remote area known for its heavy stands of virgin pine trees. This dispute led to clarification of the boundary via the Transpeninsular Line and Mason–Dixon line, which placed the church in Delaware. It then became the "Mother Church" of Western Sussex County, Delaware. By 1821, Rev. Daniel Higbee was elected rector for this church and four others. St. Peter's Church in Lewes, Delaware was to pay him $180 per year, and this Christ Church and three others paid him $120 annually. Those less wealthy churches included Prince George's Chapel in Dagsboro, Delaware (begun 1755 as a chapel of ease for St. Martin's parish in Worcester County, Maryland and caught in the same boundary dispute), St. Paul's Church in Georgetown, Delaware, and St. George's Chapel about 9 miles south of Lewes. Pew rents at this church were once five dollars per year, and this parish helped to form St. Phillips in Laurel in 1834, St. Luke's in Seaford, Delaware in 1835, as well as St. John's Little Hill, St. Mark's in Millsboro in 1848, and All Saints in Delmar in 1886 when the railroad down the Delmarva Peninsula brought relative prosperity to this area. Four Delaware governors have been members: Nathaniel Mitchell, who is buried there, William B. Cooper, William H. H. Ross, and Elbert N. Carvel.

== Architecture ==
The 40-foot (12 m) by 60-foot (18 m) church has been repaired and painted on the exterior. It is particularly known for its simple, original interior, now one of only about a dozen in the Atlantic Coast of the United States that have never been plumbed or electrified. Only the window sashes are painted, and the pulpit stands on the middle of the north wall, with an altar at the east end. Box pews are high, with doors to each family section, signified by chalked names. The ceiling is a flattened barrel vault. A gallery remains at the west end, reached by stairs; it was once used for slaves and free negroes, with seats but no back rests.

== Current status ==
It was added to the National Register of Historic Places in 1972. Services are held monthly in the summer and occasionally in the fall.

== See also ==
- Chipman's Mill was across the dam from the church
