= Spring Garden (Laurel, Delaware) =

Historic house in Delaware, United States

- U.S. National Register of Historic Places
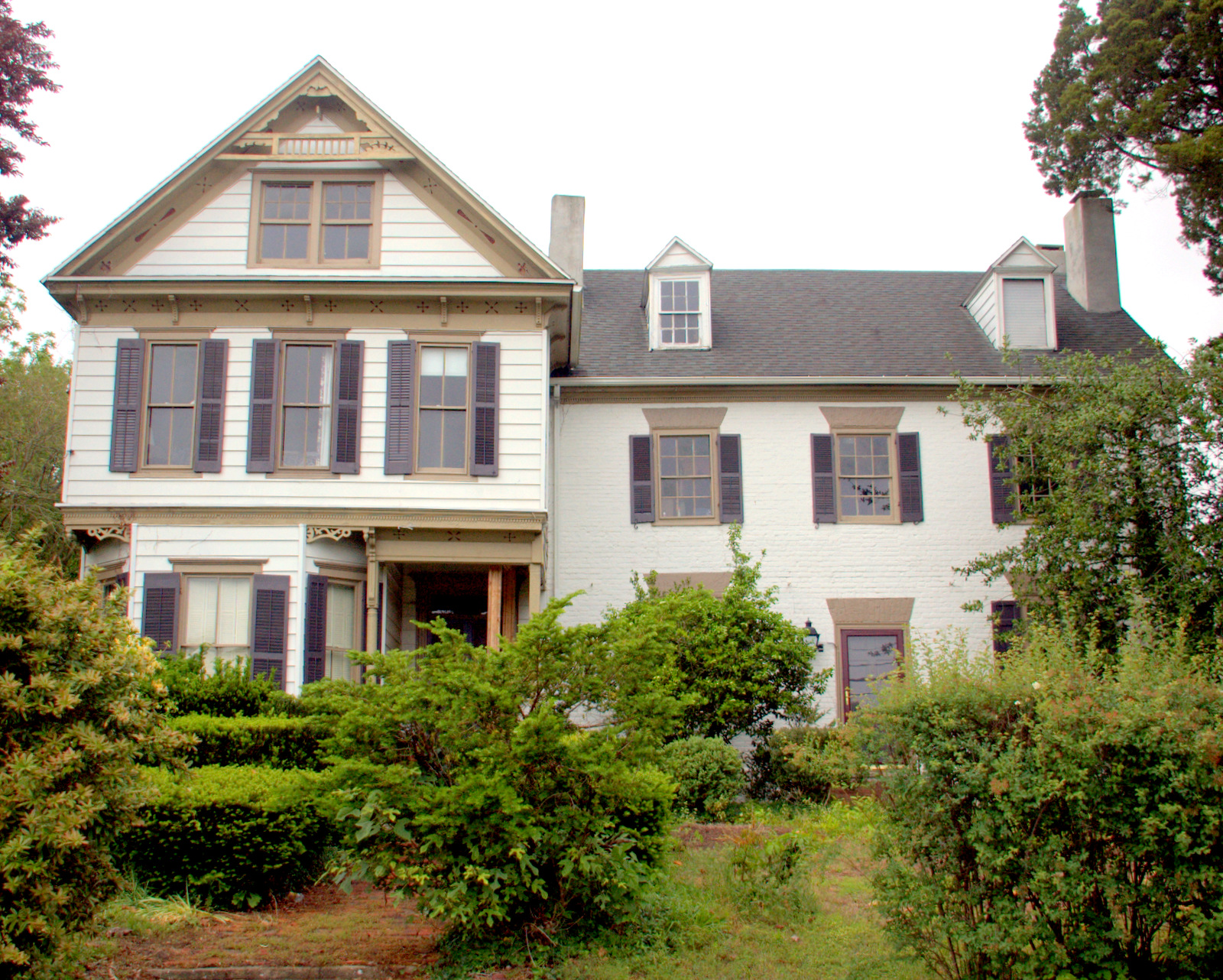

- Location within Delaware Location within the United States
- Location: Northeast of Laurel on Delaware Ave.
- Coordinates: 38°33′52″N 75°34′2″W
- Area: 1.5 acres (0.61 ha)
- Built: 1782
- Architectural style: Gothic, Georgian, Federal
- NRHP reference No.: 82002362
- Added to NRHP: August 26, 1982

Spring Garden, also known as the Lewis Homestead, is a historic home located near Laurel, Sussex County, Delaware. It is an L-shaped, brick-and-frame dwelling built in three sections over a 100-year period. The large brick main core was built about 1782, and is a 2 1/2-story, double-pile, center-hall plan structure with a three-bay facade in the Federal style. The interior has Georgian style details. It has a summer kitchen addition built about 1860, and it is a 1 1/2-story, single-pile structure added to the rear of the main core. About 1880, a large, two-story, frame addition was built onto the west gable end of the original brick section. It is in the Victorian Gothic style.

It was added to the National Register of Historic Places in 1982.
