= Laurel High School (Delaware) =

Location
- 1133 South Central Ave; Laurel, Delaware 19956; United States
- Coordinates: 38°33′00″N 75°34′10″W

Information
- Type: Public
- School district: Laurel School District
- Superintendent: Shawn Larrimore
- CEEB code: 080075
- President: Lois Hartstein
- Principal: Dean Ivory
- Grades: 9 - 12
- Enrollment: 724 (2023-2024)
- Average class size: 15-20
- Colors: Red and black
- Athletics conference: Henlopen Conference - Southern Division
- Mascot: Bulldog
- Rival: Delmar High School
- Website: laurelschooldistrict.org/our-schools/laurel-high-school/

Laurel High School is a public high school in Laurel, Delaware, a community in Sussex County. It is a part of the Laurel School District.

In addition to Laurel the school district serves Bethel.

== Notable alumni ==
- Carlton Elliott, NFL player
- Ron Waller, NFL player

== Notable faculty ==
- George Schollenberger
