= Wright Potato House =

- U.S. National Register of Historic Places
- Location within Delaware Location within the United States
- Location: Southwest of junction of Delaware Route 24 and Road 510, near Laurel, Delaware
- Coordinates: 38°31′57″N 75°36′35″W
- Area: 0.1 acres (0.040 ha)
- Architectural style: Potato house
- MPS: Sweet Potato Houses of Sussex County MPS
- NRHP reference No.: 90001702
- Added to NRHP: November 15, 1990

The Wright Potato House was a small 1 1/2-story building near Laurel, Delaware that was built to store harvested sweet potatoes. It was listed on the National Register of Historic Places in 1990.

== Background ==
Sweet potatoes were a dominant crop in Sussex County, Delaware, and numerous potato houses were built to store them. After a blight in the 1940s, the crop became less important and many potato houses were allowed to deteriorate or were converted to other use.

== Description ==
The frame building was about 20.17 feet (6.15 m) by 30.25 feet (9.22 m) in plan on a concrete and brick foundation. Windows were confined to the ends of the building, as are doors. The original "triple sheathing" was covered by asphalt shingles. The triple sheathing system consisted of wood weatherboards over diagonal wood sheathing on wood studs with straw insulation, and an interior sheathing of horizontal beaded tongue and groove boards. A wood shingle roof was likewise covered with asphalt shingles.

The Wright Potato House was typical of its kind, with a center aisle between potato bins on both levels. A sliding trap door provided ventilation between levels. A chimney was provided to allow the house to be heated sufficiently to avoid freezing the stored crop. It is listed on the Delaware Cultural and Historic Resources GIS system as destroyed or demolished.
