= Chipman's Mill =

- U.S. National Register of Historic Places
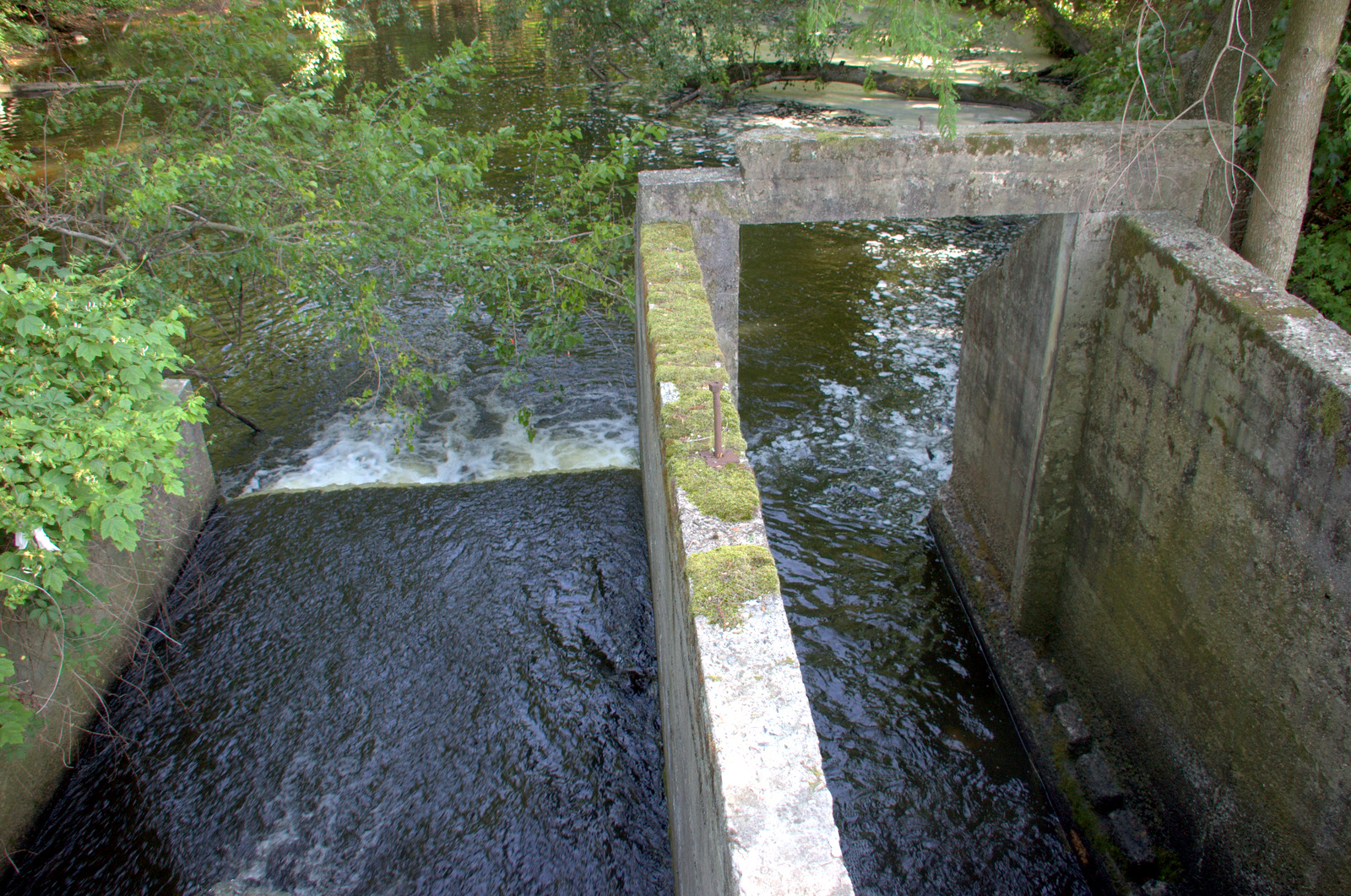
- Spillway

- Location within Delaware Location within the United States
- Location: East of Laurel on Road 465, Laurel, Delaware
- Coordinates: 38°33′42″N 75°32′24″W
- Area: less than one acre
- Built: 1884
- Built by: Chipman, Joseph
- NRHP reference No.: 78000918
- Added to NRHP: May 22, 1978

Chipman's Mill was located near Laurel, Delaware, and is now the name of a Delaware State Park which encompasses the mill pond, including a boat ramp for fishing (now the primary activity). Chipman's Mill functioned into the late 1940s. Arson destroyed the structures in November 1986.

The relatively remote area had been one of the last remaining residences of the Lenni Lenape, who left Delaware and the Chipman's Pond area in 1748. Settlers soon came, attracted by the available timber and water power. Christ Church was built nearby, which still survives.

The destroyed mill had two structures. In 1884, Joseph Chipman had built a one-story mill over the millrace (which survives), which contained turbines and millstones. The wooden superstructure featured mortise and tenon joinery. An adjoining two story section was moved to the site from elsewhere.

== See also ==
- Chipman Potato House, also built by the Chipman family nearby
- Old Christ Church (Laurel, Delaware), on the other side of the mill's dam
