= Ross Point School =

- U.S. National Register of Historic Places
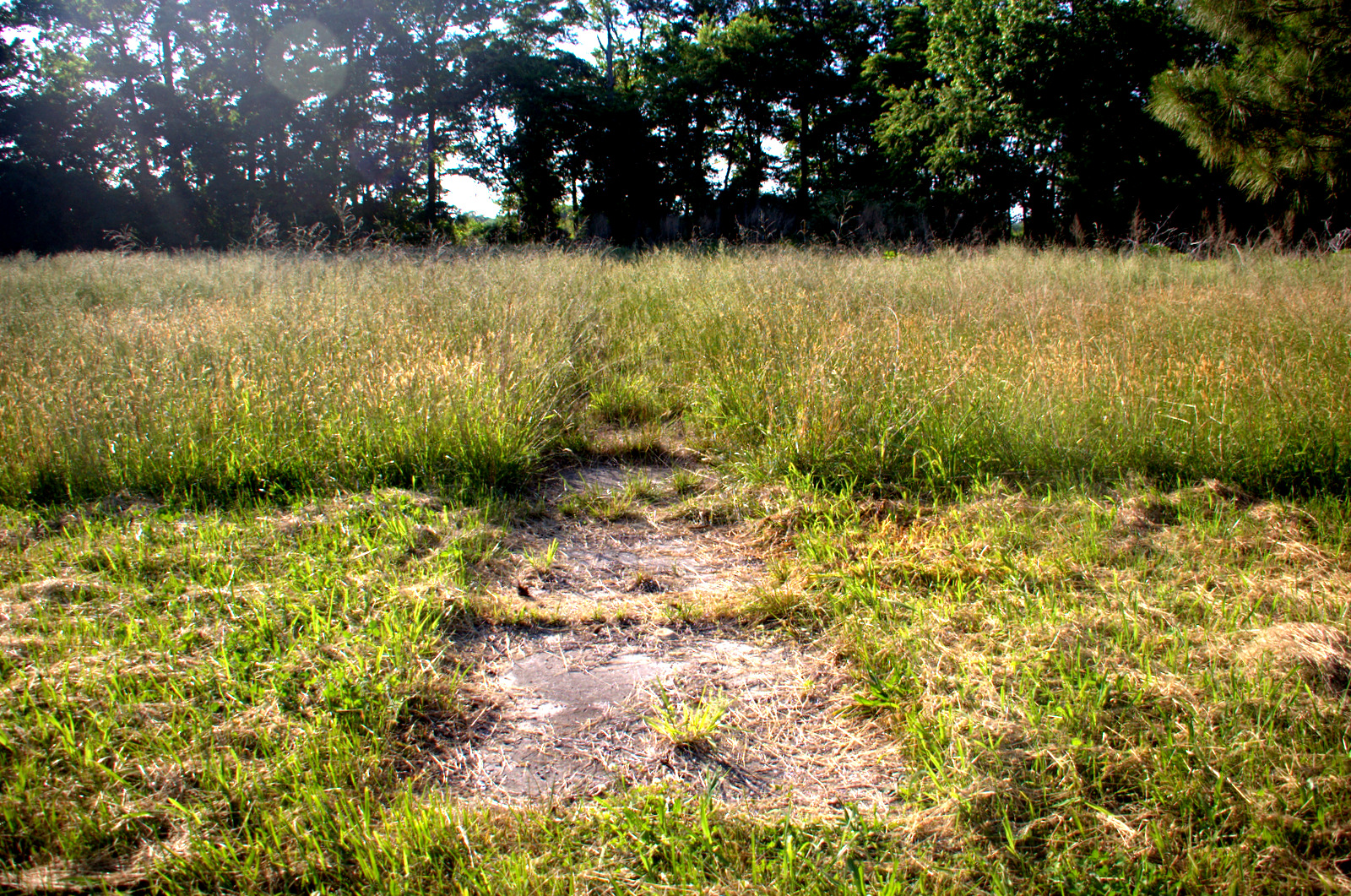
- Former location of the building.

- Location within Delaware Location within the United States
- Location: Road 448 near junction with Road 62, near Laurel, Delaware
- Coordinates: 38°33′23″N 75°27′15″W
- Area: 3.4 acres (1.4 ha)
- Built: 1922
- Built by: Guilbert and Betelle, Pierre S. du Pont
- Architectural style: Colonial Revival
- NRHP reference No.: 01000886
- Added to NRHP: August 17, 2001

Ross Point School was a historic rural, African-American school building located near Laurel, Sussex County, Delaware. Funding for the building was provided by Pierre S. du Pont. It was built in 1922, and was a rectangular, one-story wood-frame building in the Colonial Revival style. It had a hipped roof and cedar shingle siding. It had an entrance portico with a triangular pediment. The building remained in use as school until September 24, 1964, when it was officially consolidated into the Laurel Special School District.

It was added to the National Register of Historic Places in 2001. It is listed on the Delaware Cultural and Historic Resources GIS system as destroyed or demolished.
