= Blue Key Honor Society =

American collegiate honor society

- Founded: November 27, 1924; 101 years ago University of Florida
- Type: Honor
- Affiliation: Independent
- Status: Active
- Scope: National
- Motto: "Serving I Live"
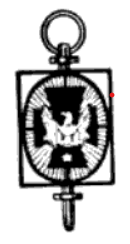
- Member badge
- Colors: Azure Blue and Gold
- Chapters: 39 active
- Headquarters: 101 College Drive, Station 61; Livingston, Alabama 35470; United States
- Website: www.bluekey.org

Blue Key Honor Society is an American national honor society for college upperclassmen. Blue Key has over 50 chartered collegiate chapters within the United States. It was established in 1924 at the University of Florida.

== History ==
Blue Key Honor Society was founded as Blue Key National Honor Fraternity at the University of Florida on November 27, 1924, by Dean Bert C. Riley. It was established as an honor society for college upperclassmen who were campus leaders. Its purpose was religious, nationalistic, academic, service, and social. It aimed to perpetuate a belief in God, to support and defend the government of the United States, to support good citizenship, to support academic achievement amongst college and university students, to enrich student life, and to develop adults who would serve and promote their communities.

In December 1925, Blue Key had chartered chapters at Emory and Henry College, Pennsylvania State University, the University of Pennsylvania, the University of Utah, Wabash, College, and Wittenburg College.

The UF chapter separated from the national Blue Key organization during the 1930s and has been known since as Florida Blue Key. The oldest extant chapter of Blue Key is located at Emory and Henry College and was founded in 1925. By 1962, the society had 121 chapters across the United States, with more than 40,000 initiates.

In 2014, the organization's name was officially changed to Blue Key Honor Society in the state of Kansas. Blue Key members participate in service activities on their college campuses and in the greater community. Its national headquarters is at 101 College Drive, Station 61 in Livingston, Alabama.

== Symbols ==
Blue Key's badge is an oblong gold key with an oval that has a raised border. Inside the oval is an eagle on top of a cross. Below the eagle is a small star. The gold oval and its ornamentation are surrounded by azure blue enamel.

The society's seal features its key, encircled by the words "Blue Key Honor Society" and the motto "Serving I Live". Its colors are azure blue and gold. At graduation, its members may wear an azure blue honor cord or a blue and gold medallion with a blue ribbon.

== Chapters ==
Blue Key has over 50 chartered collegiate chapters within the United States.

== Membership ==
Blue Key brings together a cross-section of students with leadership skills, moral character, and high academic achievement. Membership in Blue Key is offered to juniors and seniors who have excelled in scholarship, leadership, and service. The number of members in each chapter is limited to one percent of the student body. Potential members must be in the top third of their junior class with a 3.0 GPA.

In addition to student members, the society also awards a limited number of honorary memberships to alumni and faculty.

== Governance ==
Blue Key is governed by a national chapter, with officers who are elected from the membership at biennial conventions. In addition, the national chapter includes a representative from each chapter.

== Notable members ==
- Ted Howard, deputy general secretary for FIFA's CONCACAF
- Athena McNinch, model who was Miss Universe Guam 2018,
- Horace Elmo Nichols, chief justice of the Supreme Court of Georgia
- Joseph Peltier, North Dakota House of Representatives and North Dakota State Board of Higher Education
- George Schollenberger, sports coach inducted into the Delaware Sports Museum and Hall of Fame
- Lowell C. Smith, president of Nichols College
- Hugh Wilson, director, writer and actor

== See also ==
- Florida Blue Key
- Honor cords
