= Laurel School District (Delaware) =

Public school district in Delaware, United States

Laurel School District is a public school district in Laurel, Delaware, United States.

In addition to Laurel it serves Bethel.

== History ==
April 19, 1919, the Delaware General Assembly created the Laurel Special School District from Laurel School District 46. Laurel School District 158 and Laurel School District 212 merged into the Laurel Special district before the start of the 1919-1920 school year and on July 1, 1919, respectively. The special district was reorganized as the Laurel School District on July 1, 1969.

== Schools ==
High school

- Laurel High School

Middle schools

- Laurel Middle School

Elementary schools

- North Laurel Elementary School

== Previous schools ==
- Paul Laurence Dunbar Elementary School (closed 2019)
