= Bethel Historic District (Bethel, Delaware) =

Historic district in Delaware, United States

- U.S. National Register of Historic Places
- U.S. Historic district
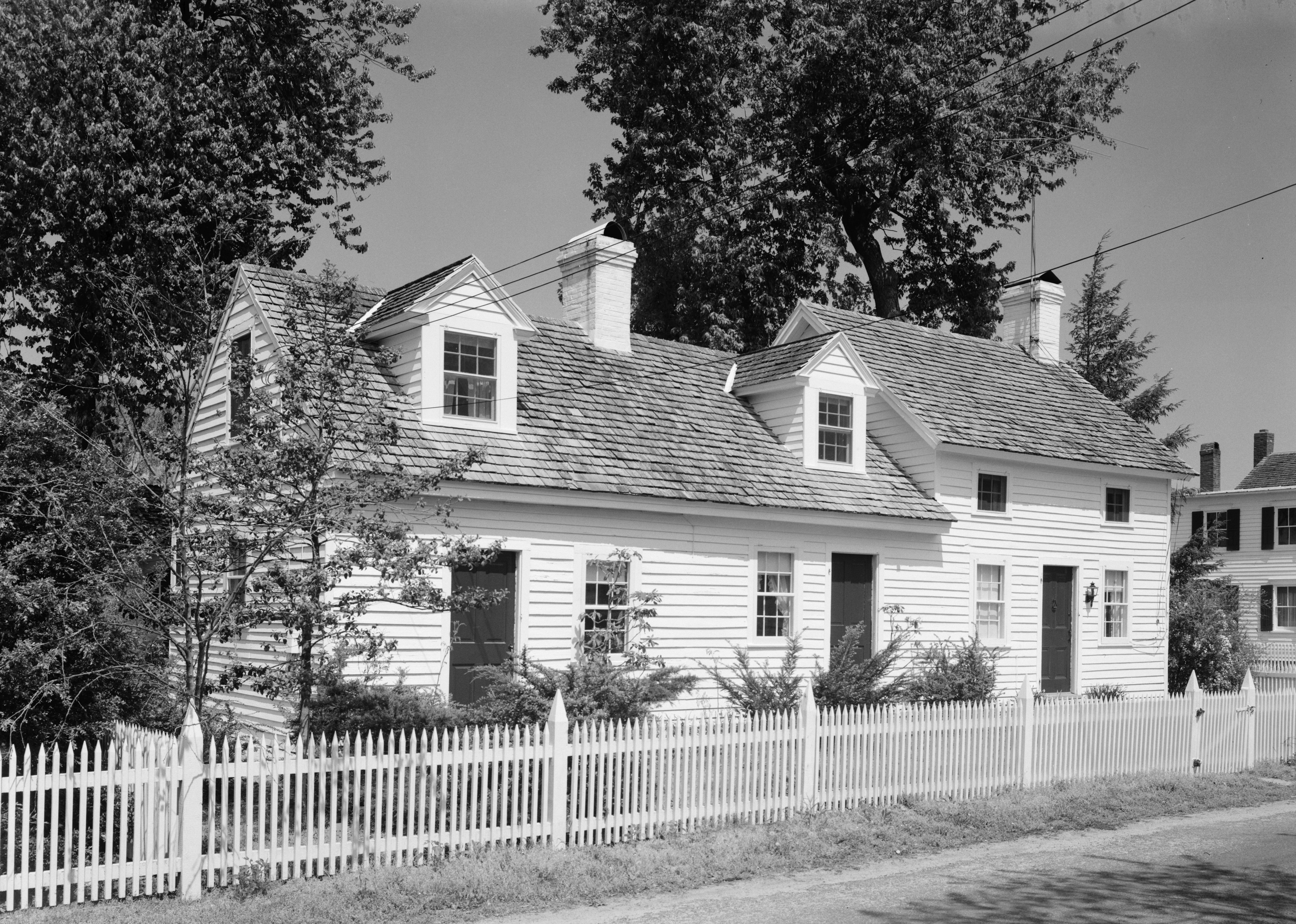
- Ship-Carpenter's House, Bethel Historic District, June 1960

- Location within Delaware Location within the United States
- Location: 0.4 mi. W of Laurel, Bethel, Delaware
- Coordinates: 38°34′38″N 75°37′55″W
- Area: 55 acres (22 ha)
- Architectural style: Italianate, Victorian
- NRHP reference No.: 75000544
- Added to NRHP: February 10, 1975

Bethel Historic District, also known as Lewisville and Lewis' Wharf, is a national historic district located at Bethel, Sussex County, Delaware. The district includes four contributing buildings. They are representative of dwellings built by the village's skilled ship carpenters. They are the two Ship-Carpenter Houses, the Moore House, and 4 R's Farm house. The two Ship-Carpenter Houses were built before 1868, and each consists of a low, 1 1/2-story section with an adjoining rear wing and a taller 1 1/2-story addition. The Moore House is a 1 1/2-story dwelling with a 2 1/2-story addition and kitchen wing. It features a Victorian cross-gable roof adorned with gingerbread trim. The "4 R's Farm" house is a square, two-story, three bay dwelling in the Italianate style.

It was added to the National Register of Historic Places in 1975.

== See also ==
- National Register of Historic Places listings in Sussex County, Delaware
