= Laurel, Delaware =

- Town
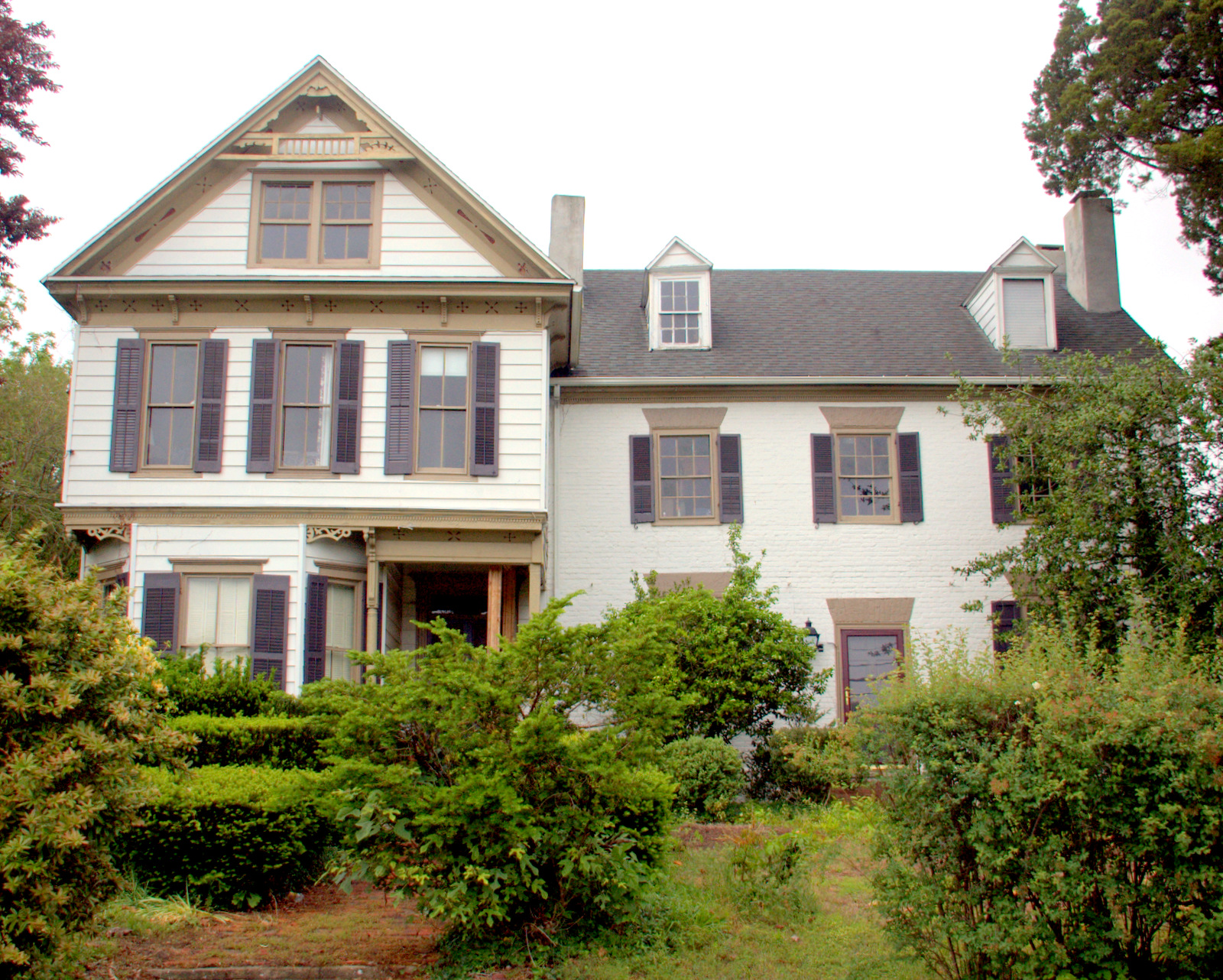
- Spring Garden

- Seal
- Etymology: Laurel bushes that grew alongside Broad Creek
- Motto: "Great Things Come Naturally"
- Location of Laurel in Sussex County, Delaware.

- Location within the state of Delaware Laurel (the United States)
- Coordinates: 38°33′23″N 75°34′17″W
- Country: United States
- State: Delaware
- County: Sussex

Area
  - Total: 2.86 sq mi (7.40 km^{2})
  - Land: 2.76 sq mi (7.16 km^{2})
  - Water: 0.093 sq mi (0.24 km^{2})
- Elevation: 26 ft (7.9 m)

Population (2020)
  - Total: 3,865
  - Density: 1,397.2/sq mi (539.47/km^{2})
- Time zone: UTC−5 (Eastern (EST))
  - Summer (DST): UTC−4 (EDT)
- ZIP code: 19956
- Area code: 302
- FIPS code: 10-41310
- GNIS feature ID: 214203
- Website: www.townoflaurel.net

Laurel is a town in Sussex County, Delaware, United States. The population was 3,865 at the time of the 2020 census. Laurel is part of the Salisbury, Maryland-Delaware Metropolitan Statistical Area. It once hosted the Laurel Blue Hens of the Eastern Shore Baseball League.

== History ==
The site of the town of Laurel was a Nanticoke settlement known as Broad Creek Town during most of the eighteenth century. Its Nanticoke name is unknown. The Indian settlement was created on tracts known as Bachelor's Delight and Greenland in 1711 when the government of Maryland, who originally claimed this part of Delaware, set aside land for the Nanticoke tribe. Nearly all the Indian residents left within 50 years, relocating to western Pennsylvania. The present town was laid out along the Broad Creek in the 1790s and was named for the laurel bushes that grew alongside the creek.

On March 29, 1929, the town was merged with the neighboring town of North Laurel which comprised most of the current town north of Broad Creek (then known as Laurel River). This merger was not properly reported to the United States Census Bureau, which resulted in the North Laurel's population not being included with the population of Laurel in the 1930 United States census. As such, the US Census Bureau did not immediately make a change to the 1930 population statistics once the error was discovered, however it acknowledged in 1940 that the correct population for Laurel in 1930 was 2,542.

West Laurel is one of Delaware's oldest free Black communities. According to the Delaware Historical Society, West Laurel dates back to the 1790s. At some point in the 1870s Captain Theodore Marsh settled in West Laurel, brought property, broke the property down into plots and sold them to his shipmates. The graveyard for New Zion United Methodist church in West Laurel, which has been around since the early 1800s is the resting place of Marsh and his shipmates.

== Geography ==
Laurel is located on the Atlantic Coastal Plain in southwestern Delaware.

According to the United States Census Bureau, the town has a total area of 1.7 square miles (4.4 km^{2}), of which 1.7 square miles (4.4 km^{2}) is land and 0.1 square miles (0.26 km^{2}) (4.07%) is water.

== Demographics ==
Historical population
Census	Pop.	Note	%±
1860	970		—
1870	1,080		11.3%
1880	1,022		−5.4%
1890	2,388		133.7%
1900	1,825		−23.6%
1910	2,166		18.7%
1920	2,253		4.0%
1930	2,542		12.8%
1940	2,884		13.5%
1950	2,700		−6.4%
1960	2,709		0.3%
1970	2,408		−11.1%
1980	3,052		26.7%
1990	3,226		5.7%
2000	3,668		13.7%
2010	3,708		1.1%
2020	3,865		4.2%
U.S. Decennial Census

=== 2020 census ===
As of the 2020 census, Laurel had a population of 3,865. The median age was 29.1 years. 34.8% of residents were under the age of 18 and 11.1% of residents were 65 years of age or older. For every 100 females there were 83.1 males, and for every 100 females age 18 and over there were 75.2 males age 18 and over.

99.6% of residents lived in urban areas, while 0.4% lived in rural areas.

There were 1,316 households in Laurel, of which 47.7% had children under the age of 18 living in them. Of all households, 31.5% were married-couple households, 15.9% were households with a male householder and no spouse or partner present, and 45.6% were households with a female householder and no spouse or partner present. About 23.1% of all households were made up of individuals and 10.1% had someone living alone who was 65 years of age or older.

There were 1,504 housing units, of which 12.5% were vacant. The homeowner vacancy rate was 4.3% and the rental vacancy rate was 7.1%.

Racial composition as of the 2020 census
Race	Number	Percent
White	1,515	39.2%
Black or African American	1,657	42.9%
American Indian and Alaska Native	16	0.4%
Asian	28	0.7%
Native Hawaiian and Other Pacific Islander	2	0.1%
Some other race	256	6.6%
Two or more races	391	10.1%
Hispanic or Latino (of any race)	522	13.5%

=== 2000 census ===
As of the 2000 census, 3,668 people, 1,389 households, and 957 families resided in the town. The population density was 2,215.9 inhabitants per square mile (855.6/km^{2}). There were 1,561 housing units at an average density of 943.0 units per square mile (364.1 units/km^{2}). The racial makeup of the town was 55.56% White, 39.42% African American, 0.35% Native American, 0.95% Asian, 0.03% Pacific Islander, 1.20% from other races, and 2.48% from two or more races. Hispanic or Latino of any race were 2.32% of the population.

There were 1,389 households, out of which 37.9% had children under the age of 18 living with them, 39.4% were married couples living together, 26.1% had a female householder with no husband present, and 31.1% were non-families. 26.4% of all households were made up of individuals, and 12.0% had someone living alone who was 65 years of age or older.

In the town, the age distribution of the population shows 33.2% under the age of 18, 10.6% from 18 to 24, 26.5% from 25 to 44, 16.7% from 45 to 64, and 12.9% who were 65 years of age or older. The median age was 30 years. For every 100 females, there were 83.1 males. For every 100 females age 18 and over, there were 72.9 males.

The median income for a household in the town was $28,321, and the median income for a family was $30,329. Males had a median income of $28,006 versus $18,550 for females. The per capita income for the town was $13,594. About 18.7% of families and 21.2% of the population were below the poverty line, including 33.6% of those under age 18 and 11.4% of those age 65 or over.

== Arts and culture ==
Sites listed on the National Register of Historic Places include:

- Chipman Potato House
- Chipman's Mill
- Collins Potato House
- Hearn Potato House
- E. L. Hitch Potato House
- Laurel Historic District
- Moore Potato House
- Old Christ Church
- Phillips Potato House
- Ralph Potato House
- Rider Potato House
- Ross Point School
- Spring Garden
- Stanley Potato House
- Wright Potato House

=== Library ===
Laurel Public Library was established in 1909. A new library opened in 2006.

== Sports ==
The District 3 All-Stars from Laurel won the senior Little League Softball World Series in 2011.

The Laurel Blue Hens were a member of the minor league Eastern Shore League in 1922 and 1923, playing at League Park.

== Education ==
It is within the Laurel School District. Laurel High School is the local high school.

== Media ==
- Laurel Star, a weekly local newspaper.
- Leader and State Register, a weekly local newspaper.
- WBOC-TV (Channel 16, CBS Affiliate) has its broadcast tower in Laurel.
- FOX 21 (Channel 21, FOX Affiliate) has its broadcast tower in Laurel.
- WKDB (95.3FM known as "Studio 95.3")

== Infrastructure ==
=== Transportation ===
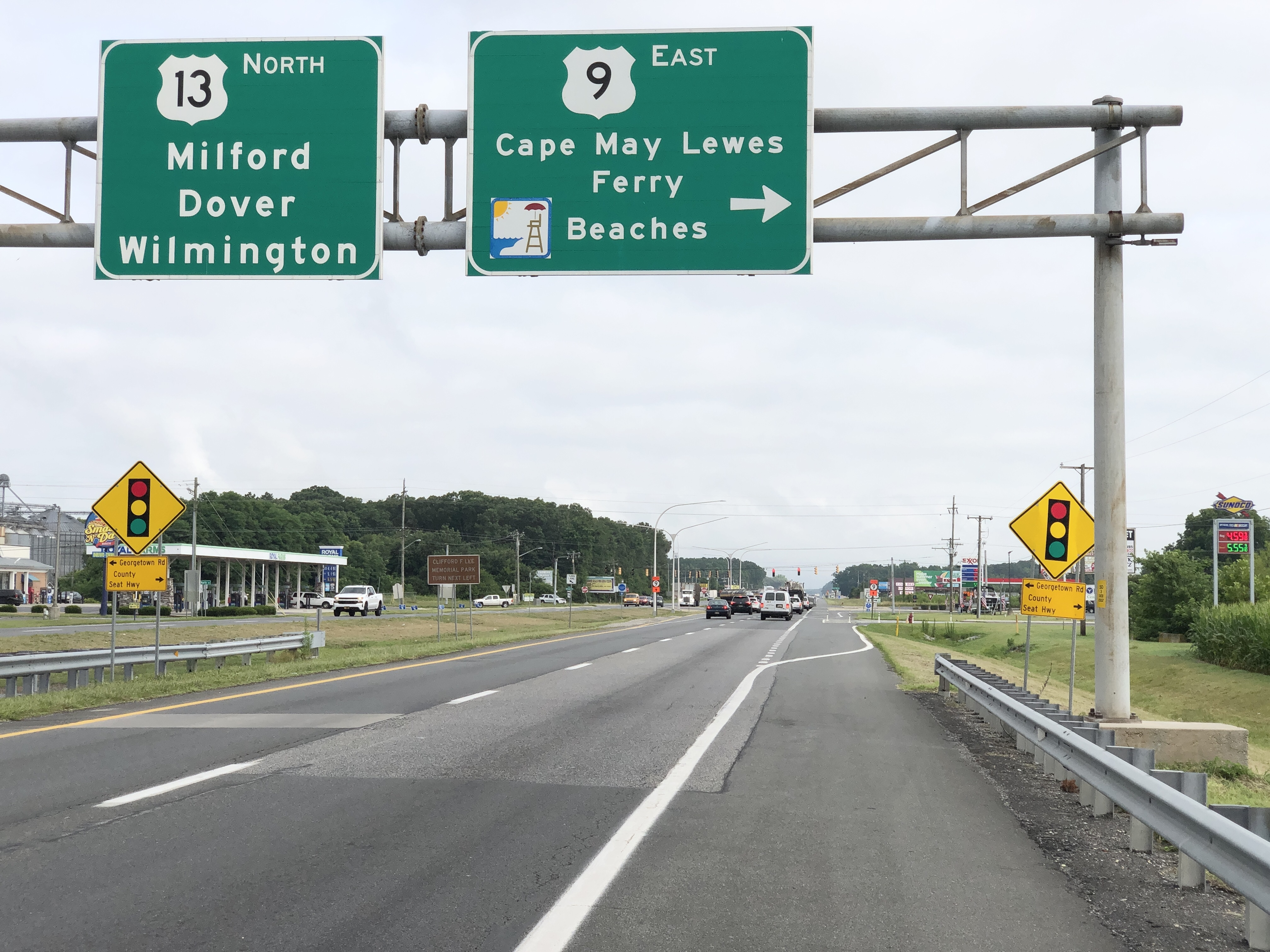
US 13 northbound at US 9 in Laurel

Roads are the primary means of travel to and from Laurel. U.S. Route 13 (Sussex Highway) is the most significant highway serving the town, connecting northwards towards Dover and southward to Salisbury. U.S. Route 9 also serves Laurel, heading northeastward from its terminus at US 13 toward Georgetown along County Seat Highway. Delaware Route 24 is the third numbered route to serve the town, traversing the region on an east–west alignment through the center of the town. DART First State operates the Route 212 bus that connects Laurel with Delmar and Georgetown. The Delmarva Central Railroad's Delmarva Subdivision line passes north–south through Laurel.

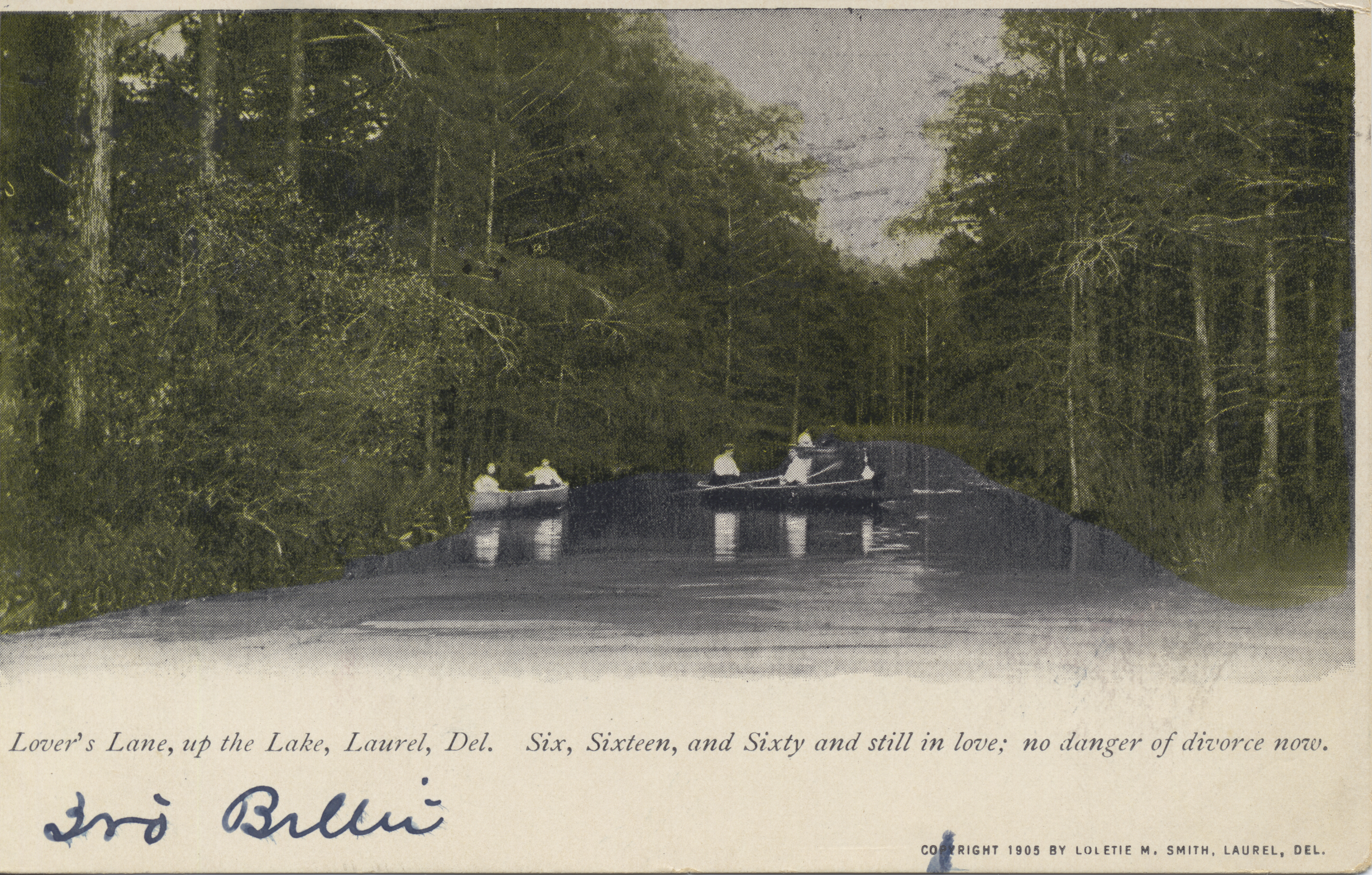
1907 postcard showing Laurel in the Miami University Bowden Postcard Collection

== Notable people ==
- Richard H. Ellis, General, United States Air Force
- Mark Briscoe, Professional wrestler
- Jay Briscoe, Professional wrestler
- Bert Carvel, former Governor of Delaware
- John Collins, former governor of Delaware (1821–1825)
- William B. Cooper, former governor of Delaware
- Timothy Dukes, Republican member of the Delaware House of Representatives
- Carlton Elliott, former NFL player
- Alex Ellis, current NFL player
- Dallas Marvil, All-American football player, 1931
- Joshua H. Marvil, former governor of Delaware
- Nathaniel Mitchell, former governor of Delaware (1805–1808), Member of the Continental Congress
- Ron Waller, former NFL player and coach
- Warren K. Lewis, professor at the Massachusetts Institute of Technology (MIT)
