= Ron Waller =

American football player and coach (1933–2018)

No. 27
- Position: Running back

Personal information
- Born: February 14, 1933; Hastings, Florida, U.S.
- Died: December 16, 2018 (aged 85); Blades, Delaware, U.S.
- Listed height: 5 ft 11 in (1.80 m)
- Listed weight: 180 lb (82 kg)

Career information
- High school: Laurel (Laurel, Delaware)
- College: Maryland (1951–1954)
- NFL draft: 1955: 2nd round, 15th overall pick

Career history

Playing
- Los Angeles Rams (1955–1958); Los Angeles Chargers (1960)

Coaching
- Wilmington Clippers (1967) Head coach; Harrisburg Capitols (1968) Head coach; Pottstown Firebirds (1969-1970) Offensive assistant; Norfolk Neptunes (1971) Head coach; San Diego Chargers (1972) Special teams coach; San Diego Chargers (1973) Interim head coach; Philadelphia Bell (1974) Head coach; Chicago Blitz (1984) Offensive coordinator

Awards and highlights
- Second-team All-Pro (1955); Pro Bowl (1955); National champion (1953); First-team All-ACC (1954); Delaware Sports Hall of Fame (1977)

Career NFL/AFL statistics
- Rushing yards: 1,569
- Rushing average: 5.3
- Receptions: 44
- Receiving yards: 443
- Total touchdowns: 9
- Stats at Pro Football Reference

Head coaching record
- Regular season: 1–5–0 (.167)
- Coaching profile at Pro Football Reference

Ron Waller (February 14, 1933 – December 16, 2018) was an American football player and coach. He played professionally in the National Football League (NFL) as a running back for the Los Angeles Rams from 1955 through 1958 and for the American Football League's Los Angeles Chargers in 1960. He was the interim head coach of the NFL's San Diego Chargers for the final six games of the 1973 season and held the same position with the Philadelphia Bell of the World Football League in 1974. Waller was also the head coach of the Wilmington Clippers and the Norfolk Neptunes of the Atlantic Coast Football League.

Prior to his professional career, Waller played for Laurel High School in Laurel, Delaware, and the University of Maryland, College Park. In 1977, he was inducted into the Delaware Sports Hall of Fame. Waller died in Delaware on December 16, 2018, at the age of 85.

== See also ==
- List of American Football League players
