= Bethel, Delaware =

- Town
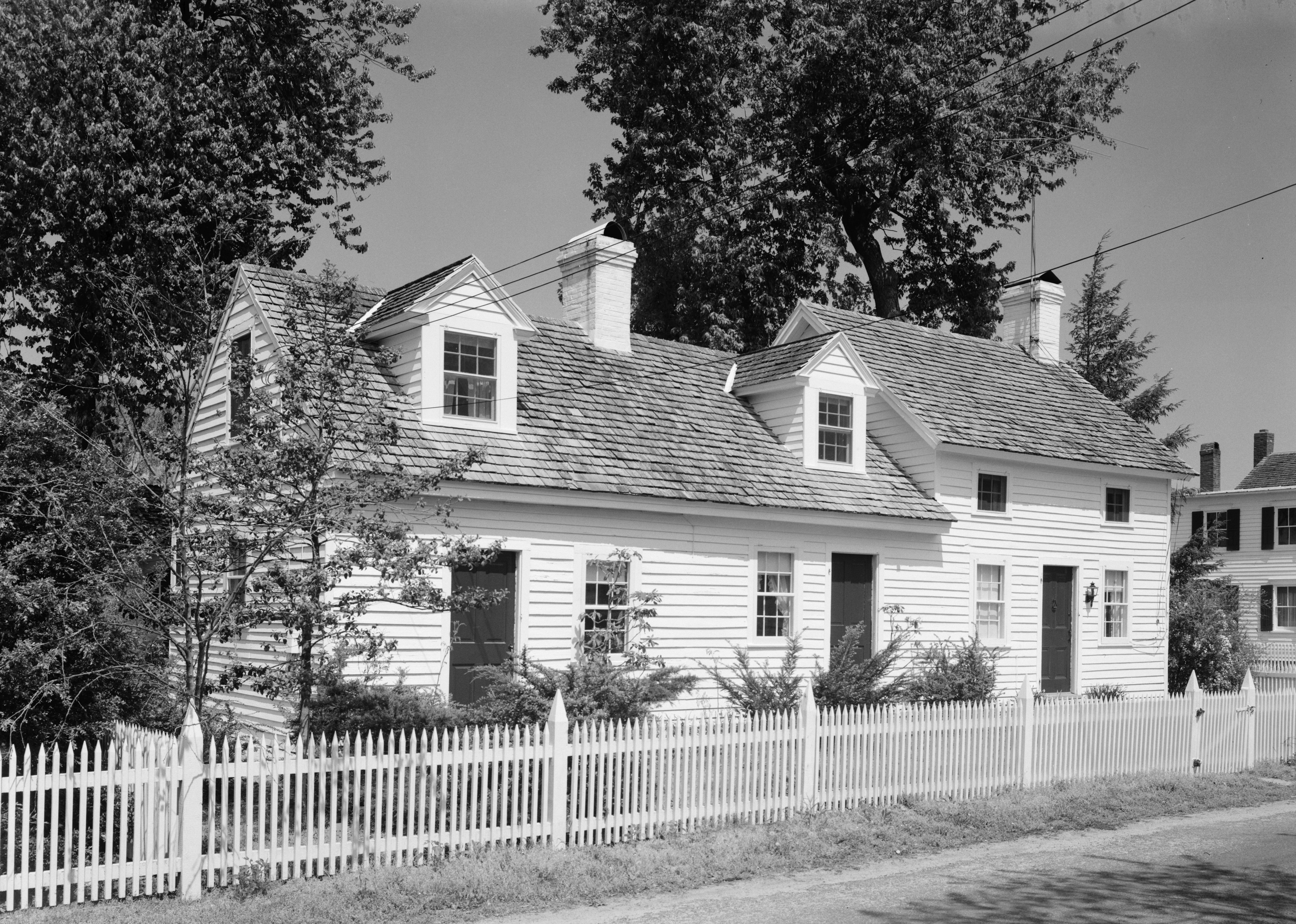
- Ship-Carpenter's House

- Logo

- Location of Bethel in Sussex County, Delaware.

- Location within the state of Delaware Bethel (the United States)
- Coordinates: 38°34′14″N 75°37′10″W
- Country: United States
- State: Delaware
- County: Sussex
- Settled: 1840s
- Incorporated: April 4, 1907

Area
  - Total: 0.44 sq mi (1.14 km^{2})
  - Land: 0.44 sq mi (1.14 km^{2})
  - Water: 0 sq mi (0.00 km^{2})
- Elevation: 23 ft (7.0 m)

Population (2020)
  - Total: 239
  - Density: 543/sq mi (209.5/km^{2})
- Time zone: UTC−5 (Eastern (EST))
  - Summer (DST): UTC−4 (EDT)
- ZIP code: 19931
- Area code: 302
- FIPS code: 10-05820
- GNIS feature ID: 213641
- Website: bethel.delaware.gov

Bethel is a town in Sussex County, Delaware, United States. According to 2020 Census Bureau figures, the population of the town is 239.

== History ==
Bethel is a small, well-preserved 19th century shipbuilding and trading community. Wooden sailing vessels were constructed by Bethel's skilled ship carpenters until the early-20th century. The most significant class of Bethel craft were the Chesapeake sailing rams, which originated from this Broad Creek port.

The town of Bethel was formerly known as both Lewis' Wharf and Lewisville. The site was originally part of five hundred acres granted by the province of Maryland to James Caldwell in 1728. Settlement of this area was inhibited by the continuous boundary disputes between Maryland and the Penn family. In 1795, Kendal Major Lewis, the founder of Bethel, acquired much of James Caldwell's original grant as well as a smaller tract on Broad Creek, known as Mitchell's Harbor. Here he established a landing that grew to become a prosperous trading center. In the 1840s, Lewis' Wharf developed into a thriving community known as Lewisville.

Within the next 20 years, Lewisville was to become an important shipbuilding center. The extensive forests along the Nanticoke provided abundant supplies of virgin pine, oak and cypress. In 1869, Jonathan Moore of Lewisville established the most important marine railway on the peninsula south of Wilmington. John M. C. Moore, superintendent of Lewisville's Marine Railway Company, originated the well-known Chesapeake sailing ram. This class of sailing vessel was designed as an economical, flatbottom, three masted schooner; its operation required only a small crew. Rams were used for coastal freight primarily on the Chesapeake Bay. Between 1871 and 1918, as many as thirty rams were built in Lewisville shipyards.

In 1880, when the village applied for a post office, its name was changed to Bethel, since another Lewisville, Delaware, post office already existed.

Bethel's population was 400 in 1890, and was 387 in 1900.

The Bethel Historic District was added to the National Register of Historic Places in 1975.

== Geography ==
Bethel is located at 38°34′14″N 75°37′10″W (38.5706707, –75.6193717).

According to the United States Census Bureau, the town has a total area of 0.4 square miles (1.0 km^{2}), all land.

== Demographics ==
Historical population
Census	Pop.	Note	%±
1880	298		—
1890	378		26.8%
1910	370		—
1920	222		−40.0%
1930	219		−1.4%
1940	245		11.9%
1950	271		10.6%
1960	236		−12.9%
1970	219		−7.2%
1980	197		−10.0%
1990	178		−9.6%
2000	184		3.4%
2010	171		−7.1%
2020	239		39.8%
U.S. Decennial Census

At the 2000 census there were 184 people, 78 households, and 56 families living in the town. The population density was 413.2 inhabitants per square mile (159.5/km^{2}). There were 97 housing units at an average density of 217.8 per square mile (84.1/km^{2}). The racial makeup of the town was 96.20% White, 2.72% African American and 1.09% Asian. Hispanic or Latino of any race were 0.54%.

Of the 78 households 23.1% had children under the age of 18 living with them, 60.3% were married couples living together, 9.0% had a female householder with no husband present, and 28.2% were non-families. 24.4% of households were one person and 12.8% were one person aged 65 or older. The average household size was 2.36 and the average family size was 2.82.

The age distribution was 20.7% under the age of 18, 7.6% from 18 to 24, 23.9% from 25 to 44, 28.8% from 45 to 64, and 19.0% 65 or older. The median age was 44 years. For every 100 females, there were 89.7 males. For every 100 females age 18 and over, there were 84.8 males.

The median household income was $34,107 and the median family income was $58,750. Males had a median income of $33,750 versus $21,500 for females. The per capita income for the town was $25,254. About 3.6% of families and 2.5% of the population were below the poverty line, including none of those under the age of eighteen and 14.3% of those sixty five or over.

== Education ==
Bethel's school district is the Laurel School District. Laurel High School is the local high school.

== Transportation ==
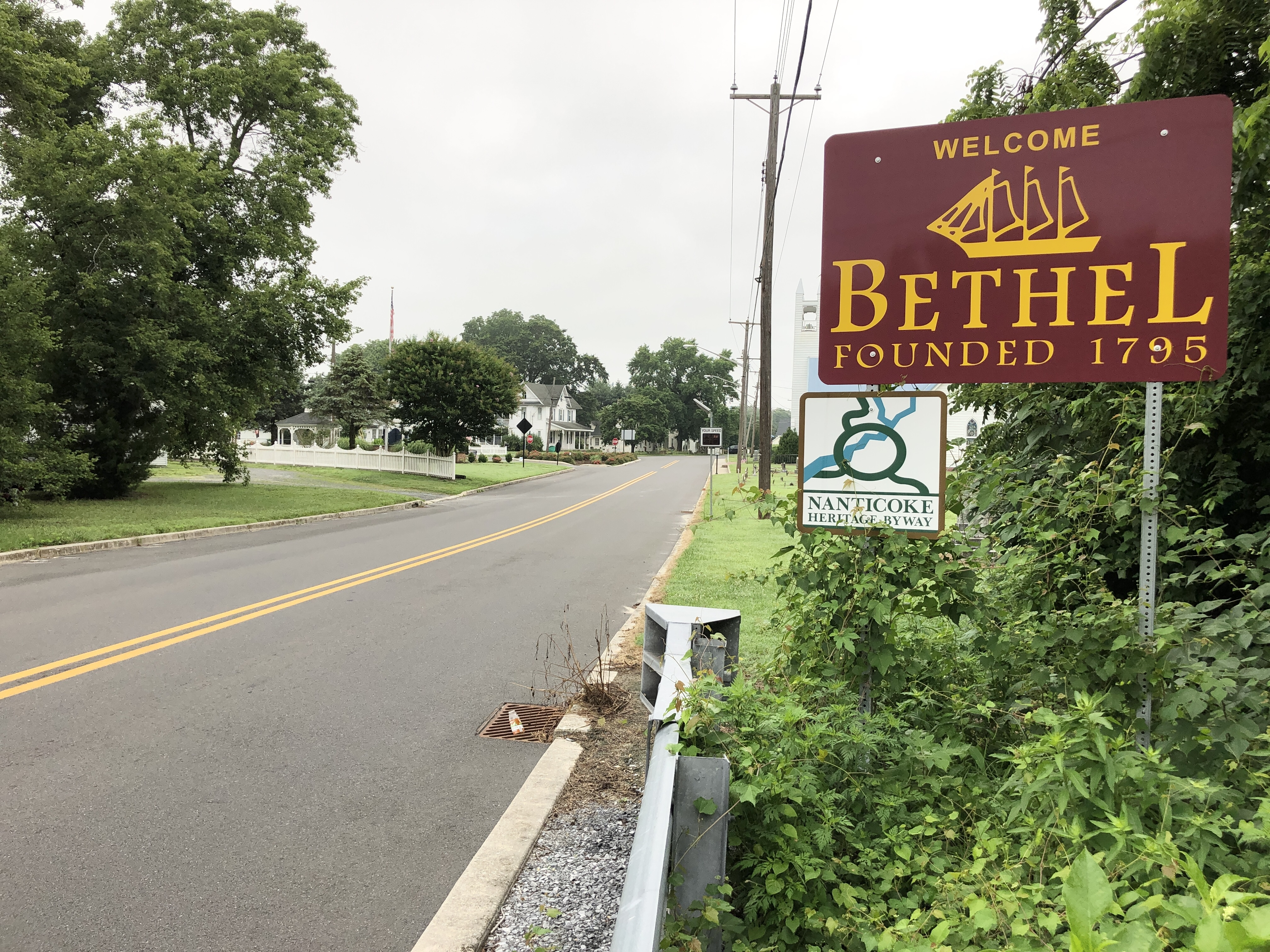
Shell Bridge Road northbound entering Bethel

The main modern transportation mode in Bethel is by road. However, no state highways serve the town directly. The closest state highway is Delaware Route 24, which is linked to Bethel by Shell Bridge Road.
