= Carlton Elliott =

American football player (1927–2005)

Carl Elliott
No. 44, 40, 80
- Positions: End, defensive end

Personal information
- Born: November 12, 1927; Laurel, Delaware, U.S.
- Died: July 18, 2005 (aged 77); Garland, Texas, U.S.
- Listed height: 6 ft 4 in (1.93 m)
- Listed weight: 230 lb (104 kg)

Career information
- High school: Laurel
- College: Virginia
- NFL draft: 1950: 13th round, 160th overall pick

Career history
- Erie Vets (1950); Green Bay Packers (1951–1954)

Career NFL statistics
- Receptions: 60
- Receiving yards: 581
- Receiving touchdowns: 6
- Stats at Pro Football Reference

Carlton Elliott (November 12, 1927 – July 18, 2005) was a defensive end in the National Football League (NFL).

== Biography ==
Elliott was born Carlton Batt Elliott Jr. on November 12, 1927, in Laurel, Delaware.

== Career ==
Elliott was drafted by the Green Bay Packers in the thirteenth round of the 1950 NFL draft and played four seasons with the team. He played at the collegiate level at the University of Virginia.

== Honors ==
He was inducted into the Delaware Sports Hall of Fame in 1988.
