= North Dakota State Board of Higher Education =

Policy body for the North Dakota University System

The North Dakota State Board of Higher Education (NDSBHE) is the policy-setting body for the North Dakota University System in the U.S. state of North Dakota. The eight-member board includes seven citizen members and one student member. The citizen members serve four-year terms and the student member serves a one-year term. All members are appointed by the Governor of North Dakota. The board also includes a non-voting faculty advisor that is selected by the Council of College Faculties, and a non-voting staff advisor that is selected by the North Dakota Staff Senate.

== Current members ==
- Casey Ryan, President
- Tim Mihalick, Vice President
- Danita Bye
- Jeffrey Volk
- John Warford
- Kevin Black
- Nick Hacker
- Sadie Hanson, Student Member
- Lisa Montplaisir, Faculty Advisor
- Michael Linnell, Staff Advisor
