= Potato house =

Structure for storage of harvested potatoes or sweet potatoes

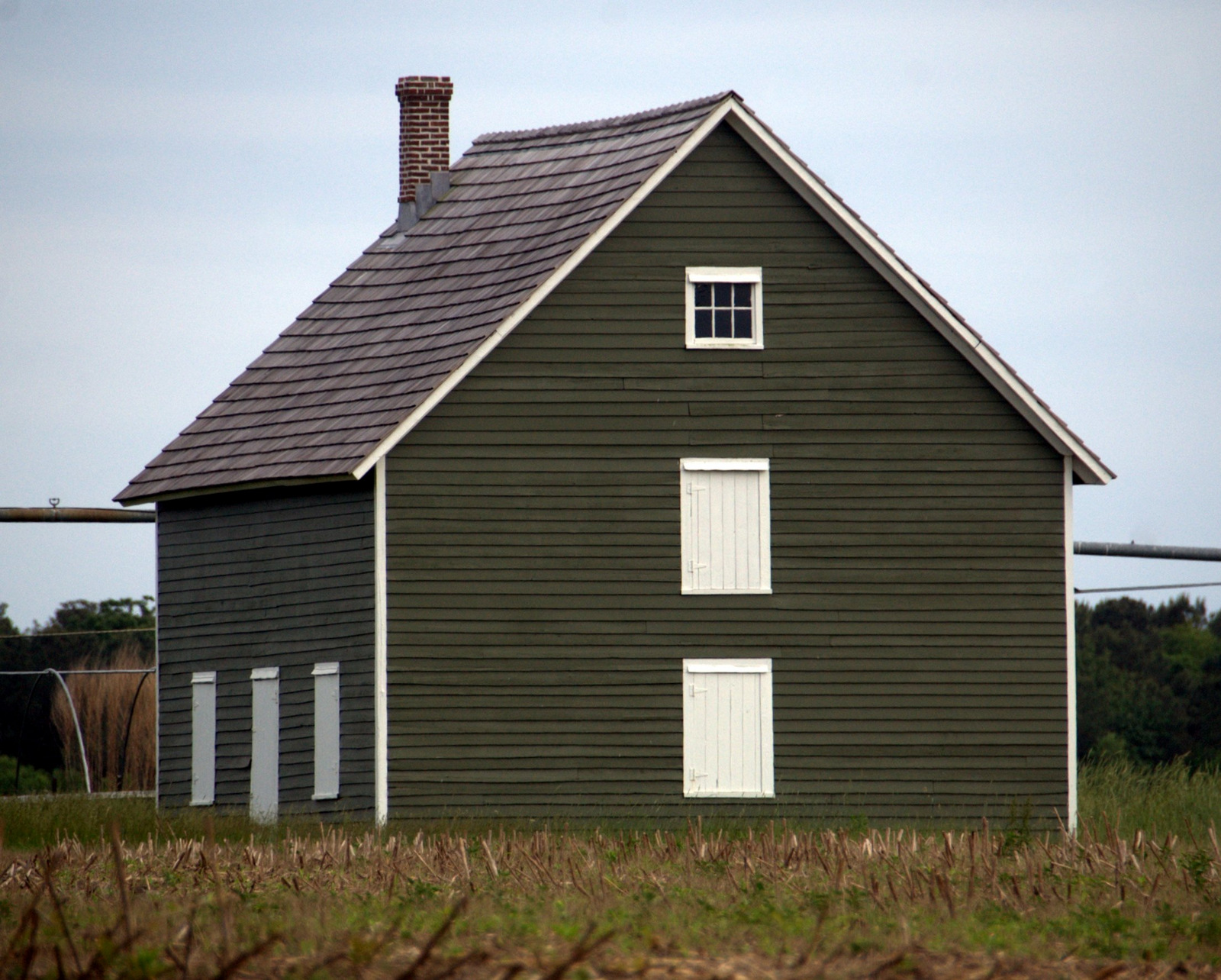

A potato house is a structure built for the storage of harvested potatoes or sweet potatoes. Such buildings were common in Sussex County, Delaware, and adjoining areas of Delaware, and Maryland in the early 20th century, when sweet potato production was at its local peak.

Similar structures were used in Maine to store potatoes.

== Delaware ==
The potato houses in Delaware were typically two-story wood-frame structures, of tall and narrow proportions, heated in winter with a coal or wood stove. Potatoes were stored from October through February, requiring a constant temperature of 50 degrees Fahrenheit. The potato houses were constructed to allow the free circulation of air among the stored crop, sometimes employing gaps between the bins and the exterior walls or at the floor level. The tall, narrow proportions of the houses encouraged circulation. Windows were typically provided at the top of the house to allow ventilation if temperatures rose too high. Multiple layers of siding, the use of red rosin paper for sealing against drafts, and sometimes the use of sawdust as insulation were other measures to safeguard the crop.

In general, potato houses were two stories tall, with gable roofs aligned with the long axis. The entrances were through the gable ends, with doors at the first and second floors in the front with an attic window for ventilation in the gables. Rear elevations usually featured a door at the first floor and windows at the second floor and gable. Side elevations were generally plain, with shuttered windows or doors. Openings fit tightly. While two-story elevations were typical, 1-1/2 to three-story houses existed.

Most potato houses have been demolished or have been converted to other uses. A number of surviving potato houses has been listed on the National Register of Historic Places.

== Maine ==
As the cultivation of potatoes expanded in the upper Saint John valley, harvested potatoes were stored in adapted barns, typically low Acadian barns, or in the basements of houses. More intense cultivation brought more draft animals, and changes to Maine barns and storage. Purpose-built potato barns were built into hillsides, ideally near a railroad for easy shipment.

== See also ==
- Functionally classified barn § Potato barns and houses
- Root cellar
