= National Register of Historic Places listings in Sussex County, Delaware =

The following properties are listed on the National Register of Historic Places in Sussex County, Delaware, United States.

This National Park Service list is complete through NPS recent listings posted May 15, 2026.

Contents: Counties and municipalities in Delaware
Newark (New Castle) | Wilmington (New Castle) | Northern New Castle | Southern New Castle | Kent | Sussex

	Name on the Register	Image	Date listed	Location	City or town	Description
1	Abbott's Mill	Abbott's Mill	August 25, 1972 (#72000300)	Southwest of Milford; 38°53′10″N 75°28′36″W	Milford vicinity	
2	Adams Home Farm	Adams Home Farm	November 23, 2015 (#14000532)	15293 Adams Rd. 38°46′26″N 75°36′33″W	Greenwood vicinity	
3	Joseph T. Adams House	Joseph T. Adams House	August 28, 1998 (#98001092)	12 E. Pine St. 38°41′29″N 75°23′03″W	Georgetown	
4	All Saints Episcopal Church	All Saints Episcopal Church	August 2, 1991 (#91000910)	18 Olive Ave. in Lewes and Rehoboth Hundred; 38°43′07″N 75°04′42″W	Rehoboth Beach	
5	Richard Allen School	Richard Allen School	June 20, 2019 (#100004083)	316 Railroad Ave. 38°41′25″N 75°22′35″W	Georgetown	
6	Avery's Rest Site		December 15, 1978 (#78000924)	Address restricted	Rehoboth Beach vicinity	
7	Ball Theatre	Ball Theatre	September 13, 2018 (#100002912)	214 Main St. 38°35′28″N 75°17′30″W	Millsboro	
8	Baltimore Mills Historic Archaeological Site		August 12, 1997 (#97000837)	Address restricted	Omar	
9	Barnes Woods Archeological District		December 11, 1996 (#96001413)	Address restricted	Seaford vicinity	
10	Bethel Historic District	Bethel Historic District	February 10, 1975 (#75000544)	0.4 miles west of Laurel; 38°34′38″N 75°37′55″W	Bethel	
11	Blackwater Presbyterian Church	Blackwater Presbyterian Church	July 9, 1976 (#76000583)	West of Clarksville on Delaware Route 54; 38°32′44″N 75°09′43″W	Clarksville	
12	Brick Hotel	Brick Hotel	November 13, 1979 (#79000644)	The Circle; 38°41′23″N 75°23′13″W	Georgetown	
13	Bridgeville Historic District	Bridgeville Historic District	April 14, 1994 (#94000361)	Roughly bounded by Market, Main and Edgewood Sts., School House Ln., Maple Alley and the Delmarva Central Railroad tracks 38°44′28″N 75°36′06″W	Bridgeville	
14	Bridgeville Public Library	Bridgeville Public Library	July 23, 1990 (#90001065)	210 Market St. 38°44′36″N 75°36′10″W	Bridgeville	
15	Building at 200–202A High Street	Building at 200–202A High Street	February 18, 1987 (#86002981)	200–202A High St. 38°38′26″N 75°36′47″W	Seaford	
16	Building at 218 High Street	Building at 218 High Street	February 18, 1987 (#86002983)	218 High St. 38°38′28″N 75°36′44″W	Seaford	
17	Building at High and Cannon Streets	Building at High and Cannon Streets	February 18, 1987 (#86002985)	Southeastern corner of High and Cannon Sts. 38°38′27″N 75°36′42″W	Seaford	
18	Burton-Blackstone-Carey Store	Burton-Blackstone-Carey Store	September 10, 2014 (#14000551)	103 State St. 38°35′31″N 75°17′29″W	Millsboro	
19	Burton Hardware Store	Burton Hardware Store	April 20, 1978 (#78000927)	High St. and Spring Alley; 38°38′29″N 75°36′39″W	Seaford	Destroyed in a 2012 fire.
20	Cannon's Ferry	Cannon's Ferry	July 2, 1973 (#73000561)	Across the Nanticoke River; 38°36′00″N 75°39′25″W	Woodland	
21	Cape Henlopen Archeological District		November 21, 1978 (#78000920)	Address restricted	Lewes vicinity	
22	Carey's Camp Meeting Ground	Carey's Camp Meeting Ground	March 14, 1973 (#73000557)	West of Millsboro off Delaware Route 24; 38°31′24″N 75°24′22″W	Millsboro vicinity	
23	Carlisle House	Carlisle House	April 22, 1982 (#82002364)	205 S. Front St. 38°54′45″N 75°25′32″W	Milford	
24	Capt. Ebe Chandler House	Capt. Ebe Chandler House	September 20, 1979 (#79000643)	Main and Reed Sts. 38°31′01″N 75°14′02″W	Frankford	
25	Chipman Potato House	Chipman Potato House	November 15, 1990 (#90001691)	Junction of Roads 465 and 465A; 38°33′37″N 75°32′14″W	Laurel vicinity	
26	Chipman's Mill	Chipman's Mill	May 22, 1978 (#78000918)	East of Laurel on Road 465; 38°33′42″N 75°32′24″W	Laurel vicinity	
27	Coleman House	Coleman House	April 11, 1977 (#77000392)	422 Kings Hwy. 38°46′12″N 75°08′31″W	Lewes	
28	Collins Potato House	Collins Potato House	November 15, 1990 (#90001692)	Junction of Roads 509 and 510A; 38°31′35″N 75°36′18″W	Laurel vicinity	
29	Cool Spring Presbyterian Church	Cool Spring Presbyterian Church	August 31, 1982 (#82002363)	West of Lewes on Road 247; 38°44′13″N 75°14′21″W	Lewes vicinity	
30	J. W. Cox Dry Goods Store	J. W. Cox Dry Goods Store	February 18, 1987 (#86002982)	214 High St. 38°38′27″N 75°36′44″W	Seaford	
31	Robert Davis Farmhouse		April 26, 1979 (#79003309)	South of Delaware Route 24; 38°36′30″N 75°12′13″W	Millsboro vicinity	Listed as destroyed or demolished
32	Dr. Dawson House	Dr. Dawson House	January 7, 1983 (#83001355)	200 SE. Front St. 38°54′43″N 75°25′34″W	Milford	The house has been replaced by a modern house
33	De Vries Palisade	De Vries Palisade	February 23, 1972 (#72000299)	Pilottown Road; 38°47′11″N 75°09′31″W	Lewes	
34	Deep Creek Furnace Site		October 20, 1977 (#77000396)	Address restricted	Middleford	
35	Delaware Boundary Markers	Delaware Boundary Markers	February 18, 1975 (#75002101)	Delaware state boundary lines with Maryland and Pennsylvania	Not applicable	
36	Delaware Breakwater and Lewes Harbor	Delaware Breakwater and Lewes Harbor	December 12, 1976 (#76000586)	East of Lewes at Cape Henlopen; 38°49′03″N 75°06′23″W	Lewes	
37	Dickerson Potato House	Dickerson Potato House	November 15, 1990 (#90001693)	Junction of Roads 494 and 498; 38°33′00″N 75°40′28″W	Delmar vicinity	
38	Dinker-Irvin House	Dinker-Irvin House	July 3, 2017 (#100001259)	310 Garfield Pkwy. Extended; 38°32′17″N 75°03′37″W	Bethany Beach	Now the Dinker-Irvin Cottage Museum
39	Dodd Homestead		August 26, 1982 (#82002367)	West of Rehoboth Beach on Delaware Route 1; 38°43′01″N 75°06′40″W	Rehoboth Beach vicinity	Listed as destroyed or demolished
40	Draper House	Draper House	April 22, 1982 (#82002365)	200 Lakeview Ave. 38°54′36″N 75°26′00″W	Milford	
41	Draper-Adkins House	Draper-Adkins House	April 11, 1973 (#73000558)	204 Federal St. 38°46′36″N 75°18′41″W	Milton	
42	Egglinton Hall	Egglinton Hall	January 7, 1983 (#83001359)	700 SE. 2nd St. 38°54′34″N 75°25′15″W	Milford	
43	Ellendale State Forest Picnic Facility	Ellendale State Forest Picnic Facility	July 22, 1991 (#91000913)	U.S. Route 113, ½ mile south of Delaware Route 16 in Georgetown Hundred; 38°46′32″N 75°26′15″W	Ellendale vicinity	
44	Eratt House	Eratt House	October 29, 1983 (#83001409)	West of Bridgeville on Road 572; 38°45′21″N 75°42′40″W	Bridgeville vicinity	
45	Evans-West House	Evans-West House	December 1, 2015 (#15000844)	40 West Ave. 38°32′48″N 75°05′17″W	Ocean View	
46	Peter S. Faucett House	Peter S. Faucett House	September 5, 1985 (#85002006)	W. Laurel St. 38°41′24″N 75°23′18″W	Georgetown	
47	Fenwick Island Lighthouse Station	Fenwick Island Lighthouse Station	August 13, 1979 (#79000642)	Off Delaware Route 54; 38°27′05″N 75°03′19″W	Fenwick Island vicinity	
48	First Broiler House	First Broiler House	July 3, 1974 (#74000607)	University of Delaware Experimental Station; 38°38′09″N 75°27′16″W	Georgetown vicinity	
49	First National Bank of Seaford	First National Bank of Seaford	February 18, 1987 (#86002972)	118 Pine St. 38°38′31″N 75°36′44″W	Seaford	
50	Fisher Homestead		December 11, 1980 (#80000941)	West of Lewes; 38°47′21″N 75°12′23″W	Lewes vicinity	
51	Fisher's Paradise	Fisher's Paradise	December 4, 1972 (#72000298)	624 Pilottown Rd. 38°47′01″N 75°09′26″W	Lewes	
52	Fort Miles Historic District	Fort Miles Historic District	September 30, 2004 (#04001076)	At the confluence of the Atlantic Ocean and Delaware Bay; 38°46′38″N 75°05′13″W	Lewes vicinity	
53	Georgetown Coal Gasification Plant		September 30, 1985 (#85002696)	N. Railroad Ave. 38°41′40″N 75°23′18″W	Georgetown	Listed as destroyed or demolished
54	Godwin School	Godwin School	July 16, 2018 (#100002658)	23235 Godwin School Rd. 38°36′02″N 75°20′48″W	Millsboro vicinity	
55	Grier House	Grier House	January 7, 1983 (#83001410)	301 Lakeview Ave. 38°54′32″N 75°26′05″W	Milford	
56	Stella Pepper Gyles House	Stella Pepper Gyles House	November 13, 1979 (#79000645)	Southwest of Georgetown at the Northwest corner of Delaware Roads 518 and 62; 38°39′43″N 75°24′23″W	Georgetown vicinity	
57	Col. David Hall House	Col. David Hall House	April 26, 1976 (#76000585)	107 King's Hwy. 38°46′25″N 75°08′20″W	Lewes	
58	Harmon School	Harmon School	April 26, 1979 (#79003314)	26673 John J. Williams Hwy; 38°36′51″N 75°12′08″W	Millsboro vicinity	
59	Isaac Harmon Farmhouse	Isaac Harmon Farmhouse	April 26, 1979 (#79003315)	Road 312A; 38°35′56″N 75°11′55″W	Millsboro vicinity	
60	Harmony Church	Harmony Church	April 26, 1979 (#79003308)	Delaware Route 24, east of Road 313; 38°36′21″N 75°13′08″W	Millsboro vicinity	
61	Hazzard House	Hazzard House	July 2, 1973 (#73000559)	327 Union St. 38°46′55″N 75°18′46″W	Milton	
62	Hearn and Rawlins Mill	Hearn and Rawlins Mill	May 22, 1978 (#78000928)	North of Seaford on Road 13; 38°40′44″N 75°35′39″W	Seaford vicinity	
63	Hearn Potato House	Hearn Potato House	November 15, 1990 (#90001694)	0.6 miles north of junction of Roads 62 and 74; 38°35′08″N 75°27′35″W	Laurel vicinity	
64	Hebron Methodist Protestant Church and Cemetery	Hebron Methodist Protestant Church and Cemetery	May 18, 2015 (#15000220)	18282 Seashore Hwy. 38°41′53″N 75°25′43″W	Georgetown vicinity	
65	Highball Signal	Highball Signal	July 2, 1973 (#73000553)	City park, near Delmarva Central Railroad line. 38°27′23″N 75°34′44″W	Delmar	
66	E. L. Hitch Potato House		November 15, 1990 (#90001695)	Junction of Roads 480 and 489; 38°36′11″N 75°33′48″W	Laurel vicinity	
67	Ames Hitchens Chicken Farm		April 26, 1979 (#79003311)	North of Delaware Route 24; 38°36′25″N 75°13′06″W	Millsboro vicinity	Listed as destroyed or demolished
68	Hopkins' Covered Bridge Farm	Hopkins' Covered Bridge Farm	August 2, 1991 (#91000912)	Northern side of Road 262 east of its junction with Road 286 in Lewes and Rehoboth Hundred; 38°43′10″N 75°13′14″W	Lewes vicinity	
69	Indian Mission Church	Indian Mission Church	April 26, 1979 (#79003307)	Junction of Delaware Route 5 and Road 48; 38°40′25″N 75°14′05″W	Millsboro vicinity	
70	Indian Mission School	Indian Mission School	April 26, 1979 (#79003312)	27073 John J. Williams Hwy. 38°36′22″N 75°12′42″W	Millsboro vicinity	
71	Indian River Archeological Complex		December 15, 1978 (#78000922)	Address restricted	Millsboro vicinity	
72	Indian River Life Saving Service Station	Indian River Life Saving Service Station	September 29, 1976 (#76000582)	North of Bethany Beach on Delaware Route 1; 38°38′01″N 75°04′03″W	Bethany Beach vicinity	
73	Isaacs & Sons Cold Storage Building		January 6, 2025 (#100011239)	107 Depot Street; 38°41′36″N 75°23′11″W	Georgetown	
74	Johnson School	Johnson School	April 26, 1979 (#79003313)	Delaware Route 24 between Roads 309 and 310; 38°36′13″N 75°13′50″W	Millsboro vicinity	
75	Judge's House and Law Office	Judge's House and Law Office	November 13, 1979 (#79000646)	100 and 104 W. Market St. 38°41′21″N 75°23′17″W	Georgetown	
76	Laurel Historic District	Laurel Historic District	July 27, 1988 (#88001056)	West St. to Rossakatum Creek to 10th St. 38°33′22″N 75°34′17″W	Laurel	
77	Lawrence		May 22, 1978 (#78000929)	U.S. Route 13A; 38°39′43″N 75°36′04″W	Seaford	Listed as destroyed or demolished
78	Lewes Historic District	Lewes Historic District	September 19, 1977 (#77000393)	Ship-carpenter, Front, Savannah, 2nd, 3rd, and 4th Sts. 38°46′29″N 75°08′34″W	Lewes	
79	Lewes Presbyterian Church	Lewes Presbyterian Church	October 5, 1977 (#77000394)	100 Kings Highway; 38°46′20″N 75°08′23″W	Lewes	
80	Lightship WAL 539	Lightship WAL 539	February 16, 1989 (#89000006)	Lewes-Rehoboth Canal between Shipcarpenter and Mulberry Sts. 38°46′42″N 75°08′30″W	Lewes	Unique lightship was one of few that remained in service during World War II
81	Peter Marsh House	Peter Marsh House	November 23, 1977 (#77000397)	10 Dodd's Lane; 38°43′30″N 75°05′11″W	Henlopen Acres	
82	Maston House	Maston House	March 31, 1975 (#75000545)	3 miles north of Seaford on Seaford-Atlanta Rd. 38°41′20″N 75°38′58″W	Seaford vicinity	
83	Thomas Maull House	Thomas Maull House	November 20, 1970 (#70000175)	542 Pilottown Rd. 38°46′49″N 75°09′04″W	Lewes	Boundaries increased on April 26, 1978 at the same address.
84	McColley's Chapel	McColley's Chapel	November 30, 2011 (#11000859)	18168 Redden Rd. 38°44′34″N 75°25′56″W	Georgetown vicinity	
85	Melson House	Melson House	March 8, 1978 (#78000914)	North of Atlanta on Road 30; 38°43′26″N 75°40′55″W	Atlanta	
86	Dr. John W. Messick House and Office	Dr. John W. Messick House and Office	September 9, 1987 (#87001499)	144 E. Market St. 38°41′58″N 75°23′02″W	Georgetown	
87	Milford Railroad Station	Milford Railroad Station	January 7, 1983 (#83001356)	Delaware Route 36; 38°54′38″N 75°25′57″W	Milford	
88	Milford Shipyard Area Historic District	Milford Shipyard Area Historic District	January 7, 1983 (#83001411)	Roughly bounded by Mispillion River, Franklin, Front and Marshall Sts. 38°54′46″N 75°25′24″W	Milford	
89	Milton Historic District	Milton Historic District	June 25, 1982 (#82002366)	Delaware Route 5; 38°46′35″N 75°18′35″W	Milton	Boundary increase approved July 21, 2022
90	Mispillion Lighthouse and Beacon Tower	Mispillion Lighthouse and Beacon Tower	February 18, 1987 (#86002919)	Northeastern end of Road 203; 38°56′50″N 75°18′56″W	Milford vicinity	
91	Moore Potato House		November 15, 1990 (#90001696)	Southeast of junction of Roads 72 and 463; 38°31′15″N 75°30′01″W	Laurel vicinity	
92	National Harbor of Refuge and Delaware Breakwater Harbor Historic District	National Harbor of Refuge and Delaware Breakwater Harbor Historic District	March 27, 1989 (#89000289)	Mouth of Delaware Bay at Cape Henlopen; 38°47′59″N 75°06′27″W	Lewes	
93	Norwood House	Norwood House	October 25, 1982 (#82001030)	Southwest of Lewes on U.S. Route 9; 38°44′47″N 75°10′48″W	Belltown	
94	Old Bridgeville Fire House	Old Bridgeville Fire House	August 9, 1984 (#84000856)	102 William St. 38°44′34″N 75°36′04″W	Bridgeville	
95	Old Christ Church	Old Christ Church	April 13, 1972 (#72000297)	Southeast of Laurel at junction of Roads 465 and 465A; 38°33′40″N 75°32′16″W	Laurel vicinity	
96	Old Sussex County Courthouse	Old Sussex County Courthouse	March 24, 1971 (#71000236)	S. Bedford St. 38°41′23″N 75°23′08″W	Georgetown	
97	Pagan Creek Dike	Pagan Creek Dike	June 18, 1973 (#73000555)	Pagan Creek near New Rd. 38°46′16″N 75°09′53″W	Lewes	
98	David Carlton Pepper Farm	David Carlton Pepper Farm	September 24, 1979 (#79000647)	South of Georgetown on Road 469; 38°39′47″N 75°23′33″W	Georgetown vicinity	
99	Perry-Shockley House		September 5, 1985 (#85002008)	219 Washington St. 38°35′15″N 75°17′41″W	Millsboro	
100	Phillips Potato House	Phillips Potato House	November 15, 1990 (#90001697)	Southwest of junction of Roads 492 and 492A; 38°33′20″N 75°36′59″W	Laurel vicinity	
101	Pine Grove Furnace Site		January 26, 1978 (#78000917)	Address restricted	Concord	
102	Gov. James Ponder House	Gov. James Ponder House	May 24, 1973 (#73000560)	416 Federal St. 38°46′26″N 75°18′49″W	Milton	
103	Poplar Thicket	Poplar Thicket	December 29, 1978 (#78003177)	west of the Indian River inlet on Long Neck; 38°37′13″N 75°08′14″W	Long Neck	
104	Portsville Lighthouse		September 8, 1987 (#87001514)	Northern side of Road 493; 38°33′43″N 75°37′48″W	Portsville	
105	Prince George's Chapel	Prince George's Chapel	March 24, 1971 (#71000235)	Dagsboro on Delaware Route 26; 38°32′54″N 75°14′22″W	Dagsboro	
106	Prospect A.M.E. Church		October 23, 2023 (#100009498)	220 South Railroad Ave. 38°41′28″N 75°22′49″W	Georgetown	
107	Ralph Potato House		November 15, 1990 (#90001698)	Southeast of junction of Roads 493 and 494; 38°32′15″N 75°38′19″W	Laurel vicinity	
108	Redden Forest Lodge, Forester's House, and Stable	Redden Forest Lodge, Forester's House, and Stable	November 25, 1980 (#80000940)	Redden State Forest; 38°44′29″N 75°24′43″W	Georgetown vicinity	
109	Ricards House-Linden Hall		August 26, 1982 (#82002360)	East of Bridgeville on U.S. Route 13; 38°46′15″N 75°35′35″W	Bridgeville vicinity	Demolished
110	Richards Historic District	Richards Historic District	December 15, 1983 (#83003522)	Road 34; 38°47′15″N 75°38′26″W	Greenwood vicinity	
111	Richards Mansion	Richards Mansion	July 26, 1979 (#79000648)	N. Bedford St. and the Circle; 38°41′26″N 75°23′13″W	Georgetown	
112	Rider Potato House	Rider Potato House	November 15, 1990 (#90001699)	Southeast of junction of Roads 505 and 506; 38°33′37″N 75°32′14″W	Laurel vicinity	
113	David Robbins Homestead	David Robbins Homestead	January 2, 2013 (#11000878)	26285 Broadkill Rd. 38°47′40″N 75°17′22″W	Milton vicinity	
114	Jesse Robinson House	Jesse Robinson House	August 26, 1982 (#82002368)	High St. 38°38′31″N 75°36′31″W	Seaford	
115	Roosevelt Inlet Shipwreck		November 16, 2006 (#06001056)	In Delaware Bay near Roosevelt Inlet; Address Restricted	Lewes	18th century commercial shipwreck
116	Ross Point School	Ross Point School	August 17, 2001 (#01000886)	Road 448 near junction with Road 62; 38°33′23″N 75°27′15″W	Laurel vicinity	Listed as destroyed or demolished
117	Edgar and Rachel Ross House	Edgar and Rachel Ross House	September 11, 1997 (#97001118)	413 High St. 38°38′36″N 75°36′36″W	Seaford	
118	Gov. William H. Ross House	Gov. William H. Ross House	October 28, 1977 (#77000399)	23669 Ross Station Rd. 38°39′18″N 75°37′05″W	Seaford	
119	William Russell House	William Russell House	April 18, 1977 (#77000395)	410 Pilot Town Rd. 38°46′46″N 75°09′03″W	Lewes	
120	St. George's Chapel, Lewes	St. George's Chapel, Lewes	November 30, 1973 (#73000556)	9 miles southwest of Lewes on Delaware Route 5; 38°41′08″N 75°13′09″W	Lewes vicinity	
121	St. John's Methodist Church	St. John's Methodist Church	July 12, 1990 (#90001071)	Springfield Crossroads, junction of Delaware Route 30 and Road 47; 38°40′54″N 75°18′28″W	Georgetown vicinity	
122	St. Luke's Protestant Episcopal Church	St. Luke's Protestant Episcopal Church	October 28, 1977 (#77000400)	Front St. 38°38′37″N 75°36′33″W	Seaford	
123	St. Paul's Episcopal Church	St. Paul's Episcopal Church	November 13, 1979 (#79000649)	E. Pine St; 38°41′26″N 75°22′58″W	Georgetown	
124	Scott's Store	Scott's Store	October 29, 1983 (#83001412)	Northwest of Bridgeville on Delaware Route 404; 38°46′49″N 75°40′04″W	Bridgeville vicinity	
125	Seaford Station Complex	Seaford Station Complex	June 15, 1978 (#78000930)	Nanticoke River at Delaware Railroad Bridge; 38°38′18″N 75°36′53″W	Seaford	
126	Short Homestead	Short Homestead	April 1, 1982 (#82002361)	West of Georgetown at Roads 526 and 529; 38°40′54″N 75°30′04″W	Georgetown vicinity	
127	Thomas Sipple House	Thomas Sipple House	September 5, 1985 (#85002007)	N. Bedford & New Sts. 38°41′34″N 75°23′22″W	Georgetown	
128	South Milford Historic District	South Milford Historic District	January 7, 1983 (#83001358)	Roughly bounded by Mispillion River, Maple Ave., Church and Washington Sts. 38°54′37″N 75°25′42″W	Milford	
129	Spring Banke	Spring Banke	April 30, 1976 (#76000584)	Northeast of Clarksville on Delaware Route 26 and Irons Lane; 38°33′09″N 75°08′24″W	Clarksville	
130	Spring Garden	Spring Garden	August 26, 1982 (#82002362)	Northeast of Laurel on Delaware Ave. 38°33′52″N 75°34′02″W	Laurel	
131	Stanley Potato House	Stanley Potato House	November 15, 1990 (#90001700)	North of junction of Roads 68 and 451; 38°31′04″N 75°32′35″W	Laurel vicinity	
132	Sudler House	Sudler House	December 31, 1974 (#74000606)	N. Main St. 38°44′50″N 75°35′58″W	Bridgeville	
133	Sussex County Courthouse and the Circle	Sussex County Courthouse and the Circle	June 4, 1973 (#73000554)	The Circle; 38°41′32″N 75°23′05″W	Georgetown	
134	Sussex National Bank of Seaford	Sussex National Bank of Seaford	February 18, 1987 (#86002977)	130 High St. 38°38′26″N 75°36′49″W	Seaford	
135	Teddy's Tavern	Teddy's Tavern	July 22, 1991 (#91000911)	Eastern side of U.S. Route 113 (Du Pont Boulevard), 0.6 miles north of its junction with Delaware Route 16 in Cedar Creek Hundred; 38°48′53″N 75°26′19″W	Ellendale vicinity	
136	Thompson's Loss and Gain Site		September 13, 1978 (#78000925)	Address restricted	Rehoboth Beach vicinity	
137	Thompsons Island Site		November 15, 1978 (#78000926)	Address restricted	Rehoboth Beach vicinity	
138	Townsend Site		September 1, 1978 (#78000919)	Address restricted	Lewes	
139	Trinity Methodist Episcopal Church	Trinity Methodist Episcopal Church	May 5, 1978 (#78000916)	Northwest of Bridgeville on Road 31; 38°45′13″N 75°40′41″W	Bridgeville vicinity	
140	Tunnell-West House	Tunnell-West House	July 3, 2012 (#12000379)	39 Central Ave. 38°32′53″N 75°05′22″W	Ocean View	
141	Union Wesley Methodist Episcopal Church Complex	Union Wesley Methodist Episcopal Church Complex	September 17, 2014 (#14000617)	Powell Farm Rd. 38°32′42″N 75°08′49″W	Clarksville	
142	Warren's Mill	Warren's Mill	September 13, 1978 (#78000923)	Northwest of Millsboro on Road 326; 38°35′45″N 75°18′14″W	Millsboro vicinity	
143	Warrington Site		October 20, 1977 (#77000398)	Address restricted	Rehoboth Beach vicinity	
144	West Potato House		November 15, 1990 (#90001701)	U.S. Route 13 north of its junction with Road 454A; 38°28′48″N 75°34′18″W	Delmar vicinity	Listed as destroyed or demolished
145	West Woods Methodist Episcopal Church	West Woods Methodist Episcopal Church	July 20, 2007 (#07000246)	West Woods Rd., west of Millsboro Hwy. 38°30′29″N 75°22′12″W	Gumboro	
146	Wilgus Site		March 30, 1978 (#78000915)	Address restricted	Bethany Beach vicinity	
147	Wolfe's Neck Site		November 21, 1978 (#78000921)	Address restricted	Lewes vicinity	
148	Woman's Christian Temperance Union Fountain	Woman's Christian Temperance Union Fountain	February 28, 2009 (#09000052)	Boardwalk at Rehoboth Avenue; 38°43′00″N 75°04′34″W	Rehoboth Beach	
149	Wright Potato House		November 15, 1990 (#90001702)	Southwest of junction of Delaware Route 24 and Road 510; 38°31′57″N 75°36′35″W	Laurel vicinity	Listed as destroyed or demolished
150	Gardiner Wright Mansion	Gardiner Wright Mansion	November 15, 1979 (#79000650)	228 S. Front St; 38°41′07″N 75°23′00″W	Georgetown	
151	Warren T. Wright Farmhouse Site		April 26, 1979 (#79003310)	Address restricted	Millsboro vicinity	

== Former listing ==
	Name on the Register	Image	Date listed	Date removed	Location	City or town	Description
1	Fisher House (White Meadow Farm)	Fisher House (White Meadow Farm)	March 24, 1971 (#71000234)	April 9, 1981	120 King's Highway; 38°46′25″N 75°08′21″W	Lewes	Now located on King's Highway in Zwaanendael Park in Lewes as the Lewes Chamber of Commerce Building.
