= Norwood House =

Norwood House is the name of:

- Norwood House, Beverley in the East Riding of Yorkshire, England
- Norwood House (Lewes, Delaware) in the United States
