= St George's Chapel (disambiguation) =

St George's Chapel, Windsor Castle is the place of worship at Windsor Castle in England.

St George's Chapel may also refer to:

- St George's Chapel, Chatham, Medway, England
- St. George's Chapel, Indian River, Delaware, USA
- St. George's Chapel, Lewes, Delaware, USA
- St George's Interdenominational Chapel, Heathrow Airport, Greater London, England
