= Union Wesley Methodist Episcopal Church Complex =

Historic church in Delaware, United States

- U.S. National Register of Historic Places
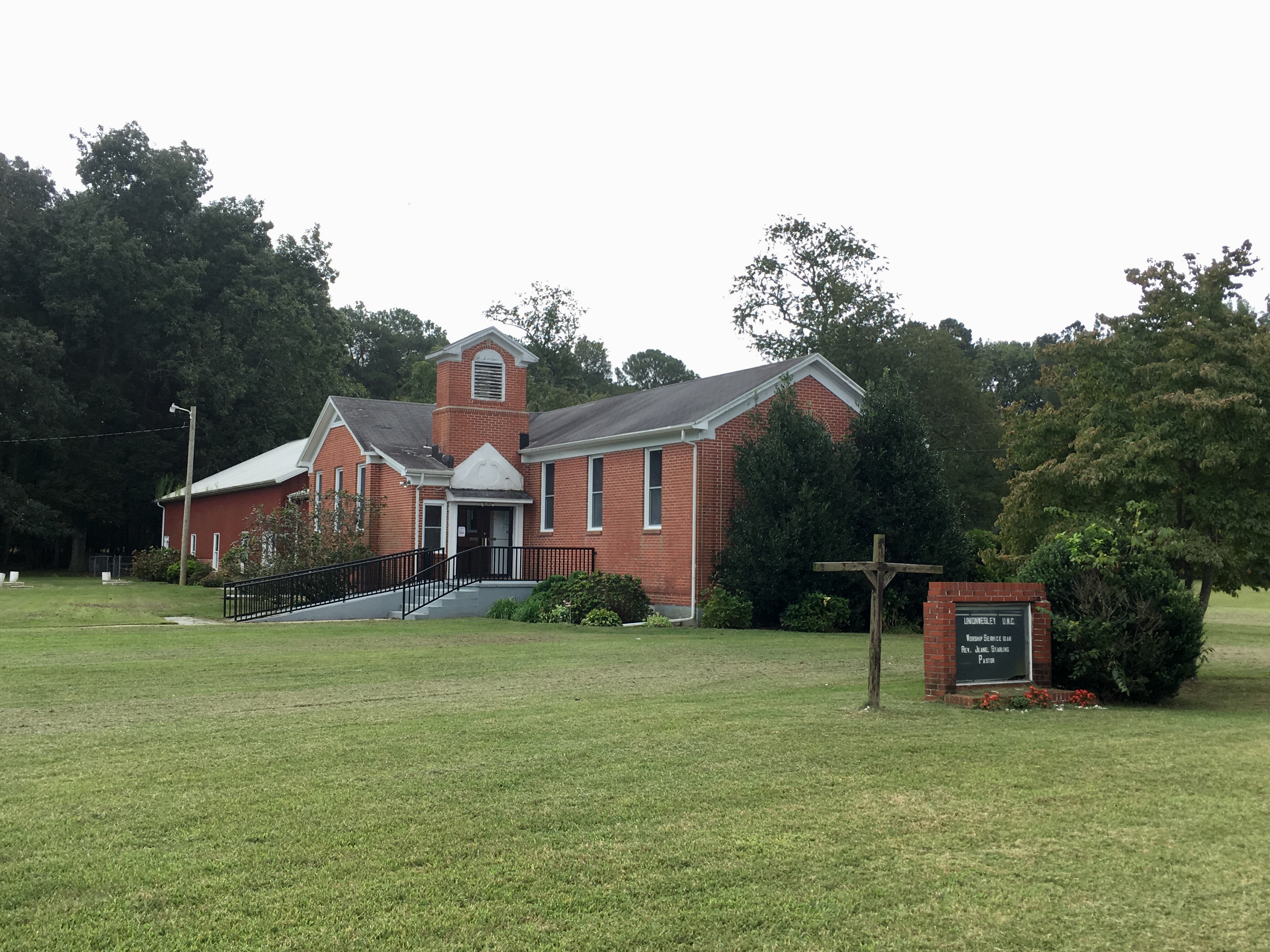

- Location within Delaware Location within the United States
- Location: Powell Farm Road, near Clarksville, Delaware
- Coordinates: 38°32′42″N 75°8′49″W
- Built: c. 1873, 1890, 1959
- NRHP reference No.: 14000617
- Added to NRHP: September 17, 2014

The Union Wesley Methodist Episcopal Church Complex is a historic church and summer camp meeting facility on Powell Farm Road near Clarksville, Delaware. The property was developed in the post-Civil War era as a summer religious camp for African Americans. It was established around 1873, with an open tabernacle structure for religious functions, surrounded by modest cottages. An 1890 one-room schoolhouse that was used in the education of African-American children was adapted as the camp's refectory in 1922, and in 1959 the Union Wesley Methodist Episcopal Church was built on the property. The school building in particular is notable as one of the best-preserved late 19th-century schools for African-Americans in the state.

The complex was listed on the National Register of Historic Places in 2014.

== See also ==
- National Register of Historic Places listings in Sussex County, Delaware
