= Deep Creek Furnace Site =

Archaeological site in Delaware, United States

- U.S. National Register of Historic Places
- Nearest city: Middleford, Delaware
- Area: 15 acres (6.1 ha)
- NRHP reference No.: 77000396
- Added to NRHP: October 20, 1977

The Deep Creek Furnace Site is a historic colonial industrial site in rural Sussex County, Delaware, near the community of Middleford. The Deep Creek Furnace is one of the two oldest blast furnaces (along with Pine Grove) established in what is now southern Delaware for processing bog iron into wrought iron. It was established by Jonathan Vaughn, who came from Pennsylvania and began acquiring land for it c. 1763. The main furnace was located at the head of Deep Creek, and a forge for processing its pig iron was set up 4 miles (6.4 km) away at present-day Middleford. Vaughn apparently operated the facilities until the outbreak of the American Revolutionary War, in which he served in the Continental Army.

The site was listed on the National Register of Historic Places in 1977.

== See also ==
- National Register of Historic Places listings in Sussex County, Delaware
