= Baltimore Mills Historic Archaeological Site =

Archaeological site in Delaware, United States

- U.S. National Register of Historic Places
- Location: 31442 Peach Tree Lane, Frankford, Delaware
- Area: 5 acres (2.0 ha)
- Built: 1795
- NRHP reference No.: 97000837
- Added to NRHP: August 12, 1997

The Baltimore Mills Historic Archaeological Site is a historic industrial mill site in Sussex County, Delaware. It consists of an 18th-century mill complex that included water-powered gristmills and sawmills. The area is now an orchard.

The site was listed on the National Register of Historic Places in 1997.
