= Burton–Blackstone–Carey Store =

- U.S. National Register of Historic Places
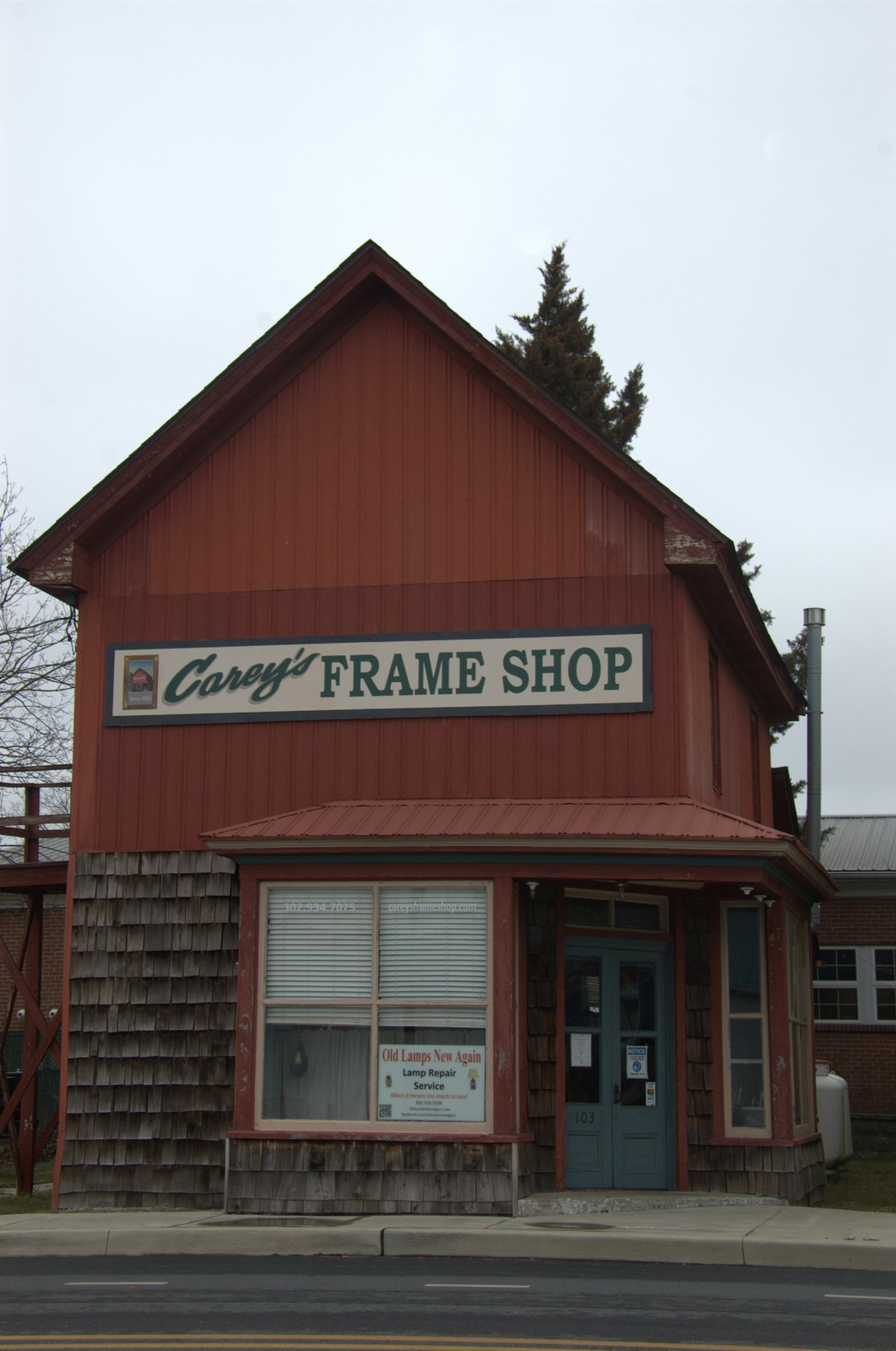

- Location within Delaware Location within the United States
- Location: 103 State St. Millsboro, Delaware
- Coordinates: 38°35′31″N 75°17′29″W
- Built: c. 1840
- NRHP reference No.: 14000551
- Added to NRHP: September 10, 2014

The Burton–Blackstone–Carey Store is a historic commercial building at 103 State Street in Millsboro, Delaware. It is a 2 1/2-story wood-frame structure with vernacular Greek Revival styling. Built c. 1840, it is Millsboro's oldest surviving commercial building. Originally located at the corner of Main and State Streets, it was moved a short distance down State Street in 1918 to make way for the construction of the (now adjacent) Delaware Trust building. The Burton–Blackstone–Carey Store has retained much original fabric, including original siding material, most of which is now preserved under more recent metal siding.

The building was listed on the National Register of Historic Places in 2014.

== See also ==
- National Register of Historic Places listings in Sussex County, Delaware
