= Pine Grove Furnace Site =

Archaeological site in Delaware, United States

- U.S. National Register of Historic Places
- Nearest city: Concord, Delaware
- Area: 5 acres (2.0 ha)
- NRHP reference No.: 78000917
- Added to NRHP: January 26, 1978

The Pine Grove Furnace Site is a historic colonial industrial site in rural Sussex County, Delaware. Pine Grove was one of the first blast furnaces to be set up in what is now southern Delaware (along with Deep Creek). The endeavor was begun Thomas Lightfoot and Abraham Mitchel, who apparently had the furnace built by late 1765. The exact fate of the works is unclear; it is last mentioned in the documentary record in 1773, and its operations may have been curtailed by the outbreak of the American Revolutionary War a few years later. The site, which included a dam, was located about 2 miles (3.2 km) above the confluence of Deep Creek with the Nanticoke River.

The site was listed on the National Register of Historic Places in 1978.

== See also ==
- National Register of Historic Places listings in Sussex County, Delaware
