= Hebron Methodist Protestant Church and Cemetery =

Historic site in Sussex County, Delaware, US

- U.S. National Register of Historic Places
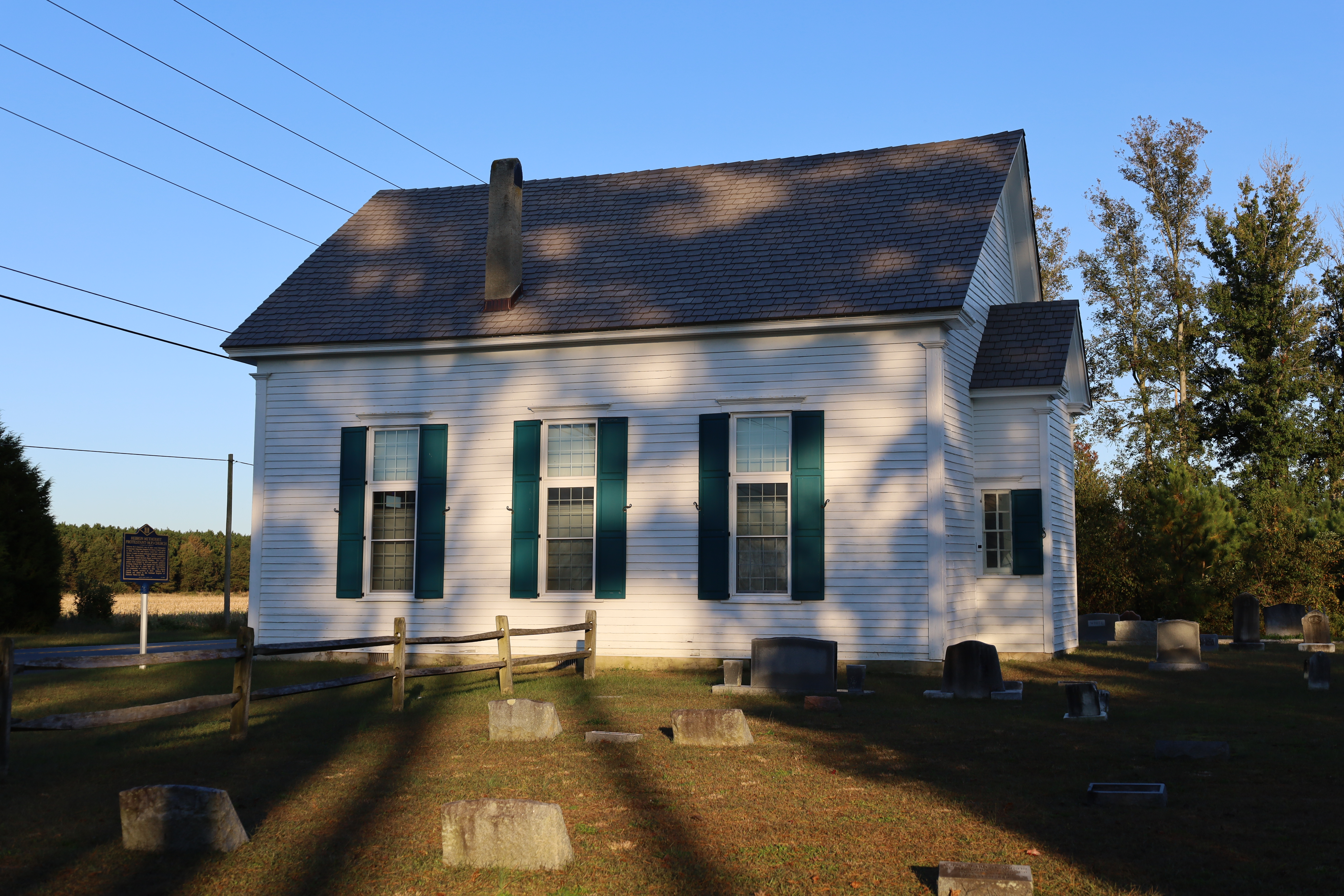

- Location within Delaware Location within the United States
- Location: 18282 Seashore Hwy., near Georgetown, Delaware
- Coordinates: 38°41′53″N 75°25′43″W
- Built: 1888
- Architectural style: Vernacular Greek Revival
- NRHP reference No.: 15000220
- Added to NRHP: May 18, 2015

The Hebron Methodist Protestant Church and Cemetery is a historic church property at 18282 Seashore Highway near Georgetown, Delaware. The church is a single-story wood-frame structure, with a gable roof and clapboard siding, built in 1888 for a Methodist congregation. It is architecturally distinguished for its interior, which is, unlike most period Delaware church, has walls finished in wood paneling instead of plaster. Regular services at the church ended in 1934.

The property was added to the National Register of Historic Places in 2015.

== See also ==
- National Register of Historic Places listings in Sussex County, Delaware
