= David Robbins Homestead =

Historic house in Delaware, United States

- U.S. National Register of Historic Places
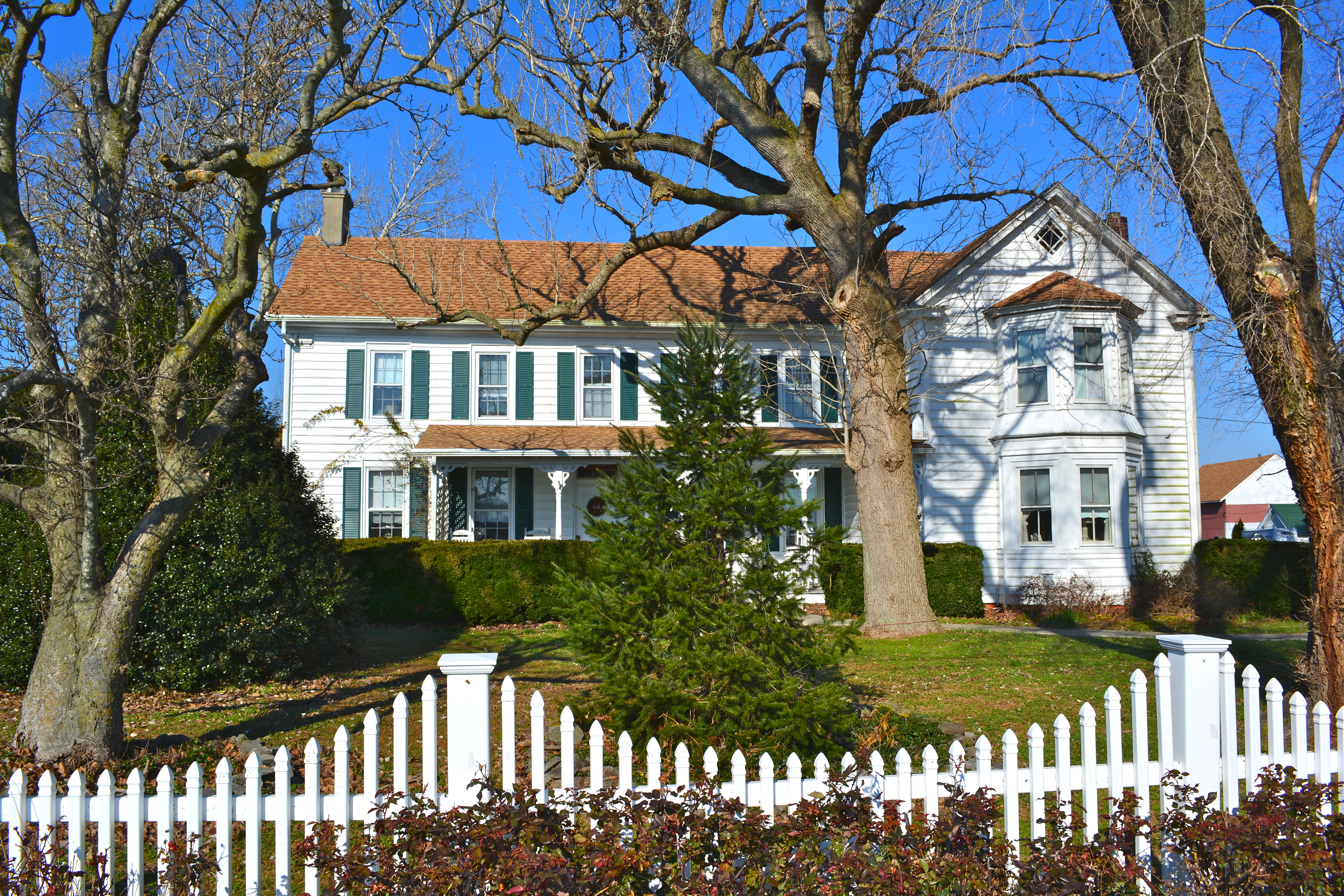

- Location within Delaware Location within the United States
- Location: 26285 Broadkill Road, Milton, Delaware
- Coordinates: 38°47′40″N 75°17′22″W
- Built: c. 1850
- Architectural style: Vernacular
- NRHP reference No.: 11000878
- Added to NRHP: January 2, 2013

The David Robbins House is a historic house at 26285 Broadkill Road near Milton in Sussex County, Delaware. The two story vernacular wood-frame house was built c. 1850, and is one of a few from the period to survive in the area. The house was bought in 1925 by Charles G. Jones, an innovator in Delaware's holly industry.

The house was listed on the National Register of Historic Places in 2013.

== See also ==
- National Register of Historic Places listings in Sussex County, Delaware
