= Melson House =

Historic house in Delaware, United States

- U.S. National Register of Historic Places
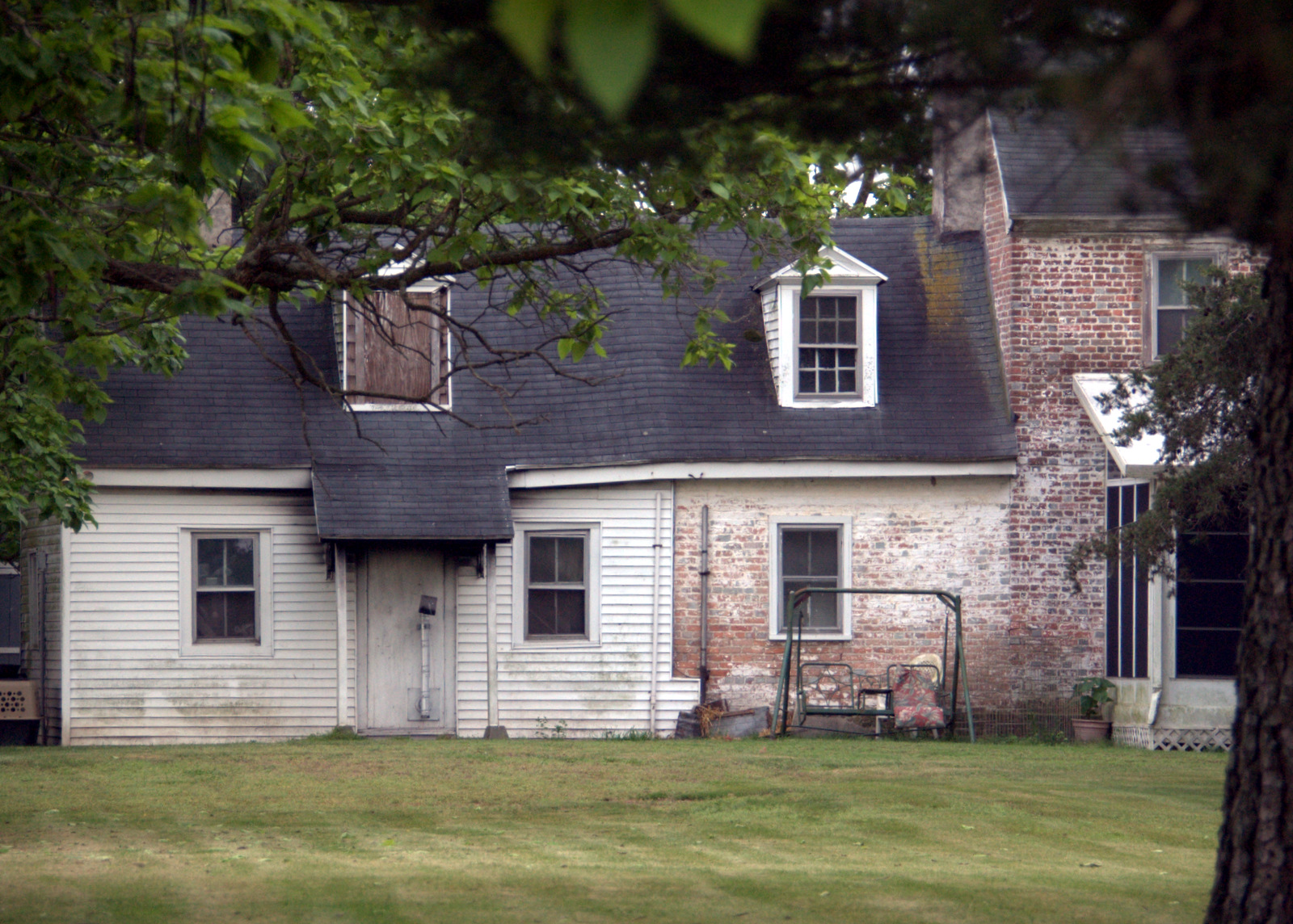

- Location within Delaware Location within the United States
- Location: North of Atlanta on Road 30, near Atlanta, Delaware
- Coordinates: 38°43′26″N 75°40′55″W
- Area: 2 acres (0.81 ha)
- NRHP reference No.: 78000914
- Added to NRHP: March 8, 1978

Melson House, also known as the Brown Residence and Curtis Jacobs House, is a historic home located near Atlanta, Sussex County, Delaware. It was built in the 18th century, and is a two-story, three-bay, brick dwelling. It has a gable roof and two one-story wings, one brick and the other frame. It features a frame porch across most of the first-floor front and gable end chimneys.

It was added to the National Register of Historic Places in 1978.

== See also ==
- National Register of Historic Places listings in Sussex County, Delaware
