= Indian River Archeological Complex =

Archaeological site in Delaware, United States

- U.S. National Register of Historic Places
- U.S. Historic district
- Nearest city: Millsboro, Delaware
- Area: 19.4 acres (7.9 ha)
- NRHP reference No.: 78000922
- Added to NRHP: December 15, 1978

The Indian River Archeological Complex is a collection of archaeological sites near Millsboro, Delaware, encompassing what is the only known riverine settlement in Sussex County during the Middle Woodland Period (c. 500BCE to 1000CE). It consists of three separate sites, 7S-F-11, 7S-F-12, and 7S-F-13. These sites appear to have been semi-permanent seasonal settlements, occupied during the spring and fall, and abandoned for other hunting and fishing grounds in the summer and winter. Finds at each site include both worked stone artifacts including projectile points, as well as different types of ceramics. The combination of finds raises questions about the pattern of cultural migration in the area, which further investigation of the sites may shed light on. Of the three sites, two have been subjected to surface-level collection, and one, 7S-F-13, has been subjected to more intensive excavations.

The sites were listed on the National Register of Historic Places in 1978.

== See also ==
- National Register of Historic Places listings in Sussex County, Delaware
