= Thompson's Loss and Gain Site =

Archaeological site in Delaware, United States

- U.S. National Register of Historic Places
- Nearest city: Rehoboth Beach, Delaware
- Area: 1 acre (0.40 ha)
- NRHP reference No.: 78000925
- Added to NRHP: September 13, 1978

The Thompson's Loss and Gain Site is a colonial-era historic site near Rehoboth Beach in Sussex County, Delaware. It is an archaeological site encompassing a tenant farm that was in active use from about 1720 to 1780. The site includes the site of a house, root cellar, and well. It was listed on the National Register of Historic Places in 1978.

== See also ==
- National Register of Historic Places listings in Sussex County, Delaware
