= Townsend Site =

Archaeological site in Delaware, United States

- U.S. National Register of Historic Places
- Nearest city: Lewes, Delaware
- Area: 28 acres (11 ha)
- NRHP reference No.: 78000919
- Added to NRHP: September 1, 1978

The Townsend Site is a major prehistoric Native American site in Sussex County, Delaware. The Late Woodland site includes at least 90 significant features, including numerous burial sites. The site received its first thorough study in 1948, and was the first Late Woodland site in the state to be examined in consultation with professional archaeologists of the Smithsonian Institution, and resulted in the creation of a typology of ceramics found.

The site was listed on the National Register of Historic Places in 1978.

== See also ==
- National Register of Historic Places listings in Sussex County, Delaware
