= Adams Home Farm =

Historic house in Delaware, United States

- U.S. National Register of Historic Places
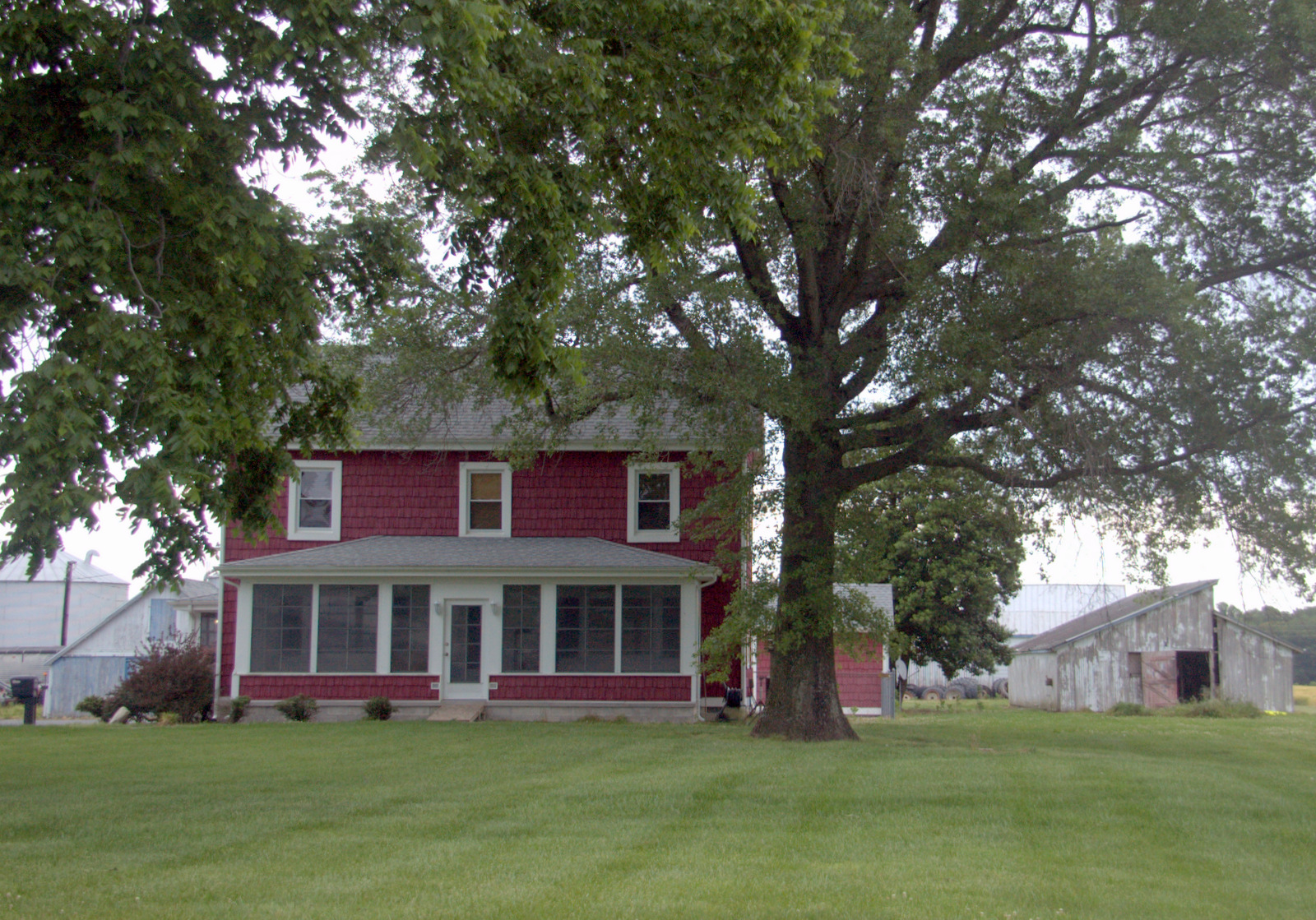

- Location within Delaware Location within the United States
- Location: 15293 Adams Rd./Old Bridgeville-Greenwood Rd., Greenwood, Delaware vicinity
- Coordinates: 38°46′26″N 75°36′33″W
- Area: 3 acres (1.2 ha) (listed area)
- Built: c. 1900
- NRHP reference No.: 14000532
- Added to NRHP: November 23, 2015

The Adams Home Farm is a historic farm property at 15293 Adams Road, in rural Sussex County, Delaware, roughly midway between Greenwood and Bridgeville. The farm, recorded as 211 acres (85 ha) in size in 2015, contains one of the state's best-preserved farm complexes, with an evolutionary history spanning more than 100 years. Five of its buildings (the house, a granary, two barns, and a carriage house) date to the c. 1850-70 period when the farm was first developed, and its other buildings reflect the evolutionary change in agricultural uses of the land over the following century.

The property was added to the National Register of Historic Places in 2015.

== See also ==
- National Register of Historic Places listings in Sussex County, Delaware
