= Warrington Site =

Archaeological site in Delaware, United States

- U.S. National Register of Historic Places
- Nearest city: Rehoboth Beach, Delaware
- Area: 2 acres (0.81 ha)
- NRHP reference No.: 77000398
- Added to NRHP: October 20, 1977

The Warrington Site is a prehistoric Native American site in Sussex County, Delaware. It is located east of County Road 274 on Warrington Neck, west of Rehoboth Beach. It encompasses a Native camp that was used on a seasonal or temporary basis for food production, and dates to the Woodland period, roughly between AD 1100 and AD 1370. Features found at the site include pits, apparently used for storage, that were carefully lined with shells.

The site was listed on the National Register of Historic Places in 1977.

== See also ==
- National Register of Historic Places listings in Sussex County, Delaware
