= Burton Hardware Store =

Historic place in Delaware, United States

- U.S. National Register of Historic Places
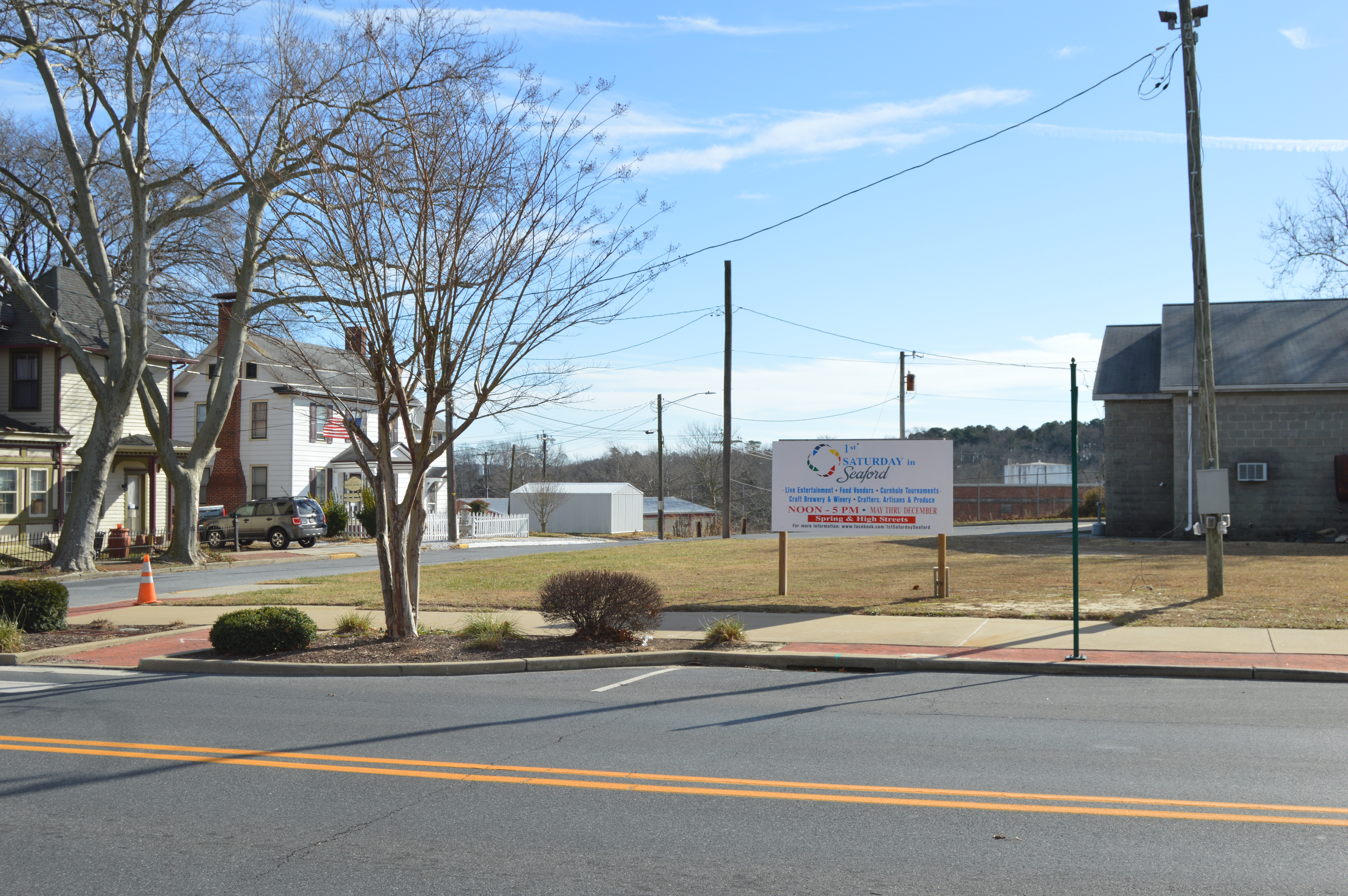
- Site of the store

- Location within Delaware Location within the United States
- Location: High St. and Spring Alley, Seaford, Delaware
- Coordinates: 38°38′29″N 75°36′39″W
- Area: 0.5 acres (0.20 ha)
- Built: c. 1900
- NRHP reference No.: 78000927
- Added to NRHP: April 20, 1978

Burton Hardware Store, also known as Burton Brothers Hardware Store, was a historic commercial building located at Seaford, Sussex County, Delaware. It was built about 1900, and was a two-story, roughly square, frame structure. It had a low-pitched roof and was partially sheathed in sheet metal imitations of rusticated cement blocks. The front facade featured an elaborate pressed metal cornice.

The building was added to the National Register of Historic Places in 1978. It was heavily damaged by fire in 2012 and then razed.

== See also ==
- National Register of Historic Places listings in Sussex County, Delaware
