= Roosevelt Inlet Shipwreck =

Archaeological site in Delaware, United States

- U.S. National Register of Historic Places
- Nearest city: Lewes, Delaware
- Area: 2.9 acres (1.2 ha)
- Architectural style: 18thC ship rigged commercial
- NRHP reference No.: 06001056
- Added to NRHP: November 16, 2006

The Roosevelt Inlet Shipwreck (7S-D-91A) is an 18th-century shipwreck in the waters of Delaware Bay near Lewes, Delaware. The wreck was discovered during dredging operations near Roosevelt Inlet in 2004, and was examined by underwater archaeologists in 2006. Analysis indicates that the ship was a commercial vessel that had probably come from Europe, and was wrecked sometime between 1772 and 1780. More than 40,000 artifacts were recovered after the dredging operation scattered remains of the wreck on area beaches, and another 26,000 were recovered by the archaeological divers. Only a small portion of the ship hull is intact, making further identification and analysis of the vessel difficult.

The site was listed on the National Register of Historic Places in 2006.

== See also ==
- National Register of Historic Places listings in Sussex County, Delaware
