= Evans–West House =

Historic house in Delaware, United States

- U.S. National Register of Historic Places
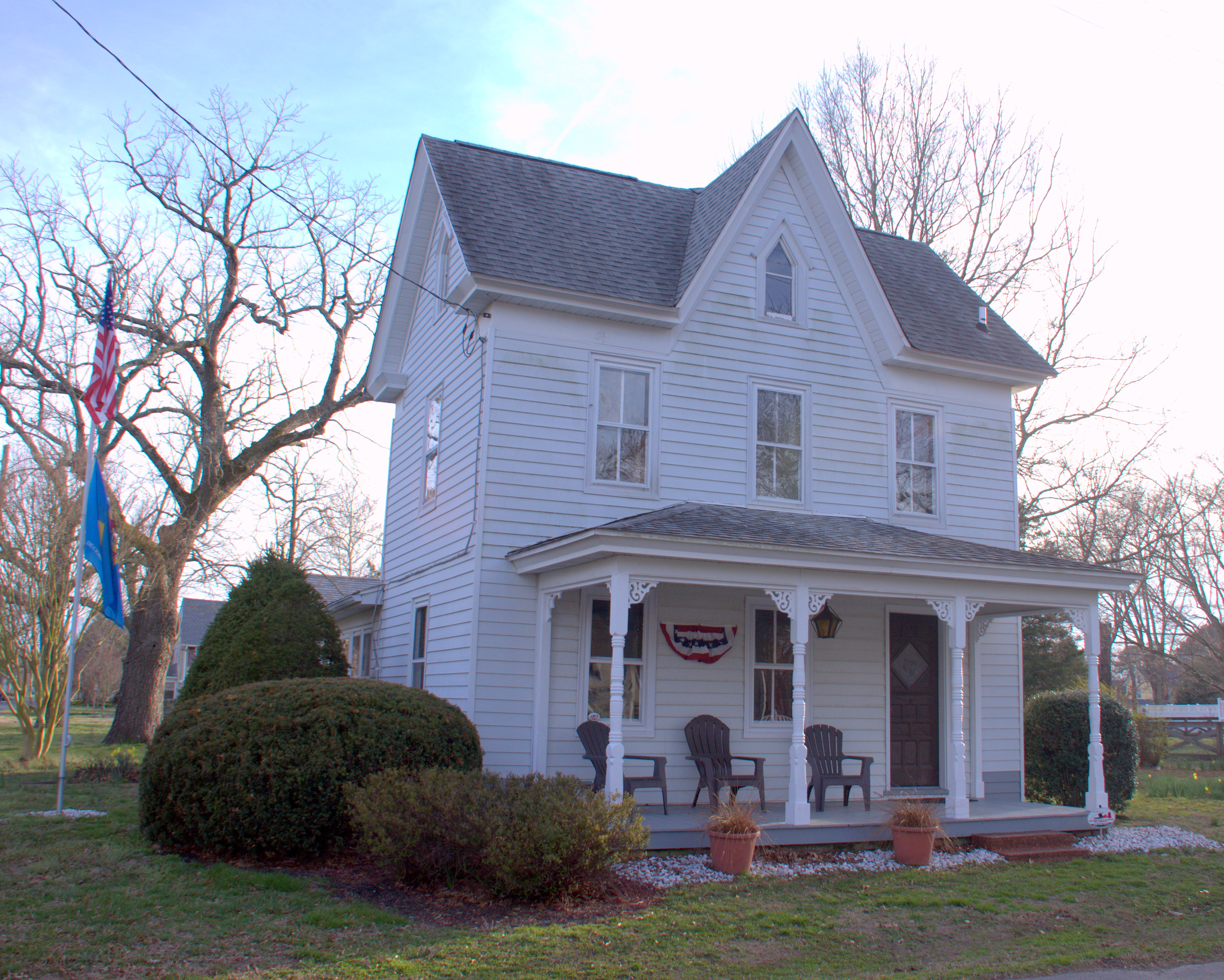

- Location within Delaware Location within the United States
- Location: 40 West Ave. Ocean View, Delaware
- Coordinates: 38°32′48″N 75°5′17″W
- Area: less than one acre
- Built: 1900
- NRHP reference No.: 15000844
- Added to NRHP: December 1, 2015

The Evans–West House is a historic house at 40 West Avenue (corner of Oakwood) in Ocean View, Delaware. It is a 2 1/2-story L-shaped wood-frame house, with clapboard siding, a cross-gable roof configuration, and a brick foundation. Its front, facing north toward Oakwood Avenue, is three bays wide, with a single-story hip-roofed porch extending across most of its width, supported by turned columns. The gable at the center of the roof has a pointed window at its center. The house, built 1900–04, is noted for a particularly well-preserved interior, with original floors, porcelain kitchen sink, and etched glass pane in the front door. The property is owned by the Ocean View Historical Society.

The house was added to the National Register of Historic Places in 2015.

== See also ==
- National Register of Historic Places listings in Sussex County, Delaware
