= Ball Theatre =

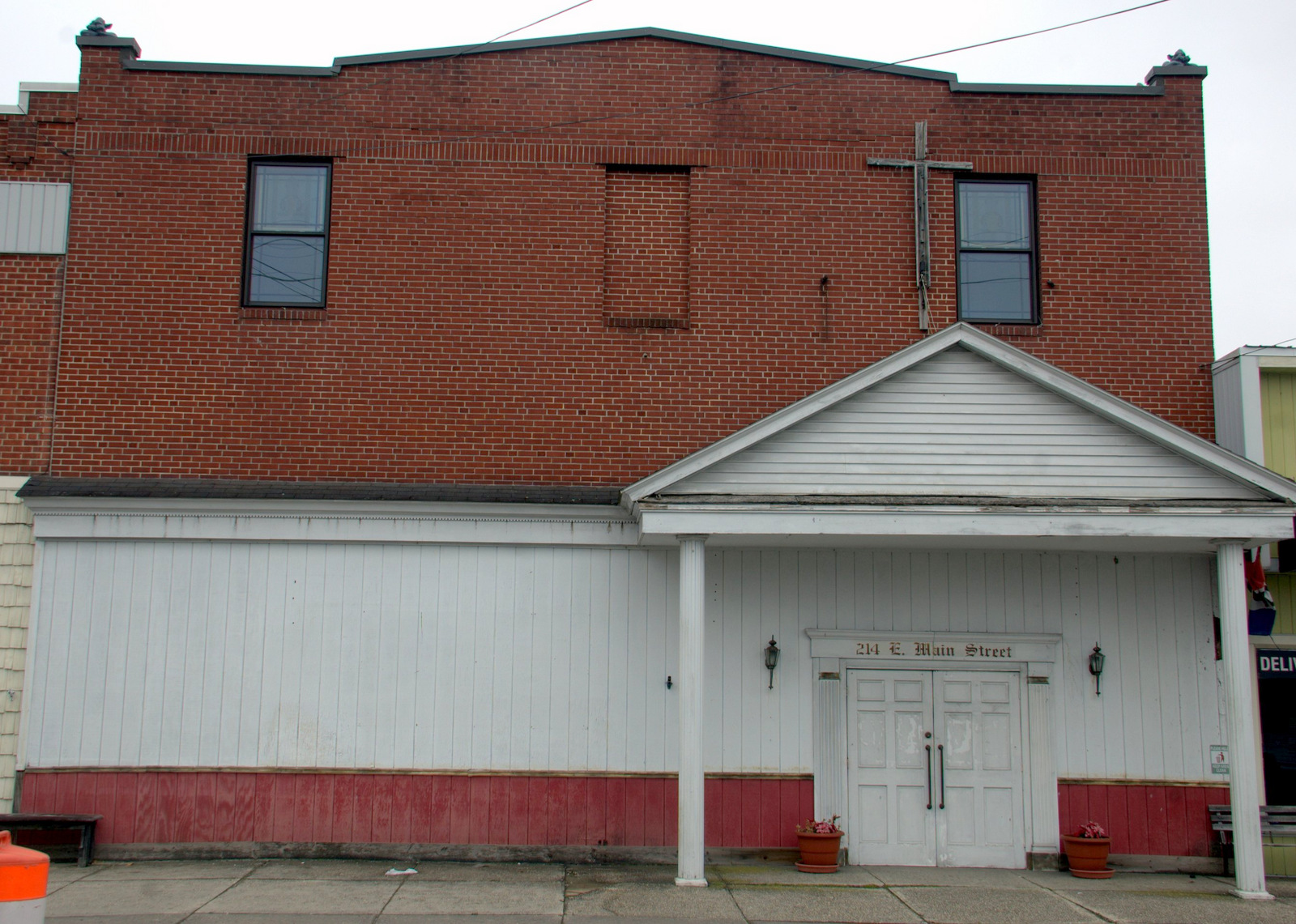
- Location: 214 Main Street, Millsboro, DE 19966

The Ball Theatre, also known as the Millstone Theatre, is a historic movie theater located in Millsboro, Delaware. It was listed on the National Register of Historic Places in 2018.
