= Carey's Camp Meeting Ground =

- U.S. National Register of Historic Places
- U.S. Historic district
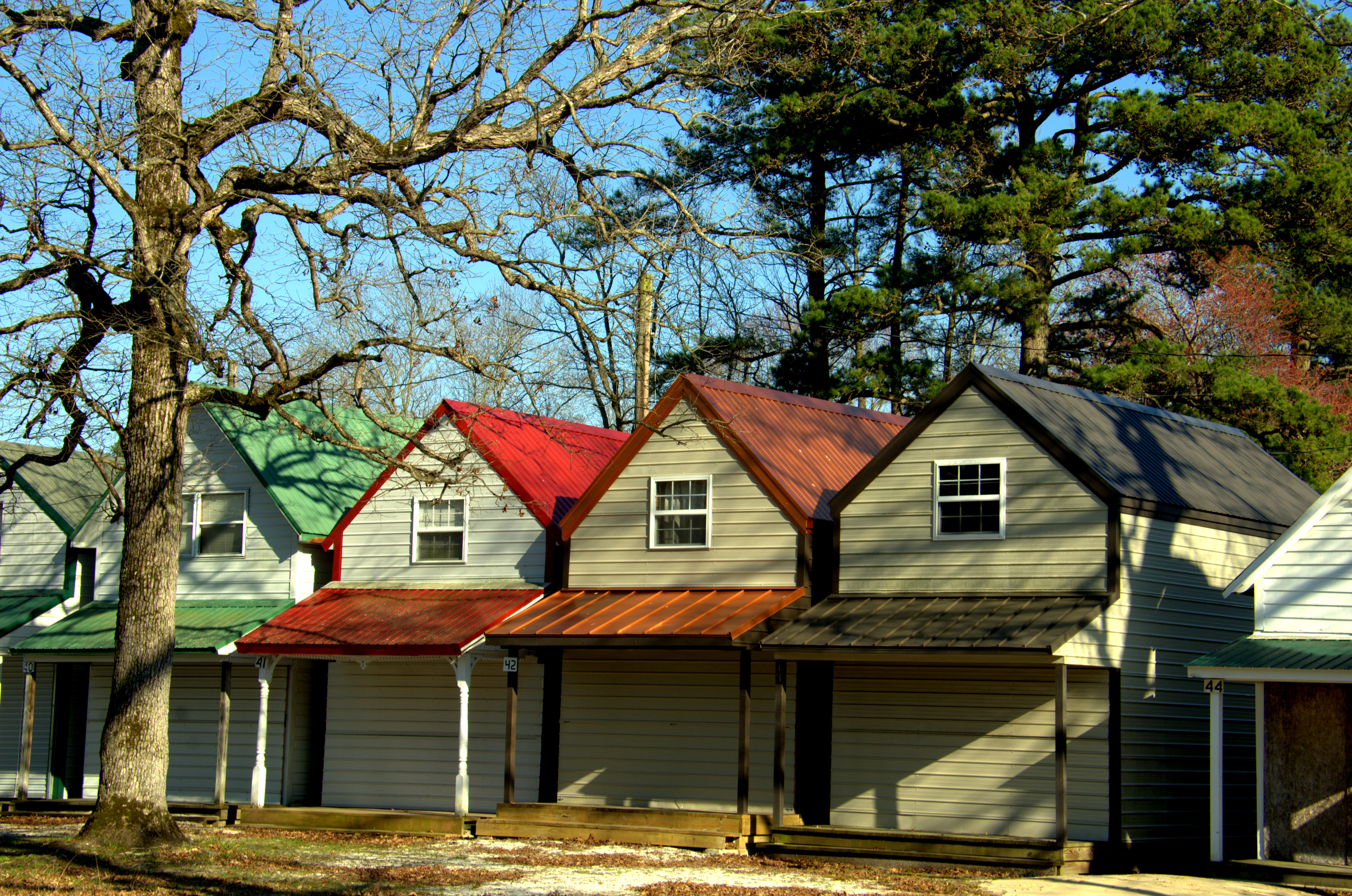

- Location within Delaware Location within the United States
- Location: West of Millsboro off Delaware Route 24, near Millsboro, Delaware
- Coordinates: 38°31′24″N 75°24′22″W
- Built: 1888
- NRHP reference No.: 73000557
- Added to NRHP: March 14, 1973

Carey's Camp was established in 1888 as a Methodist camp meeting near Millsboro, Sussex County, Delaware. Traditionally occupied for 12 days beginning the last Wednesday of July for prayer and religious instruction, the camp is composed of 47 wood cabins (called "tents") in an oval around a tabernacle. As with many such meeting grounds, the camp is located in a grove of oak trees. The front-gabled cabins almost touch each other. Each cabin has a window in the gable and a porch on the front. The rear of the porch is entirely open to the interior of the house, so that the cabin's occupants could see and be seen from the center. An enclosed kitchen is in the back of the cabin. Sleeping rooms are located upstairs.

Tents are usually owned by families, although a few tents, such as the preacher's, are owned by the camp committee. A boarding tent with six sleeping rooms offers food, and a confectionery is located outside the circle. At the center of the circle is the tabernacle. Originally a long shed, two arms were added to make it cruciform in shape, with three arms used for seating while a fourth serves as a chancel. Hinged panels open to allow a view into the tabernacle from outside. Benches outside accommodate overflow.

Carey's Camp was placed on the National Register of Historic Places in 1973.
