= Belltown, Delaware =

Unincorporated community in Delaware, United States

- Unincorporated community
- Location within Delaware Location within the United States
- Coordinates: 38°44′49″N 75°10′41″W
- Country: United States
- State: Delaware
- County: Sussex
- Elevation: 26 ft (7.9 m)
- Time zone: UTC-5 (Eastern (EST))
  - Summer (DST): UTC-4 (EDT)
- Area code: 302
- GNIS feature ID: 213630

Belltown is an unincorporated community in Sussex County, Delaware, United States. Belltown is located along U.S. Route 9, 5.5 miles (8.9 km) west-northwest of Rehoboth Beach.

== History ==
Belltown was founded about 1840 by Jacob Bell, a "free colored man." Under Delaware law, a person of color was one identified as being of one-sixteenth or more non-European stock. This included not only African Americans and persons of racially mixed ancestry, but Native Americans, such as the state-recognized Nanticoke Indian Association. Although nearby Lewes, the oldest town in Sussex County, had its own clearly defined minority neighborhoods, Belltown represents the first successful effort to create a separate community. Most of the residents of Belltown were dependent upon the nearby town for their livelihoods. Some, however, including the owners of the Norwood House, have been substantial landowners and the heirs of families who have owned their own farms at least since the early 19th century.
