= Spring Banke =

Historic house in Delaware, United States

- U.S. National Register of Historic Places
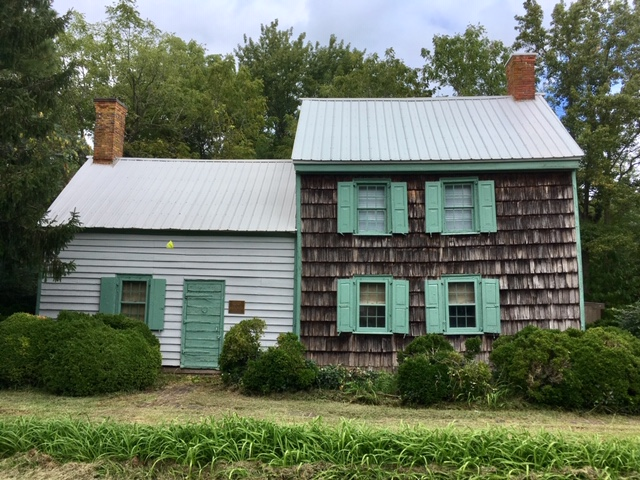

- Location within Delaware Location within the United States
- Location: Northeast of Clarksville on Delaware Route 26 and Irons Lane, near Clarksville, Delaware
- Coordinates: 38°33′9″N 75°8′24″W
- Area: 4 acres (1.6 ha)
- NRHP reference No.: 76000584
- Added to NRHP: April 30, 1976

Spring Banke is a historic home located near Clarksville, Sussex County, Delaware. It was built in two sections, both of oak and gum frame construction. The earlier section is 1 1/2 stories, with one room on each floor. The later section is two-stories, and has cypress siding. It is a rare example of an 18th-century, small house of a type that was occupied by tenants, small farmers, and other colonists of limited means.

It was added to the National Register of Historic Places in 1976.
