= Barnes Woods Archeological District =

Archaeological site in Delaware, United States

- U.S. National Register of Historic Places
- U.S. Historic district
- Nearest city: Seaford, Delaware
- Area: 18 acres (7.3 ha)
- NRHP reference No.: 96001413
- Added to NRHP: December 11, 1996

Barnes Woods Archeological District is a national historic district located near Seaford, Sussex County, Delaware. The district includes four contributing sites. They are two small base camps and two procurement camps, representing a segment of the settlement system of Native American groups living in the Nanticoke River drainage between about 3000 B.C. and A.D. 1700.

It was added to the National Register of Historic Places in 1996.
