= Gumboro, Delaware =

Unincorporated community in Delaware, United States

- Unincorporated community
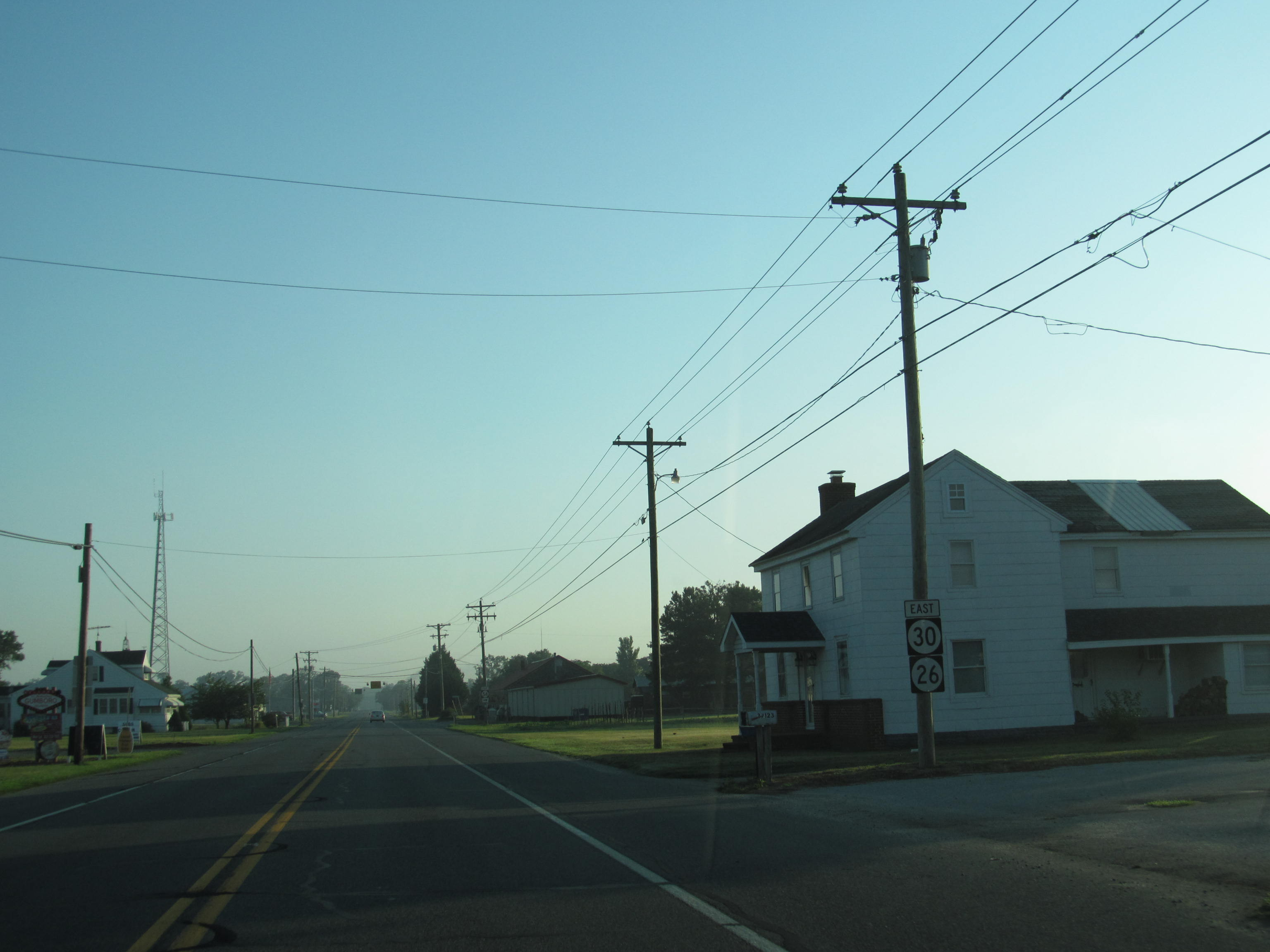
- Millsboro Highway in Gumboro

- Location within the state of Delaware Gumboro (the United States)
- Coordinates: 38°28′39″N 75°21′55″W
- Country: United States
- State: Delaware
- County: Sussex
- Elevation: 43 ft (13 m)
- Time zone: UTC-5 (Eastern (EST))
  - Summer (DST): UTC-4 (EDT)
- ZIP code: 19966
- Area code: 302
- GNIS feature ID: 216106

Gumboro is an unincorporated community in Sussex County, Delaware, United States. It is part of the Salisbury, Maryland-Delaware Metropolitan Statistical Area. In 2006, legislation to establish Gumboro as an incorporated town was passed by the Delaware General Assembly, but and was vetoed by Governor Ruth Ann Minner as no civic government was to be immediately convened, leaving a gap in government from when the town was incorporated and left county control, until the election of a government.

Infectious bursal disease virus (IBDV) was first discovered in Gumboro in 1962 and thus has been known as Gumboro disease. This virus causes an immuno-suppressive disease in chickens. The disease is usually sub-clinical in birds less than two weeks of age and clinical disease is generally observed in birds over two weeks of age.

The town has a community center along Millsboro Highway that previously was used as a school house. The town is also home to Bayshore Community Church, a large church compared to others in the area.

The West Woods Methodist Episcopal Church was listed on the National Register of Historic Places in 2007.
