= Atlanta, Delaware =

Unincorporated community in Delaware, United States

- Unincorporated community
- Location within Delaware Location within the United States
- Coordinates: 38°42′31″N 75°40′41″W
- Country: United States
- State: Delaware
- County: Sussex
- Elevation: 49 ft (15 m)
- Time zone: UTC-5 (Eastern (EST))
  - Summer (DST): UTC-4 (EDT)
- Area code: 302
- GNIS feature ID: 216021

Atlanta is an unincorporated community in Sussex County, Delaware, United States. Atlanta is located on Delaware Route 18 near the Maryland border.

The Melson House was added to the National Register of Historic Places in 1978.
