= Capt. Ebe Chandler House =

Historic house in Delaware, United States

- U.S. National Register of Historic Places
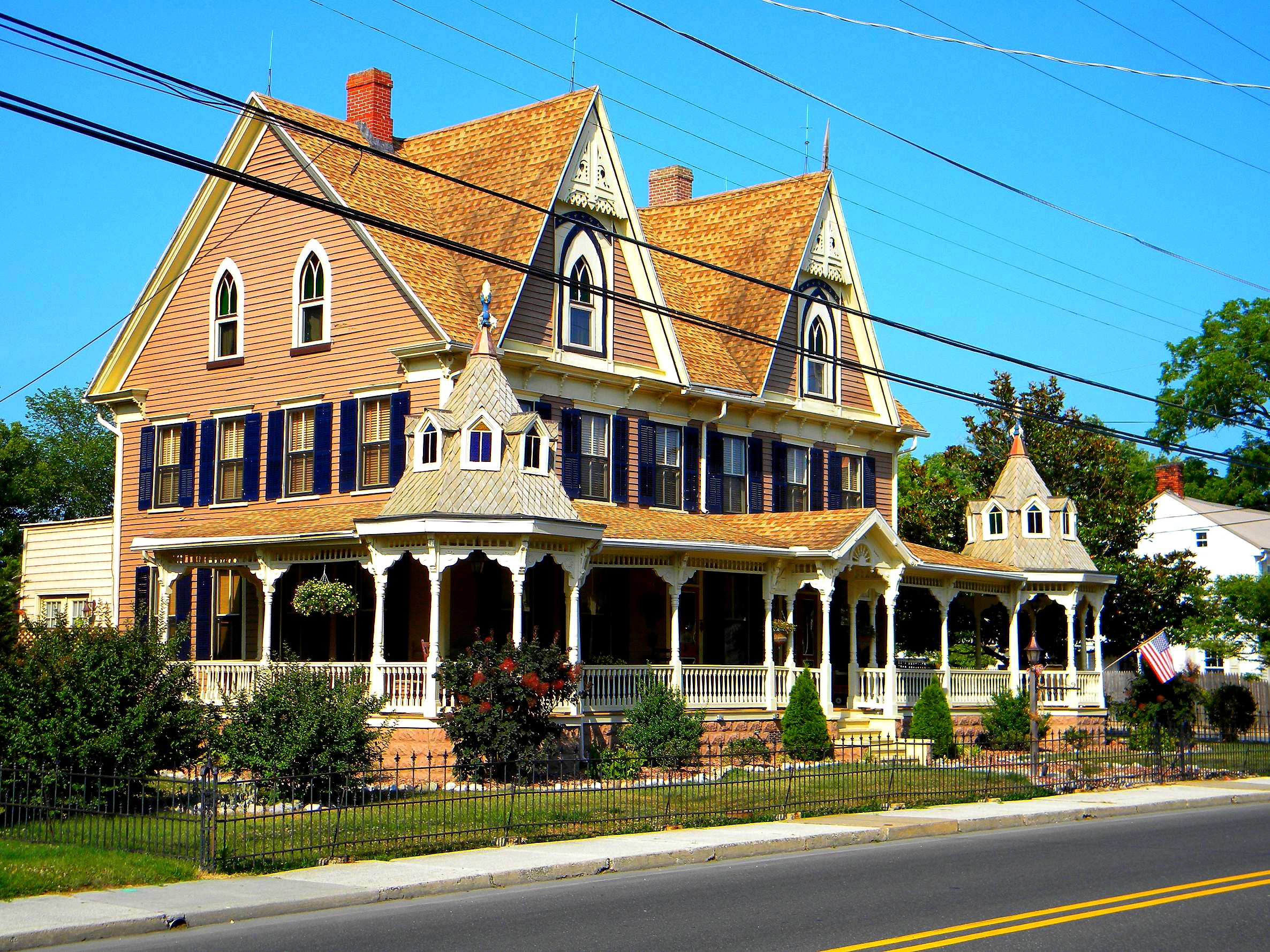

- Location within Delaware Location within the United States
- Location: Main and Reed Sts., Frankford, Delaware
- Coordinates: 38°31′1″N 75°14′2″W
- Area: less than one acre
- Built: 1880, 1918
- Architectural style: Gothic, Eclectic
- NRHP reference No.: 79000643
- Added to NRHP: September 20, 1979

Capt. Ebe Chandler House is a historic home located at Frankford, Sussex County, Delaware. It was built in 1880, and is a 2 1/2-story, six-bay, double-pile frame dwelling in the Victorian Gothic style. It has a gable roof with two massive cross gables and lancet windows. Elaborate Carpenter Gothic and eclectic detailing were added in 1918. The front porch features corner gazebos, located at each of the front corners of the porch. It has been converted to two duplex apartments. Capt. Ebe Chandler purchased the house in 1918, and was a local politician, civic leader, and a spiritualist medium.

It was added to the National Register of Historic Places in 1979.
