= West Woods Methodist Episcopal Church =

Historic church in Delaware, United States

- U.S. National Register of Historic Places
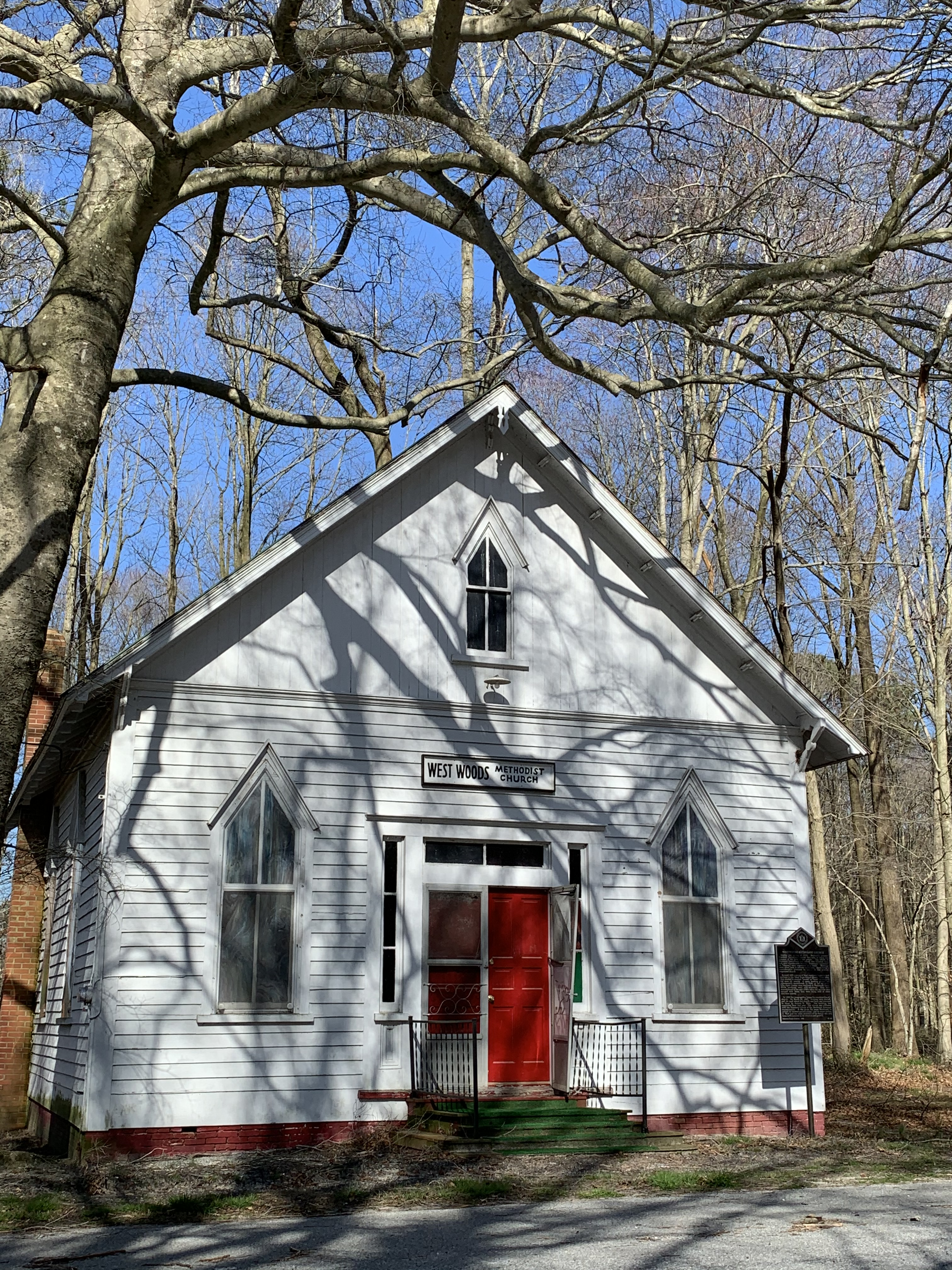

- Location within Delaware Location within the United States
- Location: West Woods Rd., west of Millsboro Hwy., Gumboro, Delaware
- Coordinates: 38°30′29″N 75°22′12″W
- Area: less than one acre
- Built: 1891
- Architect: Marshall Smith; Winder LeCates,
- Architectural style: Late Gothic Revival
- NRHP reference No.: 07000246
- Added to NRHP: July 20, 2007

West Woods Methodist Episcopal Church is a historic Methodist Episcopal church located at Gumboro, Sussex County, Delaware. It was built in 1891, and is in the Gothic Revival style.

It was added to the National Register of Historic Places in 2007.
