= Blackwater Presbyterian Church =

Historic church in Delaware, United States

- U.S. National Register of Historic Places
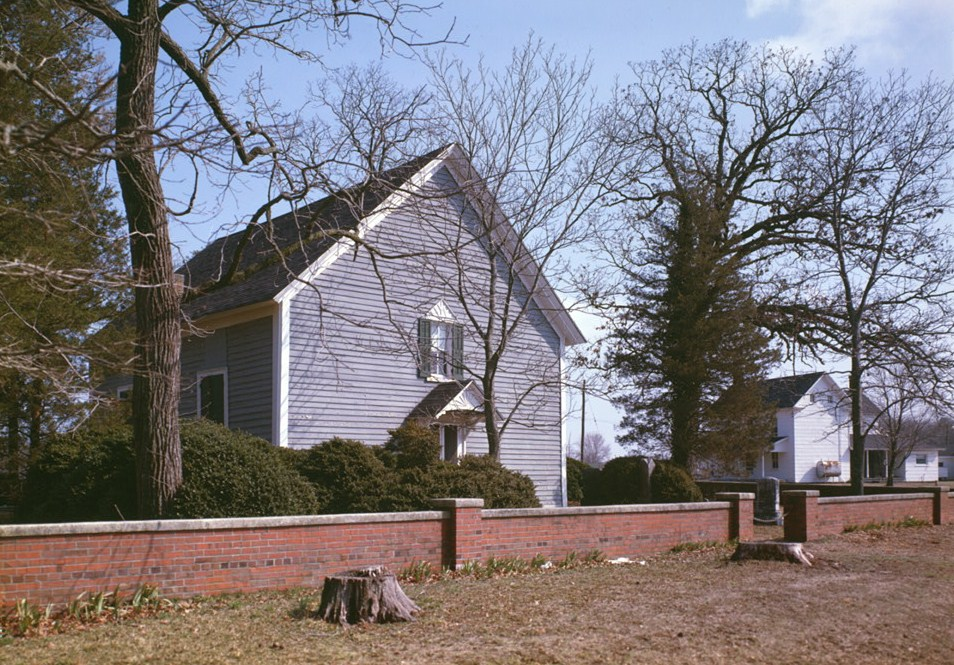
- Blackwater Presbyterian Church in 1982

- Location within Delaware Location within the United States
- Location: West of Clarksville on Delaware Route 54, Clarksville, Delaware
- Coordinates: 38°32′44″N 75°9′43″W
- Area: less than one acre
- Built: 1767, 1893
- Architectural style: Victorian
- NRHP reference No.: 76000583
- Added to NRHP: July 09, 1976

Blackwater Presbyterian Church was a historic Presbyterian church building located near Clarksville, Sussex County, Delaware. It was built in 1767 and rebuilt in 1893. It was a small, frame chapel sheathed in clapboard and measuring 35 feet by 30 feet. It featured a portico supported by a Victorian style bracket. It was the oldest Presbyterian church building in Southern Delaware. The congregation was abolished in October 1921.

It was added to the National Register of Historic Places in 1976. In the 1970s, the church was restored by the Colonel Armwell Long Chapter the Daughters of the American Revolution. In May 2018, the church, which was structurally unsound, was demolished.

According to official state sources:

Many of the early settlers of this region, then a part of Maryland, were Presbyterians who had been denied their freedom of worship. For many years local Presbyterians were forced to travel a great distance to the nearest church. In 1763, a congregation was organized in this area by Reverend Charles Tennent, the charismatic son of William Tennent, founder of Princeton University. Services were held in the homes of members until 1767 when the present Blackwater Presbyterian Church was constructed. Over time the travel conditions faced by many members resulted in the formation of separate churches in the growing communities of Ocean View and Frankford. By the late 19th century, regular services at Blackwater had been discontinued. Occasional meetings were held until 1921, when the church organization was formally abolished. Since 1949, the property has been managed by a Trust established by the Tunnell family, who have been active supporters of the church since its founding.
