= All Saints Episcopal Church (Rehoboth Beach, Delaware) =

Historic church in Delaware, United States

- All Saints' Episcopal Church
- U.S. National Register of Historic Places
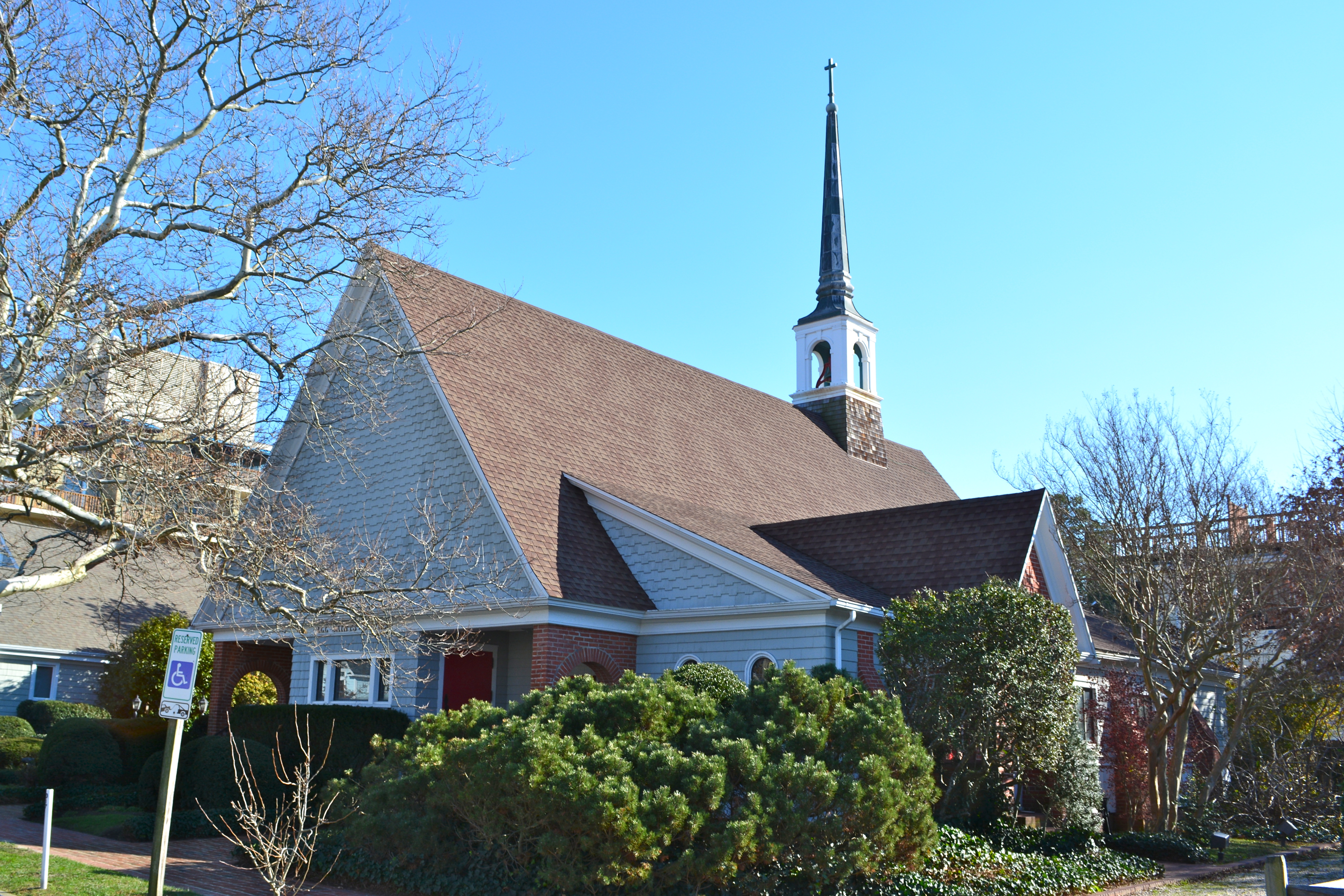

- Location within Delaware Location within the United States
- Location: 18 Olive Ave., Lewes and Rehoboth Hundred, Rehoboth Beach, Delaware
- Coordinates: 38°43′7″N 75°4′42″W
- Area: 0.3 acres (0.12 ha)
- Built: 1893; 133 years ago
- Architectural style: Bungalow/Craftsman
- NRHP reference No.: 91000910
- Added to NRHP: August 2, 1991

All Saints' Episcopal Church is a historic Episcopal church located at 18 Olive Avenue, Lewes and Rehoboth Hundred in Rehoboth Beach, Sussex County, Delaware. It was built in 1893 for the summer services of an Episcopal congregation. It is a one-story structure constructed of hand-molded brick, measuring 100 by 30 feet (30.5 by 9.1 m). It features board-and-batten wainscotting, fishscale shingled gable ends, ribbon windows, and a low-pitched gable roof in the Arts and Crafts style. The church was renovated after a fire in 1938. It is joined with St. George's Chapel, Lewes in the Episcopal Parish of All Saints’ Church & St. George's Chapel.

It was added to the National Register of Historic Places in 1991.

The church reported 782 members in 2016 and 323 members in 2023; no membership statistics were reported in 2024 parochial reports. Plate and pledge income reported for the congregation in 2024 was $0.00 with average Sunday attendance (ASA) of zero persons.
