= Norwood House (Lewes, Delaware) =

Historic house in Delaware, United States

- U.S. National Register of Historic Places
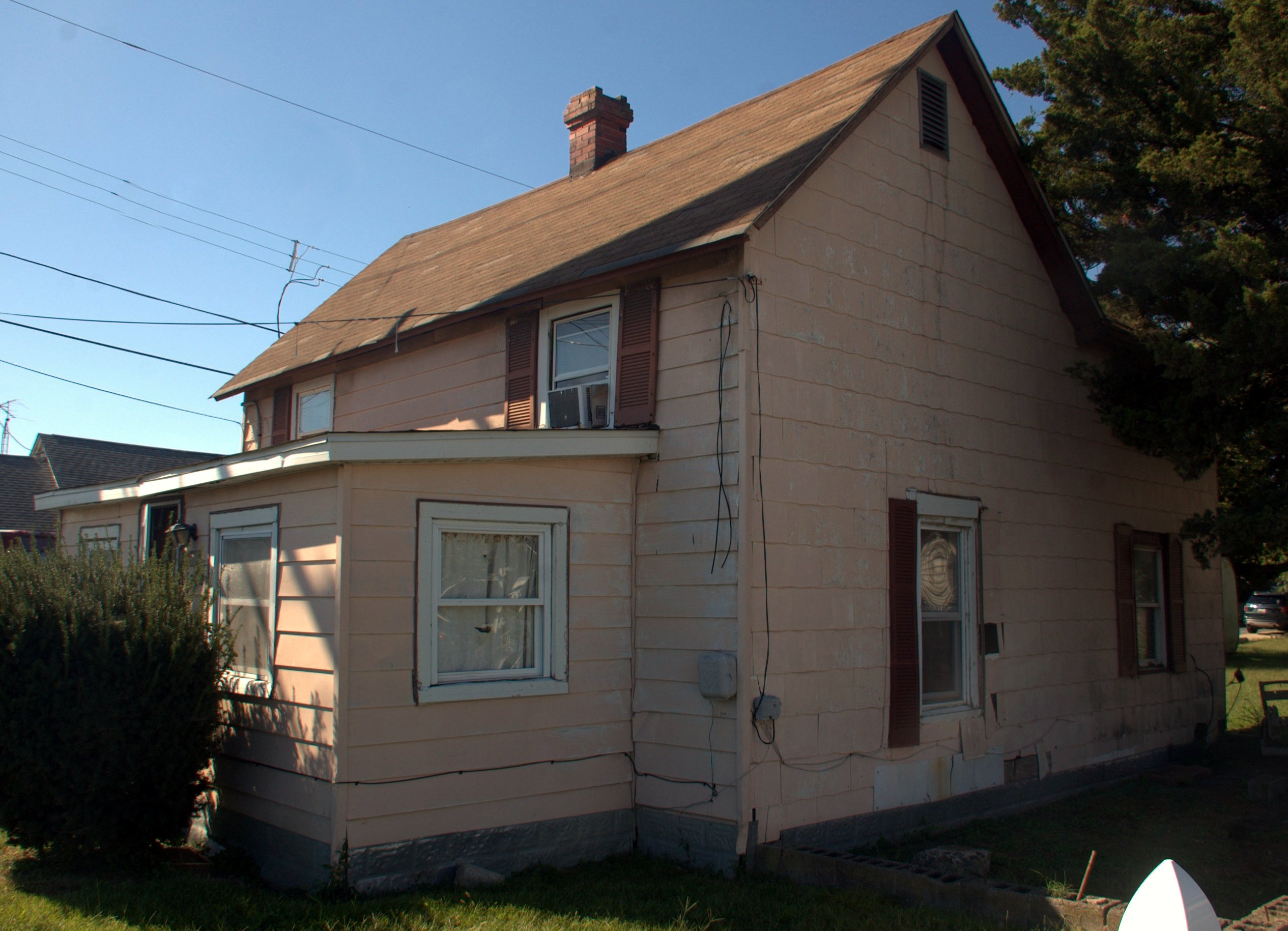

- Location within Delaware Location within the United States
- Location: Southwest of Lewes on U.S. Route 9, near Lewes, Delaware
- Coordinates: 38°44′47″N 75°10′48″W
- Area: 2 acres (0.81 ha)
- Built: c. 1850
- Built by: Johnson
- NRHP reference No.: 82001030
- Added to NRHP: October 25, 1982

Norwood House is a historic home located near Lewes, Sussex County, Delaware. It was built about 1850, and is two-story, three-bay, single-pile, frame house. It has a rectangular plan and sits on a brick foundation. The house is sheathed in weatherboard with cornerboards and has a shingled gable roof. A single story section extends down the entire length of the rear of the house and there is an earlier one-story section located on the north rear. Also on the property is a contributing privy. It is a virtually unaltered survivor of Belltown, a 19th-century "free colored" community.

It was added to the National Register of Historic Places in 1982.

== See also ==
- National Register of Historic Places listings in Sussex County, Delaware
