= Clarksville, Delaware =

Unincorporated community in Delaware, United States

- Unincorporated community
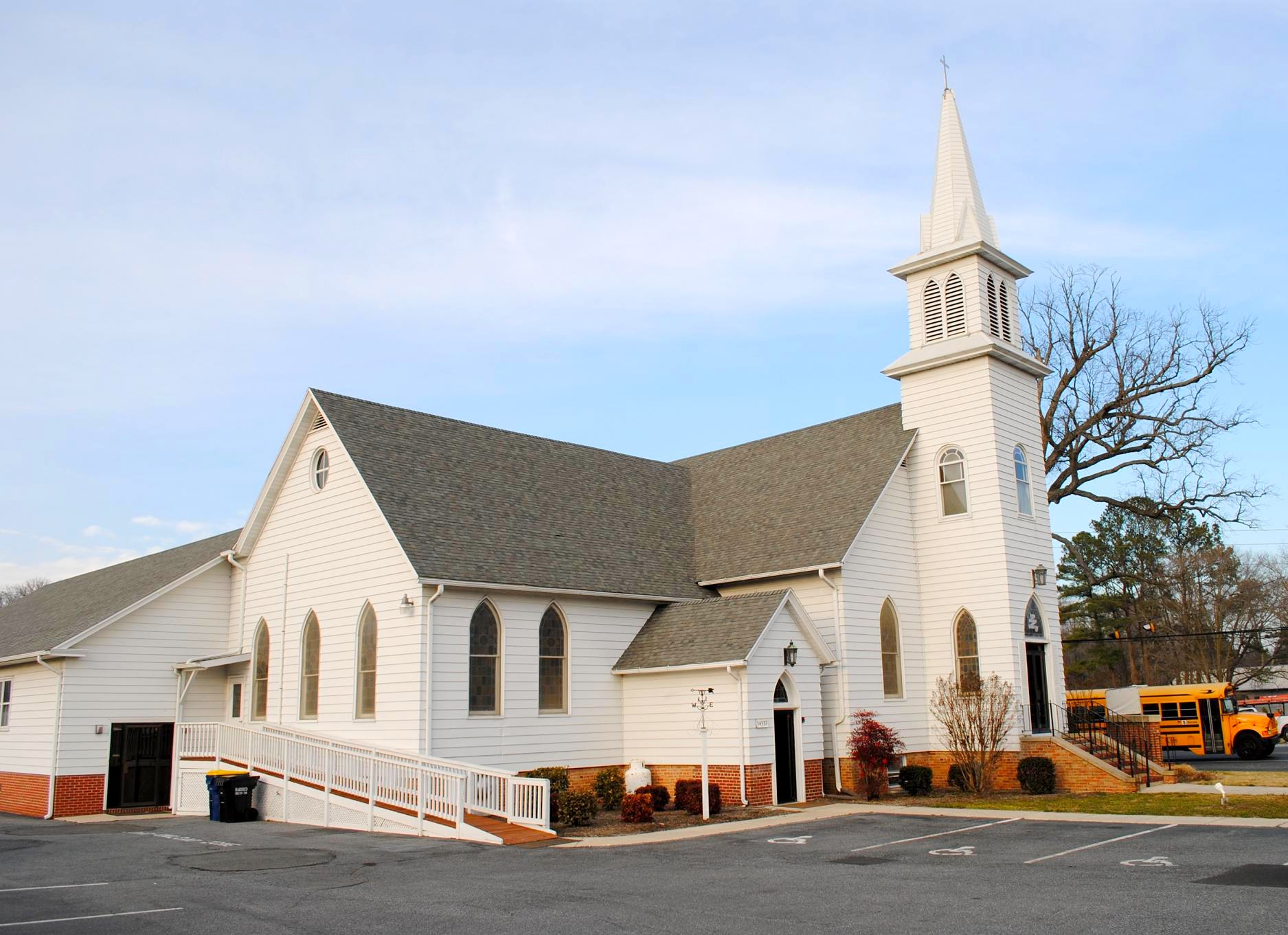
- St. Georges United Methodist Church, January 2012

- Location of Clarksville in Delaware Clarksville (the United States)
- Coordinates: 38°32′56″N 75°08′52″W
- Country: United States
- State: Delaware
- County: Sussex
- Elevation: 16 ft (4.9 m)
- Time zone: UTC-5 (Eastern (EST))
  - Summer (DST): UTC-4 (EDT)
- ZIP code: 19970
- Area code: 302
- FIPS code: 10005
- GNIS feature ID: 216066

Clarksville is an unincorporated community in Baltimore Hundred, Sussex County, Delaware, United States located just west of Millville. It is centered, more or less, along Delaware Route 26. Many tourists from the Baltimore–Washington metropolitan area pass through the town on their way to and from the Delaware Beaches.

The Blackwater Presbyterian Church and Spring Banke near Clarksville are listed on the National Register of Historic Places.

== History ==
Clarksville's population was 16 in 1900, 63 in 1925, and 200 in 1960. Clarksville formerly had a post office with a ZIP code of 19937; however, the post office closed and the ZIP code was discontinued. Clarksville is currently served by the Ocean View post office with a ZIP code of 19970.
