= Middleford, Delaware =

Unincorporated community in Delaware, United States

- Unincorporated community
- Location within Delaware Location within the United States
- Coordinates: 38°40′0″N 75°34′2″W
- Country: United States
- State: Delaware
- County: Sussex
- Elevation: 20 ft (6.1 m)
- Time zone: UTC-5 (Eastern (EST))
  - Summer (DST): UTC-4 (EDT)
- Area code: 302
- GNIS feature ID: 216154

Middleford is an unincorporated community in Sussex County, Delaware, United States. Middleford is located at the intersection of Old Furnace Road and Middleford Road, northeast of Seaford.
