= St. George's Chapel, Lewes =

Historic church in Delaware, United States

- St. George's Chapel
- U.S. National Register of Historic Places
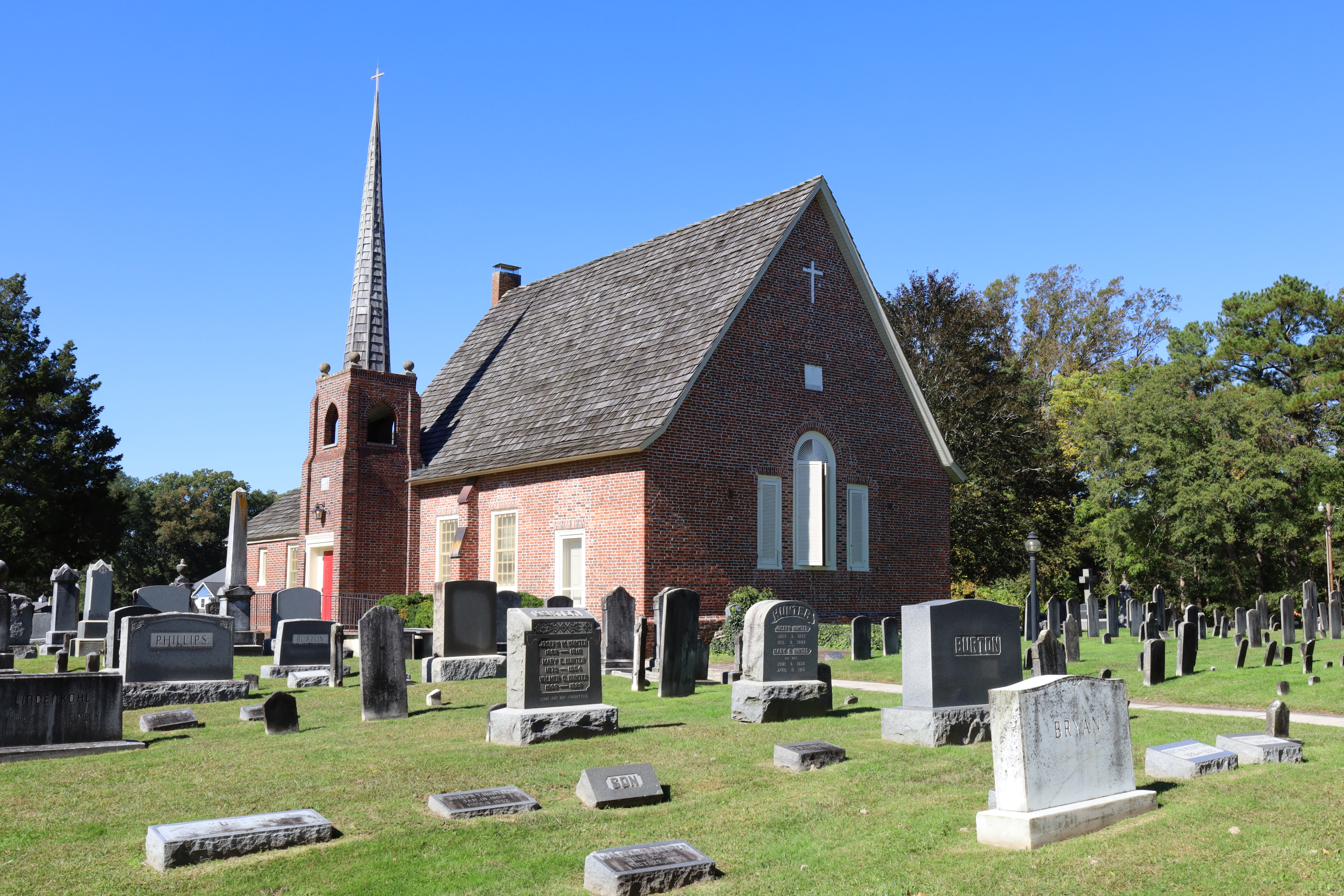

- Location within Delaware Location within the United States
- Location: 9 miles southwest of Lewes on Delaware Route 5, near Lewes, Delaware
- Coordinates: 38°41′8″N 75°13′9″W
- Area: 5 acres (2.0 ha)
- Built: 1794
- NRHP reference No.: 73000556
- Added to NRHP: November 30, 1973

St. George's Chapel is a historic Episcopal chapel located near Angola, Sussex County, Delaware on the Indian River Hundred. The original building was built in 1719 but burned down in 1792. The new chapel was built in 1794, and is a one-story brick structure measuring 42 feet by 32 feet. It has a brick tower at the southwest corner, built in 1955, and features a restored Palladian window. The original furnishings were removed in 1850 and the roof replaced in 1882 with a steep gable roof. The chapel was restored in 1966. It is joined with All Saints Episcopal Church in the Episcopal Parish of All Saints’ Church & St. George's Chapel.

It was added to the National Register of Historic Places in 1973.
