= Frankford, Delaware =

- Town
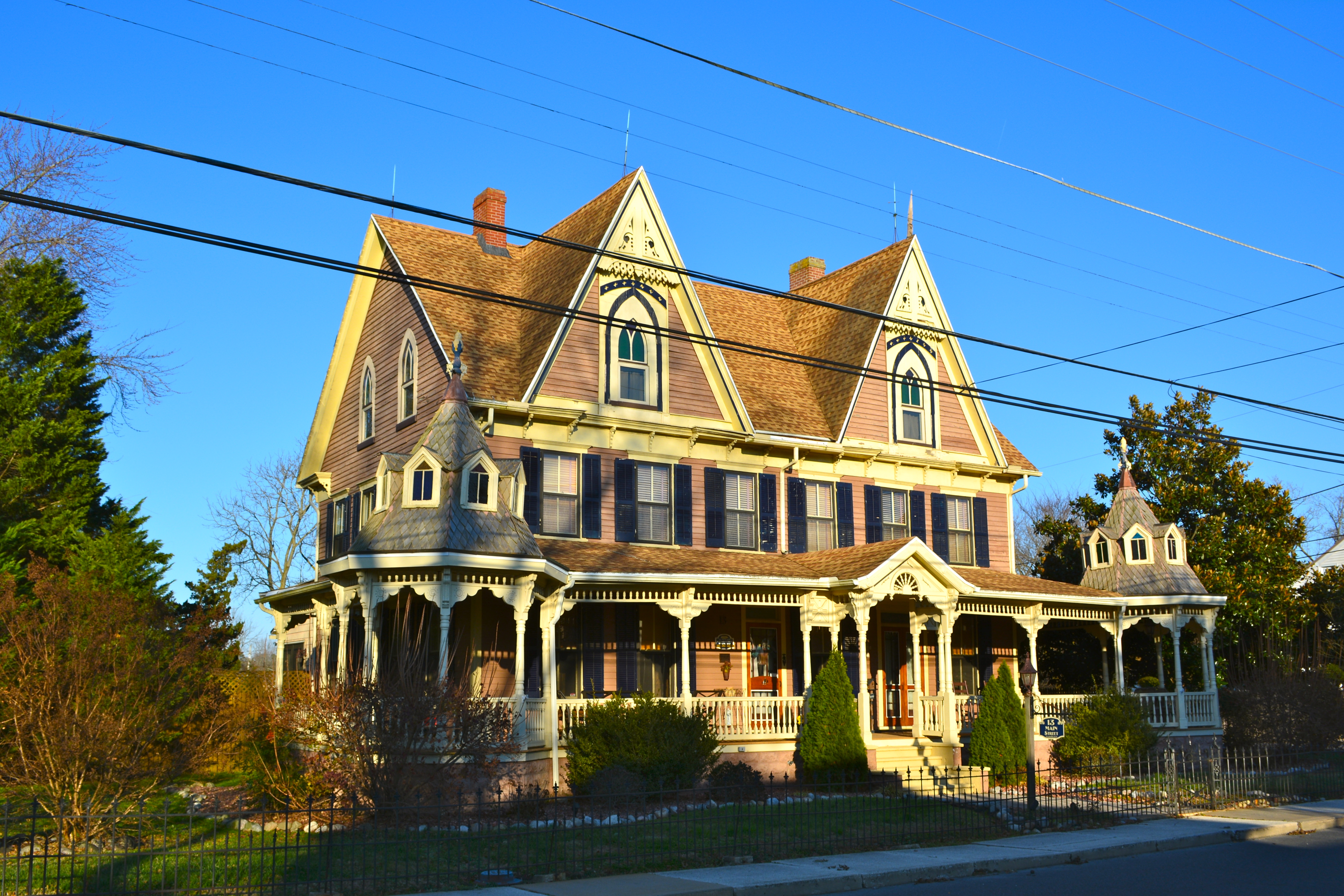
- Capt. Ebe Chandler House

- Icon

- Location of Frankford in Sussex County, Delaware.

- Location within the state of Delaware Frankford (the United States)
- Coordinates: 38°31′02″N 75°14′06″W
- Country: United States
- State: Delaware
- County: Sussex

Government
  - Council President: Greg Welch
  - Town Manager: Sheldon Hudson

Area
  - Total: 0.73 sq mi (1.89 km^{2})
  - Land: 0.73 sq mi (1.89 km^{2})
  - Water: 0 sq mi (0.00 km^{2})
- Elevation: 36 ft (11 m)

Population (2020)
  - Total: 790
  - Density: 1,083.8/sq mi (418.47/km^{2})
- Time zone: UTC−5 (Eastern (EST))
  - Summer (DST): UTC−4 (EDT)
- ZIP code: 19945
- Area code: 302
- FIPS code: 10-28310
- GNIS feature ID: 213980
- Website: frankford.delaware.gov

Frankford is a town in Sussex County, Delaware, United States. As of the 2020 census, Frankford had a population of 790. It is part of the Salisbury, Maryland-Delaware Metropolitan Statistical Area.

== History ==
Located on U.S. Route 113, Frankford, was founded in 1808 and incorporated in 1937. The town was named Frankford Village in 1848 upon the acquisition of a post office. The establishment of the Pennsylvania Railroad brought a hotel, commercial establishments and an opera house to make Frankford a thriving commercial and cultural center.

The Capt. Ebe Chandler House (1880) was added to the National Register of Historic Places in 1979.

== Transportation ==
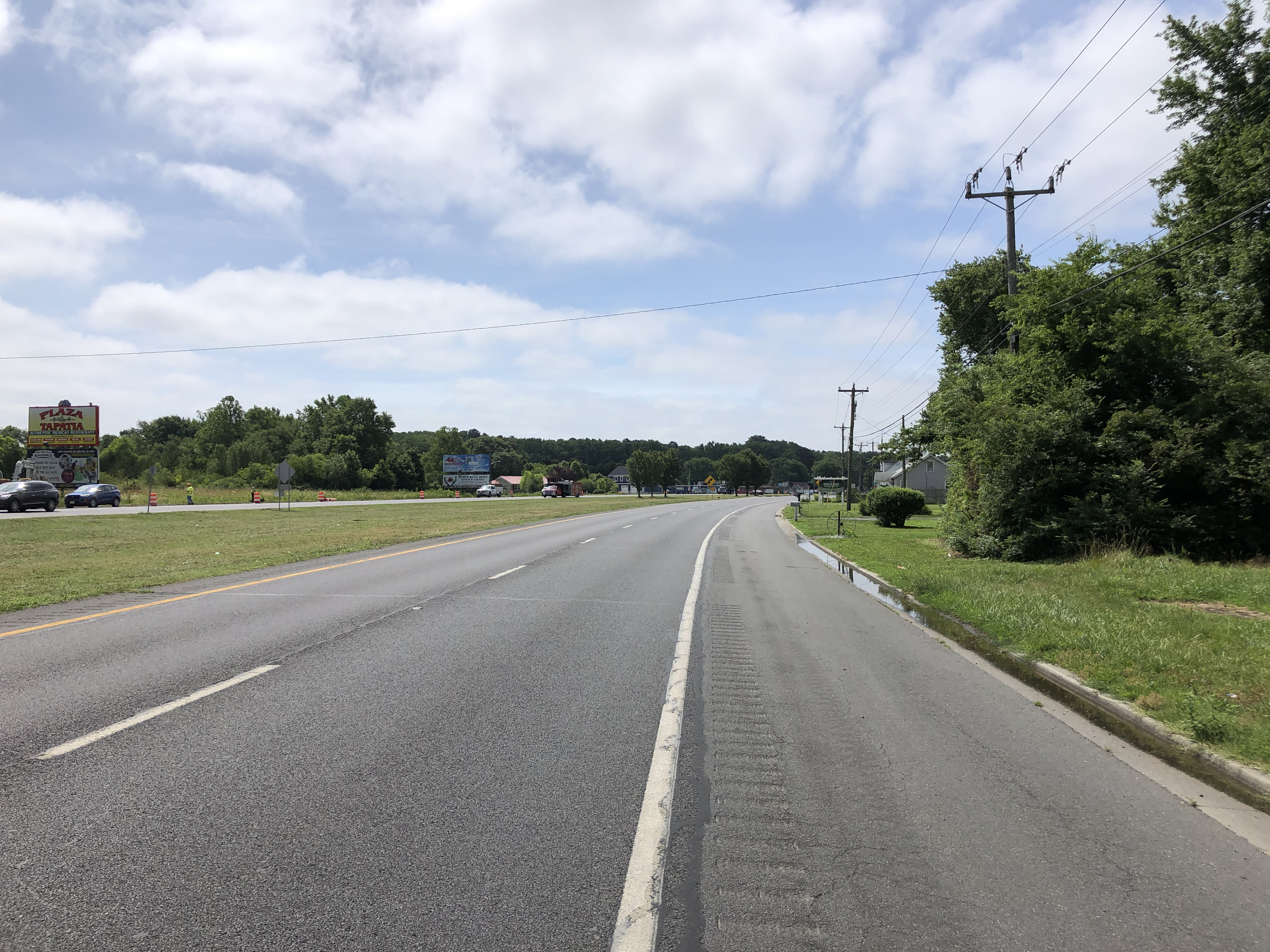
US 113 southbound in Frankford

Road is the primary method of travel to and from Frankford. U.S. Route 113 is the only significant highway serving the town, extending north toward Georgetown and south into Maryland. Frankford is the location of an interchange between the Delmarva Central Railroad and the Maryland and Delaware Railroad.

== Demographics ==
Historical population
Census	Pop.	Note	%±
1880	380		—
1890	519		36.6%
1900	424		−18.3%
1910	395		−6.8%
1920	443		12.2%
1930	450		1.6%
1940	563		25.1%
1950	615		9.2%
1960	558		−9.3%
1970	635		13.8%
1980	828		30.4%
1990	591		−28.6%
2000	714		20.8%
2010	847		18.6%
2020	790		−6.7%
U.S. Decennial Census

At the 2000 census there were 714 people, 227 households, and 172 families living in the town. The population density was 1,012.7 inhabitants per square mile (391.0/km^{2}). There were 258 housing units at an average density of 365.9 units per square mile (141.3 units/km^{2}). The racial makeup of the town was 45.24% White, 35.01% African American, 2.94% Native American, 0.42% Asian, 10.92% from other races, and 5.46% from two or more races. Hispanic or Latino of any race were 20.73%.

Of the 227 households 37.4% had children under the age of 18 living with them, 52.0% were married couples living together, 16.7% had a female householder with no husband present, and 24.2% were non-families. 18.9% of households were one person and 11.0% were one person aged 65 or older. The average household size was 3.15 and the average family size was 3.62.

The age distribution was 32.5% under the age of 18, 9.5% from 18 to 24, 25.4% from 25 to 44, 19.3% from 45 to 64, and 13.3% 65 or older. The median age was 31 years. For every 100 females, there were 88.9 males. For every 100 females age 18 and over, there were 88.3 males.

The median household income was $35,333 and the median family income was $35,729. Males had a median income of $24,375 versus $20,875 for females. The per capita income for the town was $13,711. About 9.5% of families and 14.5% of the population were below the poverty line, including 21.5% of those under age 18 and 16.4% of those age 65 or over.

== Climate ==
Frankford experiences a Humid subtropical climate (cfa) with all year precipitation, warm to hot summers and mild, wet winters.

== Education ==
Frankford is in the Indian River School District.
