= Short House =

Short House may refer to:

in the United States (by state then town)

- William A. Short House, Helena, Arkansas, listed on the National Register of Historic Places (NRHP) in Phillips County
- Short-Dodson House, Hot Springs, Arkansas, listed on the NRHP in Garland County
- Short Homestead, Georgetown, Delaware, listed on the NRHP in Sussex County, Delaware
- O. F. Short House, Eagle, Idaho, listed on the NRHP in Ada County
- George Short House, Greenville, Kentucky, listed on the NRHP in Muhlenberg County, Kentucky

== See also ==
- Shorter House (disambiguation)
