= Sussex County Courthouse =

Sussex County Courthouse may refer to:

- Sussex County Courthouse and the Circle, Georgetown, Delaware
- Sussex County Courthouse (New Jersey), Newton, New Jersey
- Old Sussex County Courthouse, Georgetown, Delaware
- Sussex County Courthouse Historic District, Sussex, Virginia
