= Shorter House =

Shorter House may refer to:

== United States ==
- Shorter Mansion, Eufaula, Alabama, listed on the National Register of Historic Places in Barbour County, Alabama
- Shorter House (Crawford, New York), listed on the NRHP in Orange County, New York

== United Kingdom ==
- Shorter House (music publisher)

== See also ==
- Short House (disambiguation)
