= David Carlton Pepper Farm =

- U.S. National Register of Historic Places
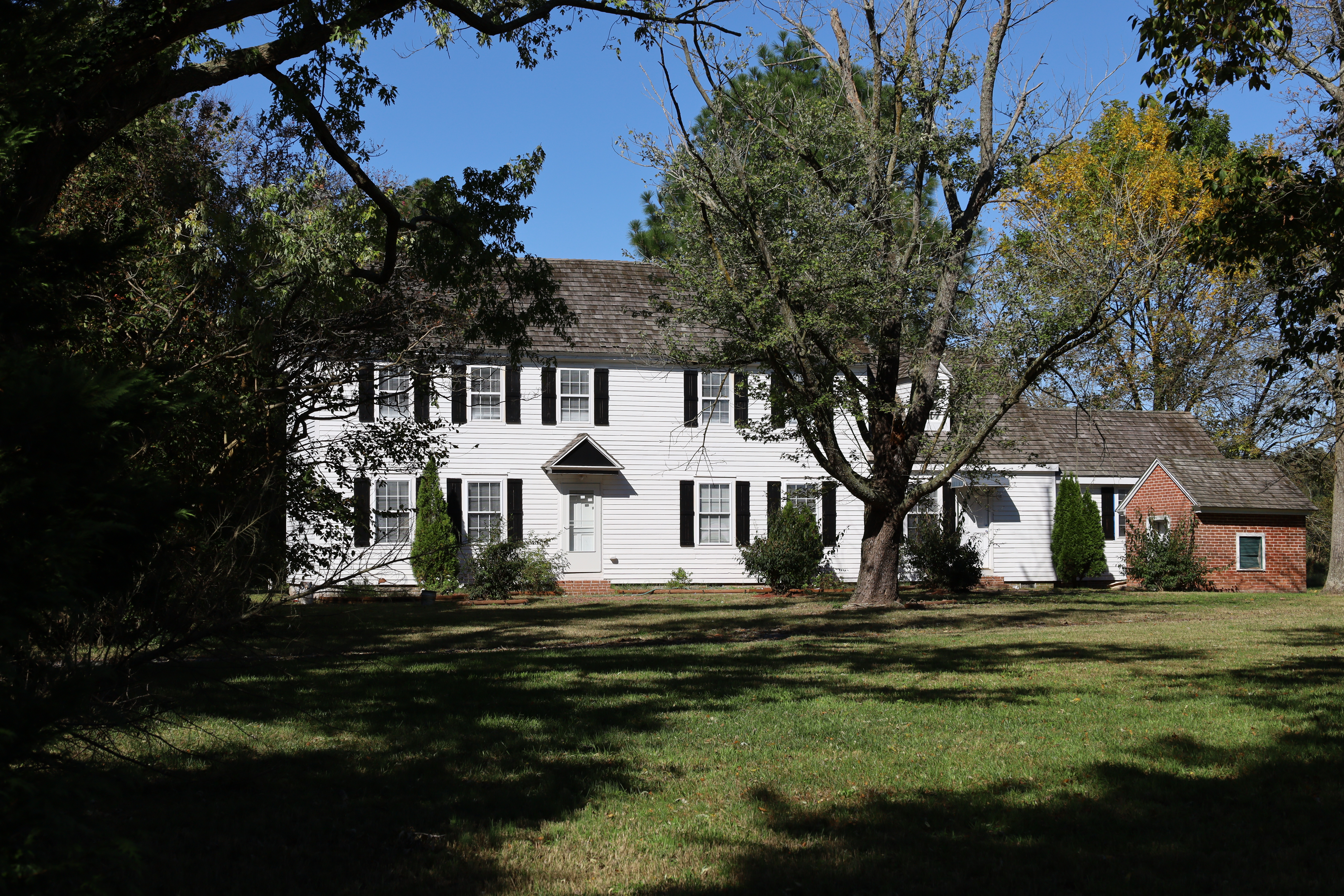

- Location within Delaware Location within the United States
- Location: South of Georgetown on Road 469, near Georgetown, Delaware
- Coordinates: 38°39′47″N 75°23′33″W
- Area: 2.3 acres (0.93 ha)
- Built: 1865
- Built by: Pepper, Eli
- Architectural style: Greek Revival, Federal
- NRHP reference No.: 79000647
- Added to NRHP: September 24, 1979

David Carlton Pepper Farm is a historic home and farm located near Georgetown, Sussex County, Delaware. It is dated to the mid-19th century, and is a two-story, six-bay, single-pile frame-and-shingle farmhouse with a 1 1/2-story side wing. It has a one-story wing attached to the rear of the 1 1/2-story side wing. A one-story kitchen wing was added to the 1 1/2-story side wing about 1935. The oldest section of the house is the 1 1/2-story side wing and dates to about 1820 and is in the late-Federal style, with the main house added in the 1840s. The newer section features Greek Revival style interior details. Also on the property are notable mid-19th century outbuildings including a milk house, privy, and smoke house; a barn, a frame granary, a log corn crib, and an extremely early Sussex County poultry house (1916).

The site was added to the National Register of Historic Places in 1979.
