= Brick Hotel =

- U.S. National Register of Historic Places
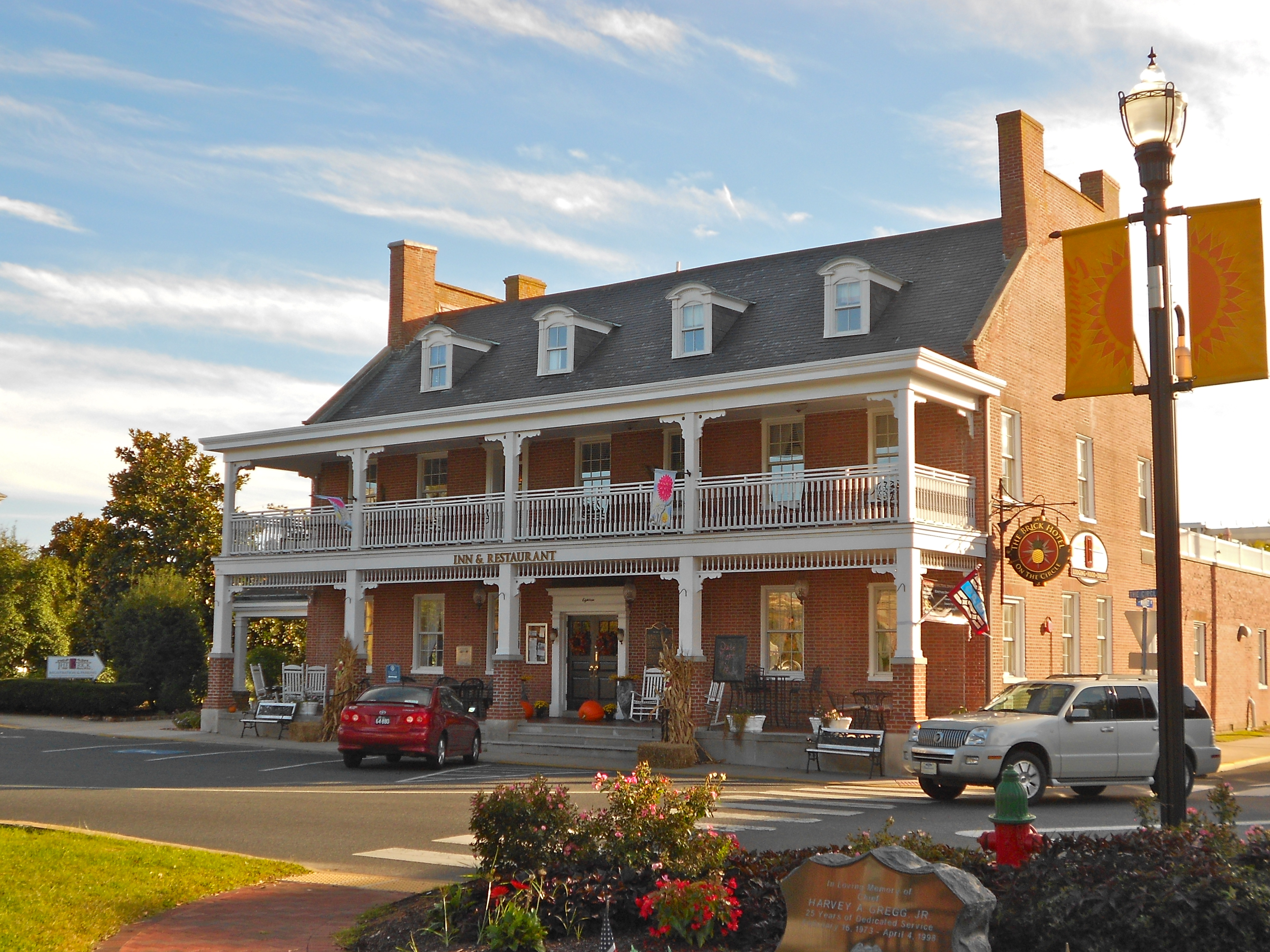

- Location within Delaware Location within the United States
- Location: The Circle, Georgetown, Delaware
- Coordinates: 38°41′23″N 75°23′13″W
- Area: less than one acre
- Built: 1836
- Built by: Layton, Joshua S.; Sipple, Caleb B.
- Architectural style: Greek Revival, Federal
- NRHP reference No.: 79000644
- Added to NRHP: November 13, 1979

Brick Hotel, also known as the Wilmington Trust Co., Georgetown Office, is a historic hotel located at Georgetown, Sussex County, Delaware. It was built in 1836, and is a 2 1/2-story, seven-bay, brick structure in a transitional Federal / Greek Revival style. It has a one-story, rear kitchen wing, and a one-story wing attached to it and dated to the 1930s. It has a slate-tiled roof, double end chimneys, and a modern Greek Revival style verandah. The exterior was altered in 1955, when it was converted from its original use as a hotel to its use as a bank building. In 2008, it was converted back to a hotel. On August 28, 2021, the Brick Hotel closed permanently, with the building having been leased for office space.

The site was added to the National Register of Historic Places in 1979.
