= Stella Pepper Gyles House =

Historic house in Delaware, United States

- U.S. National Register of Historic Places
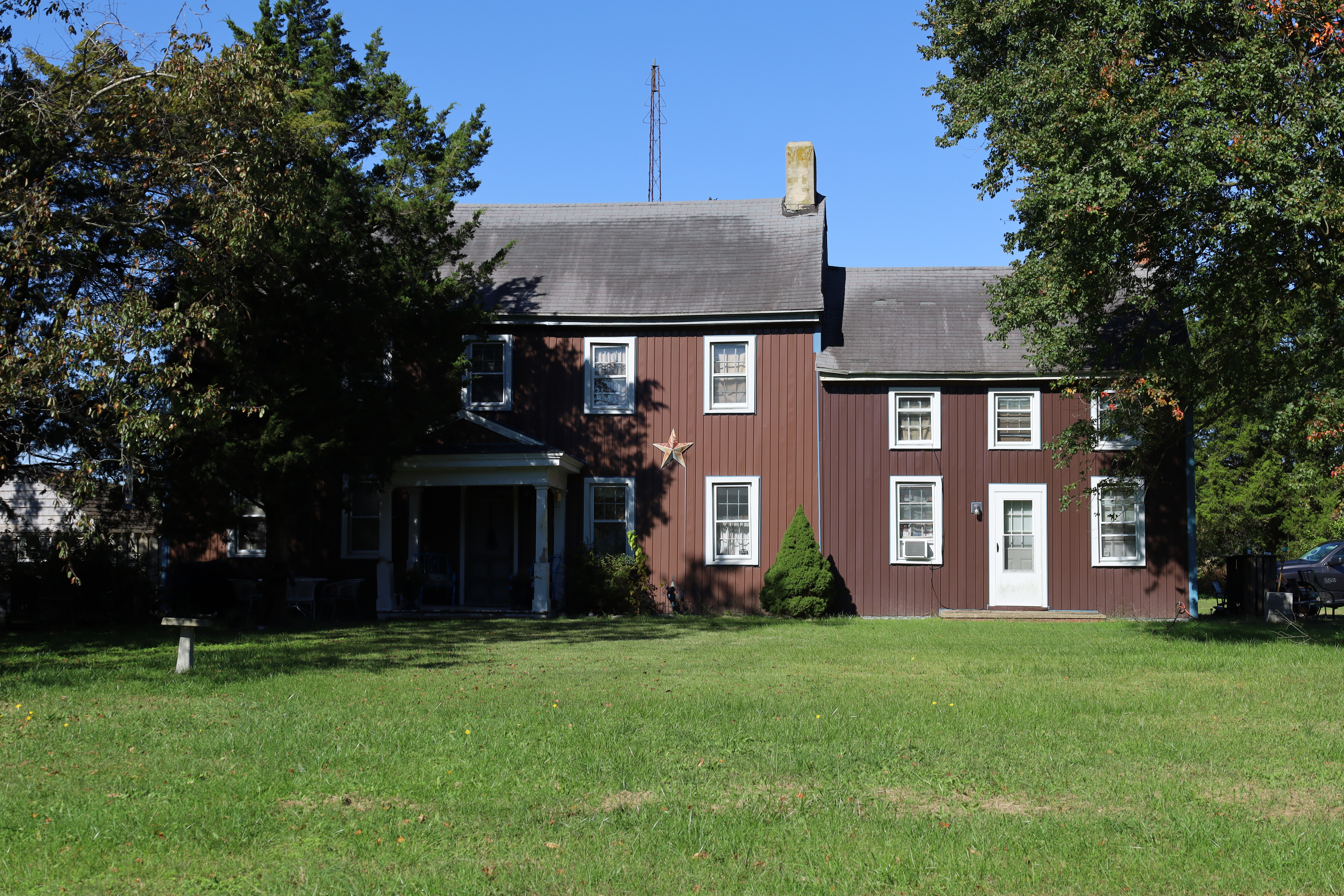

- Location within Delaware Location within the United States
- Location: Southwest of Georgetown at the Northwest corner of Delaware Roads 518 and 62, near Georgetown, Delaware
- Coordinates: 38°39′43″N 75°24′23″W
- Area: 3.5 acres (1.4 ha)
- Built by: Pepper, A.C.
- Architectural style: Greek Revival
- NRHP reference No.: 79000645
- Added to NRHP: November 13, 1979

Stella Pepper Gyles House is a historic home located near Georgetown, Sussex County, Delaware. It is dated to the mid-19th century, and is a large two-story, five-bay, single-pile frame and shingle farmhouse with a three-bay side wing. It has a small lean-to rear wing attached to the rear of the three-bay wing. At the front entrance is a one-story, one-bay pedimented porch. The house is constructed of cypress and is in a vernacular Greek Revival style. Located on the property are a notable milk house, a mid-19th century barn, and a granary.

It was added to the National Register of Historic Places in 1979.
