= Dr. John W. Messick House and Office =

Historic house in Delaware, United States

- U.S. National Register of Historic Places
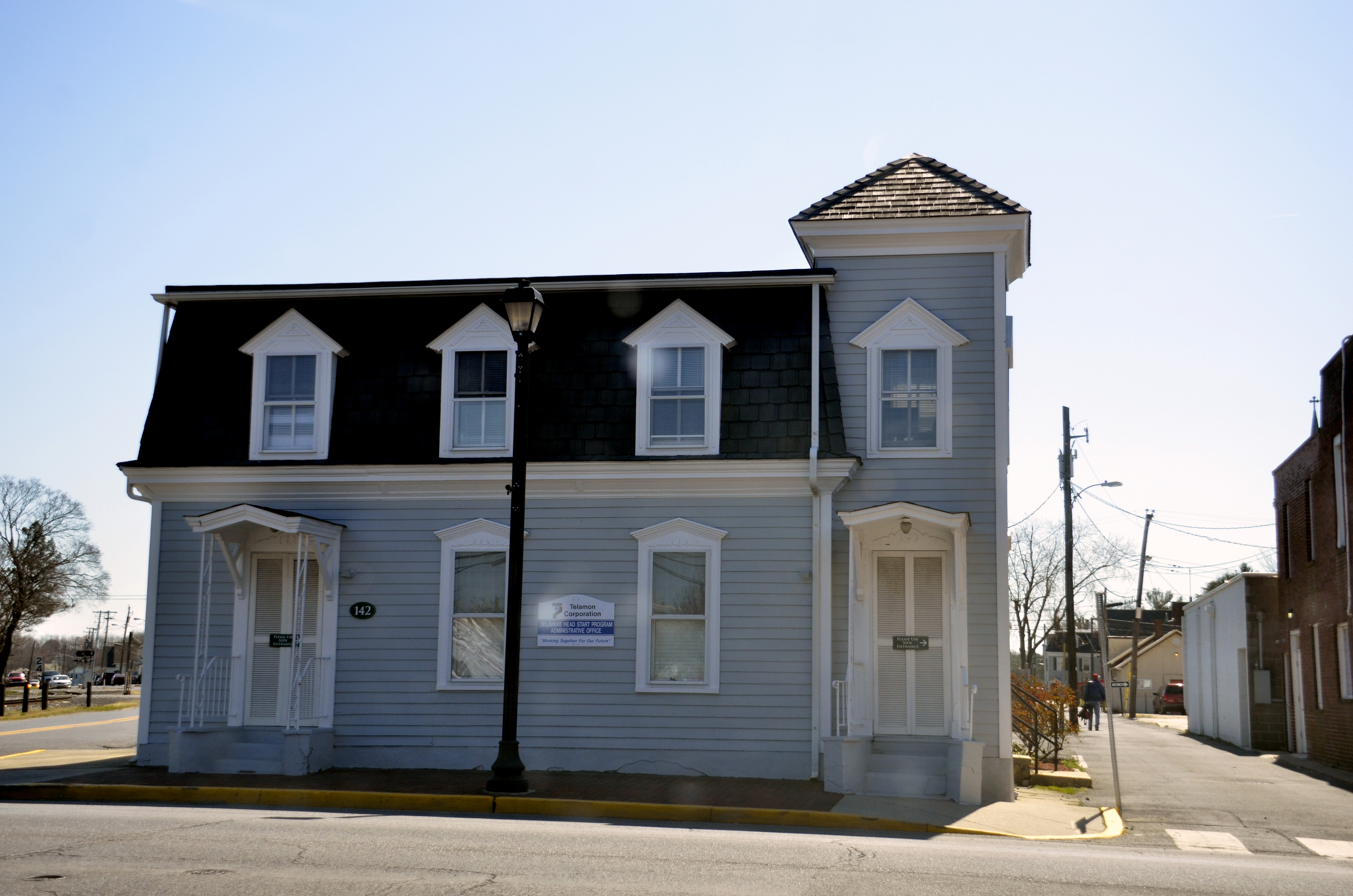

- Location within Delaware Location within the United States
- Location: 144 E. Market St., Georgetown, Delaware
- Coordinates: 38.6917°N 75.3836°W
- Area: 0.2 acres (0.081 ha)
- Built: 1876
- Architectural style: Late Gothic Revival, Second Empire, Queen Anne
- NRHP reference No.: 87001499
- Added to NRHP: September 9, 1987

Dr. John W. Messick House and Office is a historic home and office located at Georgetown, Sussex County, Delaware. It was built in 1876 and is a 1 1/2-story, three-bay, L-shaped frame dwelling with a two-story, five-bay rear wing. It has a recessed turret structure attached at the front as a fourth bay. The house is in a Late Gothic Revival style with a mansard roof in the Second Empire style.

The site was added to the National Register of Historic Places in 1987.
