= Peter S. Faucett House =

Historic house in Delaware, United States

- U.S. National Register of Historic Places
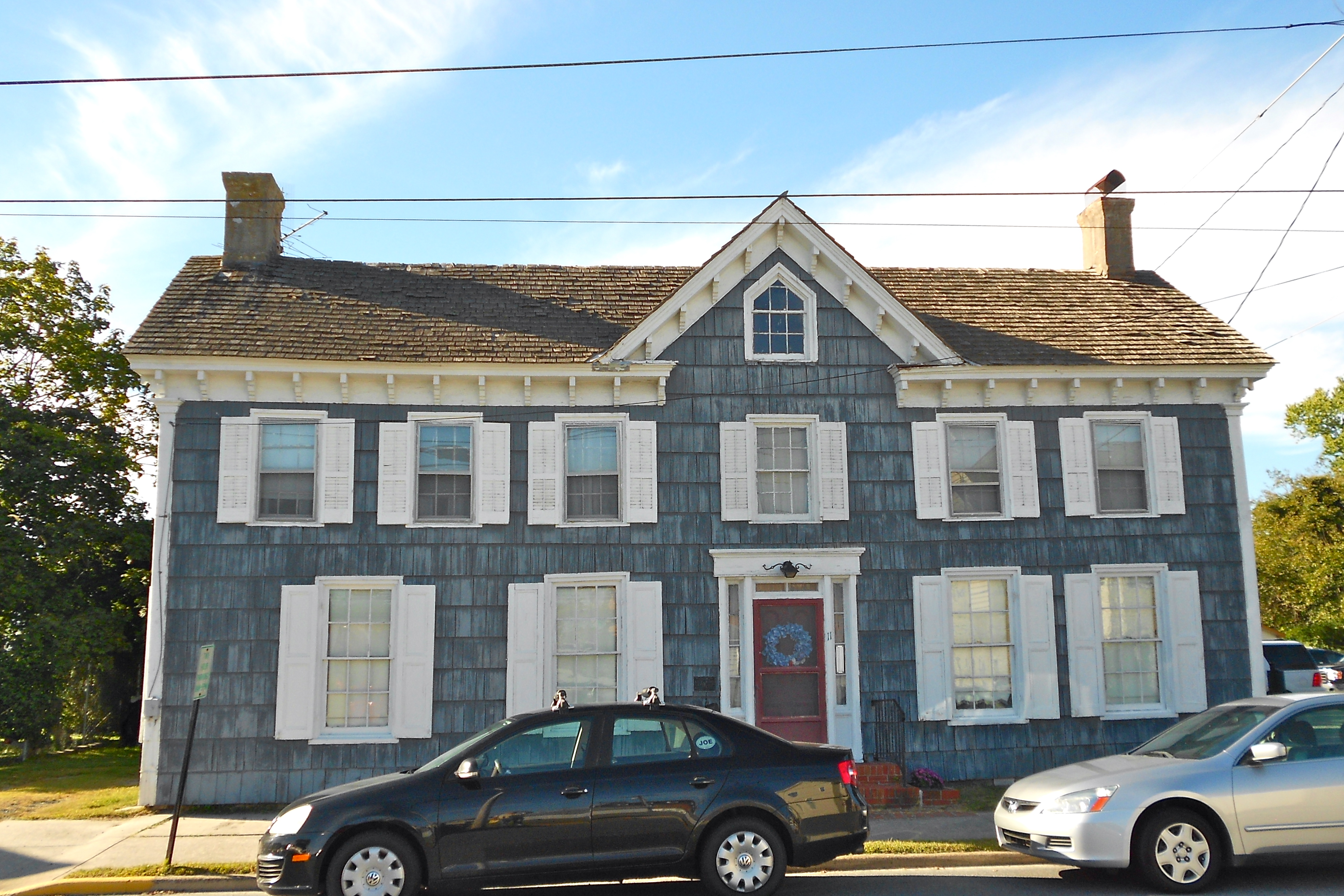

- Location within Delaware Location within the United States
- Location: W. Laurel St., Georgetown, Delaware
- Coordinates: 38°41′24″N 75°23′18″W
- Area: 0.2 acres (0.081 ha)
- Architectural style: Greek Revival, Gothic, Italianate
- NRHP reference No.: 85002006
- Added to NRHP: September 5, 1985

Peter S. Faucett House, also known as the Hitchens House, is a historic home located at Georgetown, Sussex County, Delaware. It is an early-19th century, two-story, six-bay, shingled frame dwelling in a vernacular style. It consists of two separate three-bay structures joined to form a single dwelling. It has a two-story rear ell, gable roof, and cross-gable dormer. It features a variety of Greek Revival, Italianate, and Gothic style design elements. Also on the property is a contributing frame garage, built between 1910 and 1930.

The site was added to the National Register of Historic Places in 1985.
