= St. John's Methodist Church (Georgetown, Delaware) =

Historic church in Delaware, United States

- U.S. National Register of Historic Places
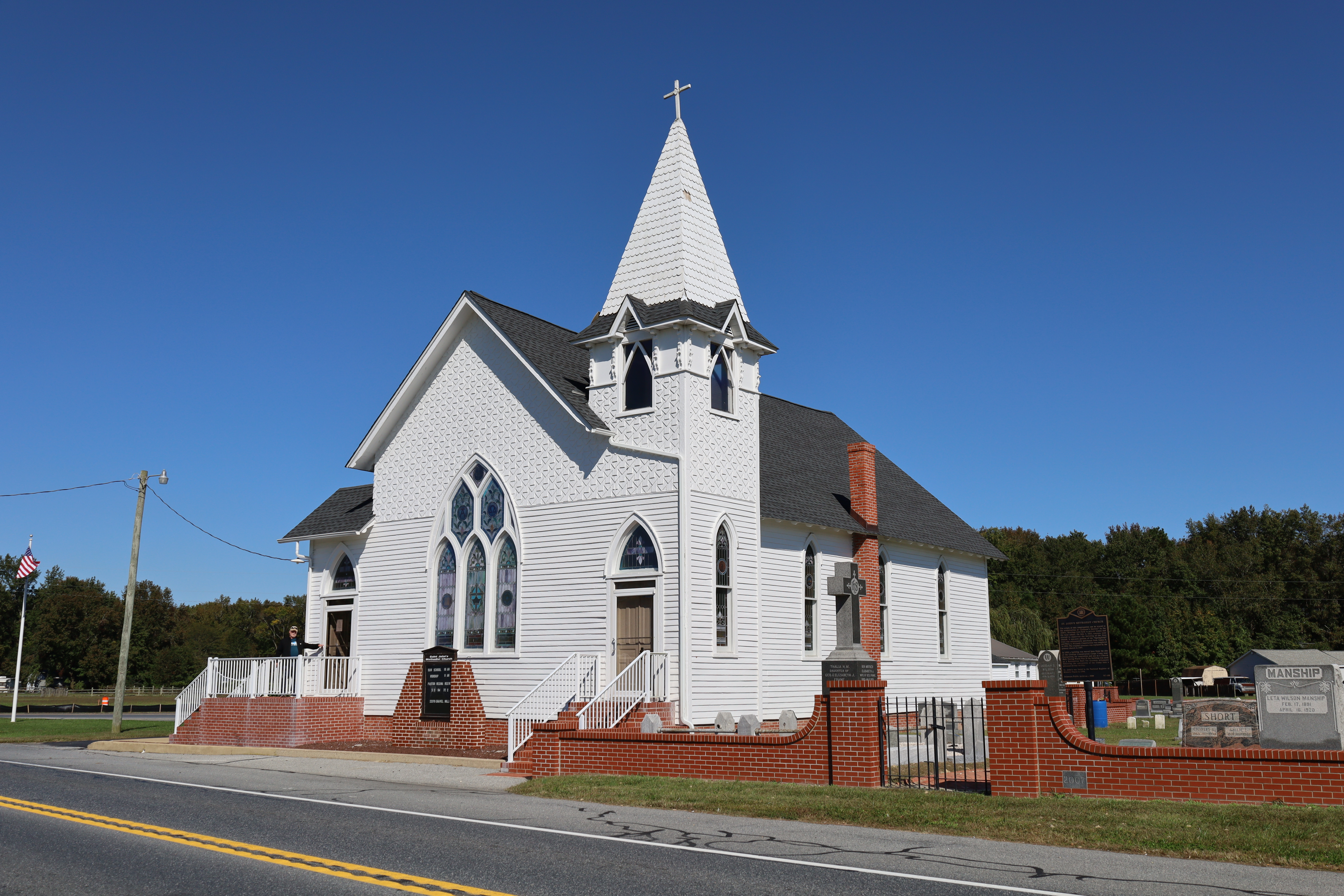

- Location within Delaware Location within the United States
- Location: Springfield Crossroads, junction of Delaware Route 30 and Road 47, Georgetown, Delaware
- Coordinates: 38°40′54″N 75°18′28″W
- Area: 1.8 acres (0.73 ha)
- Architectural style: Gothic Revival
- NRHP reference No.: 90001071
- Added to NRHP: July 12, 1990

St. John's Methodist Church is a historic Methodist church located at Springfield Crossroads near Georgetown, Sussex County, Delaware. It was built in 1907, and is a one-story, frame church building sheathed in weatherboard in the Gothic Revival style. It sits on a raised brick foundation, has a steeply pitched gable roof, lancet windows, and features a two-story bell tower with steeple. The property also includes the church hall, which was originally constructed at the Civilian Conservation Corps Camp near Georgetown. It was moved to the property in 1949, and subsequently renovated. Adjacent to the church is the church cemetery, with burials dating to 1853.

The site was added to the National Register of Historic Places in 1990.
