= Gardiner Wright Mansion =

Historic house in Delaware, United States

- U.S. National Register of Historic Places
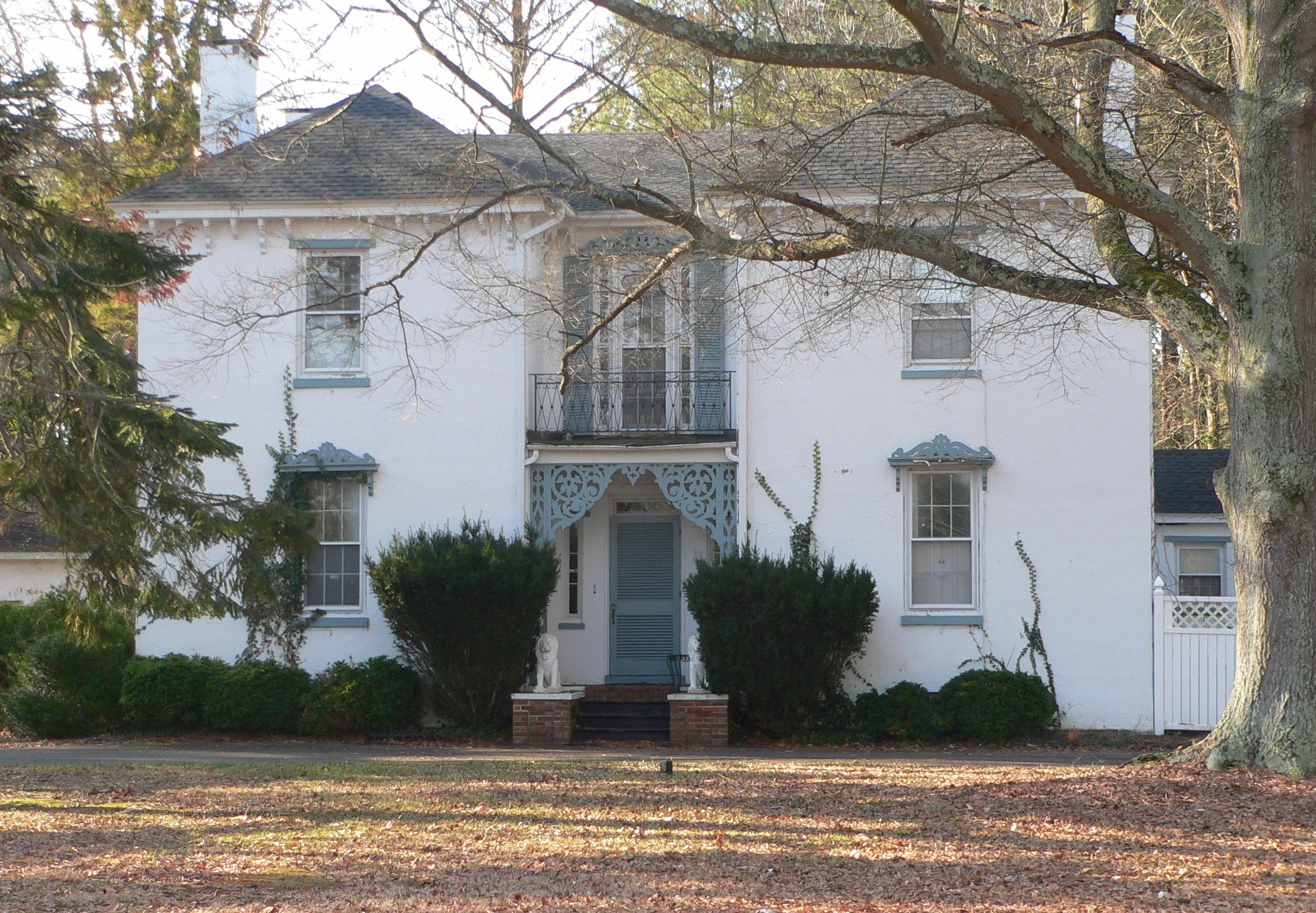

- Location within Delaware Location within the United States
- Location: 228 S. Front St, Georgetown, Delaware
- Coordinates: 38.685272°N 75.383223°W
- Area: 2.1 acres (0.85 ha)
- Built: 1841
- Architectural style: Second Empire, Italianate, Regency
- NRHP reference No.: 79000650
- Added to NRHP: November 15, 1979

Gardiner Wright Mansion, also known as The Marsh House, is a historic regency mansion in Georgetown, Sussex County, Delaware. It was built in 1841, and is a two-story stuccoed brick dwelling. The plan consists of two parallel rectangular sections, with a two-story brick central hall running between them. It was extensively renovated in the late-1940s. On the property are a contributing wood shed and two-level milk house.

The site was added to the National Register of Historic Places in 1979.
