= Judge's House and Law Office =

Historic house in Delaware, United States

- U.S. National Register of Historic Places
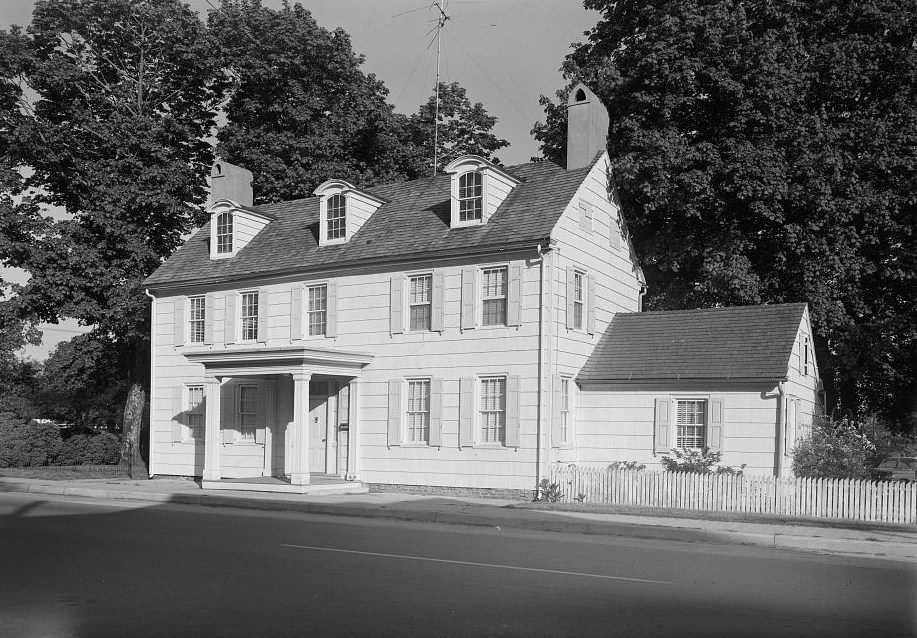
- Judge's House and Law Office, HABS Photo, June 1960

- Location within Delaware Location within the United States
- Location: 100 and 104 W. Market St, Georgetown, Delaware
- Coordinates: 38°41′21″N 75°23′17″W
- Area: less than one acre
- Built: 1810
- Built by: Robinson, Justice Peter
- Architectural style: Federal, Greek Revival
- NRHP reference No.: 79000646
- Added to NRHP: November 13, 1979

Judge's House and Law Office is a historic home and office located at Georgetown, Sussex County, Delaware. The original structure was built by Justice Peter Robinson about 1810, as a 2 1/2-story, single pile, Federal style dwelling with a one-story, two bay southwest wing and one-story, three bay rear wing. The southwest wing was later raised in the 1820s to 2 1/2 stories and rear wing raised to 2-stories. In the 1840s, the interior was renovated in the Greek Revival style and the house shingled in cypress. The office was built in 1809, and is a one-story, cypress-shingled frame building, three bays wide, with a gable roof and rear wing.

The site was added to the National Register of Historic Places in 1979.
