= Delaware Confederate Monument =

Monument in Georgetown, Delaware, U.S.

- United States
- For Delawareans, both soldiers and civilians, who supported the Confederate war effort
- Established: 2007
- Location: 38°40′21″N 75°22′36″W; Grounds of the Georgetown Historical Society near Georgetown, Delaware

The Delaware Confederate Monument is a private monument in Georgetown, Delaware built on the grounds of the Georgetown Historical Society, unveiled in 2007. The granite monument features a Confederate battle flag and the names of more than 95 Delawareans, both soldiers and civilians, who supported the Confederate war effort, including former Delaware Governor William H. H. Ross. This is the only Confederate monument in Delaware because it was a border state that never left the Union.

== History ==
The monument was erected in 2007 after the Sons of Confederate Veterans in Delaware, known as the Delaware Grays, and the United Daughters of the Confederacy commissioned it to commemorate Delawareans that supported the Confederate States of America during the American Civil War. Additional names were often added to the memorial. In the 2010s, calls were made for the Confederate flag to be removed from the memorial, including from the NAACP who demanded the museum's state funding be cut. The Governor of Delaware, John Carney also supported removal stating "the Confederate flag belongs in a museum, not flying over one". The Delaware Grays defended it as being there to honor Confederate veterans.

In 2019, the Georgetown Historical Society lost state funding from the Delaware General Assembly on the grounds of the continued flying of the Confederate flag at the monument. Georgetown Town Council in Sussex County, where the monument is located, voted to continue to fund the society and museum. The monument is not illuminated.

== See also ==
- List of Confederate monuments and memorials
