= Thomas Sipple House =

Historic house in Delaware, United States

- U.S. National Register of Historic Places
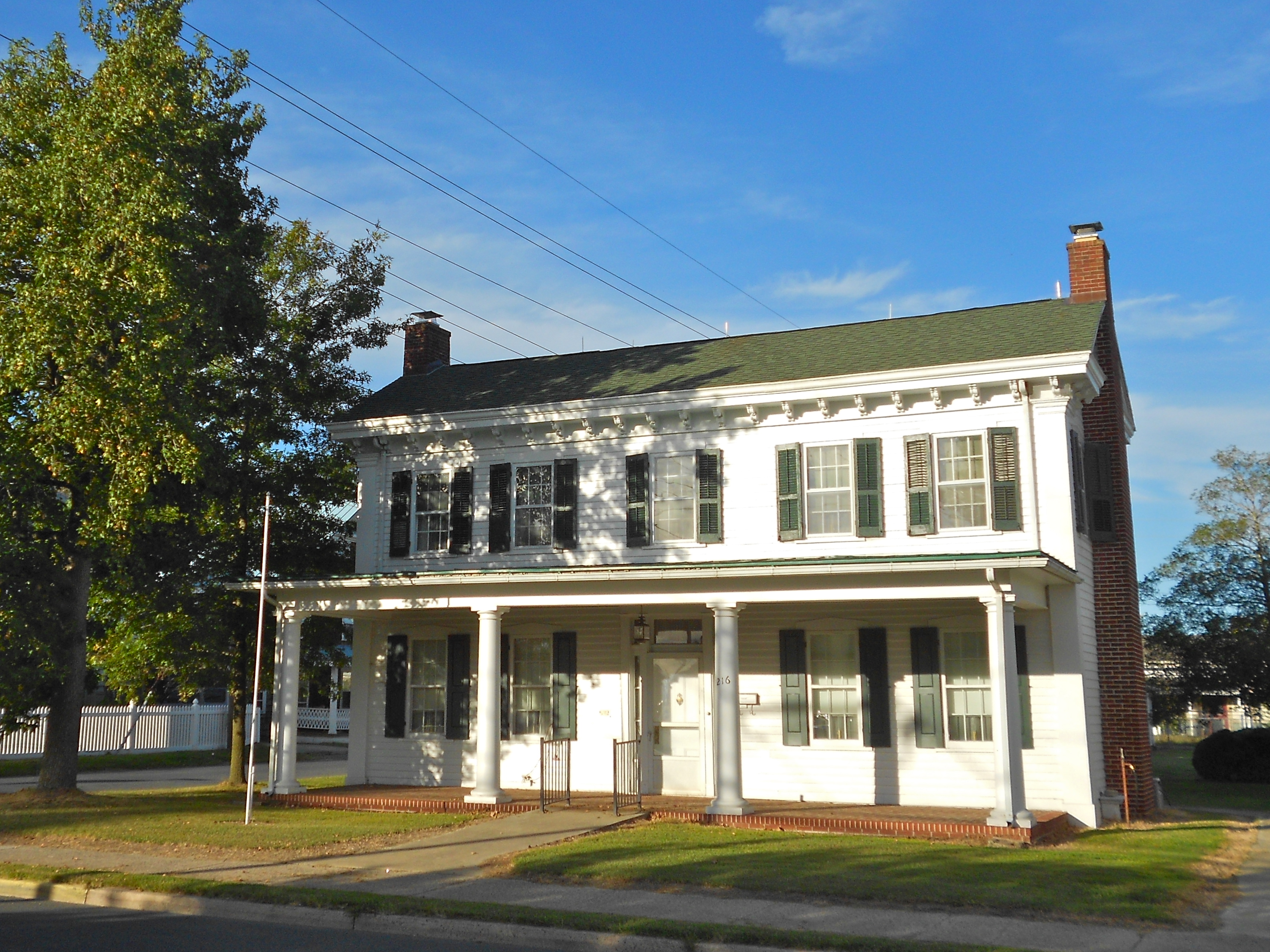
- House in 2013

- Location within Delaware Location within the United States
- Location: N. Bedford & New Sts., Georgetown, Delaware
- Coordinates: 38°41′34″N 75°23′22″W
- Area: 0.3 acres (0.12 ha)
- Built: 1861
- Built by: Sipple, Thomas
- Architectural style: Greek Revival, Italianate
- NRHP reference No.: 85002007
- Added to NRHP: September 5, 1985

Thomas Sipple House, also known as the Chipman House and Boxwood Manor, is a historic home located at Georgetown, Sussex County, Delaware. It was built in 1861, and is a two-story, five-bay, single pile frame dwelling with a two-story rear ell. It sits on a brick foundation and has a low-pitched gable roof. The house was modified in 1912, to enclose a rear porch, add a sleeping porch, and add a two-story porch connecting the house to two outbuildings. It features Greek Revival and Italianate style design elements.

The site was added to the National Register of Historic Places in 1985.
