= Georgetown Coal Gasification Plant =

- U.S. National Register of Historic Places
- Location within Delaware Location within the United States
- Location: N. Railroad Ave., Georgetown, Delaware
- Coordinates: 38°41′41″N 75°23′16″W
- Area: 0.3 acres (0.12 ha)
- Built: 1880s
- Demolished: 1960-1980 (partial). After 1985, before 2005 (full)
- NRHP reference No.: 85002696
- Added to NRHP: September 30, 1985

Georgetown Coal Gasification Plant, also known as the Georgetown Service and Gas Company, is a historic coal gasification plant located at Georgetown, Sussex County, Delaware. It was built in the late-19th century, and is a rectangular one-story, three bay by three bay brick structure measuring 40 feet by 25 feet. It has a gable roof with a smaller gable roofed ventilator. Also on the property is a small brick gable roofed brick building measuring 8 feet by 10 feet; a small, square concrete building; a large, cylindrical "surge tank;" 500-gallon bottled-gas tank; and a covered pit for impurities. The complex was privately owned and developed starting in the 1880s to provide metered gas for domestic lighting, town street lights, municipal and domestic uses. The coal gasification process was discontinued in the 1940s.

The site was added to the National Register of Historic Places in 1985. It is listed on the Delaware Cultural and Historic Resources GIS system as destroyed or demolished.
