= McColley's Chapel =

Historic church in Delaware, United States

- U.S. National Register of Historic Places
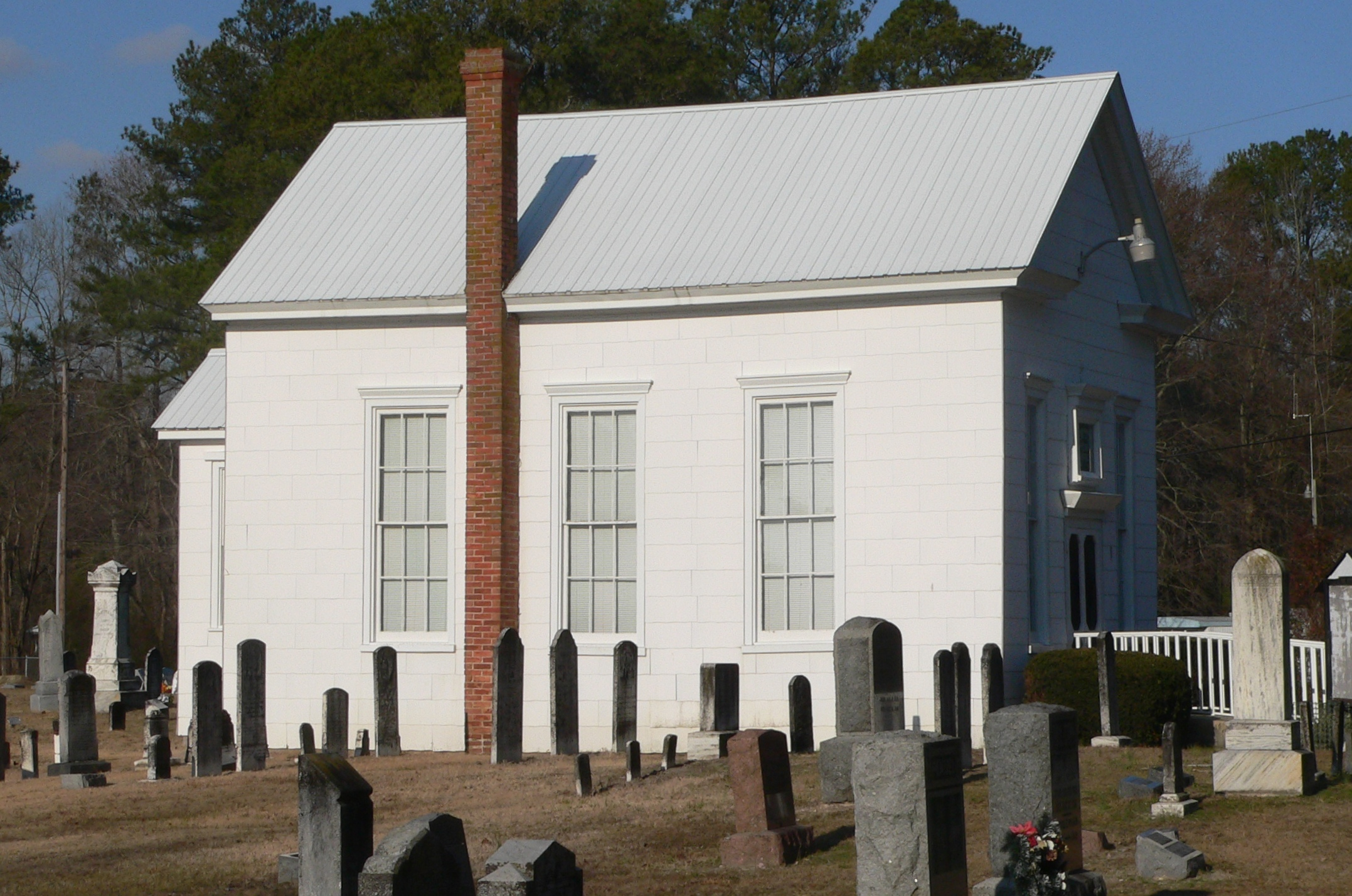

- Location within Delaware Location within the United States
- Location: 18168 Redden Road, north of Georgetown
- Coordinates: 38°44′34.1″N 75°25′56.3″W
- NRHP reference No.: 11000859
- Added to NRHP: November 30, 2011

McColley's Chapel is a Methodist chapel located between Ellendale and Georgetown, Delaware. It was listed on the National Register of Historic Places on November 30, 2011.

== Description ==
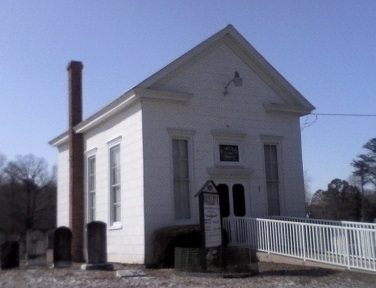
Front of McColleys Chapel in Sussex County, Delaware in February 2015

The property consists of a single-story church facing east-northeast, surrounded by a cemetery. The church proper is a simple wood-framed gabled structure covered in asphalt shingles, with a chancel projecting from the back and a brick chimney applied to the south side. The facade features an open pediment in the gable and a pair of windows flanking the central entrance, with a wooden sign over the door; each side also has three tall, narrow double-hung windows, with a smaller window on either side of the chancel. The interior is fitted with box pews flanking a center aisle, and a pulpit and altar, also aligned with the center line of the building. The chancel opening has plain casing surmounted by a pediment; the back wall of the altar area is ornamented by column casing supporting a dentil architrave.

The cemetery contains burials from 1860 up to 2007. Some plots are surrounded by iron railings; older tombstones are generally of marble and are hard to read. Many of the stones have elaborate low relief, but some stone are simple obelisks.

== History ==
It is the second church building on land donated by James Rudden in 1857. The first church was built by Trustan P. McColley and was named after him; it was the oldest Methodist church in Georgetown Hundred. This building fell into disrepair and was destroyed in a fire sometime in the late 1890s. The second building was built in 1898. As of 2013 the church was used for services and was under the Peninsula-Delaware Conference of the United Methodist Church.
