= Georgetown, Delaware =

Town and county seat in Delaware, US

- Town
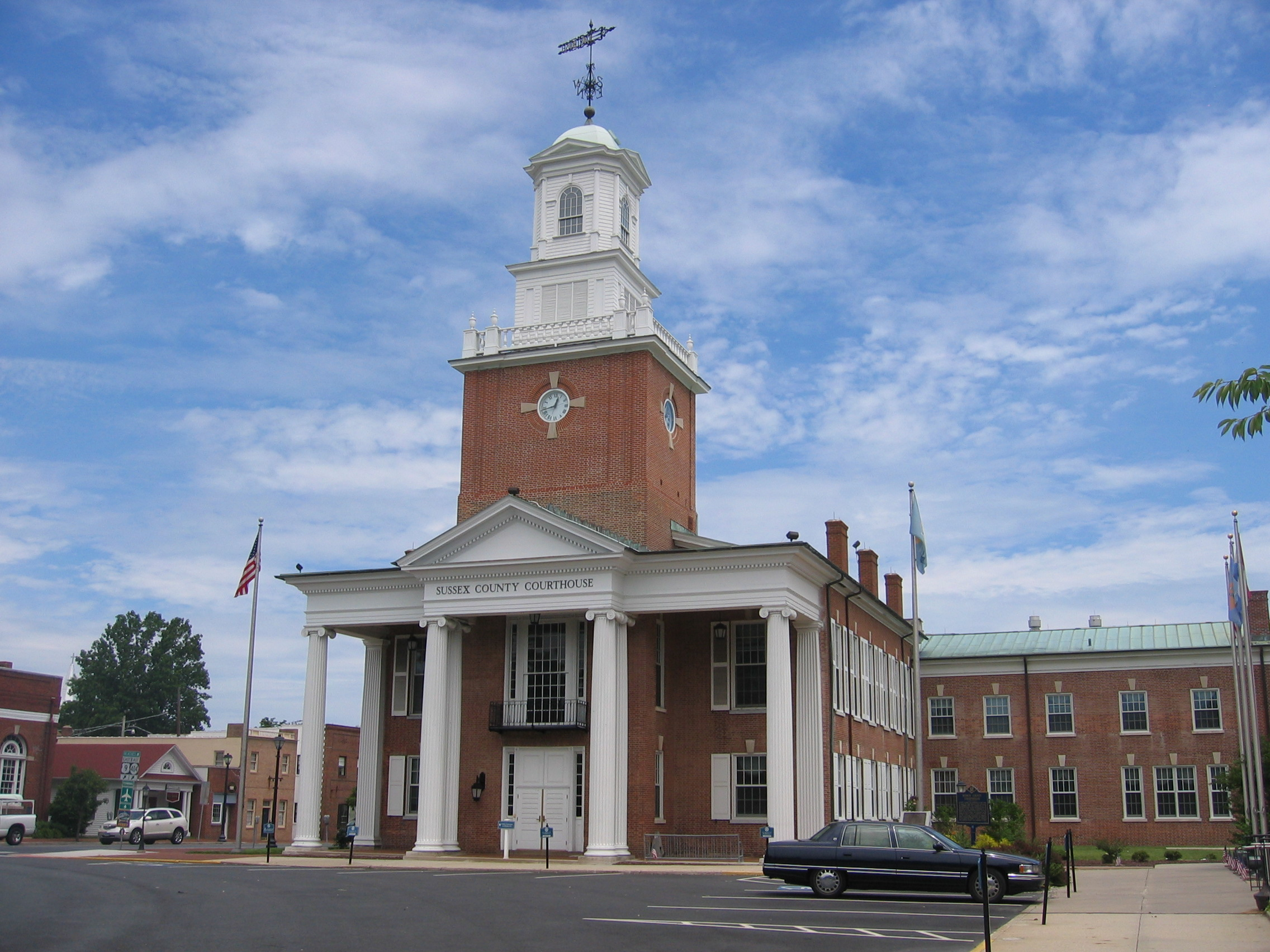
- Sussex County Courthouse and the Circle

- Flag Seal

- Location of Georgetown in Sussex County, Delaware.

- Location within the state of Delaware Georgetown (the United States)
- Coordinates: 38°41′24″N 75°23′08″W
- Country: United States
- State: Delaware
- County: Sussex
- Founded: 1791

Government
  - Mayor: William E. West
  - Town Council Members: Christina Diaz-Malone (Ward 1), Tony Neal (Ward 2), Eric Evans (Ward 3), Penuel Barrett (Ward 4)
  - Town Manager: Eugene S. Dvornick, Jr.
  - Police Chief: Ralph W. Holm, Jr.

Area
  - Total: 5.02 sq mi (13.01 km^{2})
  - Land: 5.02 sq mi (13.01 km^{2})
  - Water: 0 sq mi (0.00 km^{2})
- Elevation: 52 ft (16 m)

Population (2020)
  - Total: 7,134
  - Density: 1,421/sq mi (548.5/km^{2})
- Time zone: UTC−5 (Eastern (EST))
  - Summer (DST): UTC−4 (EDT)
- ZIP Code: 19947
- Area code: 302
- FIPS code: 10-29090
- GNIS feature ID: 213993
- Website: www.georgetowndel.com

Georgetown is a town in and the county seat of Sussex County, Delaware, United States. As of the 2020 census, Georgetown had a population of 7,134.

Georgetown is part of the Salisbury, Maryland-Delaware Metropolitan Statistical Area.

== History ==
=== Second county seat ===
Lewes, sited on the Delaware Bay, was designated as the first county seat. It was the first colony in Delaware, founded by the Dutch in 1631, and it remained the only significant European settlement in the region for some time. When English colonist William Penn organized the three southern counties of Pennsylvania, which are now Delaware, Lewes was the natural choice for the location of the Sussex County's Seat of Justice.

Sussex County was not well defined until after 1760, following resolution of a dispute between William Penn's family and Frederick Calvert, 6th Baron Baltimore after intervention from the Crown. This dispute over borders had delayed discussion over the location of a county seat. Earlier Charles Calvert, 5th Baron Baltimore had argued that the county ended with Lewes, while Penn's sons stated it continued into Fenwick Island, which it now does. The Mason–Dixon line was surveyed as part the agreement between the Penns and Lord Baltimore, and it has since defined the western and southern border of the county. Georgetown, located more centrally in the county, was later designated as its seat for court.

=== Founding of Georgetown ===
Lewes continued to serve as the county seat throughout much of the 18th century, although it was inconvenient for the growing population to the west; some persons had to travel more than a day over the poor roads to reach the town to conduct county business. After petitioning by western citizens of the county to the Delaware General Assembly, a law was passed on January 29, 1791, to centralize the location of the county seat. At the time, the land in central Sussex County was for the most part swampy and uninhabited. The county government hired ten commissioners to purchase land, build a courthouse and jail, and sell lots in an area at "James Pettyjohn's old field or about a mile from where Ebenezer Pettyjohn now lives," as the original order states, to encourage related development.

On May 9, 1791, the commissioners, under the leadership of the Delaware State Senator George Mitchell, purchased 76 acres (310,000 m^{2}) for a townsite. Commissioner Rhodes Shankland began the survey by laying out "a spacious square of 100 yards each way." Eventually Georgetown was laid out in a circle one mile in diameter and centered around the original square surveyed by Shankland. The area within this circle is now listed as a historic district on the National Register of Historic Places. The new location proved better as an administrative center; Georgetown is still said to be "sixteen miles from everywhere" in Sussex County.

The County Courthouse and Jail were built in the southeastern section of the town circle. Given this progress, the Seat of Justice was officially moved on October 26, 1791. The new community was named Georgetown in honor of the lead commissioner George Mitchell. Lots, measuring 60 by 120-foot, were surveyed and sold to give a return to the State's investment.

=== Later history ===
Because of Delaware's status as a border state during the Civil War, men enlisted on both sides of the war, with some fighting for the Union and others for the Confederates. The town and even some of its prominent families were divided by these split loyalties.

In 2007, a monument commemorating Sussex County Confederates and featuring the Confederate Battle Flag was constructed and installed at the Marvel Museum in Georgetown.

As of 2022, the town council continues to fund a museum that flies the Confederate battle flag. The museum had lost state funding in 2019.

== Culture ==
Since the mid 20th century, the two most intense industries in Georgetown have been the Sussex County Courts and the raising and processing of chickens, largely grown on area farms under contract to a processor such as Perdue Farms which has a large chicken processing plant in Georgetown. It has attracted numerous immigrants from Haiti and Guatemala as workers, stimulating growth of the population and changing the town's demographics. Georgetown has a more diverse population than might be expected in a small Delaware inland town. Some residents speak Haitian French or Creole, while many more have a primary language of Spanish, in addition to those whose first language is English. In 2000 slightly more than one-third of the population was ethnic Hispanic and one-fifth was African American (including Haitians).

Georgetown is the home of WZBH radio and the Georgetown Speedway. The latter attracts attendees from miles around during race season.

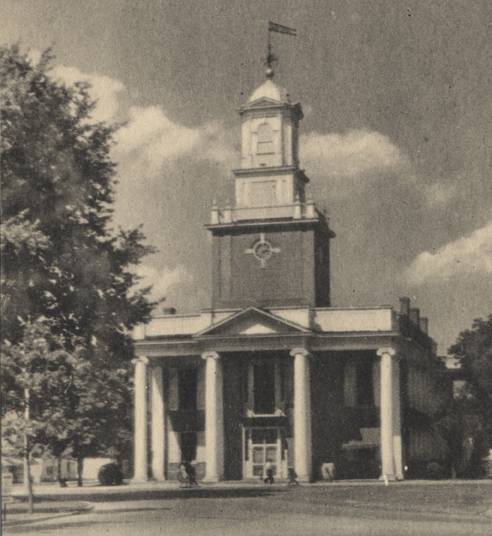
Sussex County Courthouse in Georgetown, early 20th century

=== Return Day ===
Every two years, Georgetown hosts Return Day, a half-day-long parade and festival two days after Election Day. It stems from colonial days, when the public would congregate in Georgetown two days after the election to hear the results (because it would take that long to deliver the results to the courthouse by horseback from the state capital in Dover, Delaware). The winners of that year's elections parade in horse-drawn carriages around The Circle. Together with the losers and the chairs of the county's political parties, they ceremonially "bury the hatchet" in a tub of sand. The afternoon of Return Day is a holiday for county and state workers in Sussex County. The day's events are marked by a traditional ox feast, and the beginning of the next round of campaigns.

== Architecture ==
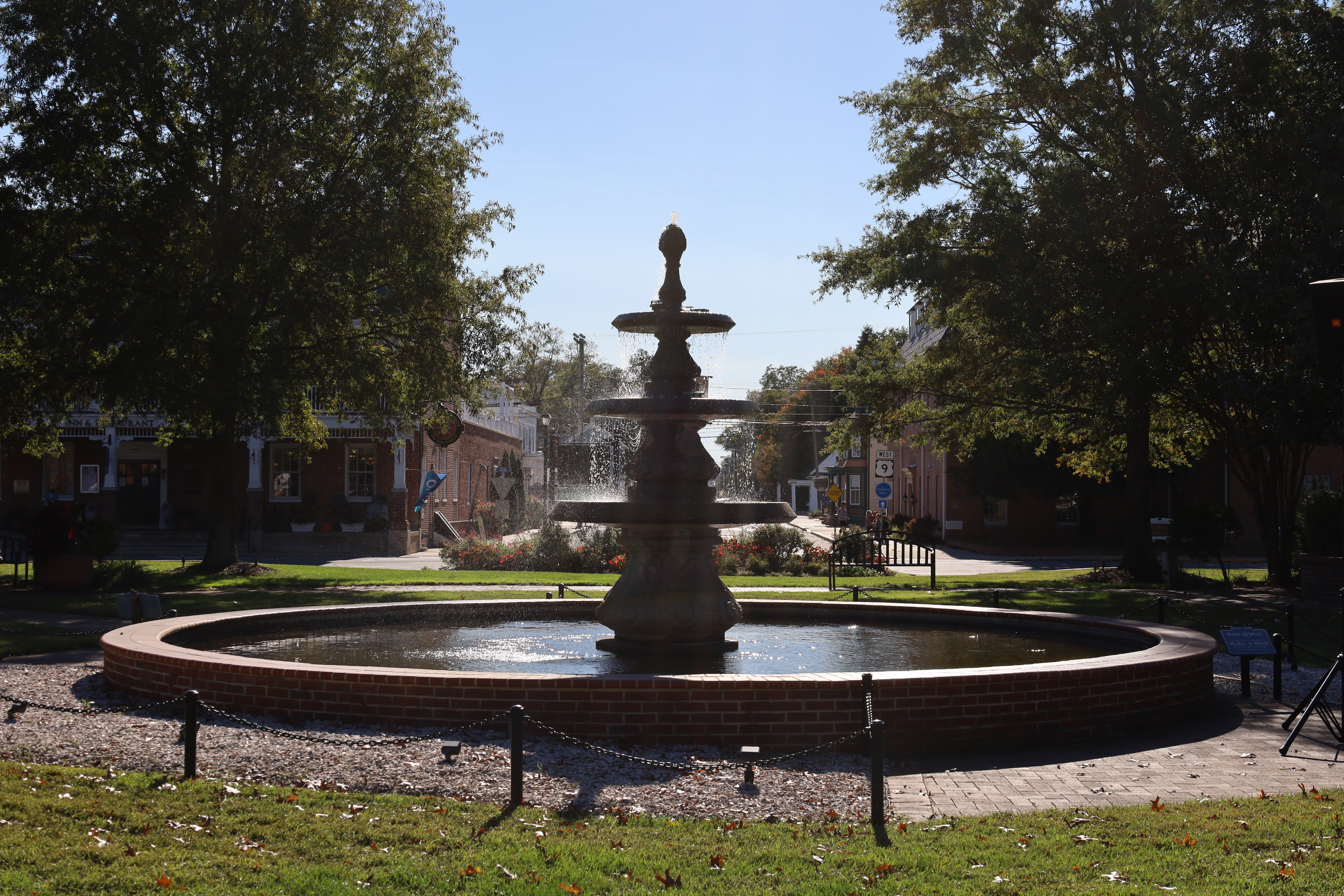
Fountain at the center of the Circle

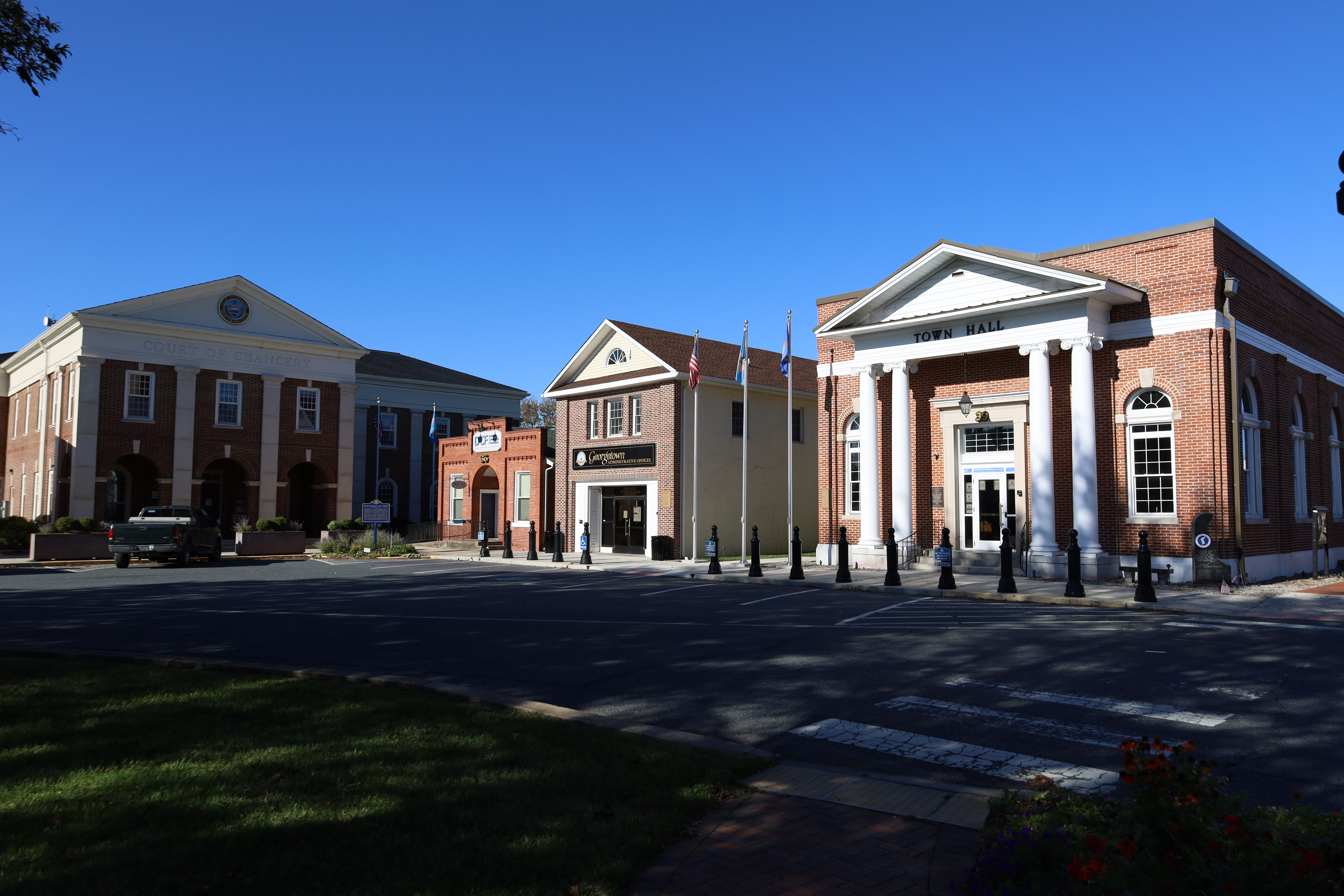
Buildings on the Circle including the Court of Chancery and Town Hall

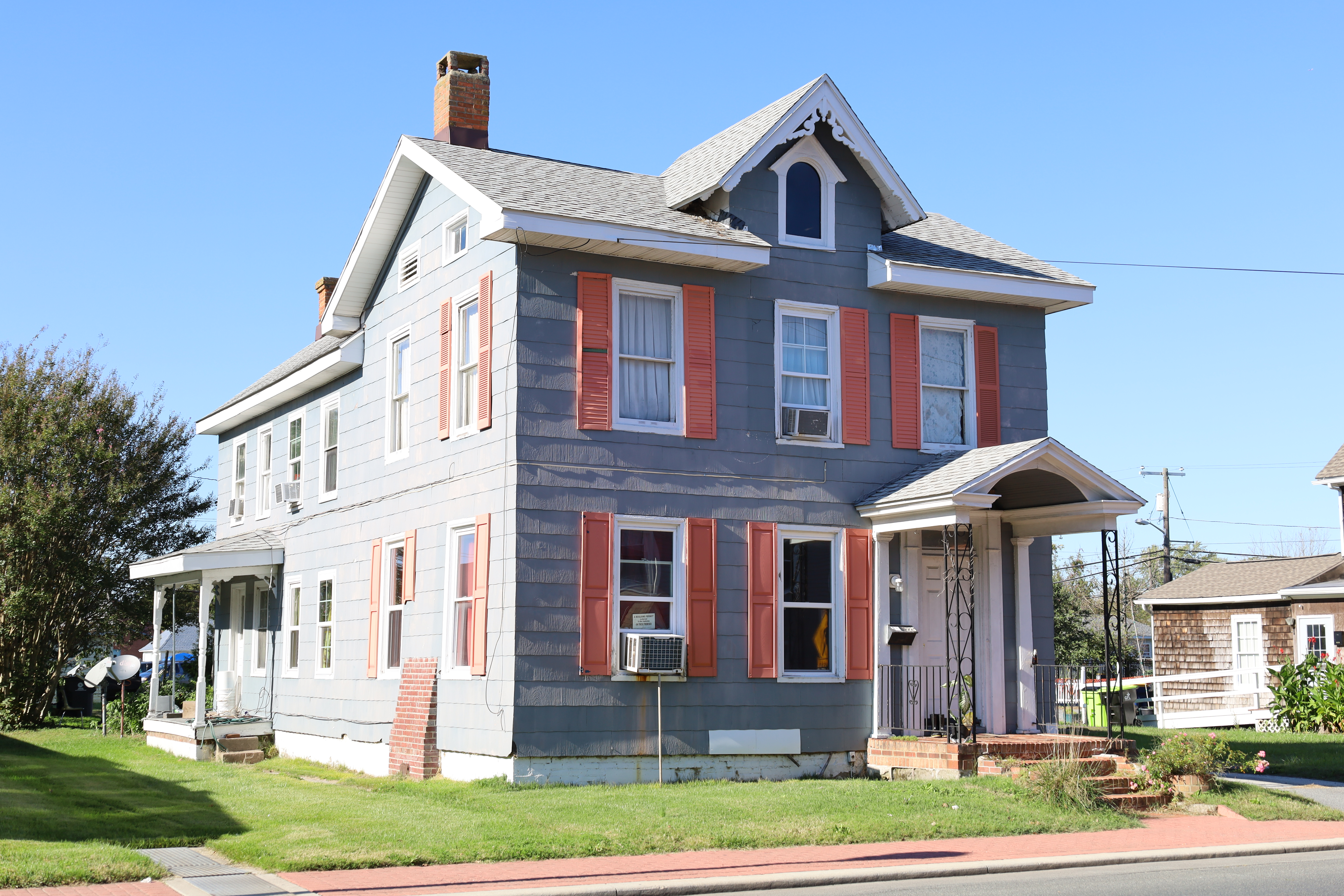
Building on Market Street

Georgetown is unusual among Delaware municipalities as the town was constructed around a circle, instead of the more traditional park square. Located at "The Circle" are the Town Hall, state and county buildings, and the historic Sussex County Courthouse. The original Courthouse was replaced by the current structure, which was built in 1837 on South Bedford Street. It was restored in 1976 and is managed by the Georgetown Historical Society. Lawyers' offices, the newer Court of Chancery and Family Court buildings, a bank, and the Brick Hotel, recently renovated into offices, also line the Circle. This layout is similar to that found in Annapolis, Maryland. The center of Georgetown's circle is a small green park with a fountain. Georgetown's oldest church, St. Paul's Episcopal Church, was constructed in 1844 and remodeled in 1881 in the early Victorian Gothic style; its congregation organized in 1794, shortly after the close of the American Revolutionary War. It is listed on the National Register of Historic Places (NRHP).

Other recognized historic properties are the Joseph T. Adams House, Brick Hotel, Peter S. Faucett House, First Broiler House, Georgetown Coal Gasification Plant, Stella Pepper Gyles House, Judge's House and Law Office, Dr. John W. Messick House and Office, Old Sussex County Courthouse, David Carlton Pepper Farm, Redden Forest Lodge, Forester's House and Stable, Richards Mansion, St. John's Methodist Church, Short Homestead, Thomas Sipple House, Sussex County Courthouse and the Circle, Gardiner Wright Mansion and McColley's Chapel, all listed on the NRHP.

== Geography ==
Georgetown is located at 38°41′24″N 75°23′08″W (38.6901134, –75.3854728).

According to the United States Census Bureau, the town has a total area of 4.1 square miles (11 km^{2}), all land.

=== Climate ===
Climate data for Georgetown, Delaware (Delaware Coastal Airport), 1991–2020 normals, extremes 1945–present
Month	Jan	Feb	Mar	Apr	May	Jun	Jul	Aug	Sep	Oct	Nov	Dec	Year
Record high °F (°C)	77 (25)	77 (25)	88 (31)	94 (34)	98 (37)	101 (38)	104 (40)	100 (38)	98 (37)	96 (36)	86 (30)	77 (25)	104 (40)
Mean maximum °F (°C)	67.6 (19.8)	67.8 (19.9)	76.4 (24.7)	84.6 (29.2)	90.3 (32.4)	94.4 (34.7)	97.3 (36.3)	94.2 (34.6)	90.9 (32.7)	84.3 (29.1)	75.6 (24.2)	68.9 (20.5)	98.0 (36.7)
Mean daily maximum °F (°C)	45.2 (7.3)	47.8 (8.8)	55.2 (12.9)	66.3 (19.1)	74.5 (23.6)	83.1 (28.4)	87.7 (30.9)	85.7 (29.8)	79.5 (26.4)	69.3 (20.7)	58.7 (14.8)	49.9 (9.9)	66.9 (19.4)
Daily mean °F (°C)	36.9 (2.7)	38.9 (3.8)	45.8 (7.7)	55.8 (13.2)	64.5 (18.1)	73.6 (23.1)	78.6 (25.9)	76.7 (24.8)	70.3 (21.3)	59.3 (15.2)	49.2 (9.6)	41.3 (5.2)	57.6 (14.2)
Mean daily minimum °F (°C)	28.6 (−1.9)	30.0 (−1.1)	36.3 (2.4)	45.3 (7.4)	54.5 (12.5)	64.0 (17.8)	69.5 (20.8)	67.7 (19.8)	61.2 (16.2)	49.4 (9.7)	39.6 (4.2)	32.7 (0.4)	48.2 (9.0)
Mean minimum °F (°C)	9.1 (−12.7)	12.9 (−10.6)	19.9 (−6.7)	29.9 (−1.2)	39.0 (3.9)	49.0 (9.4)	57.7 (14.3)	55.8 (13.2)	46.3 (7.9)	32.8 (0.4)	23.8 (−4.6)	17.0 (−8.3)	6.6 (−14.1)
Record low °F (°C)	−13 (−25)	−8 (−22)	3 (−16)	20 (−7)	26 (−3)	35 (2)	43 (6)	42 (6)	32 (0)	21 (−6)	14 (−10)	−7 (−22)	−13 (−25)
Average precipitation inches (mm)	3.01 (76)	2.58 (66)	3.86 (98)	3.29 (84)	3.63 (92)	4.07 (103)	4.14 (105)	3.99 (101)	4.54 (115)	4.11 (104)	3.19 (81)	3.47 (88)	43.88 (1,115)
Average precipitation days (≥ 0.01 in)	9.4	10.0	11.3	11.1	11.8	13.1	11.2	11.8	12.0	11.3	9.1	10.1	132.2
Source: NOAA

== Demographics ==
Historical population
Census	Pop.	Note	%±
1850	777		—
1860	553		−28.8%
1870	710		28.4%
1880	895		26.1%
1890	1,353		51.2%
1900	1,658		22.5%
1910	1,609		−3.0%
1920	1,710		6.3%
1930	1,763		3.1%
1940	1,820		3.2%
1950	1,923		5.7%
1960	1,765		−8.2%
1970	1,844		4.5%
1980	1,710		−7.3%
1990	3,732		118.2%
2000	4,643		24.4%
2010	6,422		38.3%
2020	7,134		11.1%
U.S. Decennial Census

=== 2020 census ===
As of the 2020 census, Georgetown had a population of 7,134. The median age was 31.8 years. 29.2% of residents were under the age of 18 and 13.9% of residents were 65 years of age or older. For every 100 females there were 97.2 males, and for every 100 females age 18 and over there were 95.6 males age 18 and over.

97.3% of residents lived in urban areas, while 2.7% lived in rural areas.

There were 2,217 households in Georgetown, of which 41.1% had children under the age of 18 living in them. Of all households, 37.2% were married-couple households, 20.0% were households with a male householder and no spouse or partner present, and 35.2% were households with a female householder and no spouse or partner present. About 29.6% of all households were made up of individuals and 15.5% had someone living alone who was 65 years of age or older.

There were 2,367 housing units, of which 6.3% were vacant. The homeowner vacancy rate was 1.4% and the rental vacancy rate was 4.0%.

Racial composition as of the 2020 census
Race	Number	Percent
White	2,702	37.9%
Black or African American	955	13.4%
American Indian and Alaska Native	218	3.1%
Asian	47	0.7%
Native Hawaiian and Other Pacific Islander	23	0.3%
Some other race	2,297	32.2%
Two or more races	892	12.5%
Hispanic or Latino (of any race)	3,665	51.4%

The most reported ancestries in 2020 were:

- Guatemalan (33.3%)
- English (9%)
- Mexican (7.9%)
- African American (6.3%)
- Irish (6.1%)
- German (5.5%)
- Italian (2.2%)
- Haitian (2.1%)
- Maya (1.9%)
- Scottish (1.2%)

=== 2000 census ===
As of the census of 2000, there were 4,643 people, 1,489 households, and 957 families residing in the town. The population density was 1,123.9 inhabitants per square mile (433.9/km^{2}). There were 1,591 housing units at an average density of 385.1 units per square mile (148.7 units/km^{2}). The racial makeup of the town was 56.19% White, 20.87% African American, 2.07% Native American, 0.26% Asian, 0.04% Pacific Islander, 18.03% from other races, and 2.54% from two or more races. Hispanic or Latino of any race were 31.73% of the population.

There were 1,489 households, out of which 32.1% had children under the age of 18 living with them, 41.0% were married couples living together, 16.5% had a female householder with no husband present, and 35.7% were non-families. 28.1% of all households were made up of individuals, and 14.0% had someone living alone who was 65 years of age or older. The average household size was 2.97 and the average family size was 3.29.

In the town, the population was spread out, with 25.4% under the age of 18, 14.3% from 18 to 24, 30.4% from 25 to 44, 16.1% from 45 to 64, and 13.8% who were 65 years of age or older. The median age was 30 years. For every 100 females, there were 107.6 males. For every 100 females age 18 and over, there were 109.5 males.

The median income for a household in the town was $31,875, and the median income for a family was $37,925. Males had a median income of $20,886 versus $19,944 for females. The per capita income for the town was $15,288. About 20.9% of families and 25.1% of the population were below the poverty line, including 34.8% of those under age 18 and 8.4% of those age 65 or over.

In 2000, 21.6% of Georgetown residents identified as being of Guatemalan heritage. This was the highest percentage of Guatemalan Americans in any place in the country.

== Infrastructure ==
=== Transportation ===
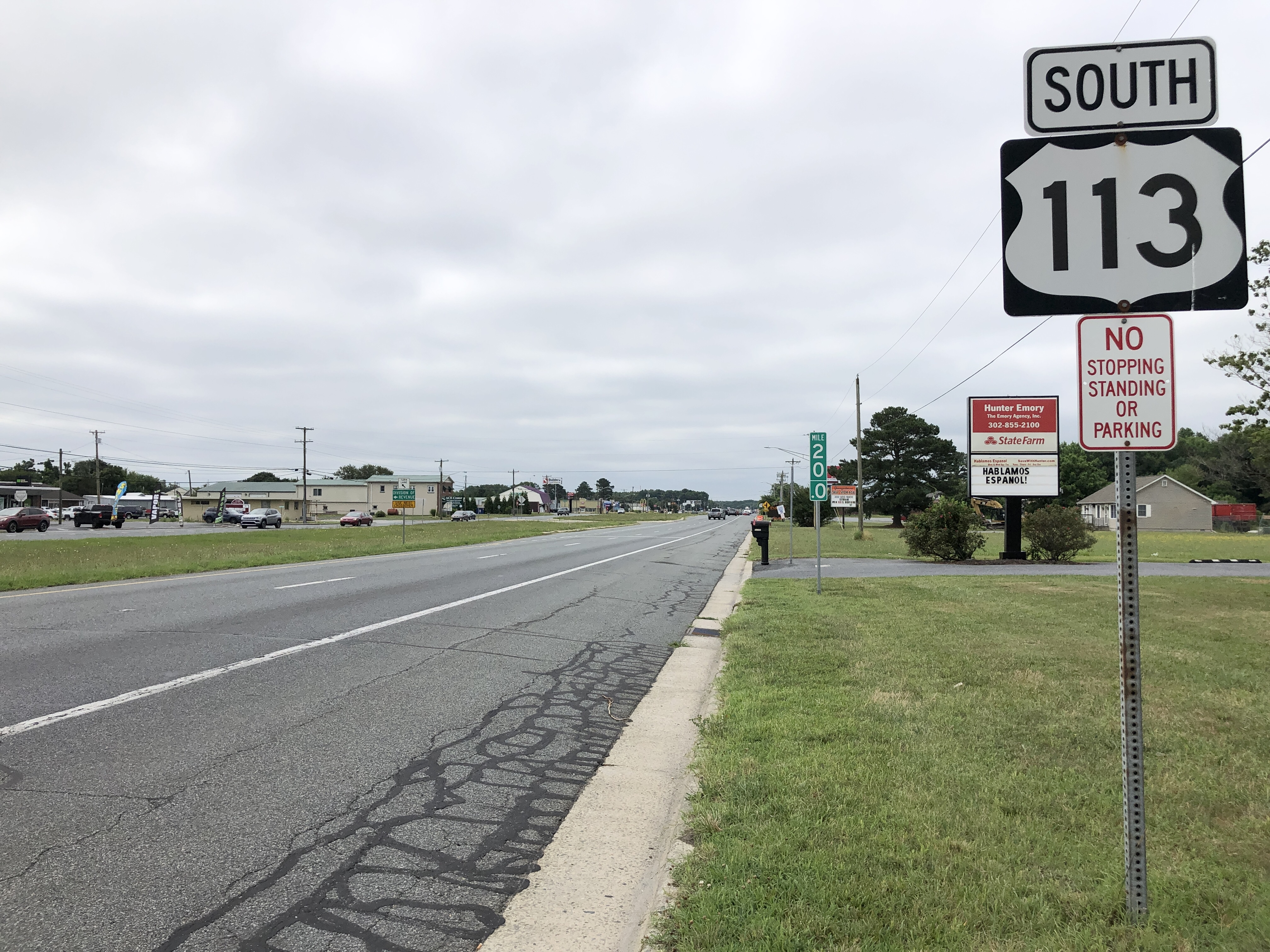
US 113 southbound in Georgetown

The main north–south road in Georgetown is US 113, which passes through the western part of town on Dupont Boulevard and heads south to Millsboro and Pocomoke City, Maryland and north to Milford, where it connects to DE 1 that heads north to Dover and Wilmington. US 9 runs southwest–northeast through Georgetown on Market Street, heading southwest to Laurel and northeast to Lewes and the Cape May–Lewes Ferry across the Delaware Bay. DE 18 begins at US 9 at The Circle in the center of Georgetown and heads northwest on Bedford Street before heading west toward Bridgeville. DE 404 passes through Georgetown as part of a route linking the Baltimore-Washington Metropolitan Area and the Chesapeake Bay Bridge to the Delaware Beaches, entering town from the west concurrent with DE 18 to The Circle, where it joins US 9 and heads northeast along with that route toward the beaches. US 9 Truck and DE 404 Truck provide a bypass of Georgetown to the south for truck traffic. Parking in portions of downtown Georgetown near the Sussex County Courthouse are regulated by two-hour parking meters on weekdays.

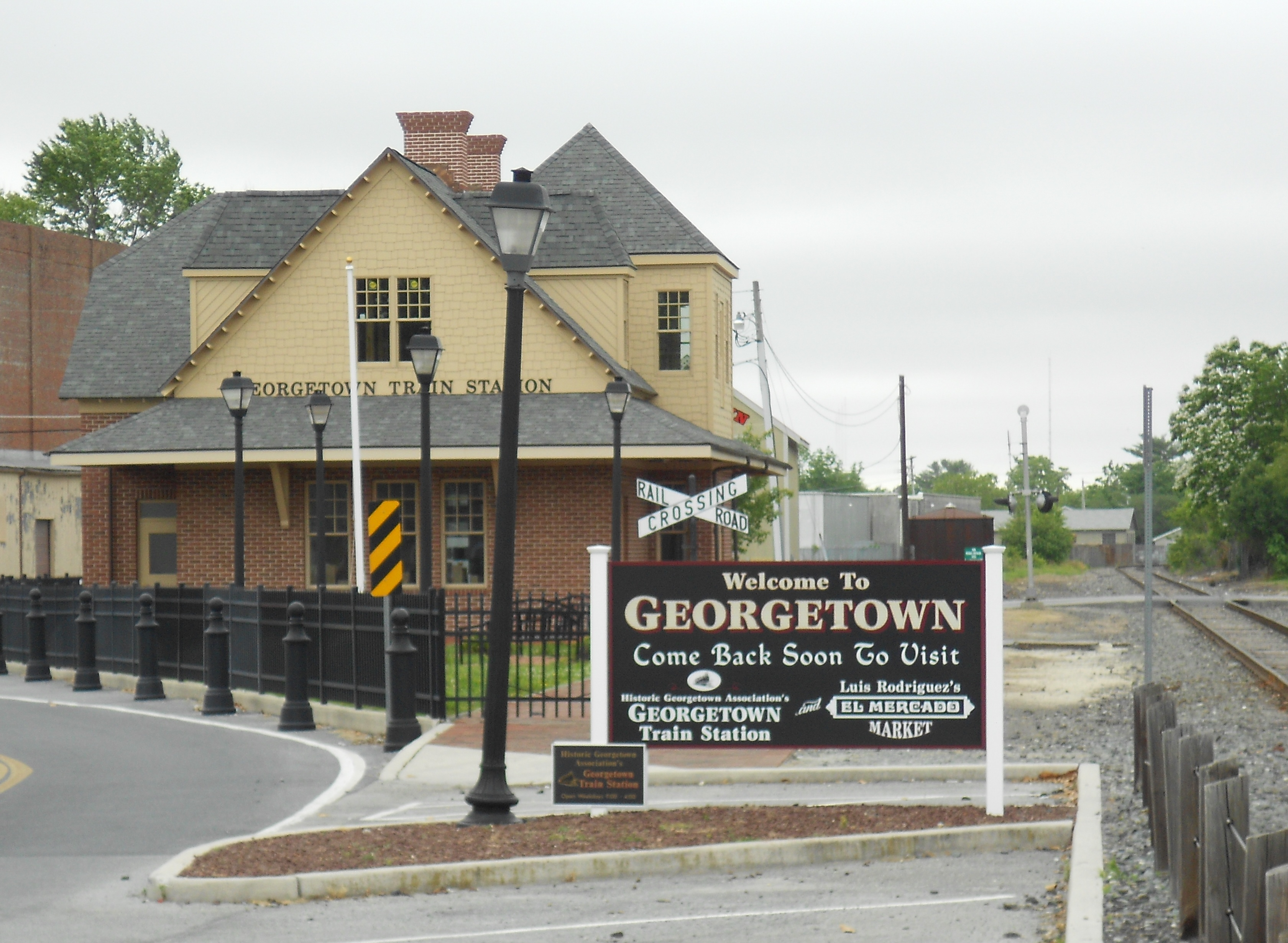
Georgetown's historic railroad station

The Delaware Coastal Airport is located to the east of Georgetown, offering general aviation. The nearest airport with commercial air service is the Wicomico Regional Airport in Salisbury, Maryland.

DART First State provides bus service to Georgetown out of the Georgetown Transit Hub along Route 206, which connects the town to the Lewes Transit Center near Lewes; Route 212, which links Georgetown to Bridgeville, Seaford, Laurel, and Delmar; Route 303, which connects the town to Dover. DART First State also operates a microtransit service called DART Connect serving the Georgetown and Millsboro areas.

Until the late 1940s, the Pennsylvania Railroad operated passenger trains from Harrington, Delaware through Georgetown along the train line of the former Delaware, Maryland and Virginia Railroad (DMV). Travellers from New York or Philadelphia could take trains to Wilmington, whereupon they would take a train to Harrington for the DMV line train. The route continued south to Berlin, Maryland (near Ocean City, Maryland) and to Franklin City, Virginia.

Today, the Delmarva Central Railroad operates a freight rail line called the Indian River Subdivision (the former DMV line) that runs north–south through Georgetown. In Georgetown, the Delmarva Central Railroad's Lewes Industrial Track branches east from the Indian River Subdivision and heads east to Cool Spring.

=== Utilities ===
Delmarva Power, a subsidiary of Exelon, provides electricity to Georgetown. Chesapeake Utilities provides natural gas to the town. The Town of Georgetown Water Department provides water service to the town, operating three water plants. The Town of Georgetown Wastewater Department provides sewer service to the town and some surrounding areas, operating the Georgetown Wastewater Reclamation Facility. Trash and recycling collection in Georgetown is provided under contract by Waste Industries.

The Bruce A. Henry Solar Farm near Georgetown became operational in 2013, and expanded from 23 to 40 acres in 2020.

== Education ==
The Jack F. Owens campus of Delaware Technical Community College is located in Georgetown.

It is in the Indian River School District. Sussex Central High School is located in Georgetown

The Delaware General Assembly created the Georgetown Special School District on April 14, 1919, from Georgetown School District 67. Georgetown School District 223 merged into that district on July 1, 1919. Georgetown Special merged into the Indian River district on July 1, 1969.

In the period of de jure educational segregation in the United States, K-12 students of black African descent attended segregated schools. William C. Jason Comprehensive High School District 192 in Georgetown housed high school students of black African descent during the period 1951 to 1967. Desegregation occurred after 1967.

== Notable people ==
- Wilbur L. Adams, lawyer and U.S. Representative from Delaware
- Matt Barlow, former Iced Earth vocalist, works as a Georgetown police officer
- Julianne Murray, Attorney and chair of the Delaware Republican Party
- Robert H. Pepper, lieutenant general, USMC during World War II
- Luke Petitgout, NFL offensive tackle for New York Giants and Tampa Bay Buccaneers
- Bryan Stevenson, civil rights attorney
- Charles C. Stockley, 45th Governor of Delaware, was born in Georgetown
- George Alfred Townsend, journalist and novelist, namesake of Gathland State Park in Maryland
- Caleb Merrill Wright, jurist and lawyer
- Matt Walsh, American political commentator

== See also ==
- Delaware Confederate Monument
- Sussex Correctional Institution
