= Short Homestead =

Historic house in Delaware, United States

- U.S. National Register of Historic Places
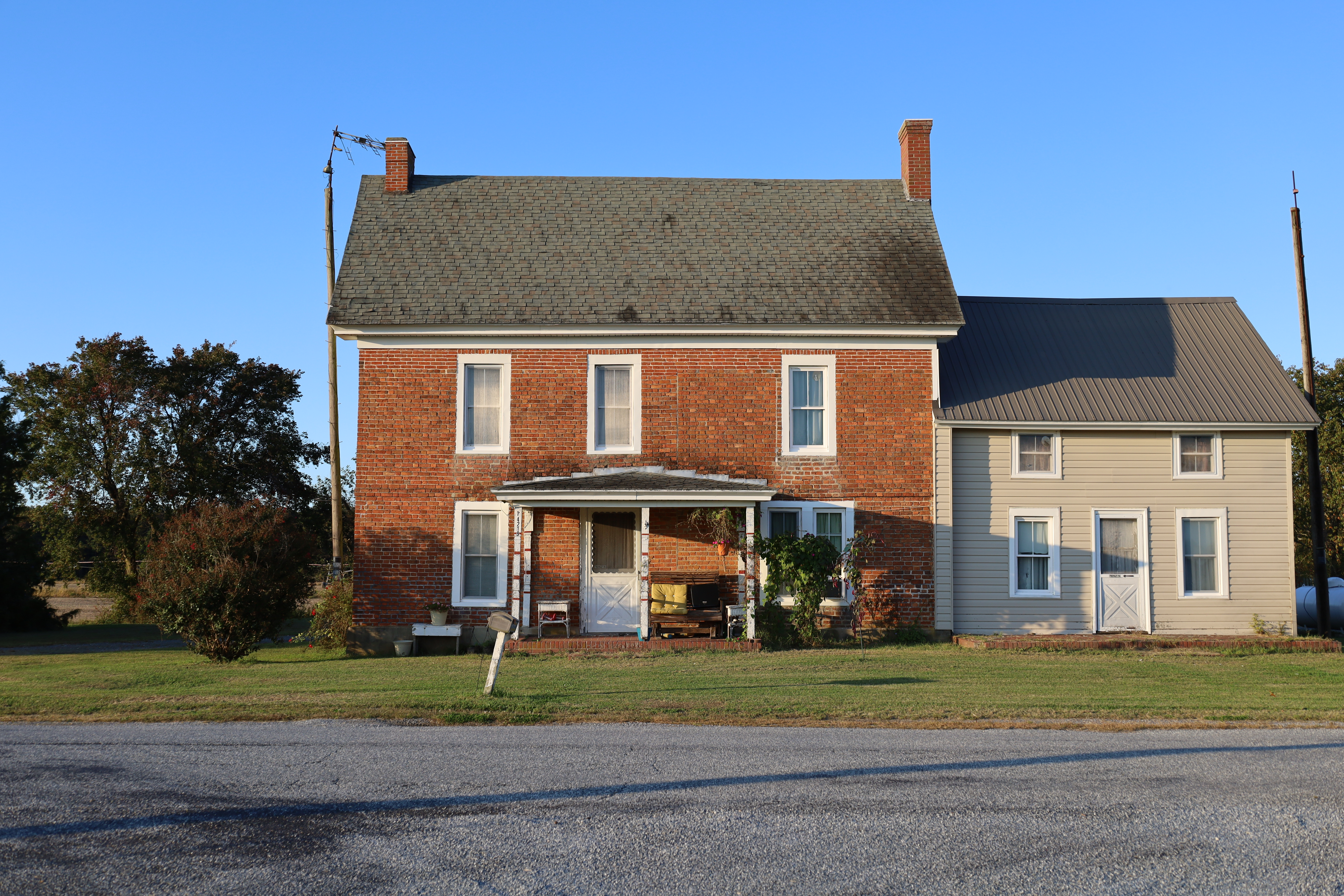

- Location within Delaware Location within the United States
- Location: South of Georgetown on Road 469, near Georgetown, Delaware
- Coordinates: 38°40′54″N 75°30′4″W
- Area: less than one acre
- Built by: Short, John
- NRHP reference No.: 82002361
- Added to NRHP: April 1, 1982

Short Homestead, also known as the James Baxter House, is a historic home and farm located near Georgetown, Sussex County, Delaware. The earlier section is dated to the mid-18th century, and is a two-story, three-bay, double-pile brick structure. A two-story, two-bay frame wing was built in the mid-19th century. Both sections have gable roofs. The house was once the center of a 500-acre plantation. The house was "modernized" in the late-19th century.

The site was added to the National Register of Historic Places in 1982.

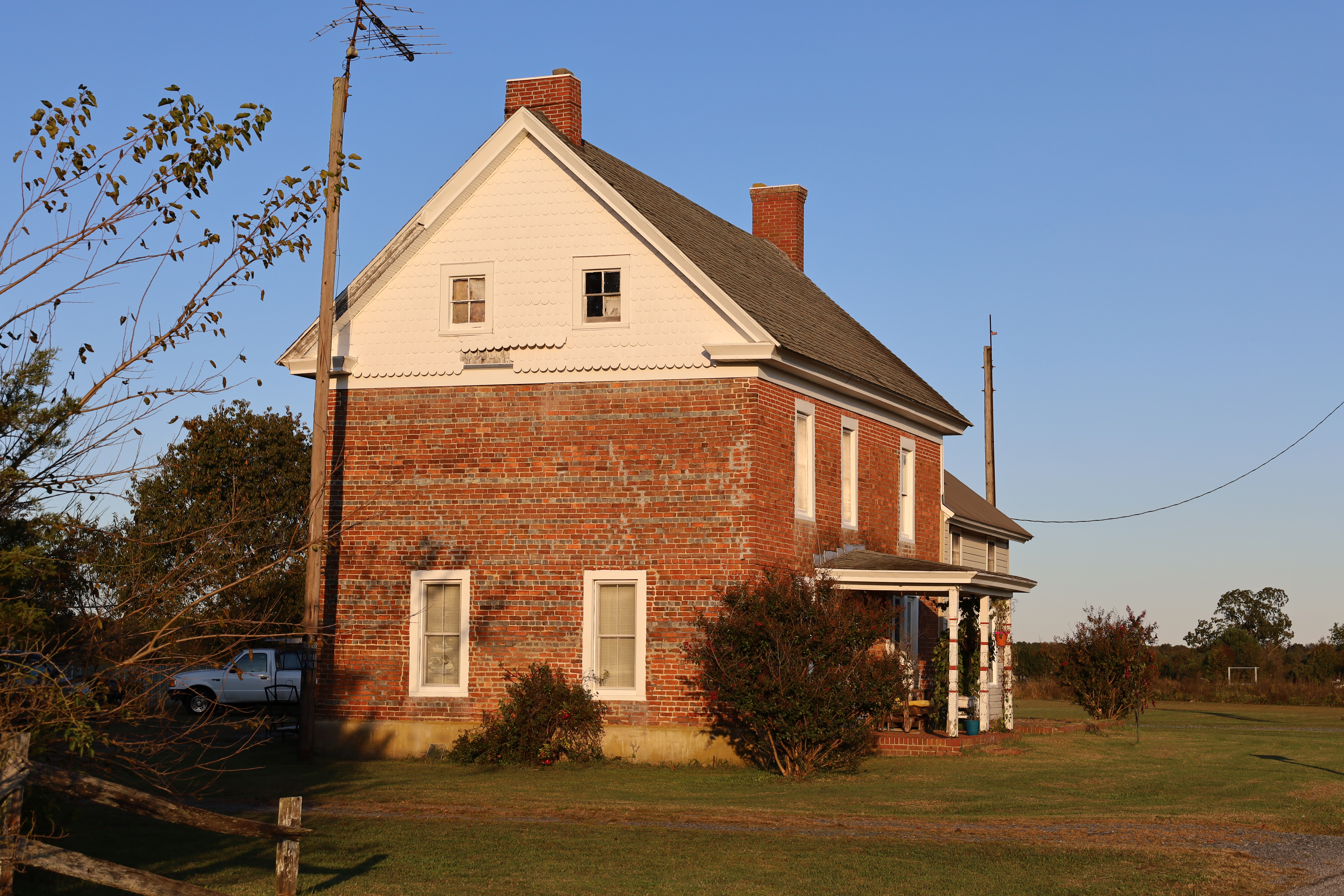
Side of the house
