= Short-Dodson House =

Historic house in Arkansas, United States

- U.S. National Register of Historic Places
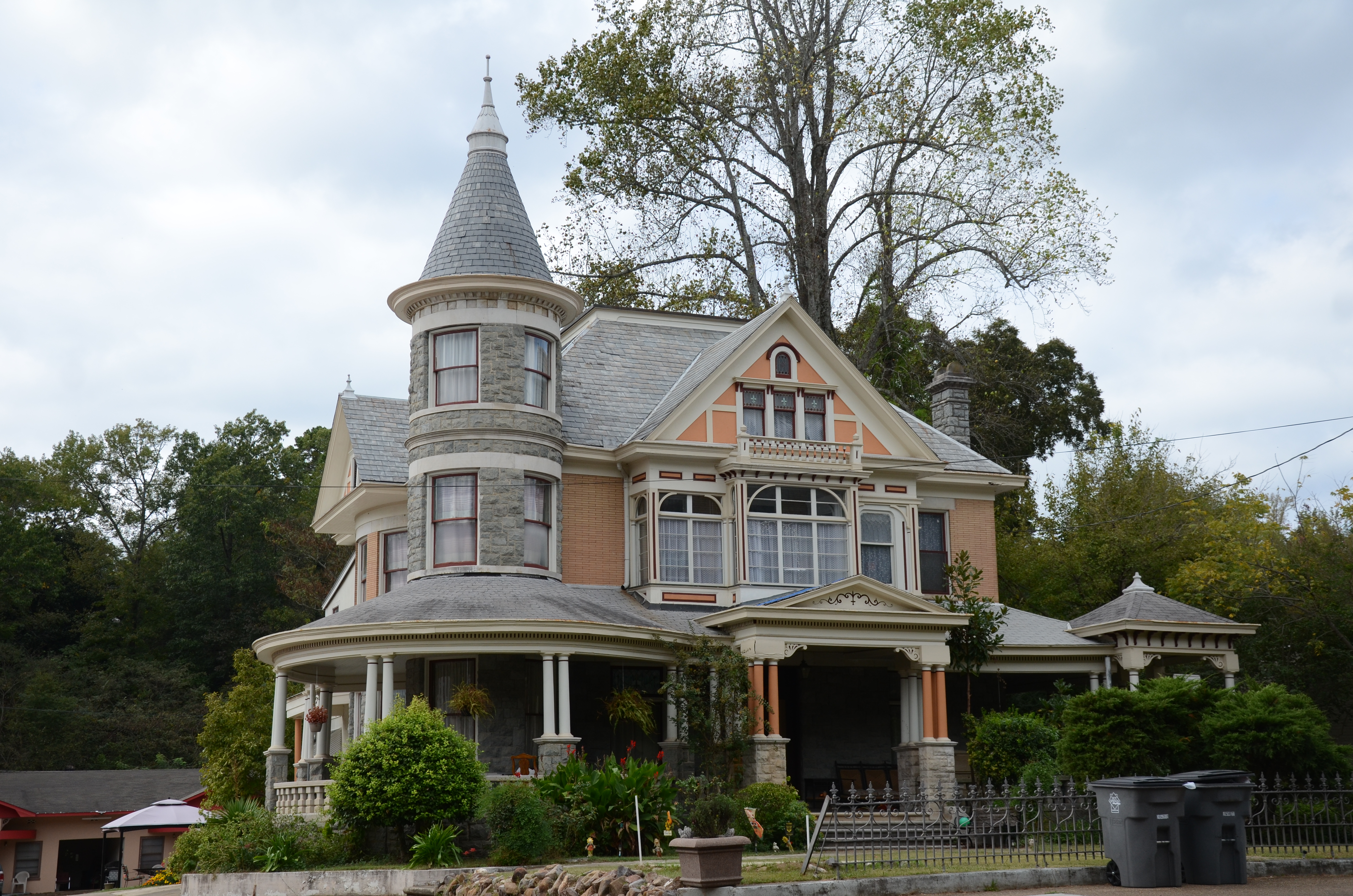

- Location within Arkansas Location within the United States
- Location: 755 Park Ave., Hot Springs, Arkansas
- Coordinates: 34°31′39″N 93°3′7″W
- Area: less than one acre
- Architect: Horn, Joseph G.; Barber, George
- Architectural style: Queen Anne, Chateauesque
- NRHP reference No.: 76000409
- Added to NRHP: May 3, 1976

The Short-Dodson House is a historic house at 755 Park Avenue in Hot Springs, Arkansas. It is a 2 1/2-story masonry structure, its exterior finished in a combination of stone, brick, and wood. It has asymmetrical massing with projecting gables of varying sizes and shapes, and a round corner turret, with an undulating single-story porch wrapping around its south side. It was designed by Joseph G. Horn, and built c. 1902 for Dr. Omar Short, one of many doctors whose homes lined Park Avenue.

The house was listed on the National Register of Historic Places in 1976.

== See also ==
- National Register of Historic Places listings in Garland County, Arkansas
