= O. F. Short House =

- U.S. National Register of Historic Places
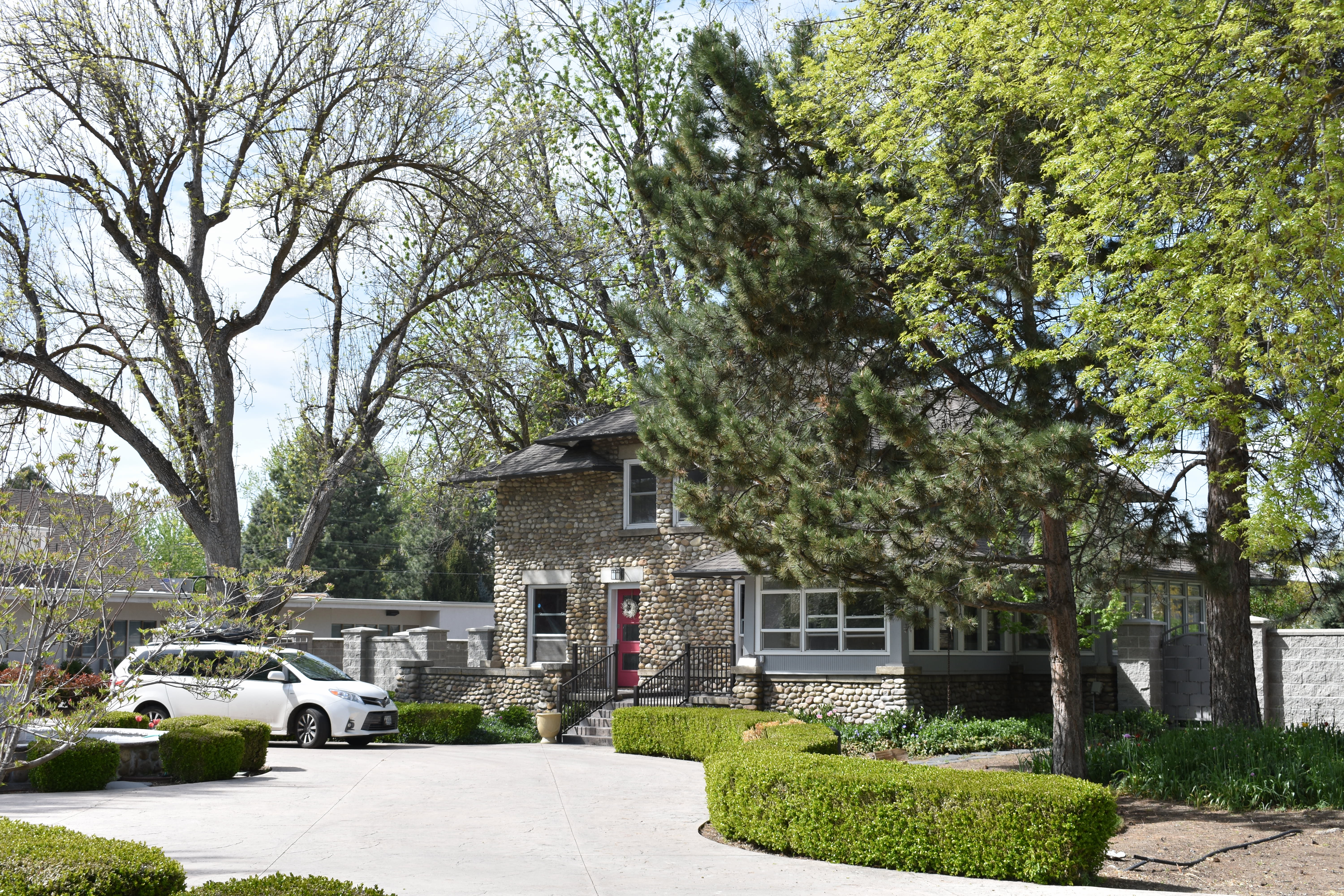
- The O.F. Short House in 2019

- Location within Idaho Location within the United States
- Location: Corner of W State St and N Cobblestone Ln
- Nearest city: Eagle, Idaho
- Coordinates: 43.695212°N 116.360048°W
- Area: less than one acre
- Built: 1906
- Architectural style: Queen Anne, Colonial Revival
- NRHP reference No.: 80001289
- Added to NRHP: May 23, 1980

The O.F. Short House near Eagle, Idaho, is a 1 1/2-story house constructed of native cobble from the Boise River in 1906. The house features elements of Queen Anne and Colonial Revival design, and it includes a hip roof with four dormers. An L-shape porch with battered piers at its corners originally included a crenellated parapet, but the roof was altered after 1980. Architectural historian Patricia Wright considered the O.F. Short House to be unparalleled in Idaho for scale and pretension in its use of cobblestone. The house was added to the National Register of Historic Places in 1980.

== Oliver F. Short ==
Oliver F. Short (August 7, 1866—September 22, 1939) was a cattle rancher and prune farmer near Eagle. He arrived in the Boise Valley in 1890, working for his uncle, Truman C. Catlin, a prominent rancher. In 1863 Catlin and his associates had been awarded a contract to furnish 100,000 shingles for the construction of Fort Boise, and Catlin settled on Eagle Island in that year. In 1887 Short married Florence Smith, the sister of his aunt, Mary (Smith) Catlin.

Oliver and Mary Short enjoyed entertaining at their attractive country home as early as 1903, and further research is needed into the date of construction of the O.F. Short House.

In the 1890s Short planted a 9-acre prune orchard, and by 1912 the farm was said to produce the greatest crop per acre in Idaho, or 31 1/4 tons of prunes per acre. Short also owned a fruit packing business, and he shipped rail carloads of produce from local farms.

After Short died in 1939, the O.F. Short House was occupied briefly by the Lonnie Barber family.
