= Sussex County Courthouse and the Circle =

- U.S. National Register of Historic Places
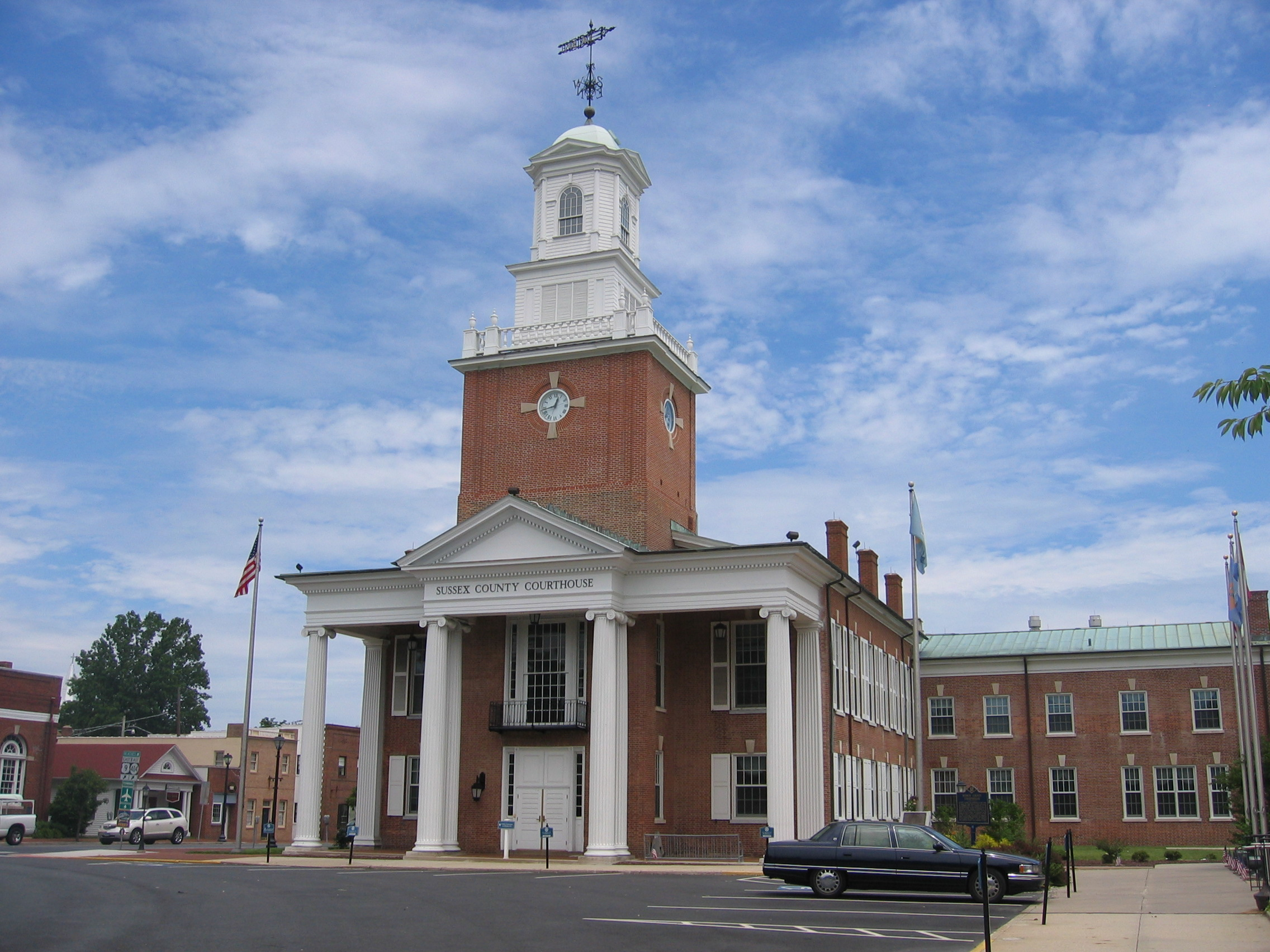
- Sussex County Courthouse, July 2009

- Location within Delaware Location within the United States
- Location: The Circle, Georgetown, Delaware
- Coordinates: 38°41′32″N 75°23′5″W
- Area: less than one acre
- Built: 1837-1840, 1914, 1970
- Architect: Strickland, William
- Architectural style: Georgian
- NRHP reference No.: 73000554
- Added to NRHP: June 4, 1973

Sussex County Courthouse and the Circle is a historic courthouse located at The Circle in Georgetown, Sussex County, Delaware. It was designed by noted Philadelphia architect William Strickland (1788–1854) and built between 1837 and 1840. It is a two-story, brick structure with a brick tower over the entrance hall. It originally featured a squat entrance tower surmounted by an undersized cupola. In 1914, the tower was enlarged and columns were added to the front. Renovations carried out in 1970 gave the building a decidedly more Georgian appearance. The Circle was laid out in 1791-1792 as a public green at the center of a baroque town plan for Georgetown. One of the first buildings constructed was the Old Sussex County Courthouse, which was moved to allow construction of the current Sussex County Courthouse.

The site was added to the National Register of Historic Places in 1973.

== Gallery ==
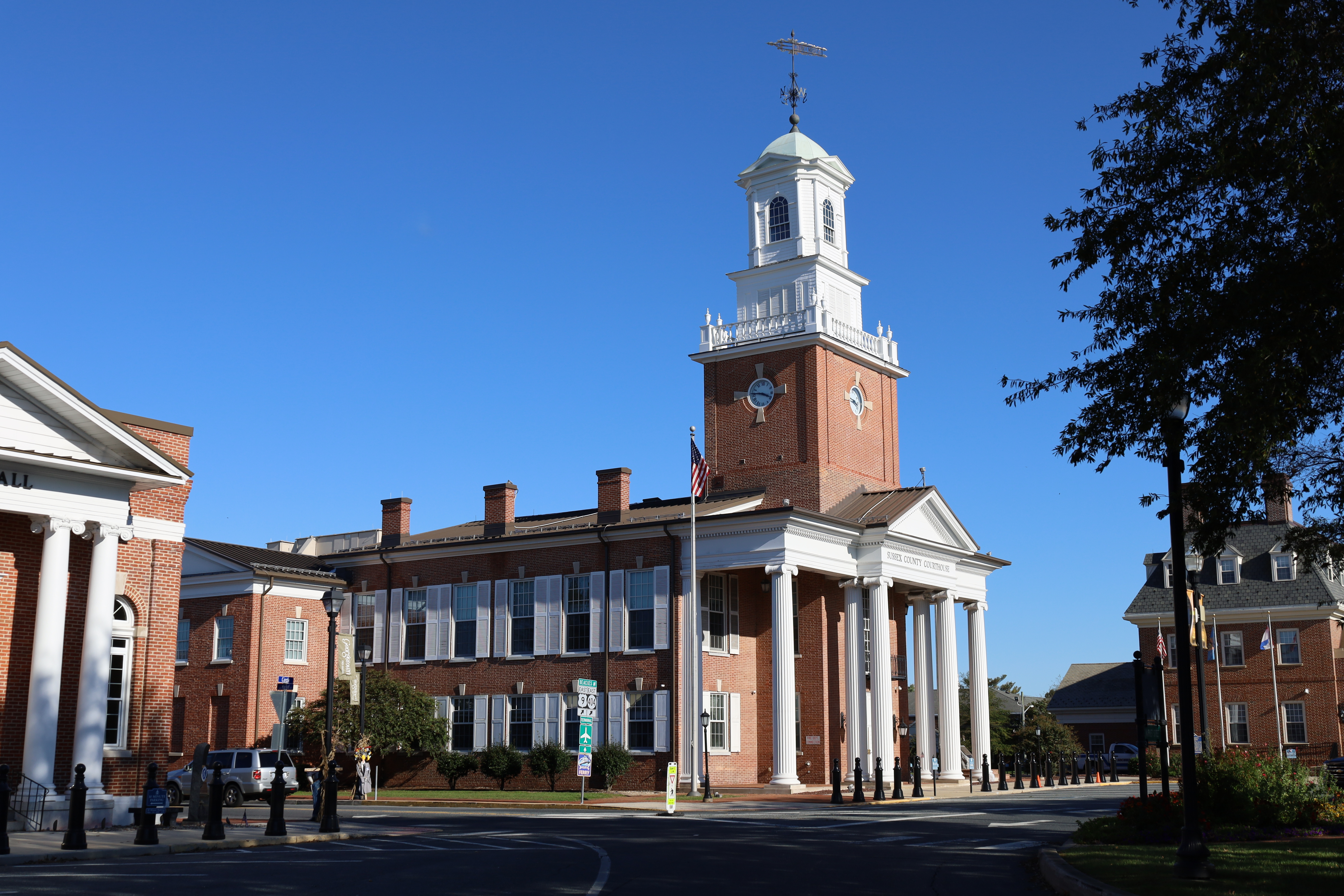
Side view

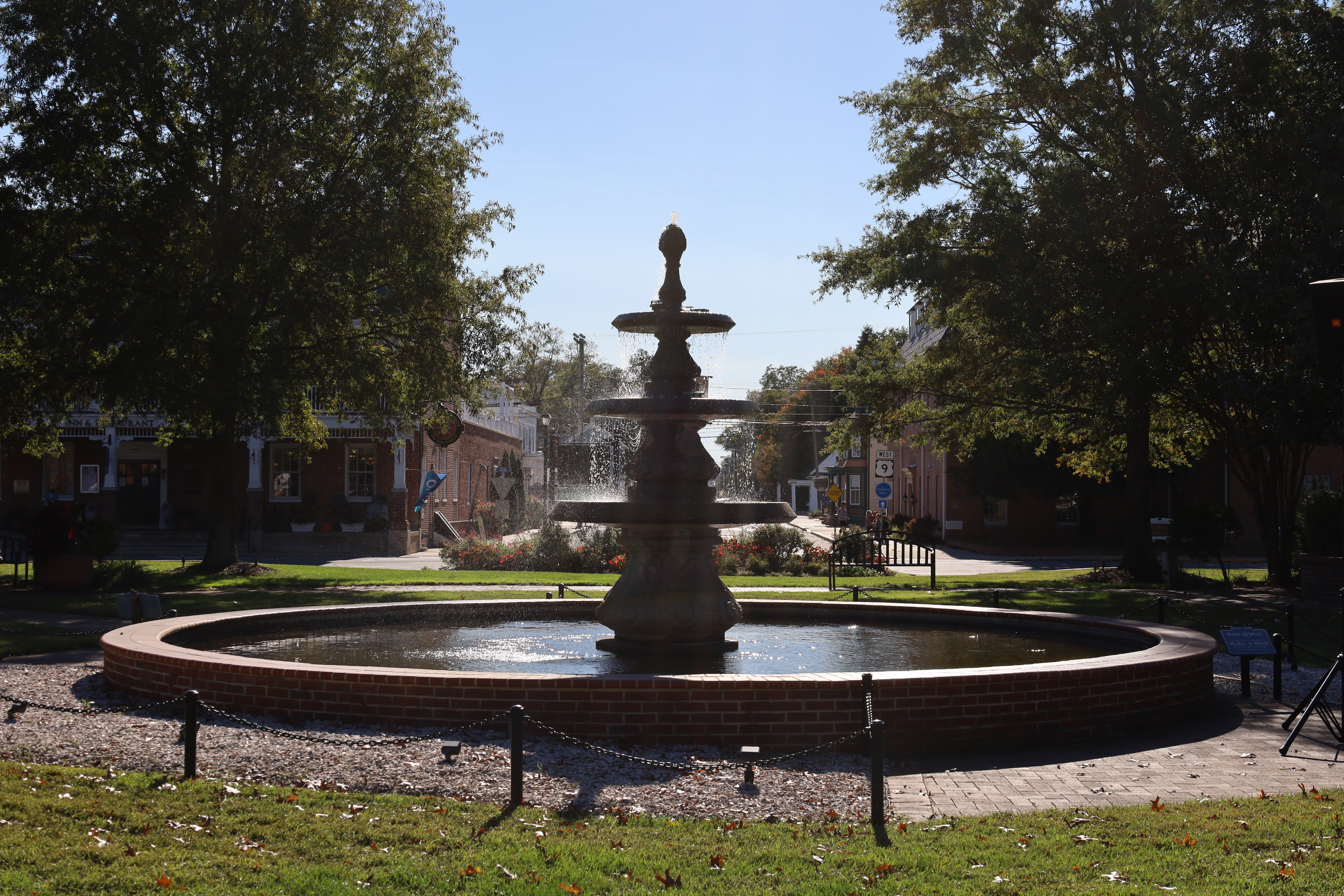
Fountain at the center of the Circle
