= Old Sussex County Courthouse =

- U.S. National Register of Historic Places
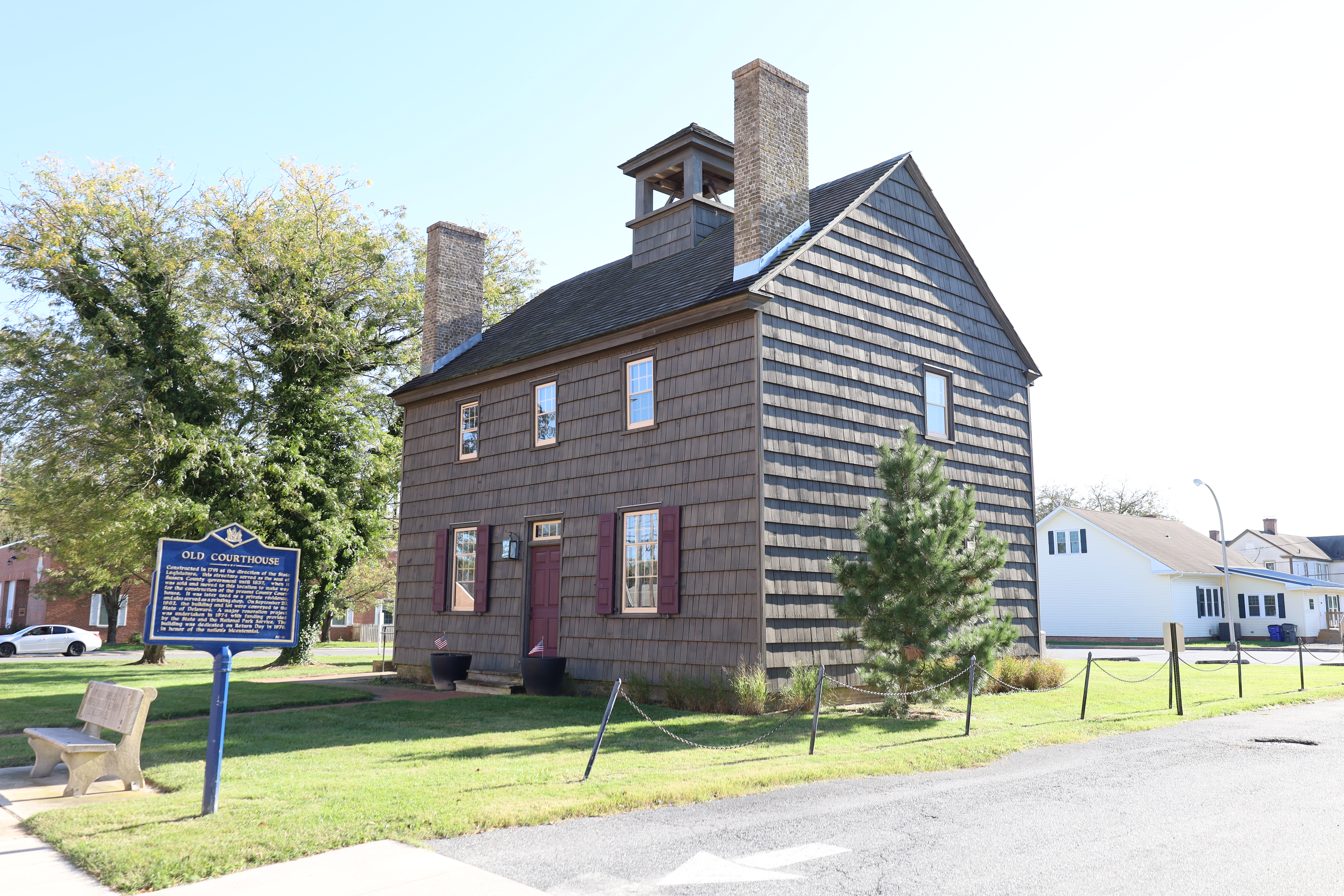
- The building in 2020

- Location within Delaware Location within the United States
- Interactive map showing the location of Old Sussex County Courthouse
- Location: S. Bedford St., Georgetown, Delaware
- Coordinates: 38°41′23″N 75°23′08″W
- Area: 0.5 acres (0.20 ha)
- Built: 1793
- Architectural style: Georgian
- NRHP reference No.: 71000236
- Added to NRHP: March 24, 1971

Old Sussex County Courthouse is a historic courthouse located at Georgetown, Sussex County, Delaware. It was built in 1793, and is a two-story, five-bay, frame structure in a late Georgian style. It is sheathed in cypress shingles. It was moved to its present location in 1837 and converted to residential use. Its former site on The Circle is occupied by the present Sussex County Courthouse. On September 20, 1962, the building and lot were conveyed to the State of Delaware. A major renovation project was undertaken in 1974.

The site was added to the National Register of Historic Places in 1971.
