= Shorter House (music publisher) =

British classical sheet music publisher

- Founded: 2010
- Founder: Tom Shorter
- Country of origin: United Kingdom
- Headquarters location: London
- Publication types: sheet music
- Official website: www.shorterhouse.com

Shorter House is a classical sheet music publisher, founded in 2010, specializing in choral church music. According to the Music Publishers Association (UK) it also publishes choral/vocal, early music and ballet.

Shorter House is based in London, UK, and has a distribution agreement in the United States and Canada with the established music publisher Edition Peters.
