= 1970–71 Delaware Fightin' Blue Hens women's basketball team =

Intercollegiate basketball season

1970–71 Delaware Fightin' Blue Hens women's basketball
- Record: 4–5 (0–0 )
- Head coach: Mary Ann Hitchens (1st season)

The 1970–71 Delaware Fightin' Blue Hens women's basketball team represented the University of Delaware during the 1970–71 school year. This marked the second year of the program as a sanctioned sport by the university. Women's basketball, field hockey, and swimming had been approved on an experimental two-year basis in early 1969. This was also the first year of varsity coaching for head coach Mary Ann Hitchens, who had led the 1969–70 freshman women's team to an undefeated 5–0 record the prior season.

== Roster ==
1970–71 Delaware Fightin' Blue Hens women's basketball team
Players
Coaches

Pos.	#	Name	Height	Year	Previous school	Hometown
		Jane Cooper	—	Sr	Laurel HS	Laurel, Delaware
	4	Millie Donovan	5 ft 8 in (1.73 m)	Sr	Henry C. Conrad HS	Wilmington, Delaware
		Pat Drozdowski	—	So	Henry C. Conrad HS	Wilmington, Delaware
		Pat Dyal	5 ft 8 in (1.73 m)	Sr	John Dickinson HS	Wilmington, Delaware
		Joyce Emory	—	So	Milford HS	Milford, Delaware
		Gail Evans	—	Sr	Bridgeville HS	Bridgeville, Delaware
		Karen Lewis	—	So	Newark HS	Newark, Delaware
		Doni Lofland	—	So	Seaford HS	Seaford, Delaware
		Wendy Miller	—	Jr	Avon Grove HS	London Grove, PA
		Terry Rubino	—	So	Laurel HS	Laurel, Delaware
		Phyllis Shomo	—	So	Wilmington Friends HS	Wilmington, Delaware
F		Diane Stetina	—	So	Henry C. Conrad HS	Wilmington, Delaware

Head coach

- Mary Ann Hitchens

Assistant coach(es)

Legend

- (C) Team captain
- (S) Suspended
- (I) Ineligible
- (W) Walk-on
- Injured
- Current redshirt

== Schedule ==
Date time, TV	Rank^{#}	Opponent^{#}	Result	Record	Site (attendance) city, state
Non-conference regular season
February 11, 1971*		at Glassboro State College	L 37–64	0–1	Glassboro, NJ
February 15, 1971*		Salisbury State College	L 26–43	0–2	Carpenter Sports Building; Newark, DE
February 23, 1971*		Chesapeake College	W 41–18	1–2	Carpenter Sports Building; Newark, DE
February 25, 1971*		at West Chester State College	L 35–48	1–3	West Chester, PA
March 1, 1971*		at Catonsville Community College	L 52–61	1–4	Catonsville, MD
March 5, 1971*		Millersville State College	W 59–44	2–4	Carpenter Sports Building; Newark, DE
March 10, 1971*		Camden County College	W 63–37	3–4	Carpenter Sports Building; Newark, DE
Mid Atlantic Regional Women's Intercollegiate Basketball Tournament
March 18, 1971*		Georgetown University; First Round	W 63–28	4–4	Carpenter Sports Building; Newark, DE
March 19, 1971*		Ursinus College; Quarterfinals	L 28–72	4–5	Carpenter Sports Building; Newark, DE
*Non-conference game. ^{#}Rankings from AP Poll. (#) Tournament seedings in parentheses. All times are in Eastern Time.
