= 1969–70 Delaware Fightin' Blue Hens women's basketball team =

Intercollegiate basketball season

1969–70 Delaware Fightin' Blue Hens women's basketball
- Record: 1–5 (0–0 )
- Head coach: Susana Occhi (1st season)

The 1969–70 Delaware Fightin' Blue Hens women's basketball team represented the University of Delaware during the 1969–70 school year. A committee approached the university's athletic council in early 1969 to gain approval for the university to begin sanctioning women's intercollegiate sports. Women's basketball, field hockey, and swimming were approved on an experimental two-year basis. Delaware played a six game season, finishing with a 1–5 record.

== Roster ==
1969–70 Delaware Fightin' Blue Hens women's basketball team
Players
Coaches

Pos.	#	Name	Height	Year	Previous school	Hometown
	13	Cathy Chlebowski	5 ft 8 in (1.73 m)	Jr	Henry C. Conrad HS
		Kathie Devenney	—	So	Newark HS	Newark, Delaware
	4	Millie Donovan	5 ft 8 in (1.73 m)	Jr	Henry C. Conrad HS	Wilmington, Delaware
		Pat Dyal	5 ft 8 in (1.73 m)	Jr	John Dickinson HS	Wilmington, Delaware
		Gail Evans	—	Jr	Bridgeville HS	Bridgeville, Delaware
		Debbie Freeman	—	Jr
		Dianne Lippert	—	Jr	Bridgeville HS	Bridgeville, Delaware
		Wendy Miller	—	So	Avon Grove HS	London Grove, PA
		Smith	—

Head coach

- Susana Occhi

Assistant coach(es)

- Charlene Davenport
- Cathy Lyness

Legend

- (C) Team captain
- (S) Suspended
- (I) Ineligible
- (W) Walk-on
- Injured
- Current redshirt

== Schedule ==
Date time, TV	Rank^{#}	Opponent^{#}	Result	Record	Site (attendance) city, state
Non-conference regular season
February 5, 1970*; 4:15 pm		Glassboro State College	L 37–67	0–1	Hartshorn Gymnasium; Newark, DE
February 12, 1970*; 7:15 pm		Wesley College	W 56–23	1–1	Hartshorn Gymnasium; Newark, DE
February 17, 1970*; 7:15 pm		at Salisbury State College	L 17–44	1–2	Salisbury, MD
February 23, 1970*		Catonsville Community College	L 54–69	1–3	Hartshorn Gymnasium; Newark, DE
March 3, 1970*		at West Chester State College	L 36–38	1–4	West Chester, PA
March 12, 1970*		at Millersville State College	L 43–54	1–5	Millersville, PA
*Non-conference game. ^{#}Rankings from AP Poll. (#) Tournament seedings in parentheses. All times are in Eastern Time.
