= Bridgeville Historic District =

Historic district in Delaware, United States

- U.S. National Register of Historic Places
- U.S. Historic district
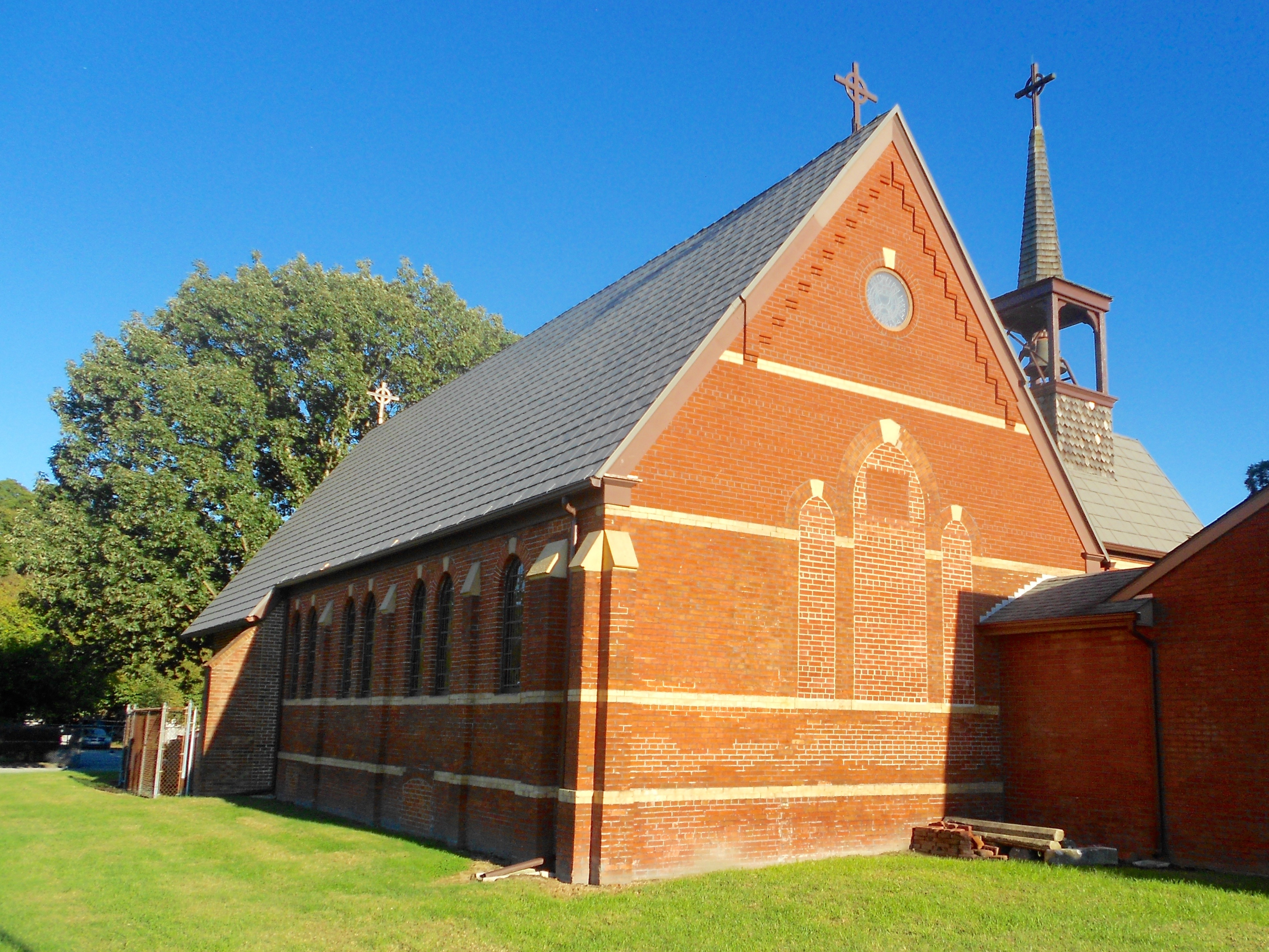
- St. Mary's Episcopal Church

- Location within Delaware Location within the United States
- Location: Roughly bounded by Market, Main and Edgewood Sts., School House Ln., Maple Alley and the Delmarva Central Railroad tracks, Bridgeville, Delaware
- Coordinates: 38°44′28″N 75°36′06″W
- Area: 75 acres (30 ha)
- Built: 1856
- Architectural style: Late 19th And 20th Century Revivals, Late 19th And Early 20th Century American Movements, Late Victorian
- NRHP reference No.: 94000361
- Added to NRHP: April 14, 1994

Bridgeville Historic District, also known as Lewisville and Lewis' Wharf, is a national historic district located at Bridgeville, Sussex County, Delaware. The district includes 166 contributing buildings and 70 contributing structures at Bridgeville, a center of agricultural commerce. The district is primarily residential with resources built from the second quarter of the 19th century through the Great Depression. The dwellings are in a variety of vernacular forms including the "I-house," Shotgun house, and late 19th and 20th century revivals. Located in the district and separately listed are the Bridgeville Public Library and Old Bridgeville Fire House.

It was added to the National Register of Historic Places in 1994.

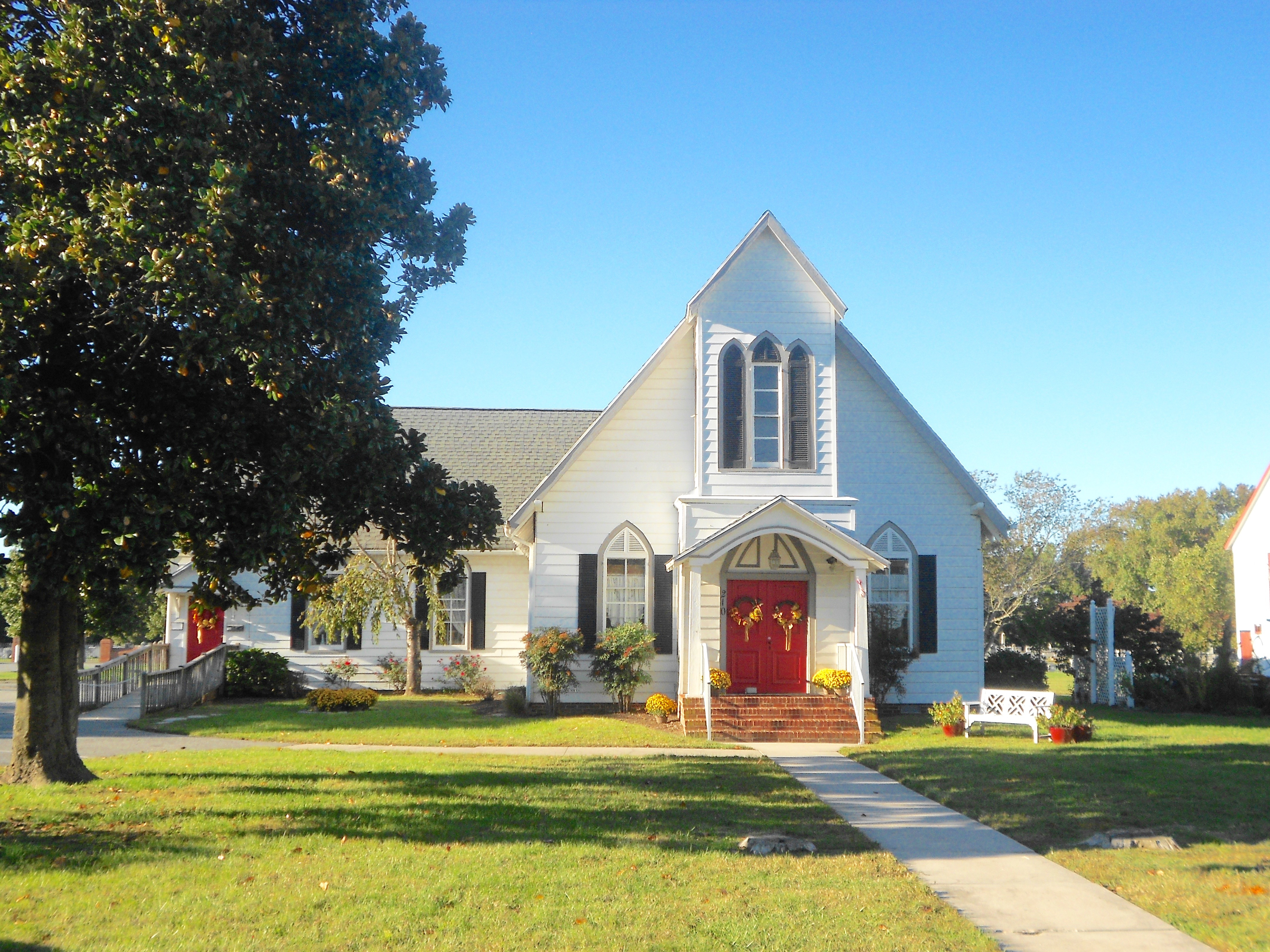
The former Bridgeville Public Library building

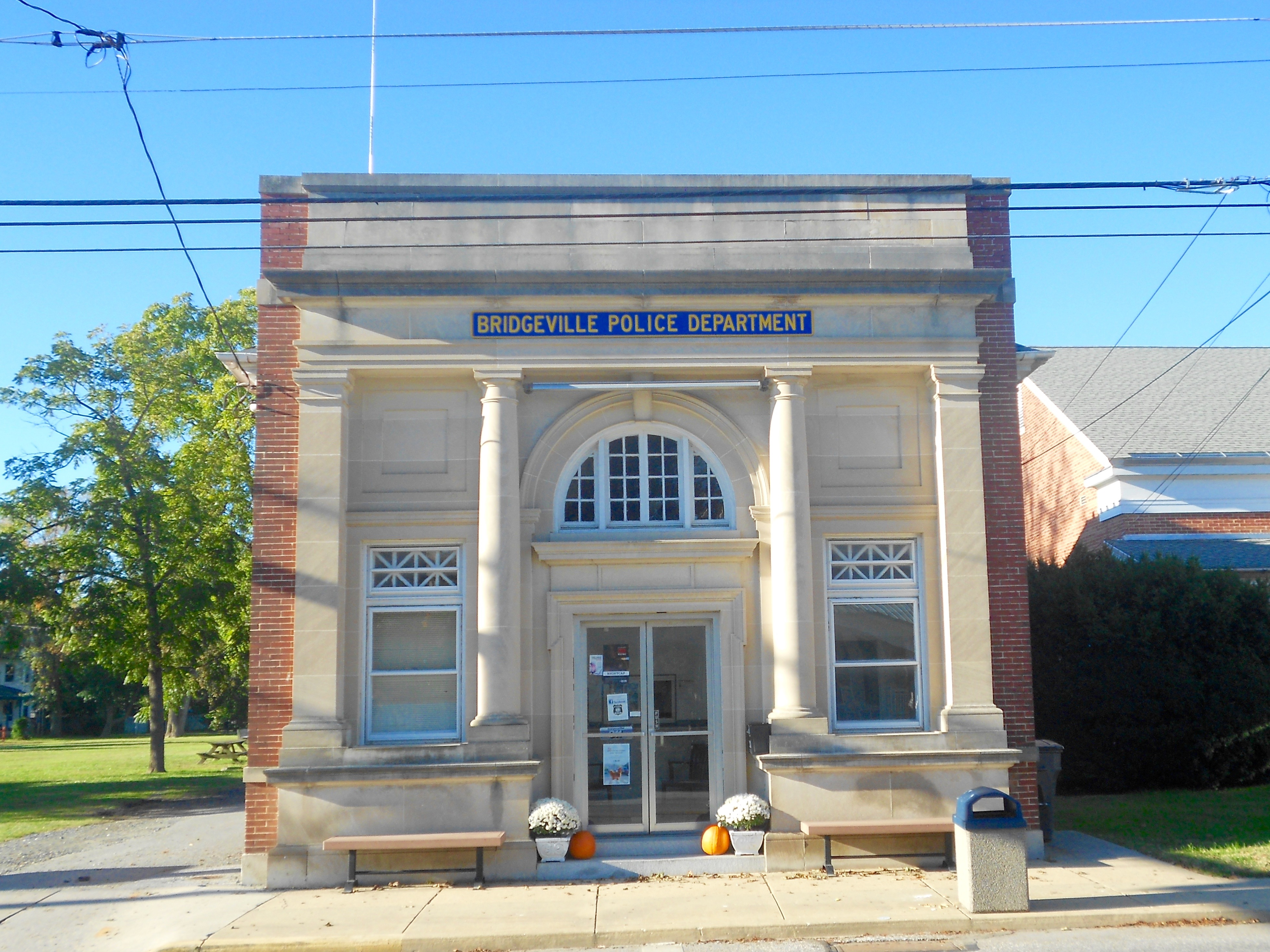
This is the former police department building
