= Sudler =

Sudler is a surname. Notable people with the surname include:

- Monnette Sudler (1952–2022), American jazz guitarist
- Whitney Sudler-Smith (born 1968), American filmmaker, television director, and guitarist

== See also ==
- Sudler House
