= Tharp House =

Tharp House may refer to:

- Tharp House (Fayetteville, Arkansas), listed on the National Register of Historic Places in Washington County, Arkansas
- Tharp's Log, Three Rivers, California, a home in a big log, listed on the National Register of Historic Places in Tulare County, California
- Tharp House (Farmington, Delaware), listed on the National Register of Historic Places in Kent County, Delaware
