= Bethel Methodist Protestant Church =

Historic church in Delaware, United States

- U.S. National Register of Historic Places
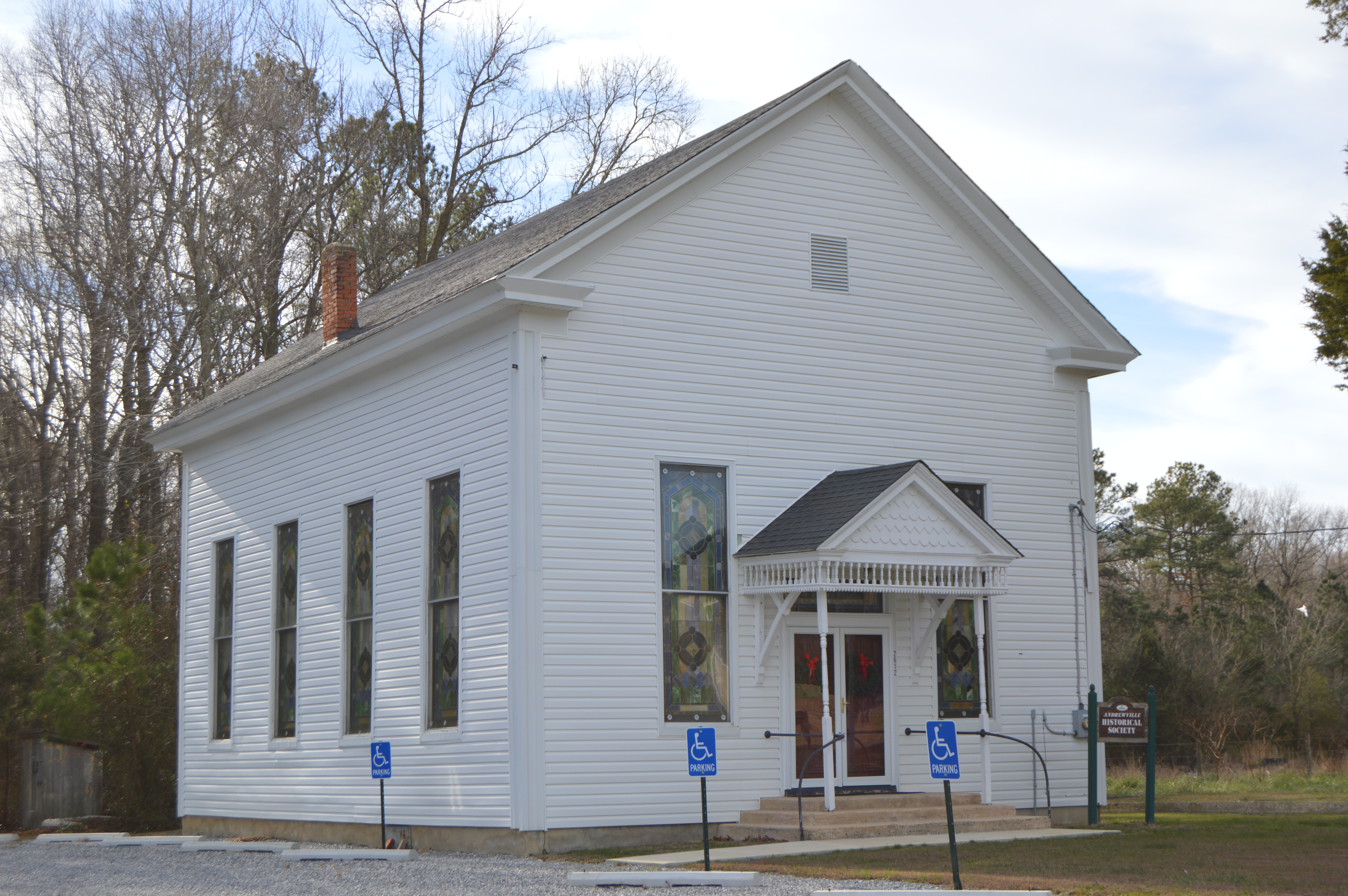
- Front and eastern side

- Location within Delaware Location within the United States
- Location: 2566 Andrewville Road, Andrewville, Delaware 19952
- Coordinates: 38°51′49″N 75°38′13″W
- Area: 2 acres (0.81 ha)
- Built: 1871
- Architectural style: Gothic
- NRHP reference No.: 98001093
- Added to NRHP: September 14, 1998

Bethel Methodist Protestant Church, also known as Bethel Church, is a historic Methodist church and cemetery at the junction of Andrewville Road and Todds Chapel Road/Prospect Church Road in Andrewville, Kent County, Delaware. It was built in 1871, and is a one-story, three-by-four-bay, gable-roofed, Gothic-influenced frame building. It measures 30 feet 6 inches (9.30 m) in width by 40 feet 6 inches (12.34 m) deep. The interior was renovated in 1905. Adjacent to the church is the cemetery, containing only one or two gravestones.

It was added to the National Register of Historic Places in 1998.
