= Farmington, Delaware =

- Town
- Seal

- Location of Farmington in Kent County, Delaware.

- Location within the state of Delaware Farmington (the United States)
- Coordinates: 38°52′09″N 75°34′43″W
- Country: United States
- State: Delaware
- County: Kent

Government
  - Mayor: Cindy Bolin

Area
  - Total: 0.073 sq mi (0.19 km^{2})
  - Land: 0.073 sq mi (0.19 km^{2})
  - Water: 0 sq mi (0.00 km^{2})
- Elevation: 62 ft (19 m)

Population (2020)
  - Total: 92
  - Density: 1,265.2/sq mi (488.48/km^{2})
- Time zone: UTC−5 (Eastern (EST))
  - Summer (DST): UTC−4 (EDT)
- ZIP code: 19950
- Area code: 302
- FIPS code: 10-25840
- GNIS feature ID: 213949
- Website: www.farmingtondelaware.com

Farmington is a town in Kent County, Delaware, United States. It is part of the Dover metropolitan area. The population was 92 in 2020.

== History ==
Farmington was originally settled as Flatiron in 1855 when the railroad built a station at a crossroads at this location. A post office was established in 1858. The town was the location of the Farmington Academy from 1868 to 1878. Farmington had 300 people in the 1880s and was home to canning and fruit-evaporating plants. The Tharp House was listed on the National Register of Historic Places in 1973. Farmington formerly had a post office with a ZIP code of 19942; however, the post office closed and the ZIP code was discontinued on January 13, 1996. Farmington is currently served by the Greenwood post office with a ZIP code of 19950.

== Geography ==
According to the United States Census Bureau, the town has a total area of 0.1 square miles (0.26 km^{2}), all land.

== Demographics ==
Historical population
Census	Pop.	Note	%±
1890	468		—
1910	255		—
1920	124		−51.4%
1930	117		−5.6%
1940	120		2.6%
1950	113		−5.8%
1960	142		25.7%
1970	109		−23.2%
1980	141		29.4%
1990	122		−13.5%
2000	75		−38.5%
2010	110		46.7%
2020	92		−16.4%
U.S. Decennial Census

At the 2000 census there were 75 people, 31 households, and 20 families living in the town. The population density was 1,075.6 inhabitants per square mile (415.3/km^{2}). There were 35 housing units at an average density of 501.9 units per square mile (193.8 units/km^{2}). The racial makeup of the town was 99.00% White. Of the 31 households 22.6% had children under the age of 18 living with them, 48.4% were married couples living together, 6.5% had a female householder with no husband present, and 32.3% were non-families. 25.8% of households were one person and 16.1% were one person aged 65 or older. The average household size was 2.42 and the average family size was 2.76.

The age distribution was 20.0% under the age of 18, 4.0% from 18 to 24, 32.0% from 25 to 44, 25.3% from 45 to 64, and 18.7% 65 or older. The median age was 42 years. For every 100 females, there were 120.6 males. For every 100 females age 18 and over, there were 130.8 males.

The median household income was $41,458 and the median family income was $38,750. Males had a median income of $17,917 versus $21,429 for females. The per capita income for the town was $16,423. There were no families and 7.0% of the population living below the poverty line, including no under eighteens and none of those over 64.

== Infrastructure ==
=== Transportation ===
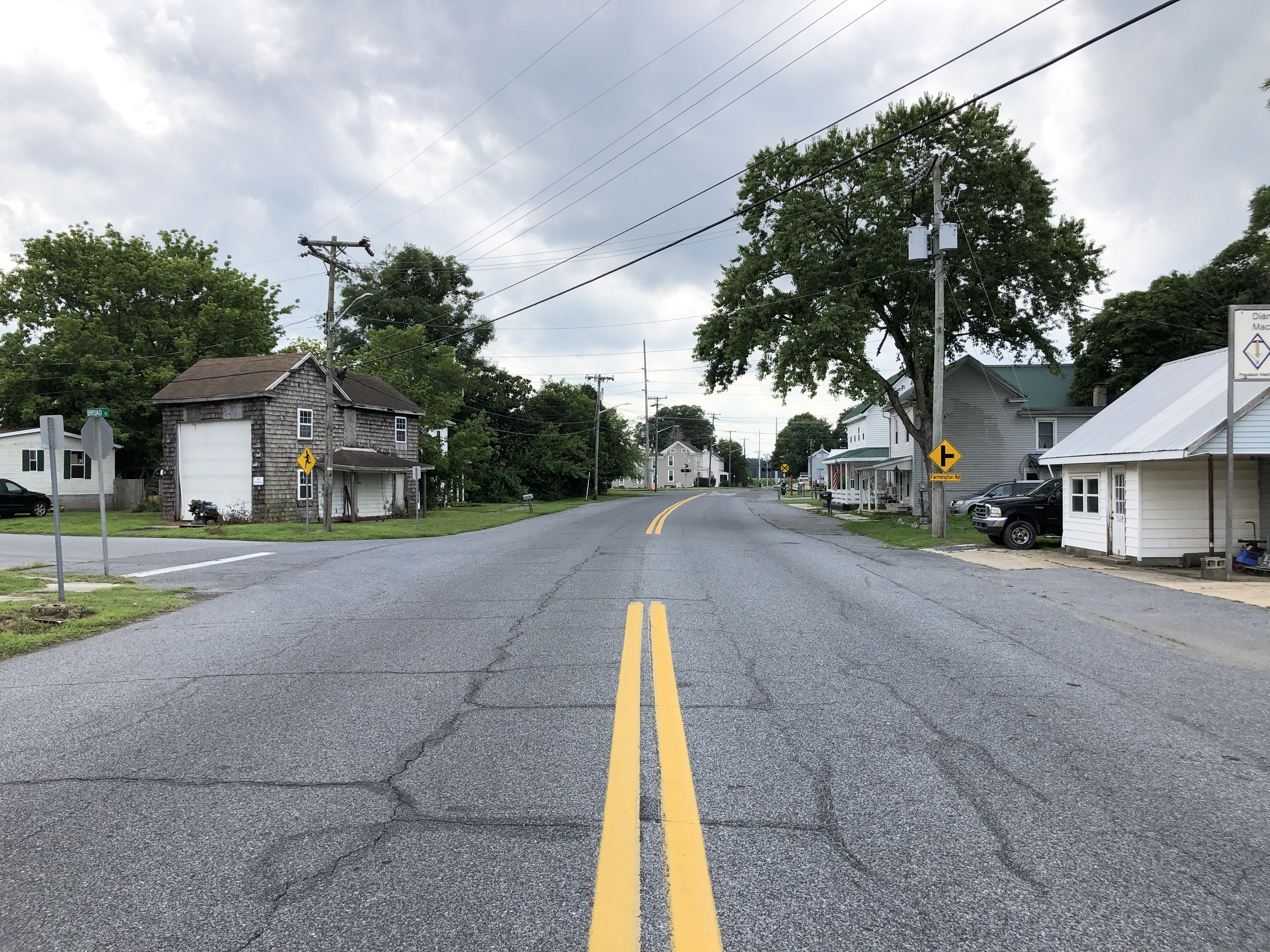
Main Street in Farmington

No state highways pass directly through Farmington. U.S. Route 13 passes north–south just beyond the eastern edge of Farmington on Dupont Highway and leads north toward Harrington and south toward Greenwood. Main Street begins at US 13 and runs east–west through Farmington, becoming Andrewville Road outside the town and leading west toward Andrewville. The Delmarva Central Railroad's Delmarva Subdivision line passes north–south through Farmington.

=== Utilities ===
Delmarva Power, a subsidiary of Exelon, provides electricity to Farmington. Chesapeake Utilities provides natural gas to the town.

== Education ==
Farmington is in the Woodbridge School District. Woodbridge High School is the zoned high school.

== Notable people ==
- Lyman Pierson Powell (born 1866), (alternate spelling is Pearson), Episcopalian priest, Hobart college president, historian and author
- William Tharp, 36th Governor of Delaware
