= Woodbridge School District =

School district in Delaware, United States

Location
- 16359 Sussex Highway, Bridgeville postal address, DE 19933 Northwestern Sussex County and southwestern Kent County, Delaware United States

District information
- Type: Public
- Grades: K−12
- Superintendent: Heath Chasanov

Students and staff
- Students: 2,466
- Teachers: 157
- Staff: 178
- Athletic conference: Henlopen South Conference
- District mascot: Blue Raider
- Colors: Blue, gray, and white

Other information
- Website: Official Site

The Woodbridge School District is a public school district in northwestern Sussex County and southwestern Kent County, Delaware in the United States. The district's administrative offices are in an unincorporated area with a Bridgeville postal address.

== Geography ==
The Woodbridge School District serves the northwestern portion Sussex County and the extreme southwestern portion of Kent County in the state of Delaware. Communities served by the district include the majority of Bridgeville and all of Greenwood in Sussex County and all of Farmington in Kent County.

== School board ==
- P. Michael Breeding, President
- Walter Rudy, Vice President
- Walter P.J. Gilfeski
- John Barr
- Steve McCarron
- Heath Chasanov, Executive Secretary

== Schools ==
- Woodbridge High School
- Woodbridge Middle School
- Phillis Wheatley Elementary School
- Woodbridge Early Childhood Education Center

== Facilities ==
The headquarters were previously in Greenwood.

== See also ==
- List of school districts in Delaware
