= Trinity Methodist Episcopal Church (Bridgeville, Delaware) =

Historic church in Delaware, United States

- U.S. National Register of Historic Places
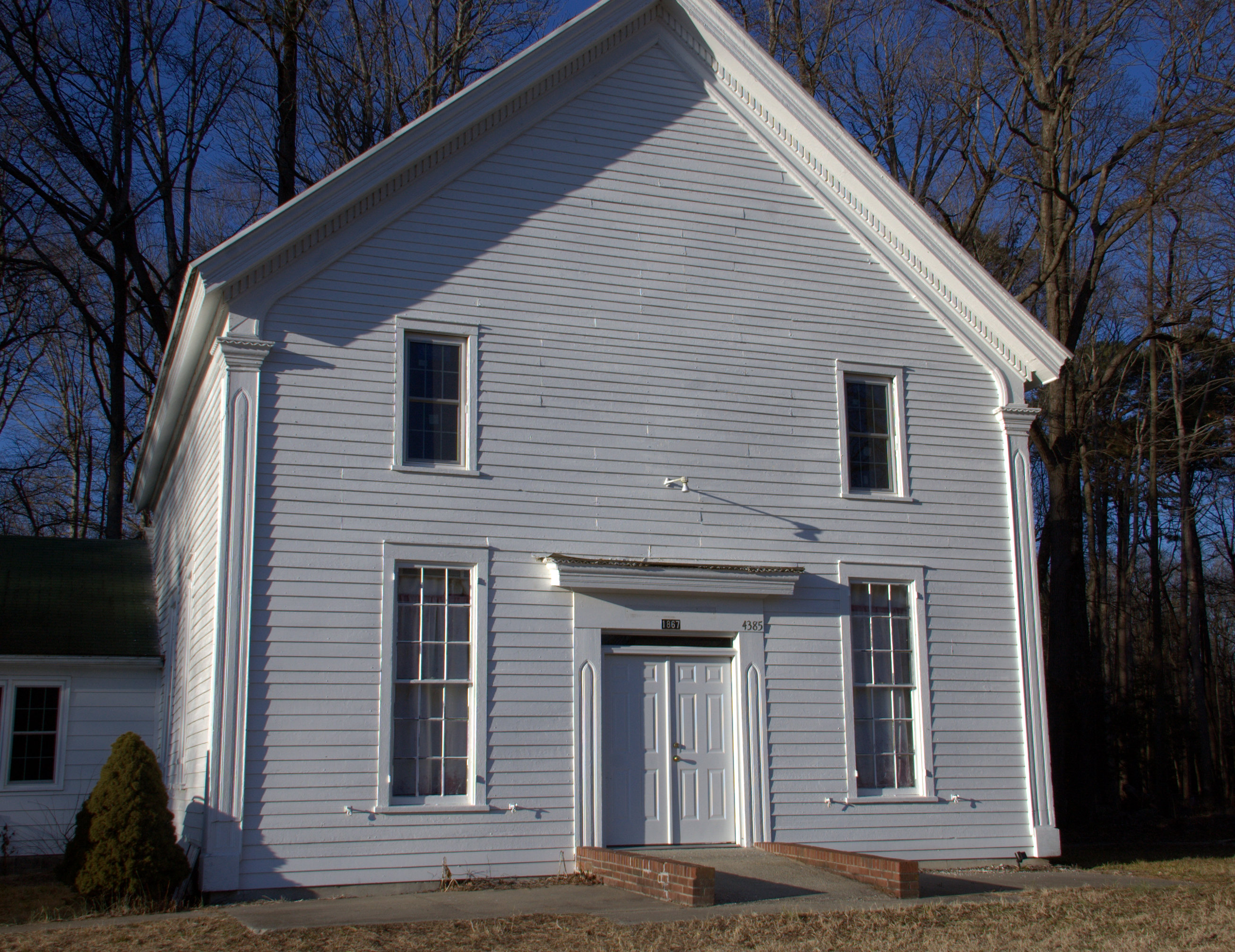

- Location within Delaware Location within the United States
- Location: Northwest of Bridgeville on Road 31, near Bridgeville, Delaware
- Coordinates: 38°45′13″N 75°40′41″W
- Area: less than one acre
- Built: 1885
- Architectural style: Gothic
- NRHP reference No.: 78000916
- Added to NRHP: May 05, 1978

Trinity Methodist Episcopal Church is a historic Methodist Episcopal church located near Bridgeville, Sussex County, Delaware. It was built in 1885, and is a two-story, frame church building in the Gothic Revival style. It has a gable roof and corner pilasters with lancet insets. Attached to the church is a Sunday School annex.

It was added to the National Register of Historic Places in 1978.
