= Eratt House =

Historic house in Delaware, United States

- U.S. National Register of Historic Places
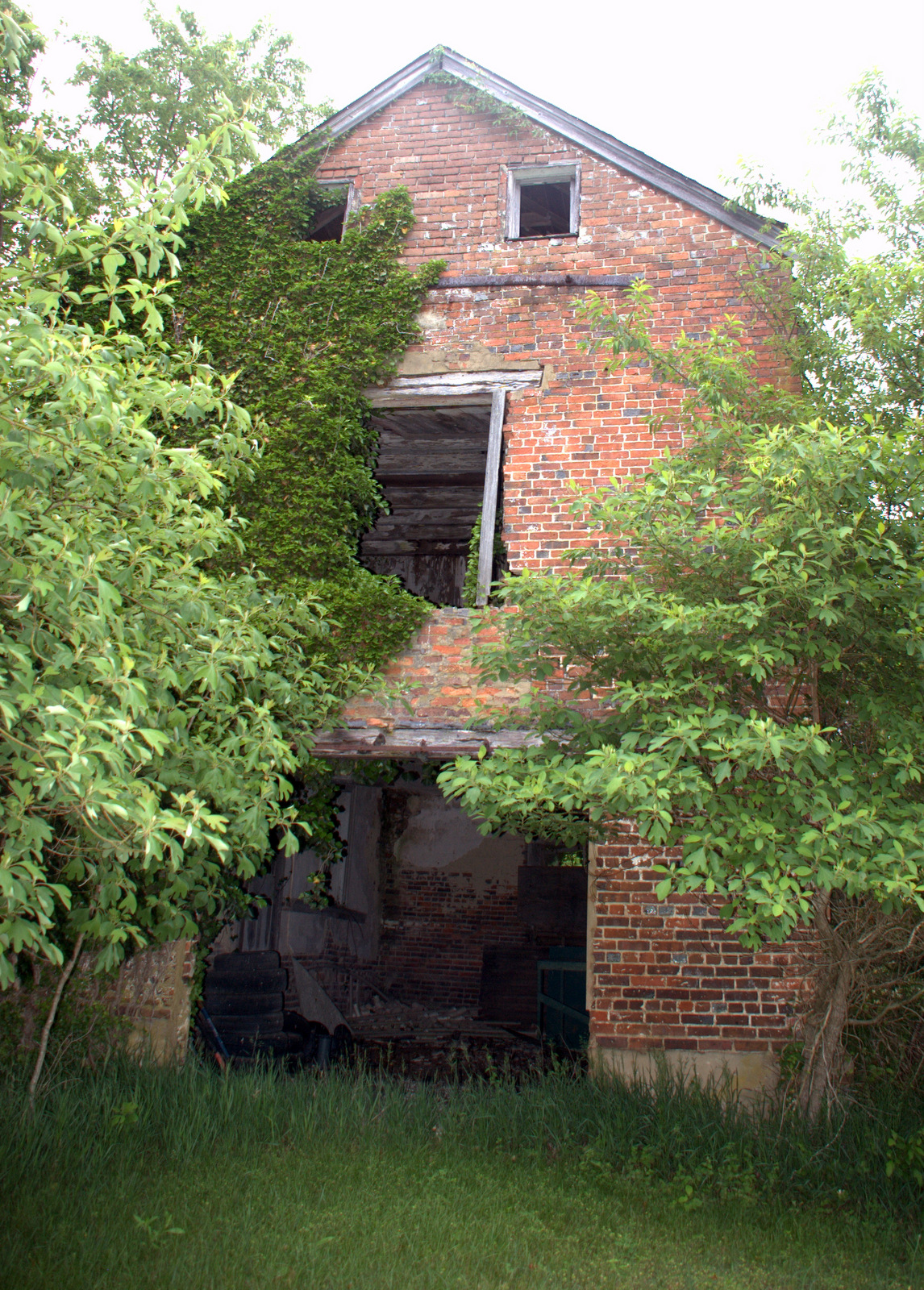

- Location within Delaware Location within the United States
- Location: West of Bridgeville on Road 572 500 ft. East of Road 569 Intersection, near Bridgeville, Delaware
- Coordinates: 38°45′21″N 75°42′40″W
- Area: 0.5 acres (0.20 ha)
- Built: c. 1750
- NRHP reference No.: 83001409
- Added to NRHP: October 29, 1983

Eratt House is a historic home located near Bridgeville, Sussex County, Delaware. It was built about 1750, and is a two-story, three-bay, single-pile brick structure with a gable roof. The house is in the hall-and-parlor plan. The house was converted for use as a garage. It is one of only about a dozen surviving 18th-century brick houses in Sussex County.

It was added to the National Register of Historic Places in 1983.

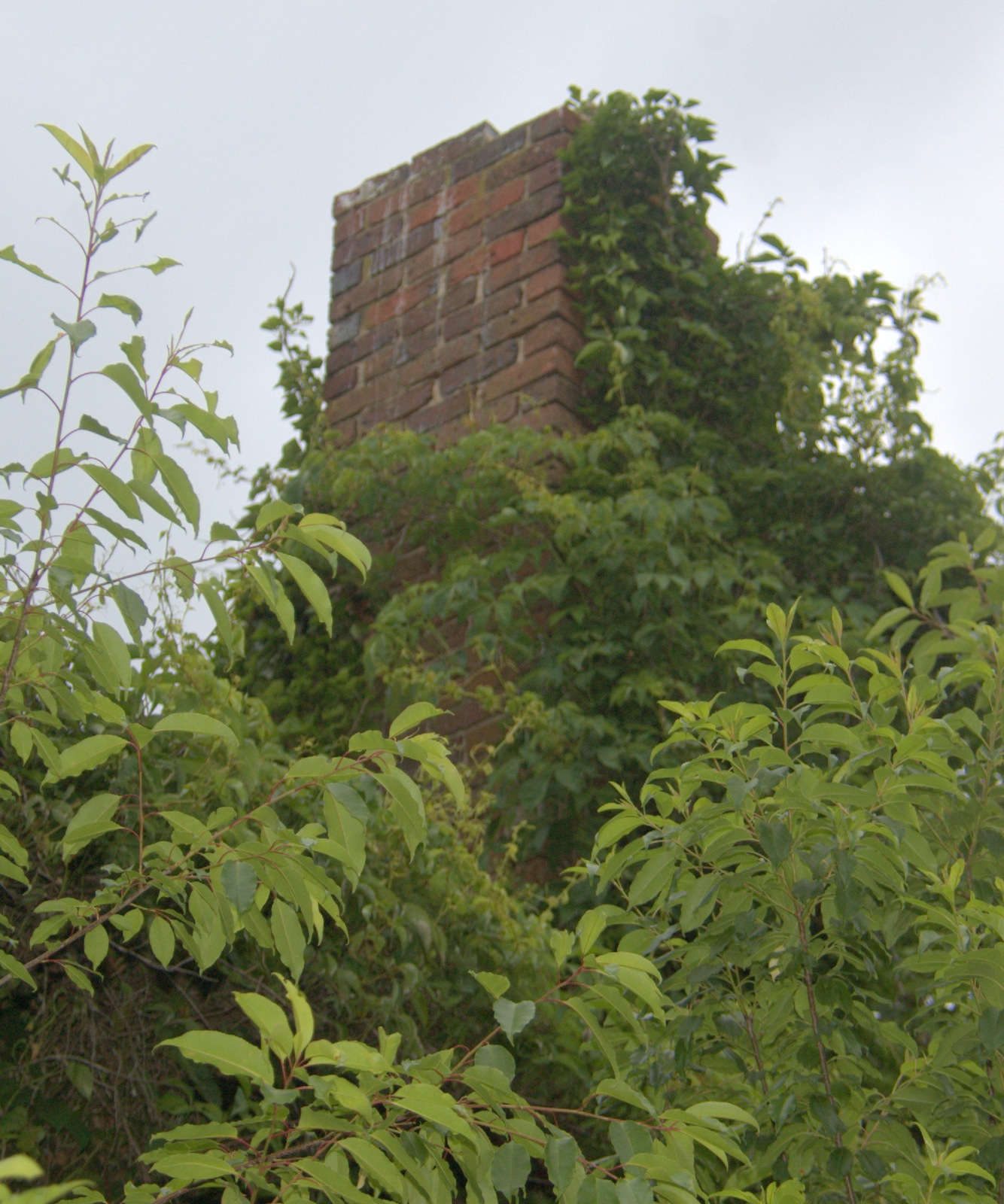
Chimney overgrown with vines
