= Lyman Pierson Powell =

American clergyman and educationalist (1866–1946)

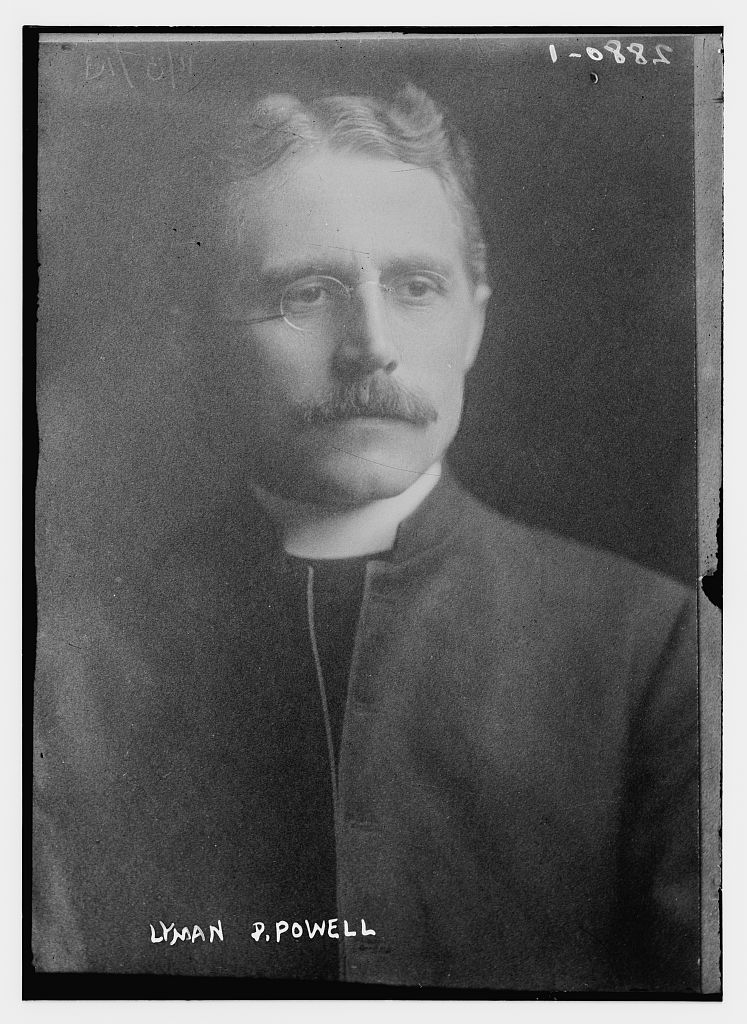
- Powell, c. 1910–1915
- Born: September 21, 1866; Farmington, Delaware
- Died: February 10, 1946 (aged 79); Morristown, New Jersey
- Occupations: Episcopal clergyman, writer

Lyman Pierson Powell (September 21, 1866 - February 10, 1946) was an American Episcopal clergyman and college president. Powell was originally a critic of Christian Science but later became a sympathizer and wrote an authorized biography of its founder.

== Biography ==
He was born in Farmington, Delaware. He graduated from Johns Hopkins University in 1890, studied at the University of Wisconsin–Madison, the University of Pennsylvania, and the Philadelphia Divinity School where he graduated in 1897. He was ordained a priest in 1898. He became president of Hobart College and of William Smith College (Geneva, New York) in 1913.

He died in Morristown, New Jersey at the Morristown Memorial Hospital on February 10, 1946.

Fellow minister Rev. Dr. Charles S. Macfarland wrote a biography of Powell in 1947.

== Christian Science ==
Powell wrote a critical book, denouncing Christian Science in 1907. The book described Christian Science as "neither Christian nor scientific." Powell's own biographer, Charles S. Macfarland, wrote that this first book on the subject "it was clear, had been written in a spirit of extreme irritation."

Powell later changed his position, stopped being antagonistic towards Christian Science, and wrote another biography of Mary Baker Eddy in 1930 which presented her and the religion she founded in a positive way. This change was the result of interactions with Christian Scientists. Before writing the new book, Powell told Macfarland, "Mary Baker Eddy should be made known to the world - through the medium of one who was neither her disciple nor her enemy." He traveled to Boston, and despite his previous negative book, the Mother Church gave him access to their extensive archives; in hope that the biography would rebut the recent criticisms of Edwin Franden Dakin. Macfarland described Powell as a "warm sympathizer" of Christian Science.

Originally published by Macmillan, it was later revised and published by The Christian Science Publishing Society in 1950 and 1991. The new book became an authorized biography printed by the Christian Science Publishing Society and was sold in Christian Science Reading Rooms.

Ernest Sutherland Bates, a critic of Christian Science, negatively reviewed Powell's 1930 biography commenting "His method of vindicating Mrs. Eddy is simply to ignore all the charges against her including those which he himself has made." Bates noted that Powell's criticisms of Eddy that he made in 1907 such as the accusations of indebtedness to Phineas Quimby do not appear in his later biography.

== Selected publications ==
=== Author ===
- The History of Education in Delaware (1893)
- Family Prayers (1905)
- Christian Science: The Faith and its Founder (1907)
- The Art of Natural Sleep (1908)
- The Emmanuel Movement in a New England Town (1909)
- Heavenly Heretics (1909)
- Mary Baker Eddy: The Second Seventy
- The Spirit of Democracy (1918)
- The Social Unrest; Capital Labor, and the Public in Turmoil (1919)
- Mary Baker Eddy: A Life Size Portrait (MacMillan, 1930)
  - Reprinting: Mary Baker Eddy (Christian Science Publishing Society, 1991)

=== Editor ===
- American Historic Towns (four volumes, 1898–1902): Southern States, Western States
- Current Religious Literature (1902); Devotional Series (three volumes, 1905–1907)
