= Delaware Fightin' Blue Hens women's basketball =

American women's college basketball team

2026–27 Delaware Fightin' Blue Hens women's basketball team
- University: University of Delaware
- First season: 1971
- Head coach: Sarah Jenkins (5th season)
- Location: Newark, Delaware
- Arena: Acierno Arena at the Bob Carpenter Center (capacity: 5,000)
- Conference: Conference USA
- Nickname: Blue Hens
- Colors: Royal blue and gold

NCAA Division I tournament Sweet Sixteen
- 2013

NCAA Division I tournament appearances
- 2001, 2007, 2012, 2013, 2022

Conference tournament champions
- ECC: 1989, 1990, 1991; America East: 2001; CAA: 2012, 2013, 2022

Conference regular-season champions
- ECC: 1984, 1989, 1990, 1991; America East: 2001; CAA: 2005, 2012, 2013, 2021

Uniforms
Home	Away

The Delaware Fightin' Blue Hens women's basketball is the team that is playing basketball while they are representing University of Delaware in Newark, Delaware. The school's team currently competes in Conference USA (CUSA).

== History ==
Delaware began play in 1971. In the 2011–12 and 2012–13 seasons, they went undefeated in CAA play, going 18–0 twice in that span. They won their first ever NCAA Tournament game in 2012, beating Little Rock 73–42 before losing in the ensuing round to Kansas 70–64. They made the regional semifinals in the 2013 NCAA Division I women's basketball tournament after beating West Virginia 66–53 and North Carolina 78–69 before losing to Kentucky 69–62. Elena Delle Donne played for the Blue Hens from 2009 to 2013, scoring 3,039 points, good for 9th in the all-time list. As of the end of the 2020–21 season, the Fightin' Blue Hens have an all-time record of 820–552.

== Season record ==
Season	Coach	Overall	Conference	Standing	Postseason
Susana Occhi () (1969–1971^{a})
1969-70	Susana Occhi	1-5			
Susana Occhi:		1-5 (.167)			
Mary Ann Hitchens () (1971^{b}–1978)
1970-71	Mary Ann Hitchens	4-5			
1971-72	Mary Ann Hitchens	8-4			3rd Place, EAIAW Regionals
1972-73	Mary Ann Hitchens	9-5			3rd Place, EAIAW Regionals
1973-74	Mary Ann Hitchens	8-7			3rd Place, Mid-Atlantic Regionals
1974-75	Mary Ann Hitchens	12-5			3rd Place, EAIAW Regionals
1975-76	Mary Ann Hitchens	12-6			3rd Place, EAIAW Regionals
1976-77	Mary Ann Hitchens	9-9			3rd Place, EAIAW Regionals
1977-78	Mary Ann Hitchens	12-6			2nd Place, EAIAW Regionals
Mary Ann Hitchens:		74-47 (.612)			
Joyce Perry () (1978–1982)
1978-79	Joyce Perry	6-11			
1979-80	Joyce Perry	7-13			
1980-81	Joyce Perry	21-7			
1981-82	Joyce Perry	9-14			
Joyce Perry (East Coast Conference) (1982–1991)
1982-83	Joyce Perry	12-12	4-4	1st, ECC West	
1983-84	Joyce Perry	22-4	8-0	1st	
1984-85	Joyce Perry	19-9	11-3	2nd	
1985-86	Joyce Perry	15-15	8-6	3rd	
1986-87	Joyce Perry	10-17	5-9	6th	
1987-88	Joyce Perry	18-11	9-5	3rd	
1988-89	Joyce Perry	23-6	13-1	1st	
1989-90	Joyce Perry	21-9	10-4	1st	
1990-91	Joyce Perry	18-11	10-2	1st	
Delaware (East Coast):		158-94 (.627)	78-34(.696)		
Joyce Perry (North Atlantic Conference) (1991–1996)
1991-92	Joyce Perry	15-14	7-7	4th	
1992-93	Joyce Perry	17-11	8-6	4th	
1993-94	Joyce Perry	10-17	7-7	5th	
1994-95	Joyce Perry	12-15	5-10	7th	
1995-96	Joyce Perry	11-16	9-9	5th	
Delaware (North Atlantic):		65-73(.471)	36-39(.480)		
Joyce Perry:		266-212 (.556)	114-73 (.610)		
Tina Martin (America East Conference) (1996–2001)
1996-97	Tina Martin	9-19	6-12	7th	
1997-98	Tina Martin	6-21	3-15	10th	
1998-99	Tina Martin	16-11	10-8	5th	
1999-00	Tina Martin	21-8	13-5	3rd	
2000-01	Tina Martin	26-5	17-1	1st	NCAA 1st Round
Delaware (America East):		78–64 (.549)	49–41 (.544)		
Tina Martin (Colonial Athletic Association) (2001–2017)
2001-02	Tina Martin	23-7	15-3	2nd	WNIT 1st Round
2002-03	Tina Martin	22-9	15-3	T-1st	WNIT 1st Round
2003-04	Tina Martin	19-10	10-8	4th	
2004-05	Tina Martin	25-6	16-2	1st	WNIT 1st Round
2005-06	Tina Martin	22-8	13-5	3rd	WNIT 1st Round
2006-07	Tina Martin	26-6	16-2	T-2nd	NCAA 1st Round
2007-08	Tina Martin	7-24	6-12	9th	
2008-09	Tina Martin	15-15	7-11	9th	
2009-10	Tina Martin	21-12	11-7	4th	WNIT 1st Round
2010-11	Tina Martin	20-14	10-8	T-5th	WNIT 1st Round
2011-12	Tina Martin	31-2	18-0	1st	NCAA 2nd Round
2012-13	Tina Martin	32-4	18-0	1st	NCAA Sweet Sixteen
2013-14	Tina Martin	20-11	10-6	3rd	WNIT 1st Round
2014-15	Tina Martin	15-17	8-10	7th	
2015-16	Tina Martin	16-15	10-8	5th	
2016-17	Tina Martin	16-14	10-8	5th	
Delaware (CAA):		330–174 (.655)	193–93 (.675)		
Tina Martin:		408-238 (.632)	242-134 (.644)		
Natasha Adair (Colonial Athletic Association) (2017–2021)
2017-18	Natasha Adair	19-13	11-7	5th	WNIT 1st Round
2018-19	Natasha Adair	16-15	11-7	T-3rd	
2019-20	Natasha Adair	12-17	8-10	6th	
2020-21	Natasha Adair	24-5	16-2	1st	WNIT Semifinals
Natasha Adair:		71-50 (.587)	46-26 (.639)		
Total:		820-552 (.598)			
National champion Postseason invitational champion Conference regular season champion Conference regular season and conference tournament champion Division regular season champion Division regular season and conference tournament champion Conference tournament champion

- ^aSusan Occhi was only the coach for one season, 1969 to 1970, however all of the games were played in 1970, and she remained coach until being replaced by Mary Ann Hitchens. See also Note B.
- ^bMary Ann Hitchens began as the coach during the 1970 to 1971 school year, however, all of the games for that school year were played in 1971. She had been the 1969-70 freshman team coach and moved up to coach varsity at the beginning of 1971, for the 1970–1971 school year. See also Note A.

== Postseason ==
=== NCAA tournament ===
The Blue Hens have appeared in the NCAA tournament five times. They have a record of 3–5.

Year	Seed	Round	Opponent	Result
2001	#13	First Round	#4 NC State	L 57–76
2007	#12	First Round	#5 Michigan State	L 58–69
2012	#3	First Round; Second Round	#14 Arkansas-Little Rock #11 Kansas	W 73–42; L 64–70
2013	#6	First Round; Second Round; Sweet Sixteen	#11 West Virginia #3 North Carolina #2 Kentucky	W 66–53; W 78–69; L 62–69
2022	#13	First Round	#4 Maryland	L 71–102

=== WNIT tournament ===
The Blue Hens have appeared in the WNIT Tournament nine times. They have a record of 3–9.

Year	Round	Opponent	Result
2002	First Round	George Washington	L 71–78
2003	First Round	Saint Joseph's	L 47–65
2005	First Round	St. John's	L 42–56
2006	Second Round	Pittsburgh	L 57–64
2010	First Round	Richmond	L 49–67
2011	First Round	Toledo	L 55–58
2014	First Round	Rutgers	L 61–65
2018	First Round	Georgetown	L 57–67
2021	First Round; Second Round; Quarterfinals; Semifinals	Fordham; Clemson; Villanova; Rice	W 77–49; W 87–74; W 77–70; L 75–85

== See also ==
- Delaware Fightin' Blue Hens men's basketball
