= Scott's Store =

- U.S. National Register of Historic Places
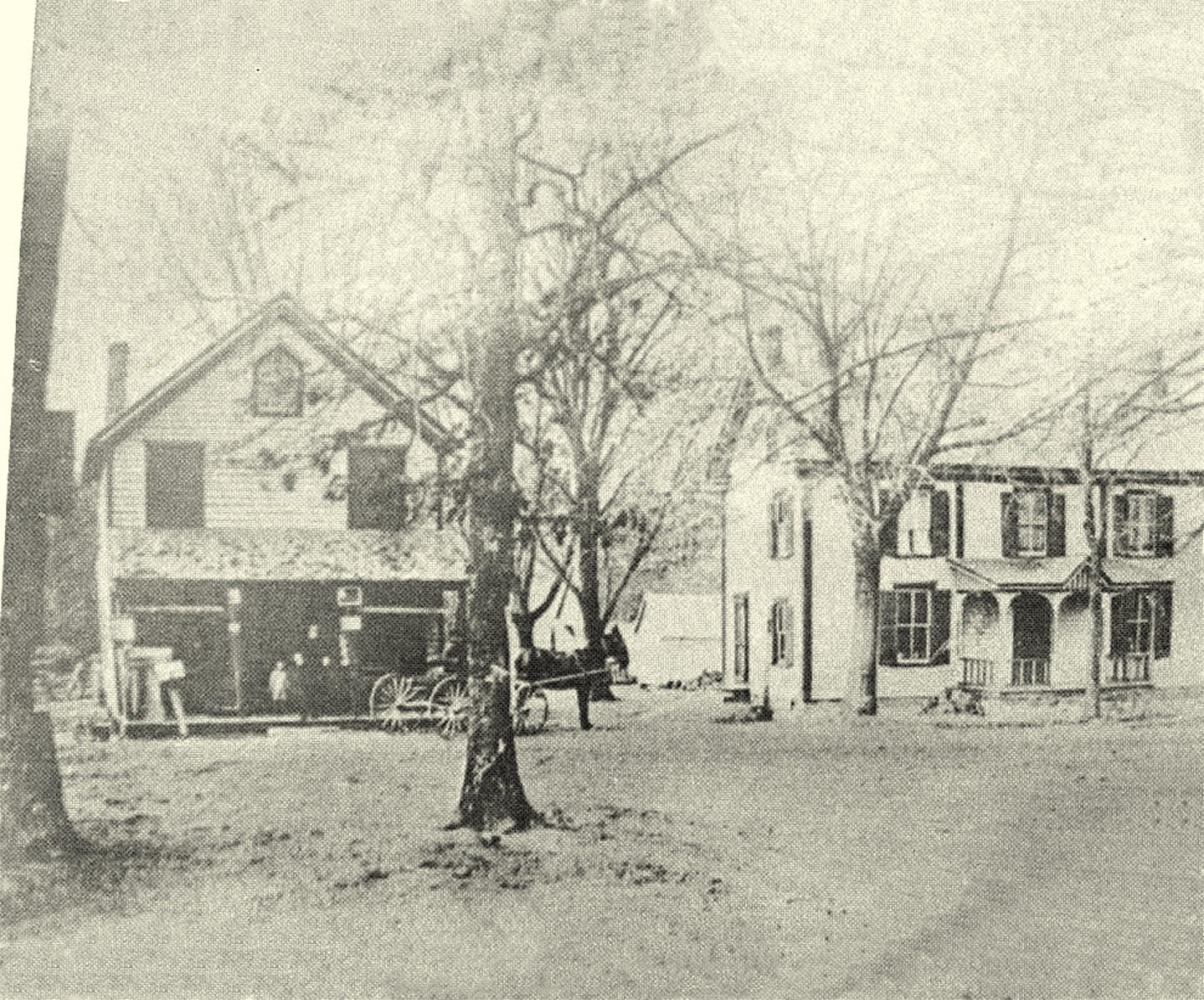

- Location within Delaware Location within the United States
- Location: Northwest of Bridgeville on Delaware Route 404, near Bridgeville, Delaware
- Coordinates: 38°46′49″N 75°40′4″W
- Area: 0.3 acres (0.12 ha)
- Built: 1875
- Architectural style: Gothic
- NRHP reference No.: 83001412
- Added to NRHP: October 29, 1983

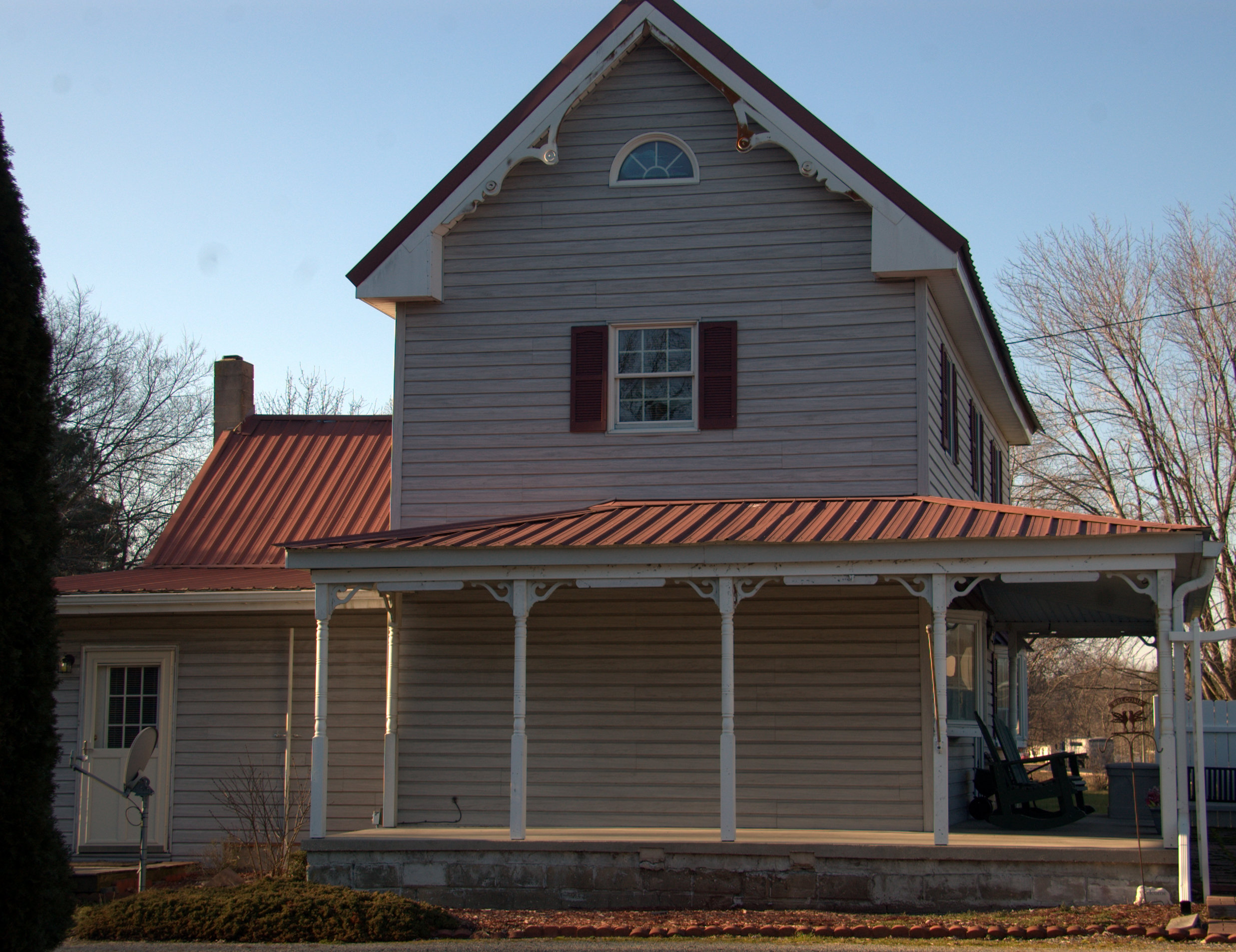

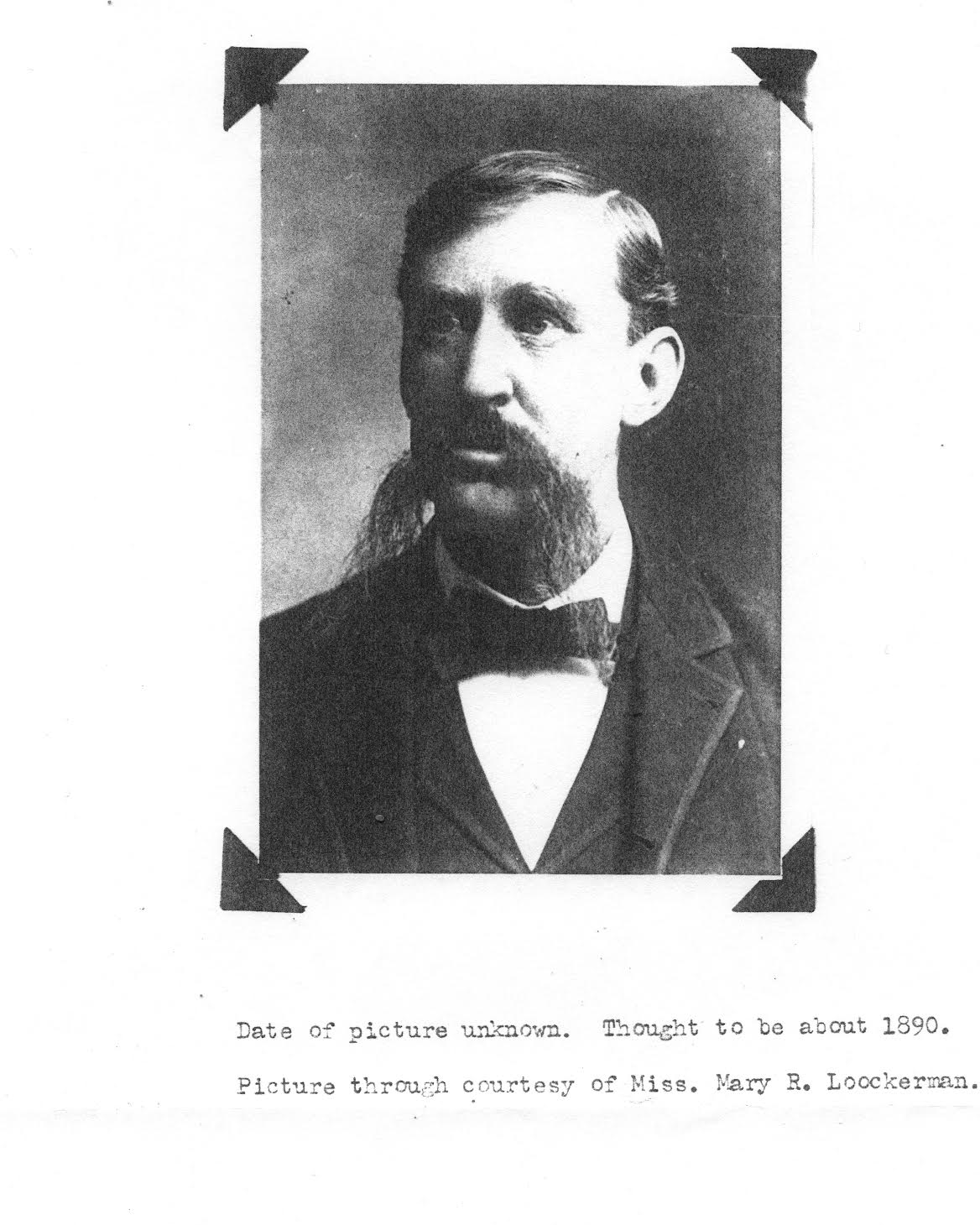
Charles M. Scott, circa 1890

Scott's Store was a historic commercial building located near Bridgeville, Delaware.

The general store, now demolished, was built in 1875 and located at Scott's Corner at the intersection of Delaware Rt. 404 and Delaware Rt. 36.

The original proprietor, Charles Manlove Scott, opened the store seven days per week at 4 a.m. Scott, born in 1858, was a founder of the Bridgeville Bank of the Baltimore Trust Company in 1904. He retired from the store in 1915 and served as bank director until his death in 1933. Roland F. Melson was the first person outside the Scott family to own the store.

The building was a two-story, rectangular, frame structure in a simplified Victorian Gothic style. It sat on a brick foundation, was sheathed in weatherboard, and had a gable roof. The storefront had a pair of double doors and a large one-story, hipped porch roof extending across the face of the building. Also on the property was a contributing garage and outhouse, and a submerged round metal tank used to mix carbide gas. It was typical of 19th-century country stores of southern Delaware.

It was added to the National Register of Historic Places in 1983.
