= Andrewville, Delaware =

Unincorporated community in Delaware, United States

- Unincorporated community
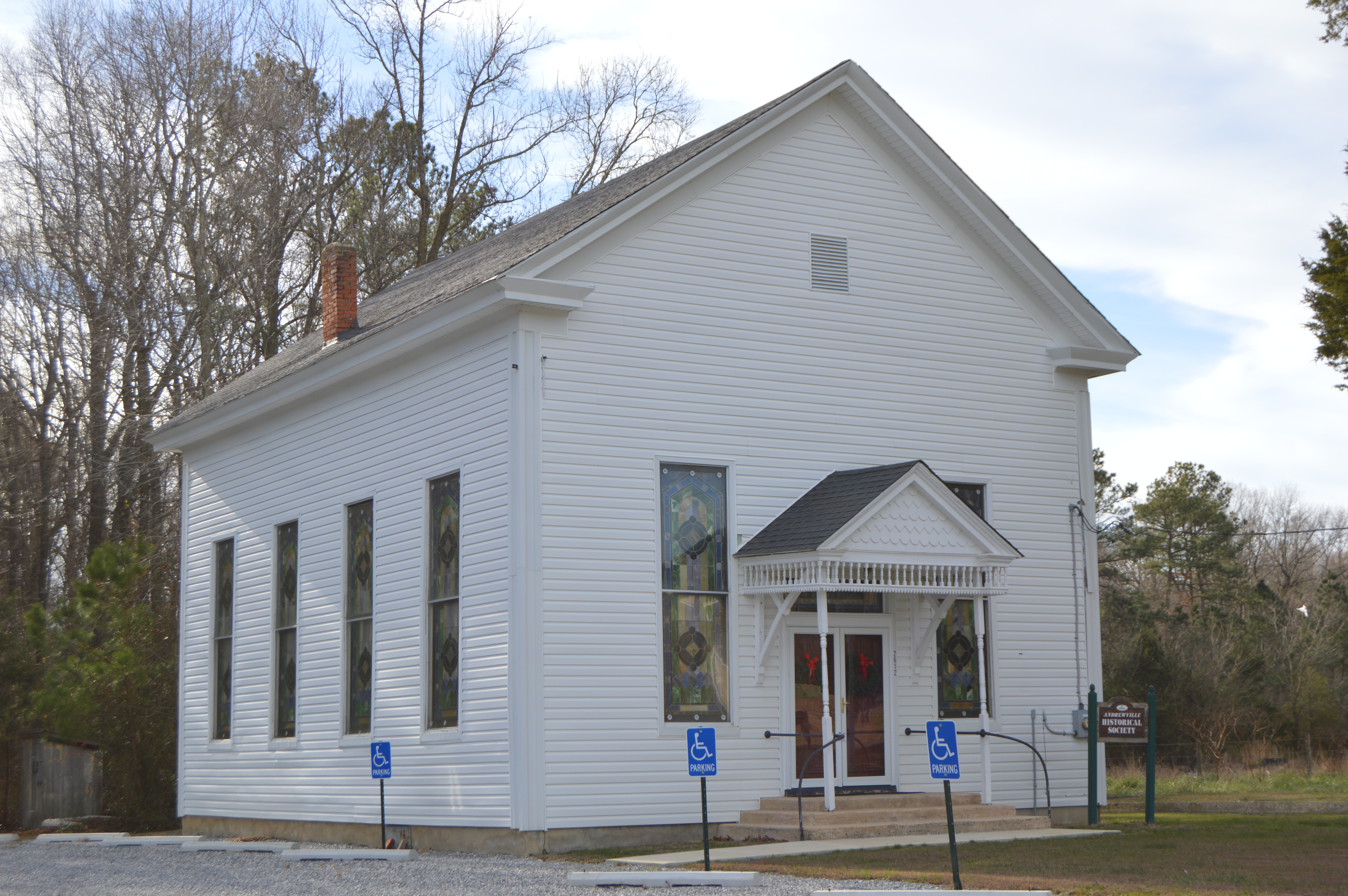
- Former Bethel Methodist Protestant Church

- Location within the state of Delaware Andrewville, Delaware (the United States)
- Coordinates: 38°51′41″N 75°38′06″W
- Country: United States
- State: Delaware
- County: Kent
- Elevation: 52 ft (16 m)
- Time zone: UTC-5 (Eastern (EST))
  - Summer (DST): UTC-4 (EDT)
- GNIS feature ID: 216017

Andrewville is an unincorporated community in Kent County, Delaware, United States. Its elevation is 52 ft (16 m) and is located at 38°51′41″N 75°38′06″W. It is located west of Farmington on Andrewville Road.

== History ==
Andrewville's population was 54 in 1900.

The Bethel Methodist Protestant Church was added to the National Register of Historic Places in 1998.
