= Ricards House–Linden Hall =

Historic house in Delaware, United States

- U.S. National Register of Historic Places
- Location within Delaware Location within the United States
- Nearest city: Bridgeville, Delaware
- Coordinates: 38°46′15″N 75°35′35″W
- Area: 4.2 acres (1.7 ha)
- Architectural style: Classical Revival, Federal, Colonial Vernacular
- NRHP reference No.: 82002360
- Added to NRHP: August 26, 1982

The Ricards House–Linden Hall near Bridgeville, Delaware, USA, also known as Conaway House, is a historic house that was builtin five sections between 1731 and the mid-1960s. It includes a distinctive two story veranda built in the 1850s in the style of a pre-Civil War plantation house.

The house was listed on the National Register of Historic Places in 1982.

The architecture includes Classical Revival, Federal, and Colonial Vernacular styles.

The house, at the northeast corner of US Route 13 and Fawn Road (County Road 600), has been demolished, according to satellite imagery.
