= Sudler House =

Historic house in Delaware, United States

- U.S. National Register of Historic Places
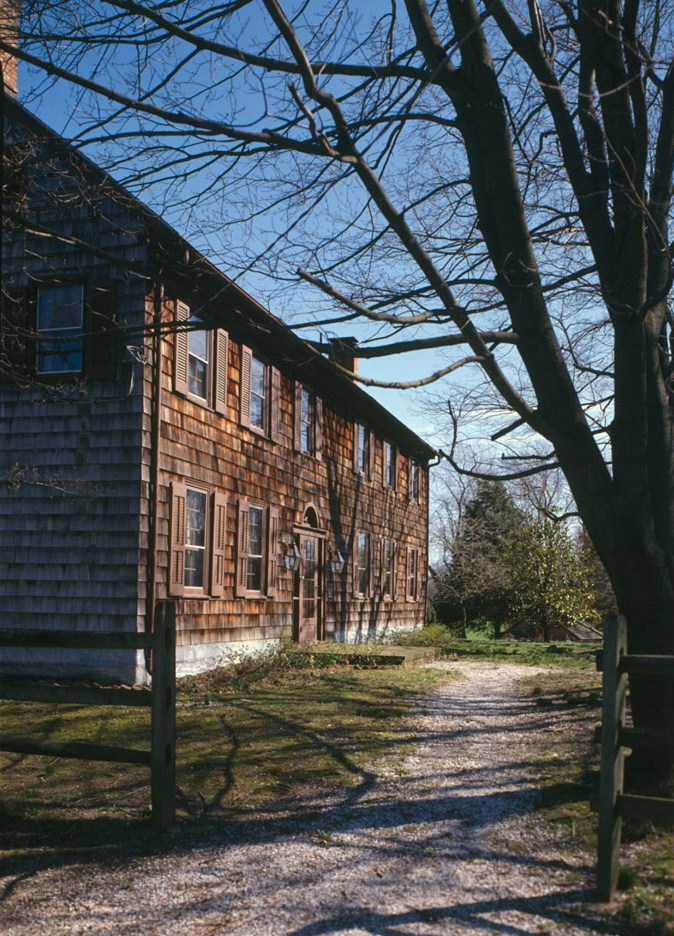
- HABS Photo, July 1982

- Location within Delaware Location within the United States
- Location: N. Main St., Bridgeville, Delaware
- Coordinates: 38°44′50″N 75°35′58″W
- Area: 5 acres (2.0 ha)
- Built: c. 1750
- Architectural style: Federal
- NRHP reference No.: 74000606
- Added to NRHP: December 31, 1974

Sudler House is a historic home located in Bridgeville, Sussex County, Delaware. Constructed originally around 1750, the house features a two-story, six-bay frame structure sheathed in cypress shingles and exhibits elements of vernacular architecture. The initial three-bay section of the house was expanded during the Federal period, resulting in the current six-bay facade.

Inside, the Sudler House boasts a number of distinctive architectural details, including a beautifully designed staircase featuring square balusters, with an unusual double carved bracket trim and a paneled base.

The Sudler family held ownership of the property from 1833 until 1971, demonstrating its long-standing significance in the region's history. The property was added to the National Register of Historic Places on December 31, 1974.

== See also ==
- National Register of Historic Places listings in Sussex County, Delaware
