= Bridgeville Public Library =

Historic building in Delaware, US

- U.S. National Register of Historic Places
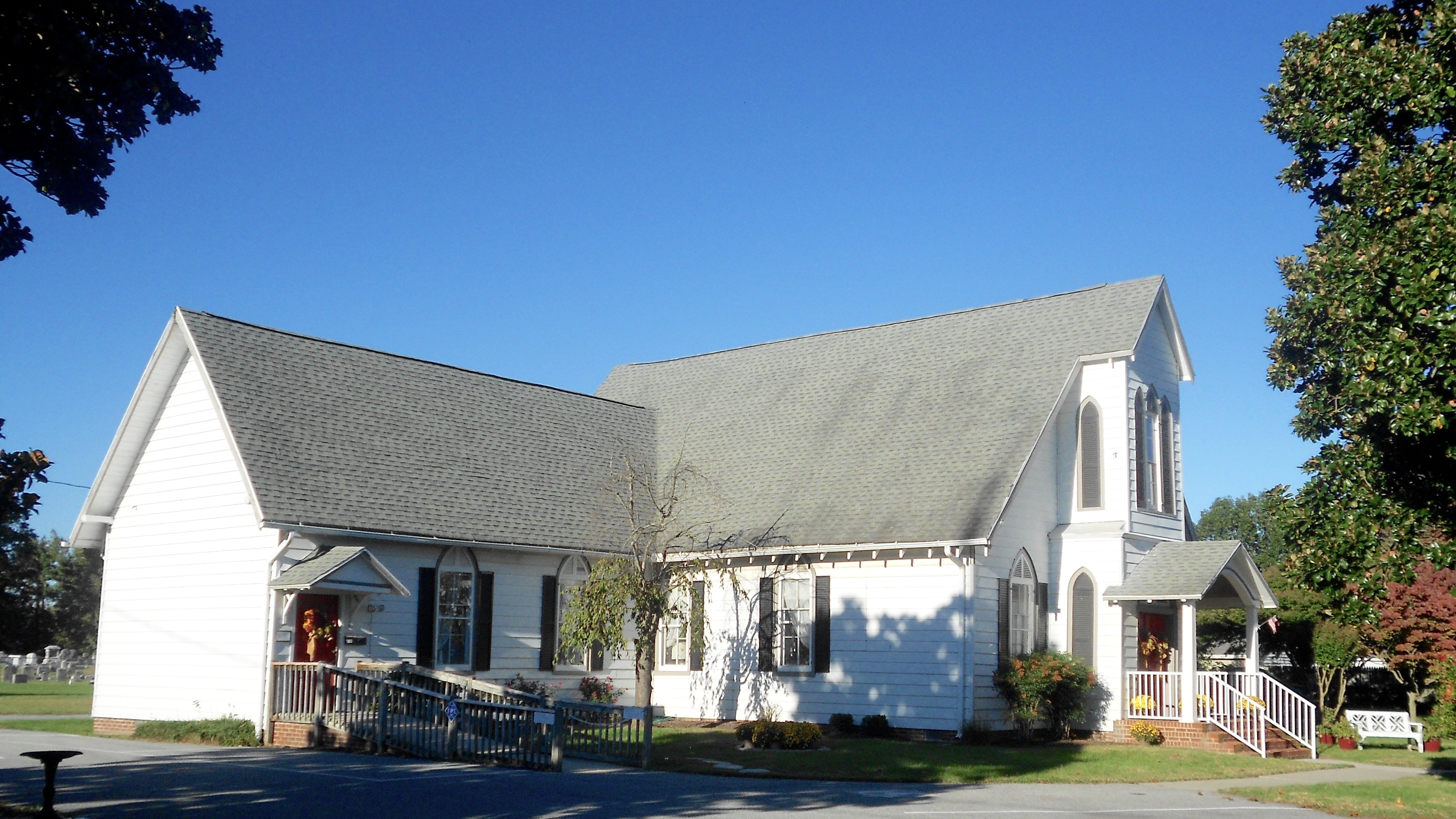

- Location within Delaware Location within the United States
- Location: 600 South Cannon Street., Bridgeville, Delaware
- Coordinates: 38°44′36″N 75°36′10″W
- Area: 0.5 acres (0.20 ha)
- Built: 1866
- Architectural style: Modern
- NRHP reference No.: 90001065
- Added to NRHP: July 23, 1990

Bridgeville Public Library was housed in a historic library building located in Bridgeville, Sussex County, Delaware. It was built in 1866, and is a 1 1/2-story, three-bay, frame structure in the Gothic Revival style. It has a steeply pitched gable roof. There is a one-story gable roofed wing and one-story rear addition. To the front there is a two-story, gable-roofed bell tower and a gable-roofed Colonial Revival open portico. It was originally built to provide a place of worship for the First Presbyterian Church of Bridgeville. In 1917, the Tuesday Night Club bought the building. In 1919, the club's Literary Guild organized a circulating library and in 1964, the Tuesday Night Club signed the building over to the Town of Bridgeville for use as a library. The new 13,500 square foot library was opened in 2009.

It was added to the National Register of Historic Places in 1990.

== See also ==
- National Register of Historic Places listings in Sussex County, Delaware
