= Tharp House (Farmington, Delaware) =

Historic house in Delaware, United States

- U.S. National Register of Historic Places
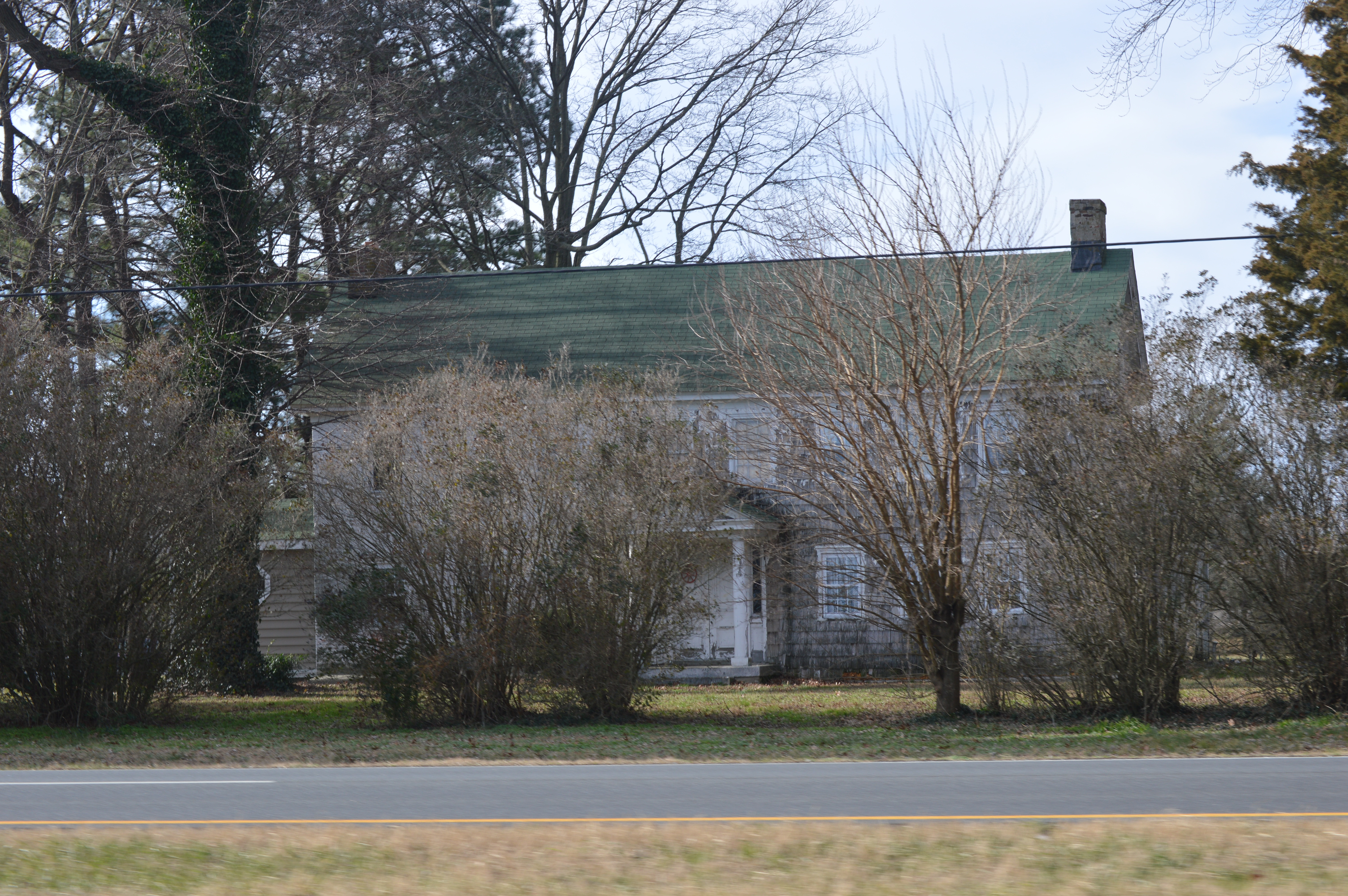
- Front of the house

- Location within Delaware Location within the United States
- Location: East of Farmington on U.S. Route 13, near Farmington, Delaware
- Coordinates: 38°52′17″N 75°34′35″W
- Area: 1 acre (0.40 ha)
- Built: 1742, 1847
- NRHP reference No.: 73000491
- Added to NRHP: March 20, 1973

Tharp House is a historic home located near Farmington, Kent County, Delaware, United States; it was the home of Delaware Governor William Tharp (1803–1865). It is a 2 1/2-story, four-bay frame structure, with a three-bay brick rear portion. It also has a rear wing, which is thought to have been a kitchen outbuilding joined to the main body of the house.

It was listed on the National Register of Historic Places in 1973.
