= Old Bridgeville Fire House =

- U.S. National Register of Historic Places
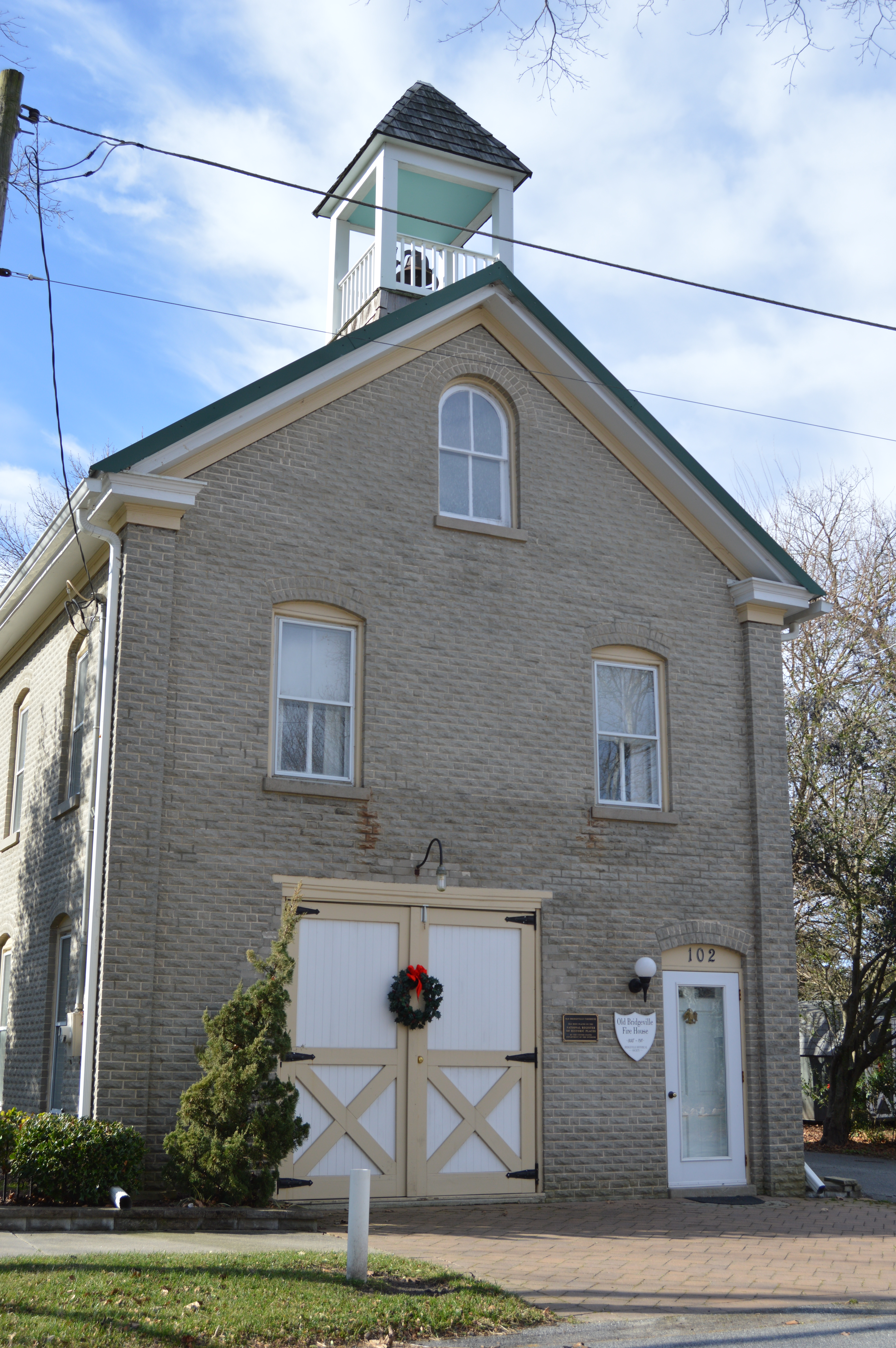
- Front of the firehouse

- Location within Delaware Location within the United States
- Location: 102 William St., Bridgeville, Delaware
- Coordinates: 38°44′34.5″N 75°36′4″W
- Area: Less than 1 acre (0.40 ha)
- Built: 1911
- NRHP reference No.: 84000856
- Added to NRHP: August 9, 1984

Old Bridgeville Fire House is a historic fire station located in Bridgeville, Sussex County, Delaware. It was built in 1911, and is a two-story, rectangular, concrete brick structure in a vernacular style. The building measures 25 feet wide by 35 feet deep. It has a gable roof and features corner pilasters, a segmentally arched window and door openings, and a simple cupola-bell tower. After the fire company sold the building in 1928, it was used for many years for storage until it was acquired by the Bridgeville Historical Society in 1977.

It was added to the National Register of Historic Places in 1984.
