= Bridgeville, Delaware =

- Town
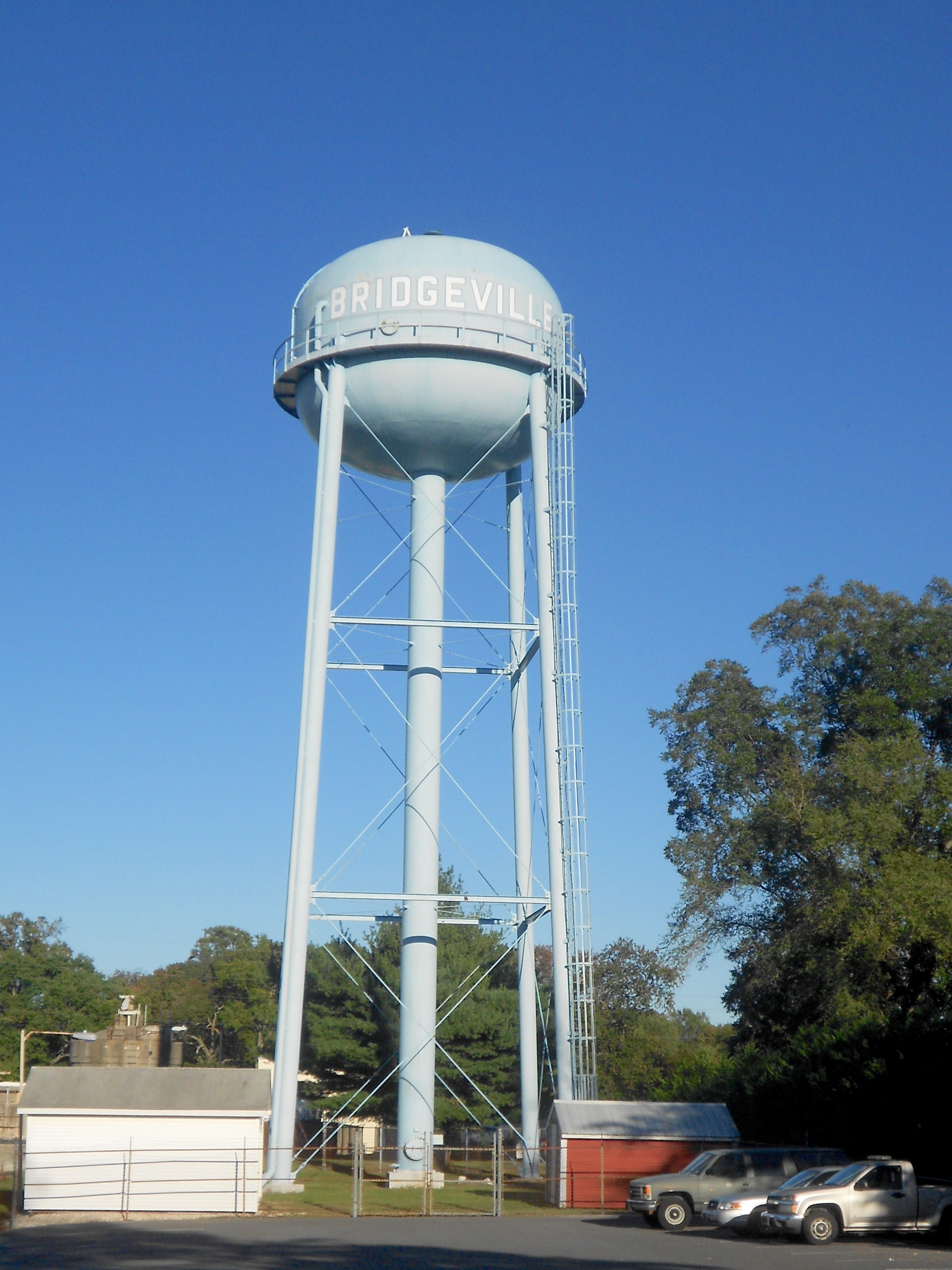
- Water tower

- Seal
- Motto: "If you lived here, you would be home now."
- Location of Bridgeville in Sussex County, Delaware

- Location of Sussex County in Delaware Bridgeville (the United States)
- Coordinates: 38°44′33″N 75°36′16″W
- Country: United States
- State: Delaware
- County: Sussex

Area
  - Total: 4.82 sq mi (12.49 km^{2})
  - Land: 4.82 sq mi (12.49 km^{2})
  - Water: 0 sq mi (0.00 km^{2})
- Elevation: 43 ft (13 m)

Population (2020)
  - Total: 2,568
  - Density: 532.6/sq mi (205.65/km^{2})
- Time zone: UTC−5 (Eastern (EST))
  - Summer (DST): UTC−4 (EDT)
- ZIP Code: 19933
- Area code: 302
- FIPS code: 10-08680
- GNIS feature ID: 213706
- Website: Town of Bridgeville Delaware

Bridgeville is a town in Sussex County, Delaware, United States. According to the 2020 census, the population is 2,568. It is part of the Salisbury, Maryland-Delaware Metropolitan Statistical Area.

== History ==
The town of Bridgeville is the oldest community in western Sussex County. Records of land transactions which were made in the first quarter of the 18th century suggest that a significant agricultural community already existed in the area by that period. A small group of houses had been built along the present Main Street by the turn of the 19th century; this settlement was known as "Bridge Branch" for the nearby stream, which was crossed by a bridge as early as 1730. By 1804, the community had grown sufficiently to merit the establishment of a post office.

The village was formally recognized in 1810, when an Act of the Assembly was passed to establish its name as "Bridgeville". Early 19th century industries included a water-powered mill, tanyard, charcoal furnace, and fruit-drying business. The growth of the town accelerated greatly upon the arrival of the Delaware Railroad in Bridgeville in 1856. The town was subsequently laid out for development by William Cannon (1809–1865).

Bridgeville's population was 613 in 1900.

Bridgeville was named for a bridge that was built in 1730 that was located over a tributary of the Nanticoke River.

The Bridgeville Historic District, Bridgeville Public Library, Old Bridgeville Fire House, and Sudler House are listed on the National Register of Historic Places. A number of buildings in the surrounding rural areas are also listed including Eratt House, Ricards House-Linden Hall, Scott's Store, and Trinity Methodist Episcopal Church.

== Transportation ==
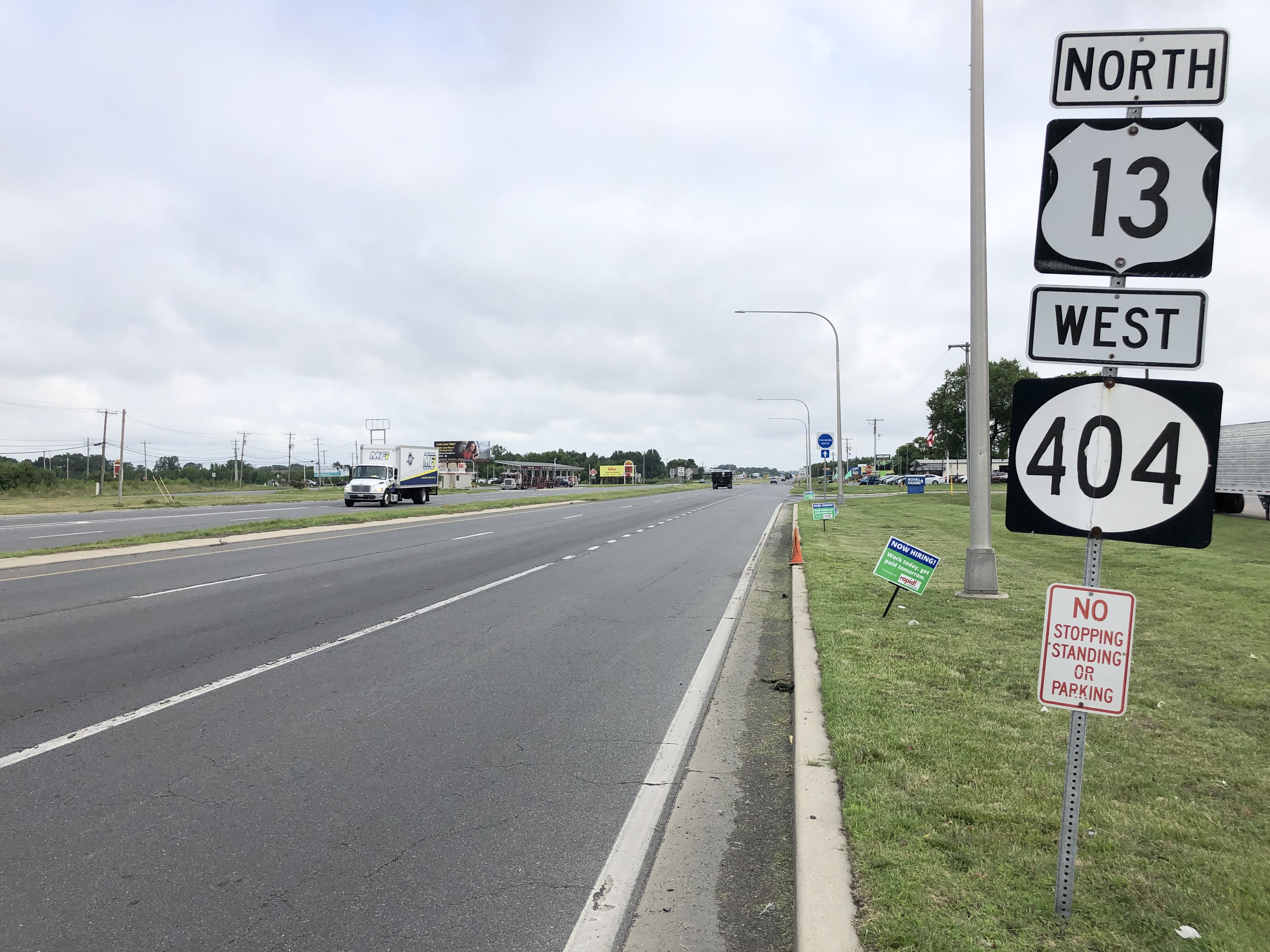
US 13 northbound/DE 404 westbound on the edge of Bridgeville

Roads are the main means of transport to and from Bridgeville. U.S. Route 13 (Sussex Highway) is the primary north–south highway serving the town, connecting northward to Dover and southward to Salisbury.

Delaware Route 404 is the main east–west highway serving Bridgeville, heading east towards Georgetown and west towards Maryland. The two roads are concurrent for part of their route through Bridgeville as they both bypass the center of town to the north and east. U.S. Route 13 Business and Delaware Route 404 Business follow their respective original alignments through the center of town.

DART First State operates the Route 212 bus that connects Bridgeville with Delmar and Georgetown. The Delmarva Central Railroad's Delmarva Subdivision line passes north–south through Bridgeville.

== Geography ==
Bridgeville is located at 38°44′33″N 75°36′16″W (38.7426137, –75.6043714).

According to the U.S. Census Bureau, the town has a total area of 0.8 square miles (2.1 km^{2}), all of which is land.

== Demographics ==
Historical population
Census	Pop.	Note	%±
1860	250		—
1870	300		20.0%
1880	398		32.7%
1890	576		44.7%
1900	613		6.4%
1910	939		53.2%
1920	945		0.6%
1930	987		4.4%
1940	1,180		19.6%
1950	1,468		24.4%
1960	1,469		0.1%
1970	1,317		−10.3%
1980	1,238		−6.0%
1990	1,210		−2.3%
2000	1,436		18.7%
2010	2,048		42.6%
2020	2,568		25.4%
U.S. Decennial Census

=== 2020 census ===
As of the 2020 census, Bridgeville had a population of 2,568. The median age was 59.7 years. 18.9% of residents were under the age of 18 and 42.5% of residents were 65 years of age or older. For every 100 females there were 88.5 males, and for every 100 females age 18 and over there were 85.2 males age 18 and over.

96.8% of residents lived in urban areas, while 3.2% lived in rural areas.

There were 1,138 households in Bridgeville, of which 21.3% had children under the age of 18 living in them. Of all households, 53.3% were married-couple households, 12.6% were households with a male householder and no spouse or partner present, and 28.6% were households with a female householder and no spouse or partner present. About 23.1% of all households were made up of individuals and 15.4% had someone living alone who was 65 years of age or older.

There were 1,301 housing units, of which 12.5% were vacant. The homeowner vacancy rate was 2.0% and the rental vacancy rate was 9.6%.

Racial composition as of the 2020 census
Race	Number	Percent
White	1,720	67.0%
Black or African American	452	17.6%
American Indian and Alaska Native	12	0.5%
Asian	36	1.4%
Native Hawaiian and Other Pacific Islander	0	0.0%
Some other race	166	6.5%
Two or more races	182	7.1%
Hispanic or Latino (of any race)	347	13.5%

=== 2000 census ===
At the 2000 census, there were 1,436 people, 570 households, and 381 families living in the town. The population density was 1,768.6 inhabitants per square mile (682.9/km^{2}). There were 636 housing units at an average density of 783.3 per square mile (302.4/km^{2}). The racial makeup of the town was 55.85% White, 31.55% African American, 0.28% Native American, 0.70% Asian, 8.91% from other races, and 2.72% from two or more races. Hispanic or Latino of any race were 16.64%.

Of the 570 households 33.9% had children under the age of 18 living with them, 40.7% were married couples living together, 20.9% had a female householder with no husband present, and 33.0% were non-families. 27.4% of households were one person and 12.1% were one person aged 65 or older. The average household size was 2.52 and the average family size was 3.02.

The age distribution was 28.7% under the age of 18, 8.8% from 18 to 24, 27.0% from 25 to 44, 19.4% from 45 to 64, and 16.0% 65 or older. The median age was 33 years. For every 100 females, there were 90.7 males. For every 100 females age 18 and over, there were 85.8 males.

The median household income was $26,579 and the median family income was $30,083. Males had a median income of $25,536 versus $20,298 for females. The per capita income for the town was $14,965. About 24.9% of families and 27.4% of the population were below the poverty line, including 42.5% of those under age 18 and 13.9% of those age 65 or over.

== Education ==
Most of Bridgeville is situated in the Woodbridge School District, while a small portion is in the Seaford School District. The Woodbridge district's high school is Woodbridge High School and the Seaford district's high school is Seaford Senior High School.

== Arts and culture ==
Bridgeville is home to the Apple Scrapple Festival and was formerly home to the World Championship Punkin Chunkin.

== Notable people ==
- Thurman Adams Jr., Democratic member of the Delaware Senate; born in Bridgeville
- William F. Allen, Democratic member of the Delaware General Assembly and the United States House of Representatives; born in Bridgeville
- Philip L. Cannon, first Lieutenant Governor of Delaware (1901–1905) and son of William Cannon; born in Bridgeville
- William Cannon, served in the Delaware General Assembly and as Governor of Delaware during much of the Civil War; born in Bridgeville
- Peter F. Causey, Governor of Delaware from 1855 to 1859
- Edward Willis Redfield, impressionist painter
