= Conrad Schools of Science =

Location
- 201 Jackson Avenue; Wilmington, Delaware 19804; United States; 39°43′22″N 75°36′05″W

Information
- Type: Public high school
- Motto: Doing It The Conrad Way!
- School district: Red Clay Consolidated School District
- CEEB code: 080228
- NCES School ID: 100130000270
- Principal: Kendra Todd-Dixon
- Teaching staff: 63.00 (FTE)
- Grades: 6–12
- Enrollment: 1,163 (2023–2024)
- Student to teacher ratio: 18.46
- Colors: Scarlet and gray
- Mascot: Red Wolves
- Newspaper: The Conrad Howler
- Website: conrad.redclayschools.com

Conrad Schools of Science is a public high school in unincorporated New Castle County, Delaware, United States and has a Wilmington postal address. It opened in 1935 as the Henry C. Conrad High School before closing in 1978 to become the middle school; existing students were bussed to Wilmington High School. It reopened in 2007 as the magnet school Conrad Schools of Science. It is one of seven high schools in the Red Clay Consolidated School District and offers grades six through twelve.

== Student life ==
=== Athletics ===
Conrad is a part of the Diamond State Athletic Conference.

=== Mascot ===
In 2015, after her complaints about the atmosphere of discrimination toward people of color that existed in the school, a high school senior named Deja'rene Harris (class of 2015) was tasked with forming a committee to address these issues. The name given to the group was the Diversity Committee. When the weekly meeting notes were discovered by the Alumni Association of Conrad Schools of Science, many were shocked to see that there were talks about the appropriateness of using the "Redskins" mascot - one that had been used already for 80 years of the school's history. The Diversity Committee noted that this mascot was seen as offensive and was another one of the many indicators of the school's difficult relationship with communities of color.

These comments sparked outrage within the Alumni Association at the perceived insults to their beloved mascot. At the request of the school's administrators including the then-principal Mark Pruitt and then-vice principal Andy Vincent, the Diversity Committee began hosting meetings with the Alumni Association regarding these issues. Members of the committee, including Dejarene Harris, Lisa Holden ('15) and Yasmine Allen ('15) with the company of other teachers and parents, broke off into a new group called the Retire the Mascot Committee.

The Retire the Mascot Committee's mission statement centered on "[promoting] a cultural understanding for the retirement of our current Conrad Schools of Science mascot and [to] select a yet to be named, new mascot, that will proudly represent our school, our community, and our history". The group, led by the aforementioned 3 young women, held weekly meetings with the Alumni Association with each group taking and defending their stance - The Alumni Committee voting to keep the "Redskin" mascot and the Retire the Mascot Committee, of course, fighting to abolish it.

The meetings garnered far more attention than expected, gaining support on both sides from students, teachers, area locals, various news outlets, and native groups. The issue was never resolved within the school and the students that led the movement graduated in Spring of 2015, putting an end to the meetings, but not to the discussion. In June 2016, the issue was put to a vote by the Red Clay School Board who voted 4–2 in favor of the change. In early 2017, the public voted overwhelmingly for its replacement to be the Red Wolves.

Although the disagreement was resolved officially with the vote, the new Red Wolves mascot was adopted with enthusiasm by the student body and staff at the time of the change, and the school has been heavily redecorated with the new mascot - the issue is still a sensitive matter to some. Many members of the Alumni Association still choose to use the old headdress or 'Indian chief' logo of the school and others have started a movement called "Redskins Forever" - whose bumper stickers, hoodies, and other paraphernalia can be seen around the surrounding area.

== Notable alumni ==
- Dallas Green (class of 1952), late MLB player, manager, scout, and executive
- Celia Kaye (class of 1959), actress
- David McBride (class of 1960), President pro tempore and member of the Delaware Senate
