= Woodbridge High School (Delaware) =

Coordinates: 38°44′24″N 75°36′03″W

Information
- School district: Woodbridge School District
- Superintendent: Dr Kevin Long
- Principal: Ms. Terri Sharpe
- Assistant Principal: Ms. Allison Alpaugh
- Teaching staff: 47.00 (FTE)
- Enrollment: 687 (2023-2024)
- Capacity: c.700
- Student to teacher ratio: 14.62
- Area: 15,100 m^{2}
- Colors: Blue, gray, and white
- Website: www.woodbridgeblueraiders.com/o/whs

Woodbridge High School is a public high school in unincorporated Sussex County, Delaware, with a Greenwood postal address. It is part of the Woodbridge School District.

== School structure ==
As of the 2019-2020 school year, enrollment was 727 students and there were 75 faculty members.

The students go by the name of the "Blue Raiders". The school colors are blue, gray, and white.

Communities served by the district include the majority of Bridgeville and all of Greenwood in Sussex County and all of Farmington in Kent County.

== History ==
The school was formerly in the Bridgeville city limits. The district spent $52.5 million to build the current building, which opened in 2014.

== Facility ==
The current facility has 162,000 square feet (15,100 m^{2}) of space and a capacity of 700 students. It has an 800-seat auditorium and a 1,100+-seat gymnasium.
