= Spring Garden Street =

Spring Garden Street could refer to:

- An east–west street in Philadelphia, Pennsylvania
- Spring Garden Street station, a disused commuter rail station in Philadelphia
- Spring Garden Street Bridge, a highway bridge in Philadelphia
- A street in the north inner city area of Dublin, Ireland

== See also ==
- Spring Garden (disambiguation)
