= Spring Garden =

Spring Garden may refer to:

== Places ==
=== Canada ===
- Spring Garden, Halifax, in Nova Scotia

=== Guyana ===
- Spring Garden, Guyana

=== Hong Kong ===
- Spring Garden Lane

=== United Kingdom ===
- Spring Gardens, a small street in London containing government buildings, near Whitehall

=== United States ===
- Spring Garden, Alabama, an unincorporated community
- Spring Garden, California, an unincorporated community
- Spring Garden (Laurel, Delaware), historic site in Laurel, Delaware
- Spring Garden, Florida, the former name of DeLeon Springs, Florida
- Spring Garden (Miami), a neighborhood in Miami, Florida
- Spring Garden-John Leavell, Bryantsville, KY, listed on the NRHP in Kentucky
- Discovery-Spring Garden, Maryland, two communities combined in a Census-designated place
- Spring Garden, Missouri, an unincorporated community
- Spring Garden, Philadelphia, Pennsylvania, a neighborhood in Philadelphia
  - Spring Garden District, Pennsylvania, a defunct district of Philadelphia County before consolidation of the city
  - Spring Garden College, a defunct private technical college in Spring Garden, Philadelphia
  - Spring Garden School No. 1, Philadelphia, PA, listed on the NRHP in Philadelphia, Pennsylvania
  - Spring Garden School No. 2, Philadelphia, PA, listed on the NRHP in Philadelphia, Pennsylvania
- Spring Garden (Pittsburgh), Pennsylvania
- Spring Garden Township, Pennsylvania
- Spring Garden-Terra Verde, Texas, a census-designated place

== Others ==
- The Parsonage Garden at Nuenen, or Spring Garden, oil painting by Vincent van Gogh
- Spring Garden, a 2024 South Korean film

== See also ==
- Spring Garden station (disambiguation)
- Spring Gardens
