= Meg Saligman =

American artist

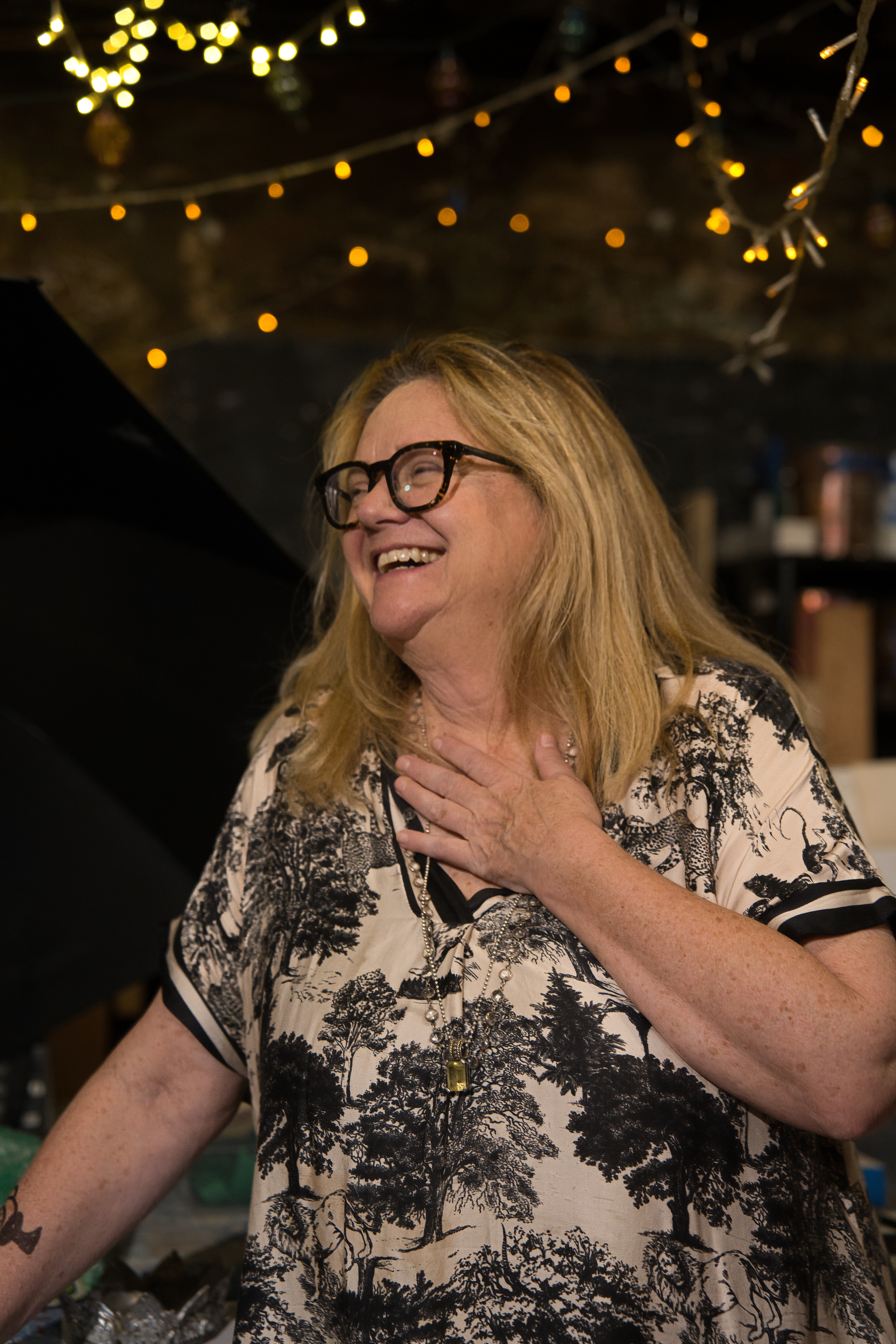
- Saligman in 2026
- Born: 1965 (age 60–61); Olean, New York
- Known for: Muralist
- Website: https://www.megsaligman.com/

Meg Saligman is an internationally recognized American artist. She is best known for large scale murals and has painted more than fifty murals internationally, including several of the largest murals in the United States. The artist is known for mixing classical and contemporary aspects of painting, and for her community centered process. Saligman's seminal murals were painted in the late 1990s-early 2000s are credited as exceptionally influential to the contemporary mural movement. Her work resides as permanent public art all over the world, but is also part of private collections including the Johnson and Johnson works on paper collection and the Rutgers University Museum of Fine Arts print collection.

== Early life and education ==
Saligman grew up in the small town of Olean, New York. In high school she helped to paint one of the murals in Olean. Saligman's first independent mural was painted on the front of a sweater factory that no longer exists. It was owned by a man that is now her husband. She attended Washington University in St. Louis where she earned a degree in painting, graduating as the Valedictorian of her program's class.

== Art ==
Saligman is known for mixing classical and contemporary painting techniques with an emphasis on figurative compositions with abstract accents. Her practice is focused on community, collaboration, and site specificity. Saligman's process often relates to themes of social practice in contemporary art, with the idea that exchange is essential between the viewer or participant, the artist, and the artwork. Saligman was one of, if not the, first muralist to utilize a grid and 'paint by numbers' approach to large scale mural painting. Saligman also popularized the use of mural cloth - where she would paint smaller sections of the mural in her studio on parachute cloth and then glue that cloth to the wall.

== Notable works ==
Saligman's public art can be divided into three distinct, but related, bodies of work: large-scale exterior murals, hybrid interior/exterior projects, and installations.

Murals

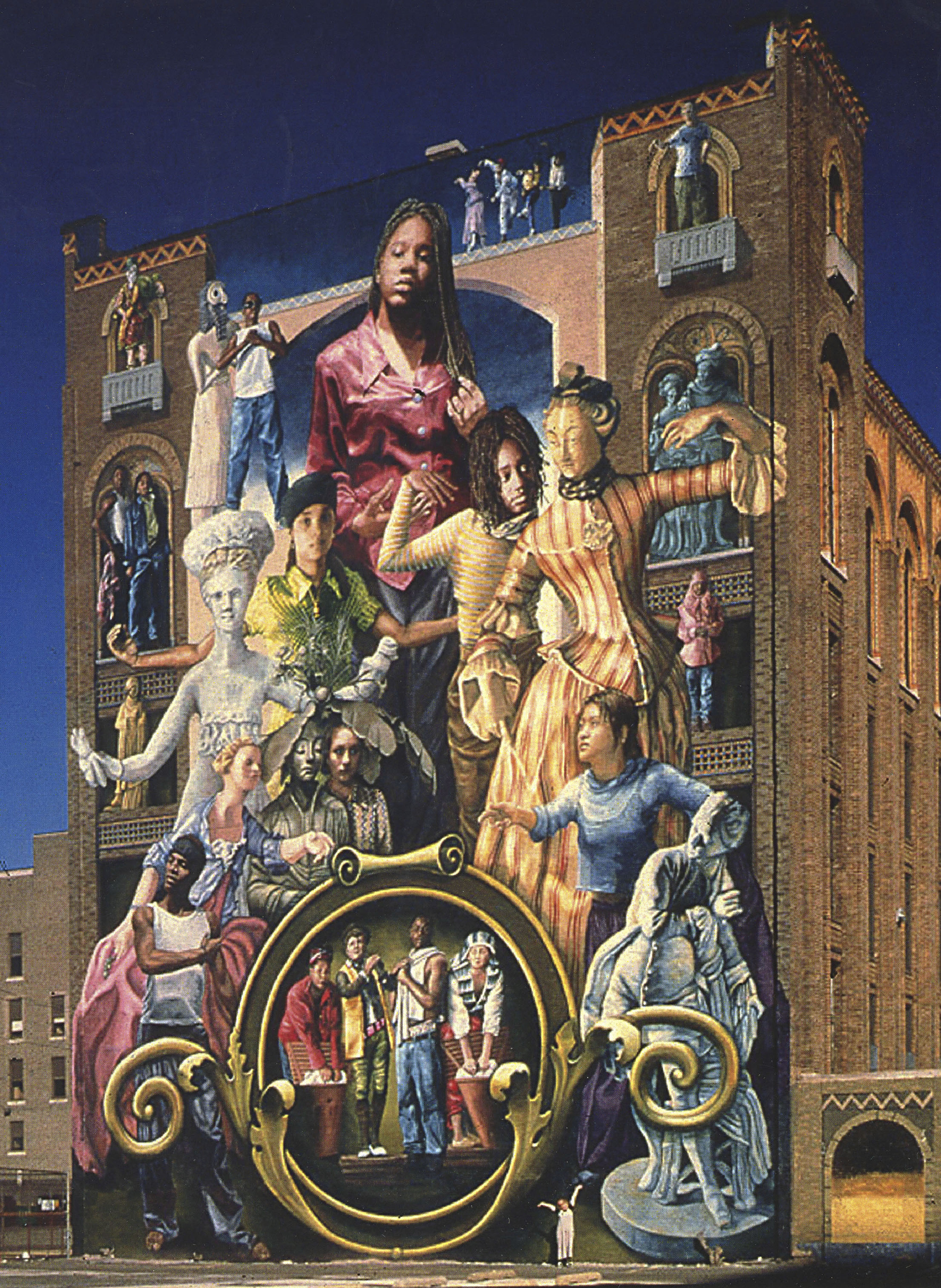
Common Threads (1998)

- We Will Not Be Satisfied Until (2015)
- Water Tower, Water Tale (2013)
- Hues of the Heart (2012)
- Magic Hour (2012)
- The Evolving Faces of Nursing (2010)
- Fertile Ground (2009)
- Passing Through (2004)
- Theater of Life (2002)
- Once in a Millennium Moon (2000)
- Common Threads (1998)

Saligman's best known mural is Common Threads located in Philadelphia. It is painted on the west wall of the old Thaddeus Stevens School of Observation at the corner of Broad and Spring Garden streets. The mural uses portraiture of local high school students alongside antique dolls owned by Saligman's grandmother to commentate on shared humanity.

Other murals include Philadelphia Muses on 13th and Locust streets, a multimedia Theatre of Life on Broad and Lombard streets, Passing Through over the Schuylkill Expressway, and the paint and LED light installation at Broad and Vine streets, Evolving Face of Nursing. Saligman's work can be viewed nationally in Shreveport, Louisiana, with Once in a Millennium Moon, and in Omaha, Nebraska, with Fertile Ground. Saligman's latest work, The MLK Mural: We Will Not be Satisfied Until on MLK Boulevard in Chattanooga, TN. The mural is the largest mural in the Southeastern United States as well as one of the five largest murals in the United States.

Architecturally integrated works

- Woven Sanctuary (2015)
- Water, Earth, Fire (2014)
- Safety Net (2012)
- The Mustard Tree (2011)

Saligman has a long-standing collaboration with the non-profit Project HOME, creating and integrating art within new subsidized housing units. This body of work explores the meaning of home with new residents who have experienced homelessness in Philadelphia. Saligman's use of stained glass, fountain features, and light installation is noted for elevating the perception of subsidized housing.

Installations

- Our Common Ground - Vote for the Good Life (2016)
- Knotted Grotto (2015)

The public installation Knotted Grotto was a commission for Pope Francis' visit to Philadelphia and the World Meeting of Families in 2015 Located at the Cathedral Basilica of Saints Peter and Paul, this artwork directly included over 150,000 public participants in its creation.

== Mural cloth technique ==
Saligman invented the “community paint day” in 2001 as a way to include thousands of community members in the making of Once in a Millennium Moon. The technique is now widespread across the mural industry. Participants paint a portion of a mural on non-woven cloth which is subsequently installed onto the mural wall using Novagel for permanent adherence.

== Awards and honors ==
Saligman was named one of the most influential American muralists by Public Art Review and has been recognized by The New York Times, artnet, The Wall Street Journal, NPR, the National Endowment for the Arts, Art in America, the Smithsonian Institution, and numerous others. In 2006 Saligman Received Philadelphia's Visionary Artist Award from the City of Philadelphia Mural Arts Program. She also received the Visionary Woman Award by the Moore College of Art in 2016.

== Personal life ==
Saligman resides in Philadelphia.
