= Spring Garden station =

Spring Garden station may refer to one of these stations in Philadelphia, Pennsylvania:

- Spring Garden station (SEPTA Metro), a rapid transit station
- Spring Garden station (Broad–Ridge Spur), a former subway station
- Spring Garden Street station, a former regional rail station

== See also ==
- Spring Garden (disambiguation)
