= Parkway Center City Middle College =

- Helen Fleischer Vocational School
- U.S. National Register of Historic Places
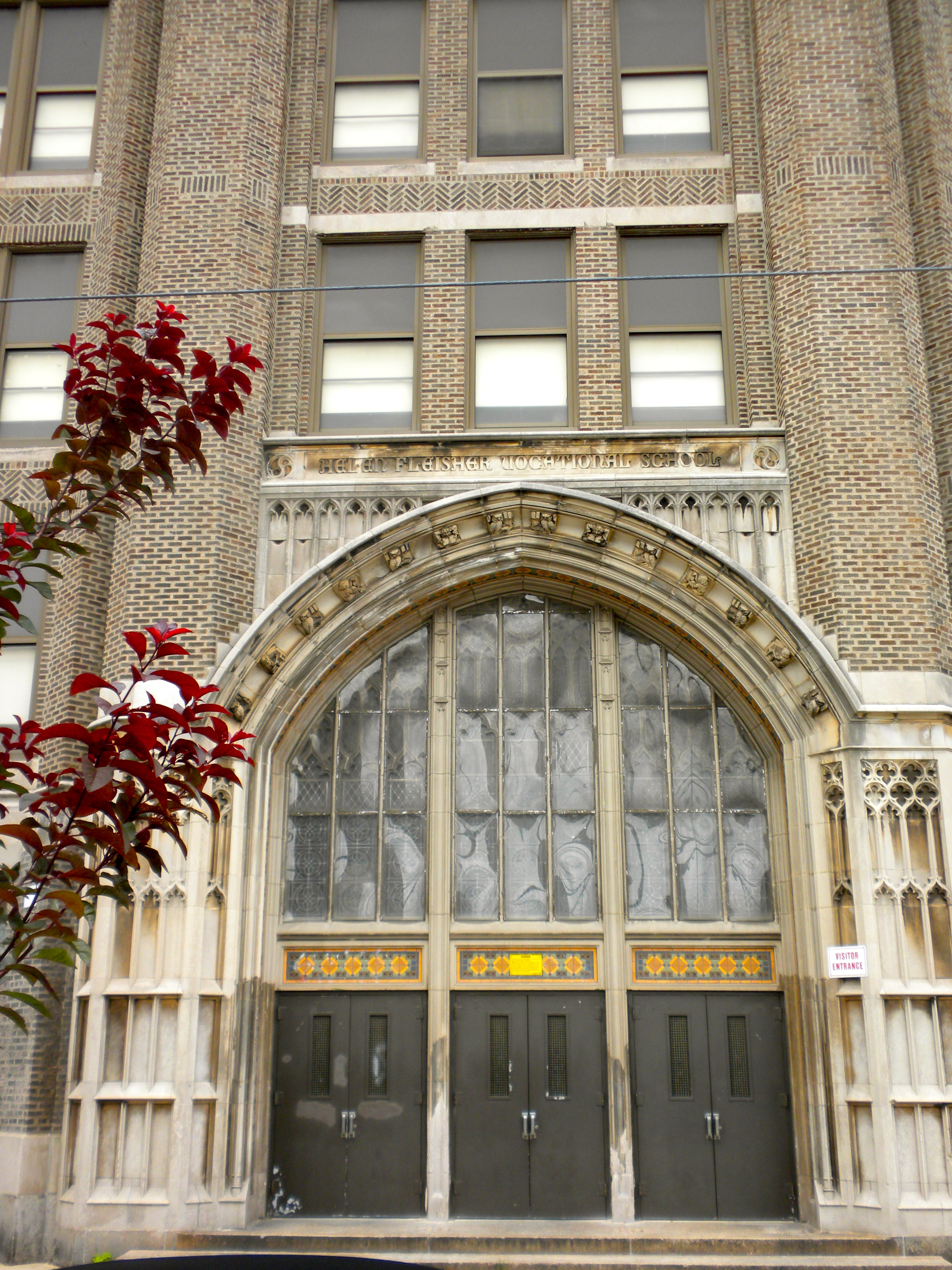
- Helen Fleischer Vocational School, August 2010

- Location within Philadelphia Location within Pennsylvania Location within the United States
- Location: 540 North 13th St., Philadelphia, Pennsylvania
- Coordinates: 39°57′47″N 75°09′34″W
- Area: 1 acre (0.40 ha)
- Built: 1925-1927
- Architect: Cassell, John D.
- Architectural style: Late Gothic Revival, Academic Gothic
- Website: https://parkwaycc.philasd.org/
- MPS: Philadelphia Public Schools TR
- NRHP reference No.: 86003282
- Added to NRHP: December 4, 1986

The Parkway Center City Middle College is the first middle college in Pennsylvania. A historic American vocational school, it is located in the Poplar neighborhood of Philadelphia. It is part of the School District of Philadelphia.

The building was added to the National Register of Historic Places in 1986 as the Helen Fleischer Vocational School.

== History and architectural features ==
This historic structure was built between 1925 and 1927 and is a brick building that was designed in the Academic Gothic style.

Prior to its current status, Parkway Center City Middle College was known as Parkway Center City and was located at 1118 Market Street. The school served as a division of the former Parkway Program, a school without walls program.

Also, this building served as the former Stoddart-Fleischer Junior High School and later Middle School until it closed in June 2003.

It was added to the National Register of Historic Places in 1986 as the Helen Fleischer Vocational School.

== Middle College ==
In 2017, Parkway Center City Middle College became the first ever Middle College school in the Commonwealth of Pennsylvania.

Parkway offers first-generation, college-bound students the opportunity to earn associate degrees from the Community College of Philadelphia while also earning their high school diplomas. Students take classes at the community college while in their ninth and tenth grade years. They take two college classes each school year, while taking high school classes.

In their junior and senior years, students at Parkway take full time college classes and then graduate from college before they graduate from high school. In 2017, incoming ninth graders became the first class of students to be included as part of this program; the remainder of the school functioned as a traditional high school. In 2021, the entire school began operating as a middle college.
