= Spring Garden School =

- Spring Garden School No. 2
- U.S. National Register of Historic Places
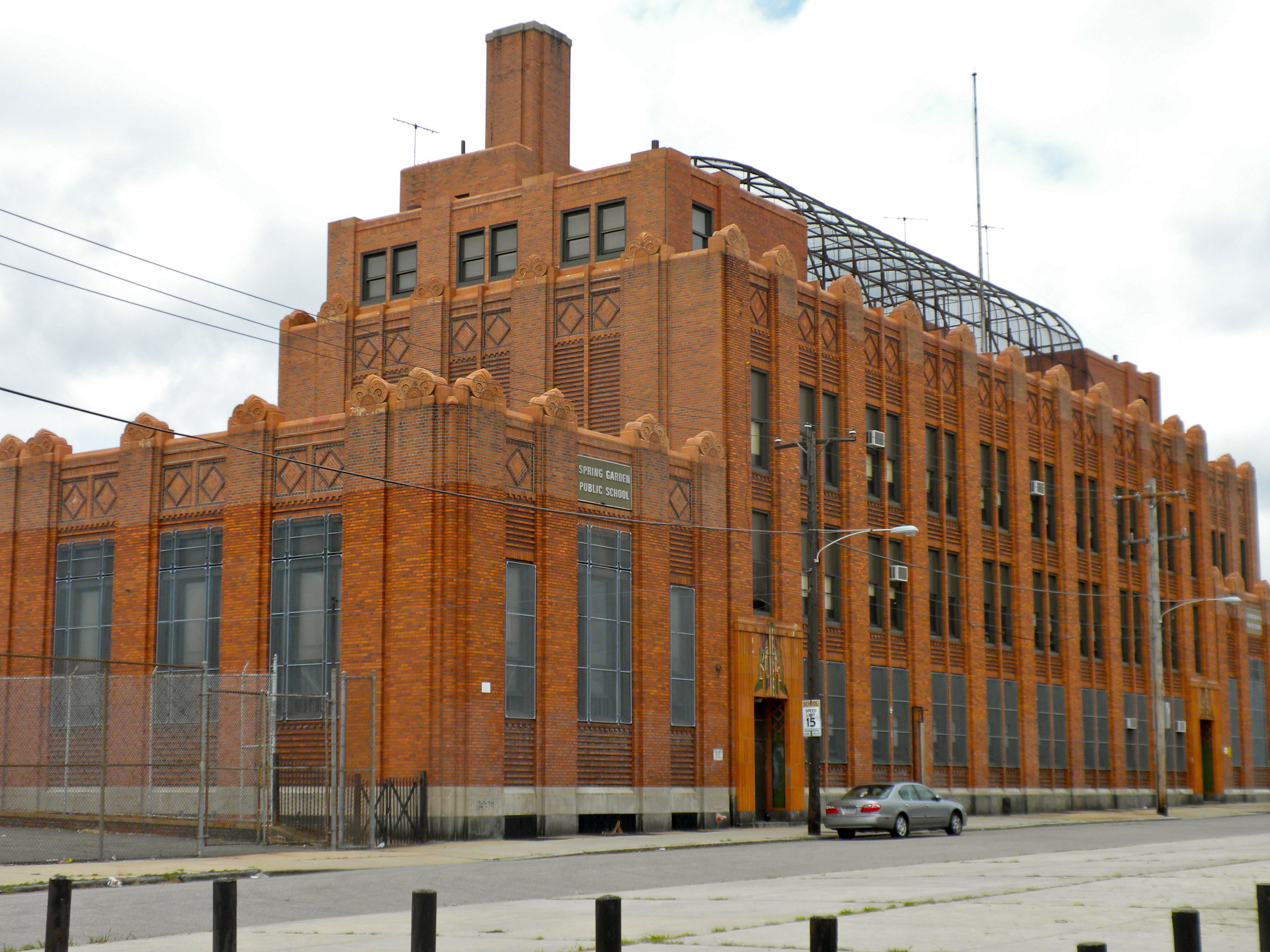
- Spring Garden School No 2, August 2010

- Location within Philadelphia Location within Pennsylvania Location within the United States
- Location: 1146 Melon St., Philadelphia, Pennsylvania
- Coordinates: 39°57′54″N 75°9′24″W
- Area: 2 acres (0.81 ha)
- Built: 1930–1931
- Architect: Irwin T. Catharine
- Architectural style: Art Deco
- MPS: Philadelphia Public Schools TR
- NRHP reference No.: 86003333
- Added to NRHP: December 4, 1986

Spring Garden School is a public K-8 school in the Poplar neighborhood of Philadelphia, Pennsylvania. It is a part of the School District of Philadelphia.

The historic school building originally housed Spring Garden School No. 2. It was designed by Irwin T. Catharine and built in 1930–1931. It is a three-story, 16 bay orange brick building in the Art Deco-style. It features corbelled brick pilasters with capitals adorned by floral motifs and a caged rooftop play area.

It was added to the National Register of Historic Places in 1986.

The Spring Garden attendance boundary includes a portion of the Center City District just north of the traditional boundary of Center City. Residents zoned to Spring Garden are zoned to Benjamin Franklin High School. As of 2016 over 70% of students who graduate from Spring Garden instead go to special admission and magnet schools such as Bodine High School for International Affairs, Carver High School for Science and Engineering, Constitution High School, Parkway High School, and Philadelphia High School for Girls.

== History ==
In 2015 a parent who participated in a lawsuit against the Commonwealth of Pennsylvania stated that the school nurse at Spring Garden only appears once per week, and that the school had been forced to end its Spanish as a second language program.

The former school building, located between Parrish and Ogden Streets on 12th Avenue in Philadelphia, has been abandoned since 1986. The current Spring Garden School is located at 1146 Melon Street. As of the 2023-2024 school year, 81% of students live in the Catchment Area for Spring Garden School.

In October 2017, efforts were made by Help USA (a nonprofit organization investing in supportive and housing services) to assist homeless Philadelphia veterals including 12 and an additional 37 housing units for low-income seniors.
