= Thaddeus Stevens School of Observation =

- U.S. National Register of Historic Places
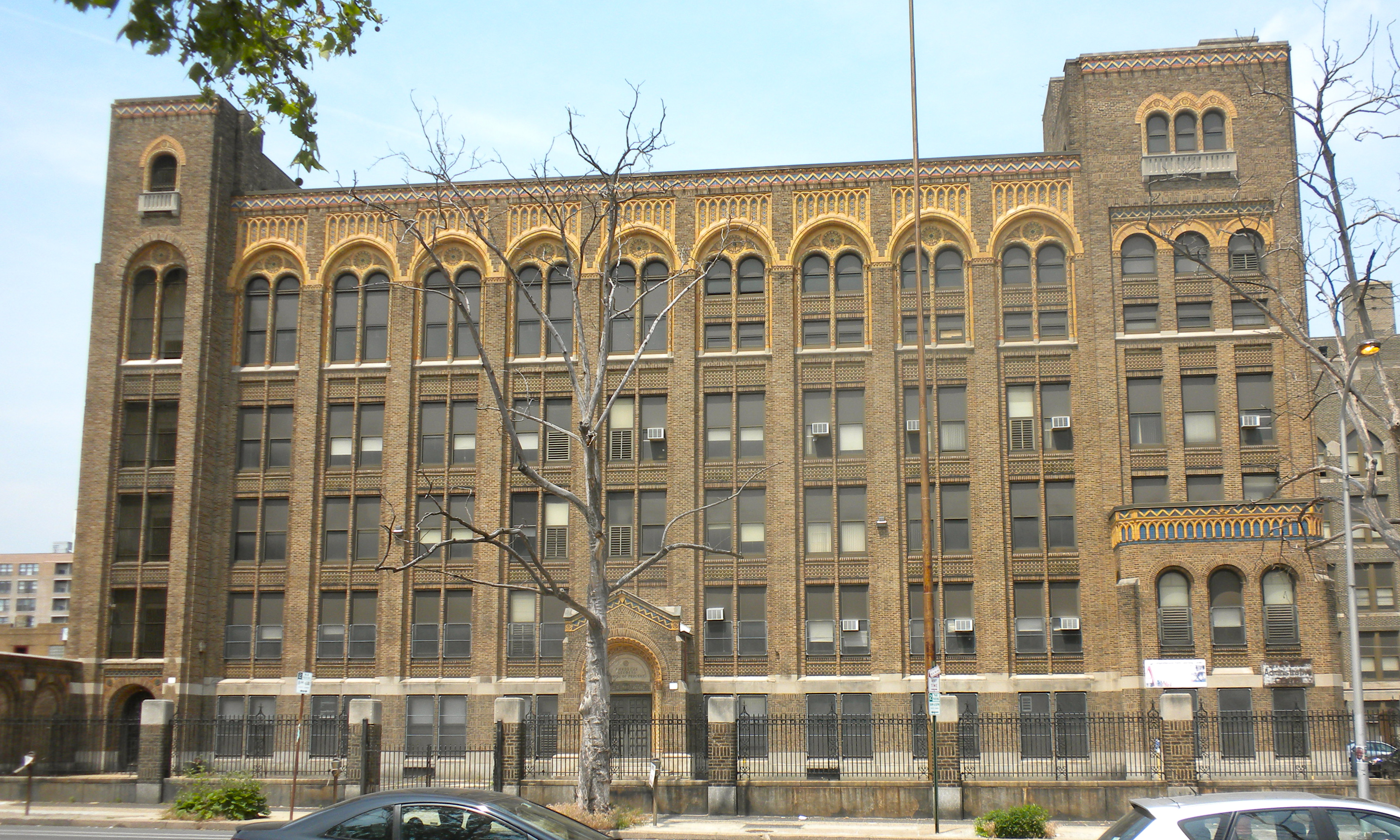
- Thaddeus Stevens School of Observation, May 2010

- Location within Philadelphia Location within Pennsylvania Location within the United States
- Location: 1301 Spring Garden St., Philadelphia, Pennsylvania
- Coordinates: 39.962°N 75.1602°W
- Area: 2 acres (0.81 ha)
- Built: 1926–1927
- Architect: Irwin T. Catharine
- Architectural style: Late Gothic Revival, Ecclesiastical Gothic
- MPS: Philadelphia Public Schools TR
- NRHP reference No.: 86003335
- Added to NRHP: December 4, 1986

The Thaddeus Stevens School of Observation is a historic American school building in the Poplar neighborhood of Philadelphia, Pennsylvania.

It was added to the National Register of Historic Places in 1988. The school has since closed and has been turned into lofts.

== History and architectural features ==
Designed by Irwin T. Catharine and built between 1926 and 1927, this historic structure is a five-story, brick building hat sits on a limestone base and grade-level basement. Created in the Late Gothic Revival style, it features a projecting entrance bay with Gothic arch opening, round arched openings, and decorative spandrel panels. It was used as an "observation school" for teacher education and training. It is named for Congressman Thaddeus Stevens (1792–1868).

In 1998, Philadelphia based mural artist Meg Saligman painted the iconic mural "Common Threads," wherein she depicted a humanity shared across time, today's youth paralleled with classical figures. All models for the mural were local high school students.
