= Mary Channing Wister School =

- U.S. National Register of Historic Places
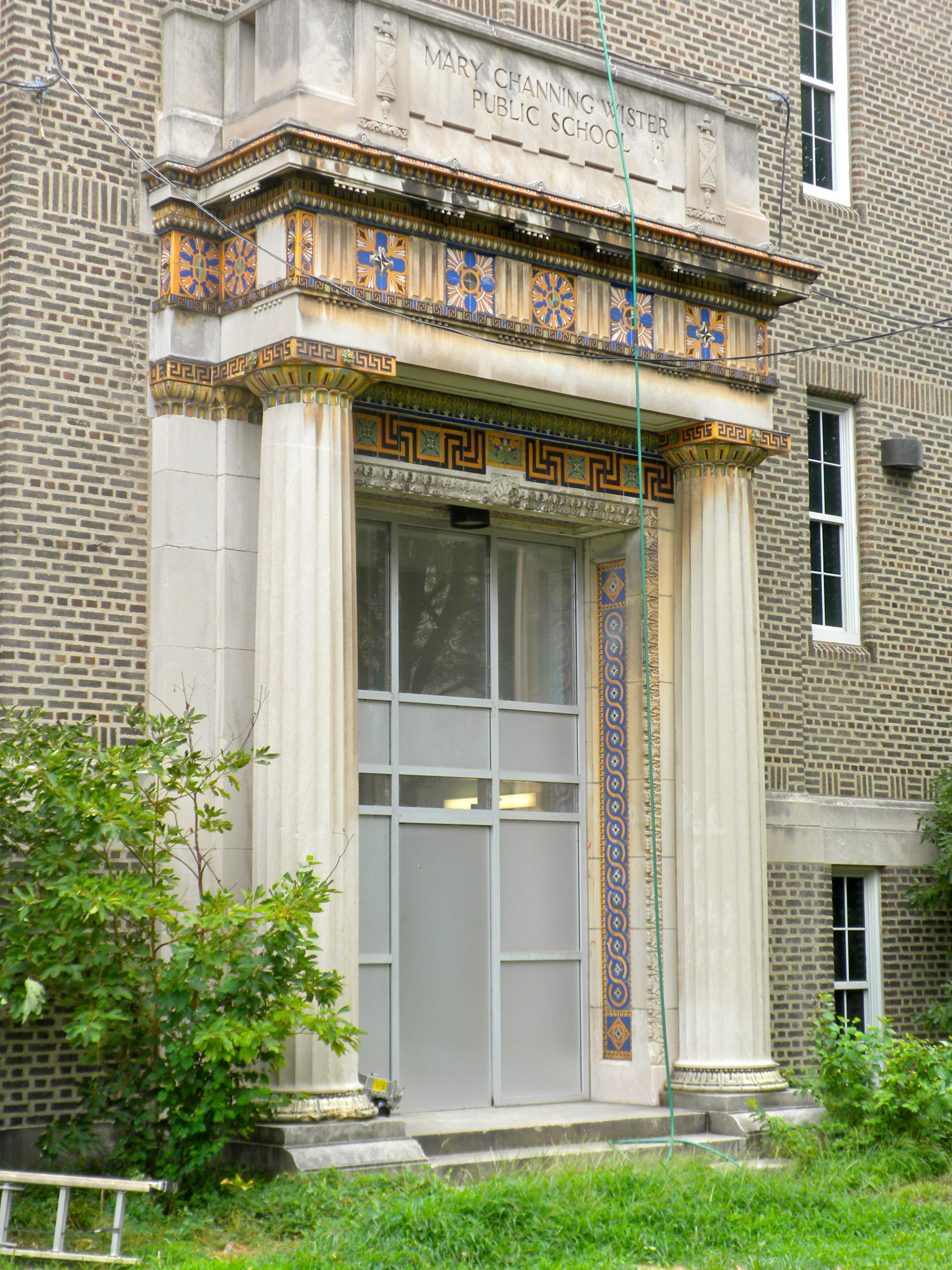
- Mary Channing Wister School entrance, August 2010

- Location within Philadelphia Location within Pennsylvania Location within the United States
- Location: 843–855 N. 8th St., Philadelphia, Pennsylvania
- Coordinates: 39°58′01″N 75°09′02″W
- Area: less than one acre
- Built: 1925–1926
- Built by: McCloskey & Co.
- Architect: Irwin T. Catharine
- Architectural style: Art Deco
- MPS: Philadelphia Public Schools TR
- NRHP reference No.: 88002333
- Added to NRHP: November 18, 1988

The Mary Channing Wister School, originally the Mary Channing Wister Public School, is a historic American school building in the Poplar neighborhood of Philadelphia, Pennsylvania.

It was added to the National Register of Historic Places in 1988.

== History and architectural features ==
Designed by Irwin T. Catharine, this historic structure was built between 1925 and 1926. It is a three-story, three-bay, brick building that sits on a raised basement. It was created in the Art Deco style. An addition was built in 1960. It features a freestanding portico with Doric order columns and decorative tile. It is named for the civic leader Mary Channing Wister, the wife of Owen Wister.

In 2001, the building was renovated to become a new forensic science laboratory for the Philadelphia Police Department. While the facade remains true to the original design with little change, the inside of the building was completely renovated and designated a Green building. The new laboratory is called the Forensic Science Center, and is operated by the Office of Forensic Science within the Philadelphia Police Department.
