= Spring Garden School No. 1 =

- U.S. National Register of Historic Places
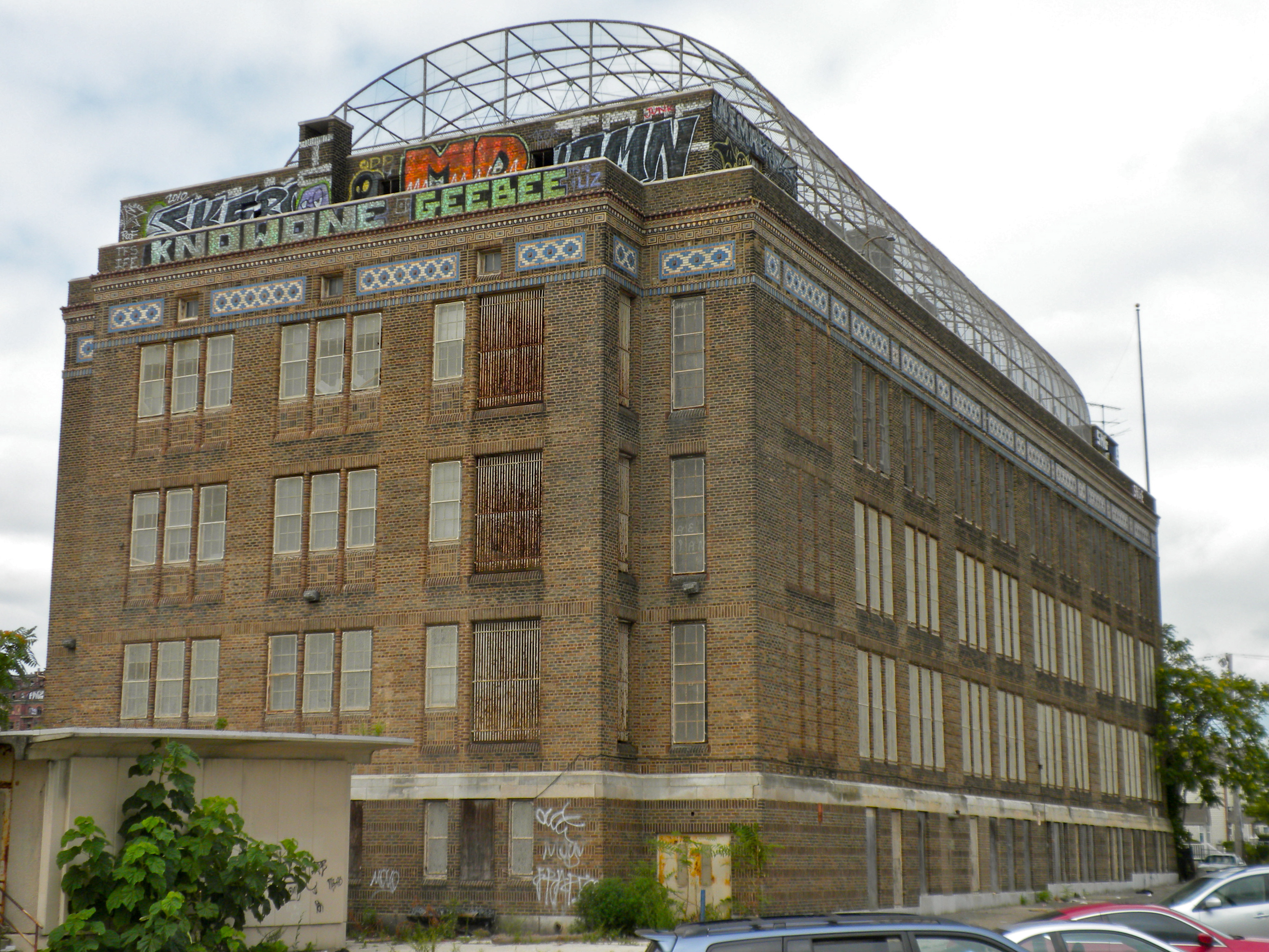
- Spring Garden School No 1, August 2010

- Location within Philadelphia Location within Pennsylvania Location within the United States
- Location: Twelfth and Ogden Sts., Philadelphia, Pennsylvania
- Coordinates: 39°58′6″N 75°9′22″W
- Area: 1 acre (0.40 ha)
- Built: 1927-1928
- Architect: Catharine, Irwin T.
- Architectural style: Moderne
- MPS: Philadelphia Public Schools TR
- NRHP reference No.: 86003332
- Added to NRHP: December 4, 1986

The Spring Garden School No. 1 is a historic American school building in the Poplar neighborhood of Philadelphia, Pennsylvania.

It was added to the National Register of Historic Places in 1986. By 2013 the building had been abandoned.

== History and architectural features ==
Designed by Irwin T. Catharine, this historic structure was built between 1927 and 1928 and is a three-story, three-bay brick building that was created in the Modernestyle. It features a limestone entrance surround, a limestone parapet, and decorative tile.

The school closed in the 1970s and the building remained vacant for decades.

=== Present day ===
As of 2016 the building had old textbooks and graffiti inside. Around that period, there was a plan to convert the buildings into apartments for disadvantaged elderly people.

Around 2017, the school building reopened as affordable housing for veterans.
