= Poplar, Philadelphia =

Poplar
- Neighborhood of Philadelphia
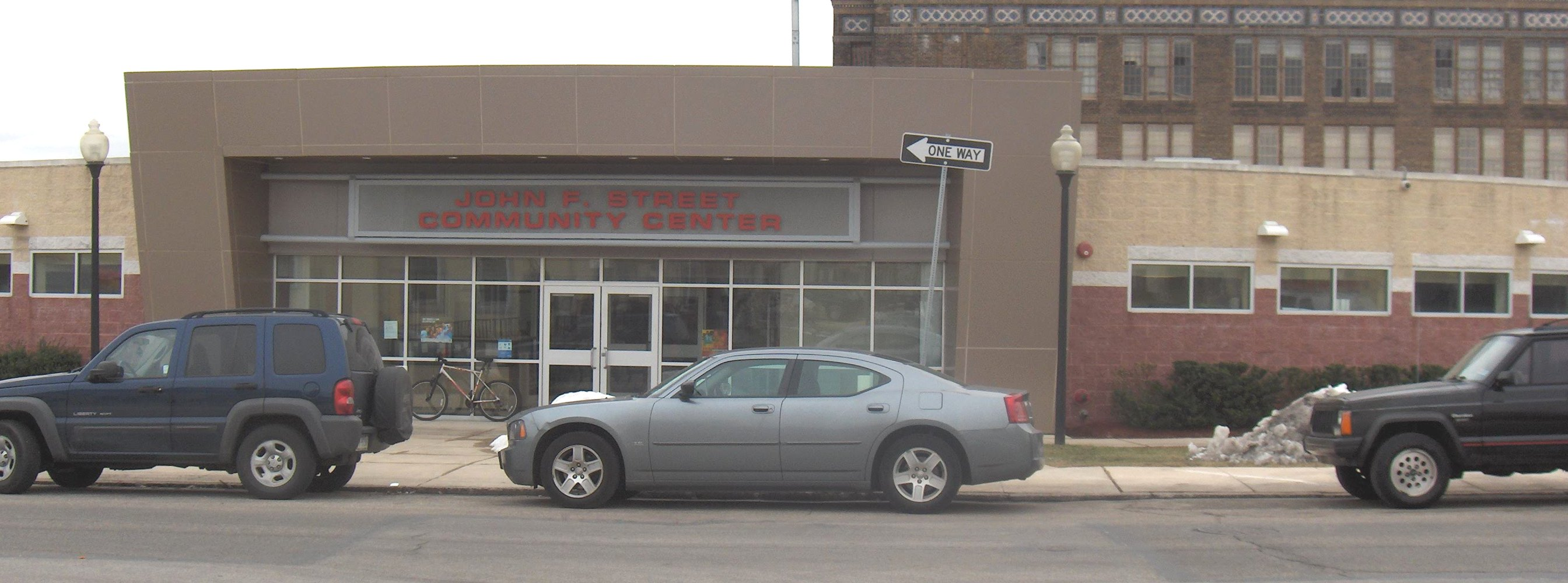
- John F. Street Community Center, 1100 Poplar Street

- Location within Philadelphia
- Coordinates: 39°57′58″N 75°09′13″W
- Country: United States
- State: Pennsylvania
- County: Philadelphia
- City: Philadelphia
- Area codes: 215, 267 and 445

Poplar is a neighborhood in Lower North Philadelphia, Pennsylvania, United States. It is located north of Callowhill, between Spring Garden/Fairmount and Northern Liberties, bounded roughly by Girard Avenue to the north, North Broad Street to the west, Spring Garden Street to the south, and 5th Street to the east. The neighborhood is predominantly residential, with commercial frontage on Broad Street and Girard Avenue and some industrial facilities to the west of the railroad tracks along Percy St. and 9th St.

== History ==
In the early 1800s, there were a number of theaters and performance halls in the district. Spring Garden Street, now a major arterial road and the southern boundary of the Poplar neighborhood, initially only ran from Sixth to Tenth Streets. The Washington Circus was raised at the eastern end of Spring Garden Street in 1828 and later converted into an amphitheater that could seat up to 1,200 people. Next to the amphitheater was a covered market in the median of the wide street. By 1850 the amphitheater had been demolished, and Spring Garden Street was extended one block to the east and west to the Schuylkill River.

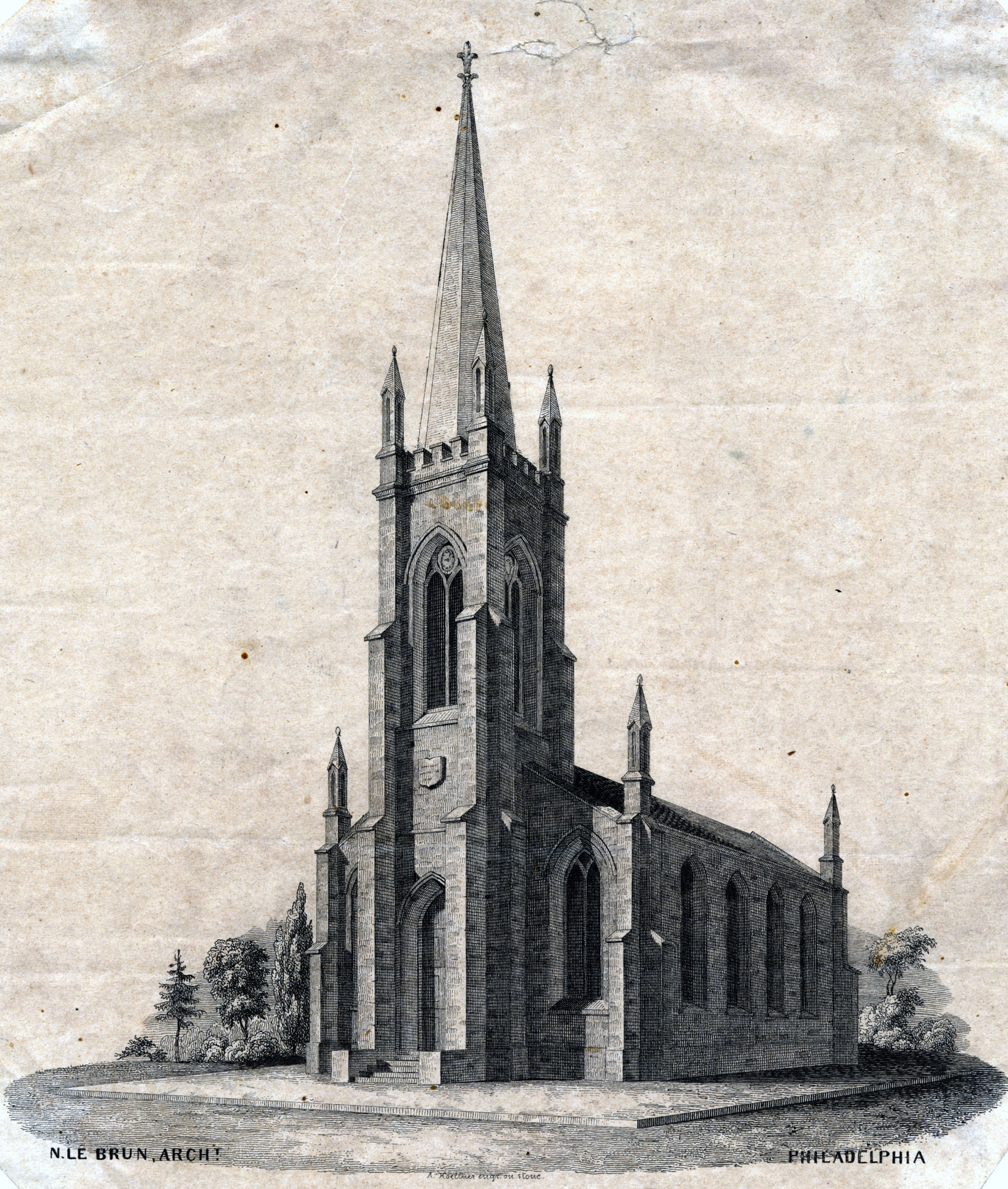
1844 lithograph of LeBrun's design for the Church of the Nativity

The Church of the Nativity, designed by Napoleon LeBrun, was built on 11th and Mount Vernon in 1846. In 1847, Congregation Rodeph Shalom built its first synagogue at Broad and Mount Vernon. The building was designed by Frank Furness in the Moorish Revival style.

Some of the earliest inhabitants of what is today known as the Poplar neighborhood were affluent Quakers, who built Georgian style townhouses in the vicinity of Spring Garden Street using money they had made in Philadelphia's mid-century industrial boom. Some of these large townhomes are still standing on the block between North 8th and North Franklin Streets.

Quaker philanthropy has played a role in the development of the neighborhood, with the Friends Mission Number One being established in 1879 "to provide a moral and spiritual uplift to poor immigrants" in the broader Spring Garden district. The organization changed its name to the Friends Neighborhood Guild in 1899.

In the later 1800s a large power generating substation was built by the Union Traction Company, a streetcar operator. In 1897 a large fire damaged the building and killed two employees. The German Society of Pennsylvania constructed its headquarters at 611 Spring Garden Street in 1888. The Strawbridge & Clothier warehouse was built on 9th and Poplar Streets in 1918.

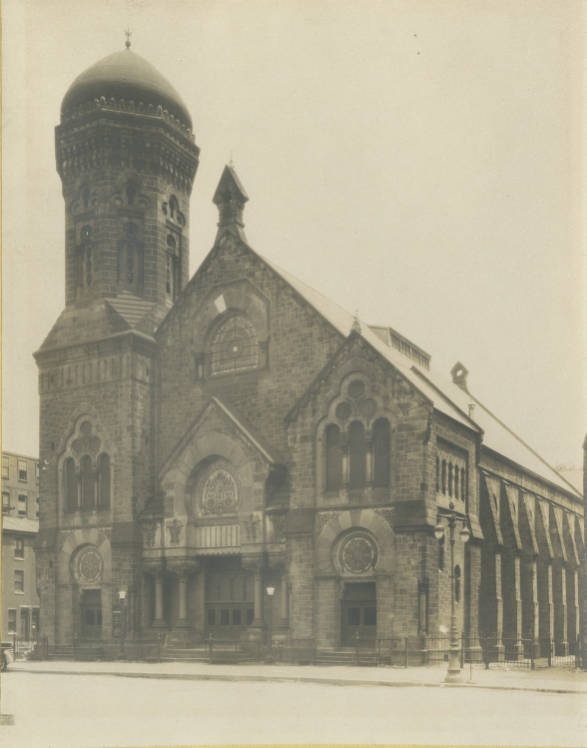

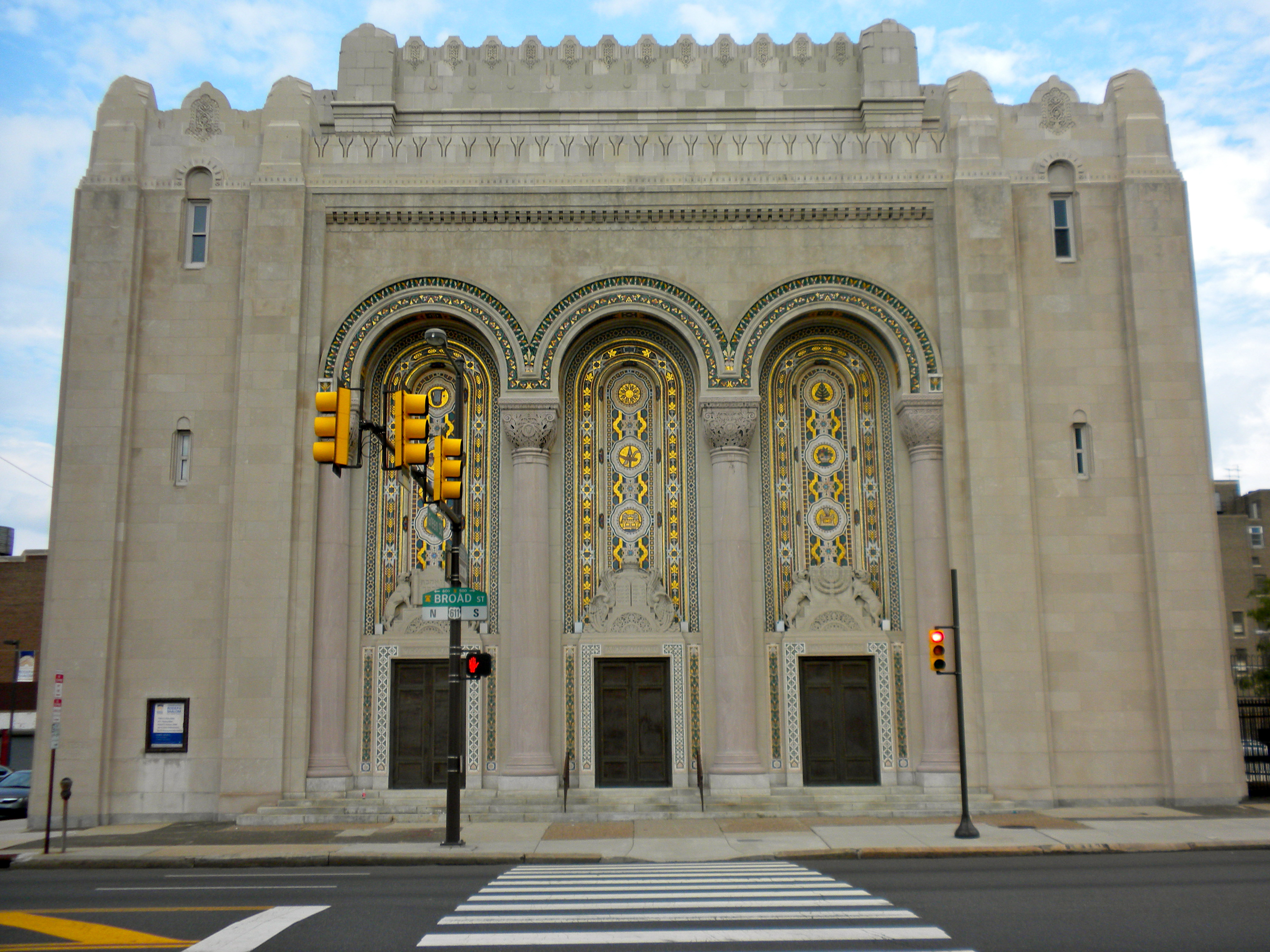
The old and new Rodeph Shalom synagogues

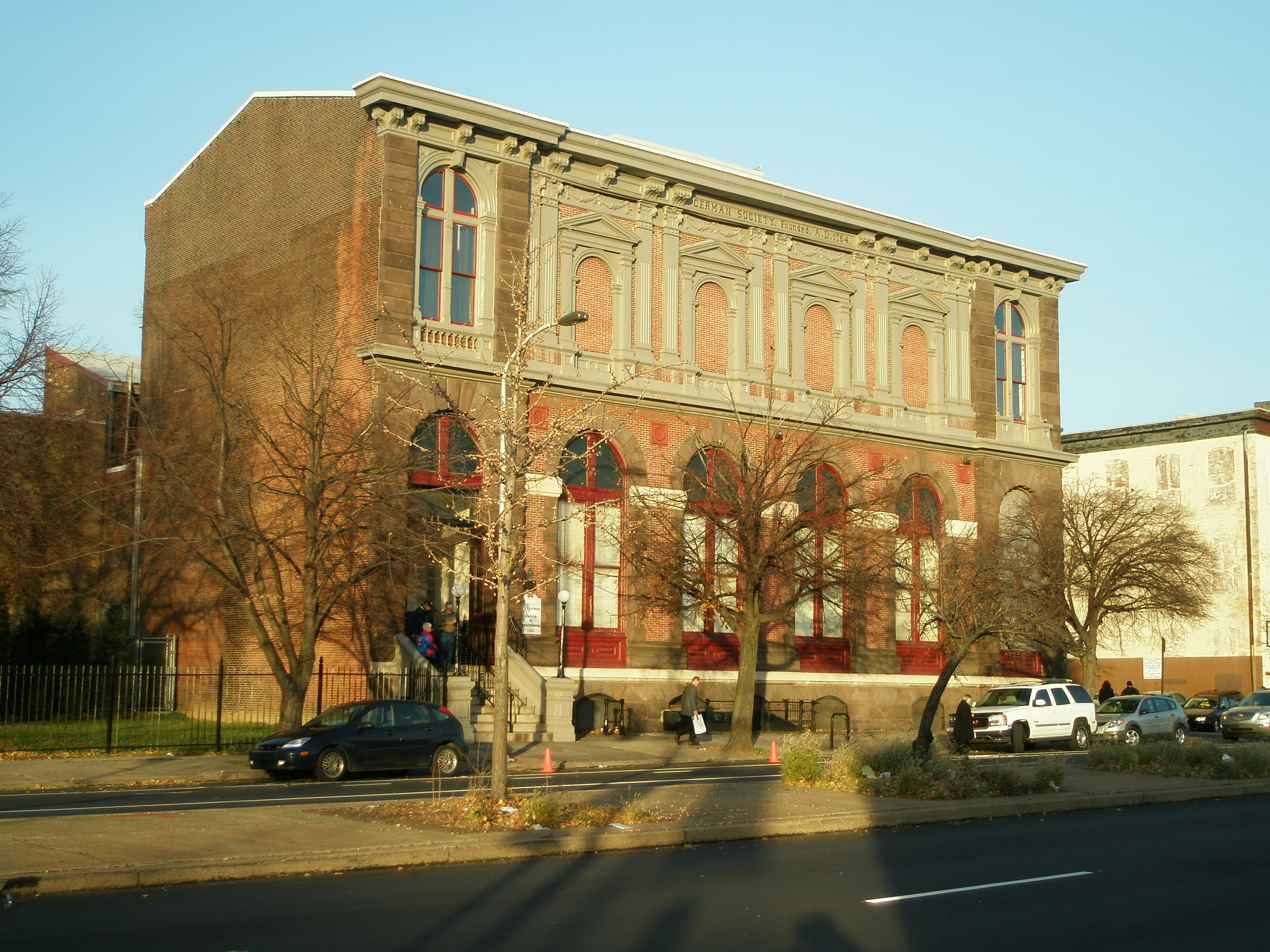
The German Society headquarters

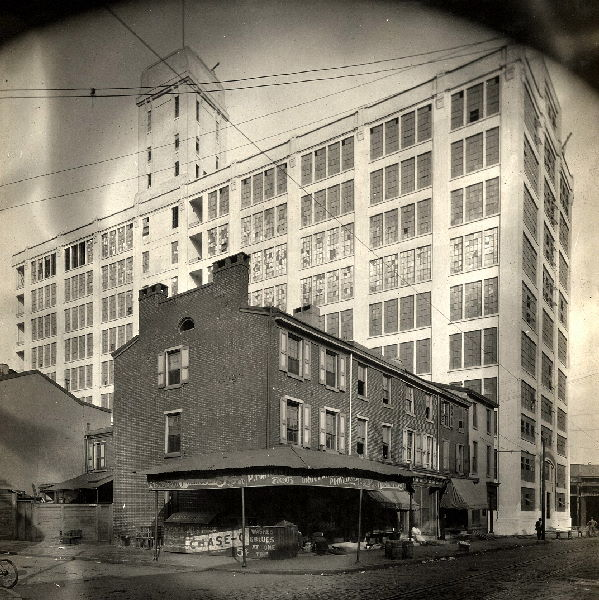

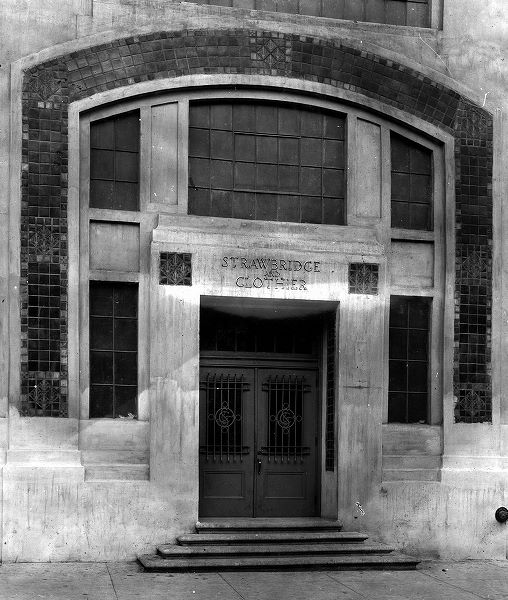
The Strawbridge & Clothier warehouse in 1918

The expansion of Spring Garden Street in the early 20th century caused many of the area's original wealthy inhabitants to move to more remote neighborhoods as Jewish, Irish and later Puerto Rican immigrants moved in. Old townhomes, once extravagant, became overcrowded tenements. An open air market formed on Marshall Street and became a hub for Jewish businesses and community life.

In 1927, Congregation Rodeph Shalom built its second and current synagogue at Broad and Mount Vernon Street.

=== Urban Renewal ===
The Great Depression left many homes and buildings in disrepair, leading the city to raze them in the late 1930s. The Philadelphia Transportation Company, formed from the consolidation of several failing streetcar and rail firms, went bankrupt in 1939 and its possessions, including the power substation at 13th and Mount Vernon, were inherited by SEPTA. The eastern portion of the building was converted to a mechanic shop in the 1950s, while the western section remains in use by SEPTA to power the Broad–Ridge Spur.

Beginning in the 1940s, the Redevelopment Authority of Philadelphia designated the area between Spring Garden, Poplar, 5th and 8th Streets as the East Poplar Urban Renewal Area. The city built a number of housing projects in the area including Penn Towne, designed by the architect Louis Khan and completed in 1953, and the Richard Allen Homes, a massive public housing project that replaced blighted areas, as well as providing housing for new workers attracted to the city for wartime production. The Richard Allen Homes were completed in 1941, and remained one of Poplar's defining physical characteristics for the next several decades.

The Friends Neighborhood Guild became involved in urban renewal efforts in the Poplar area, establishing the Friends Housing Cooperative (FHC) residential housing complex between Fairmount Avenue, Franklin Street, Brown Street and North 8th Street which was rehabilitated for low-income families. FHC consists of semi-detached homes built circa 1850 and reconfigured into a market-rate, gated apartment community in the early 1950s.

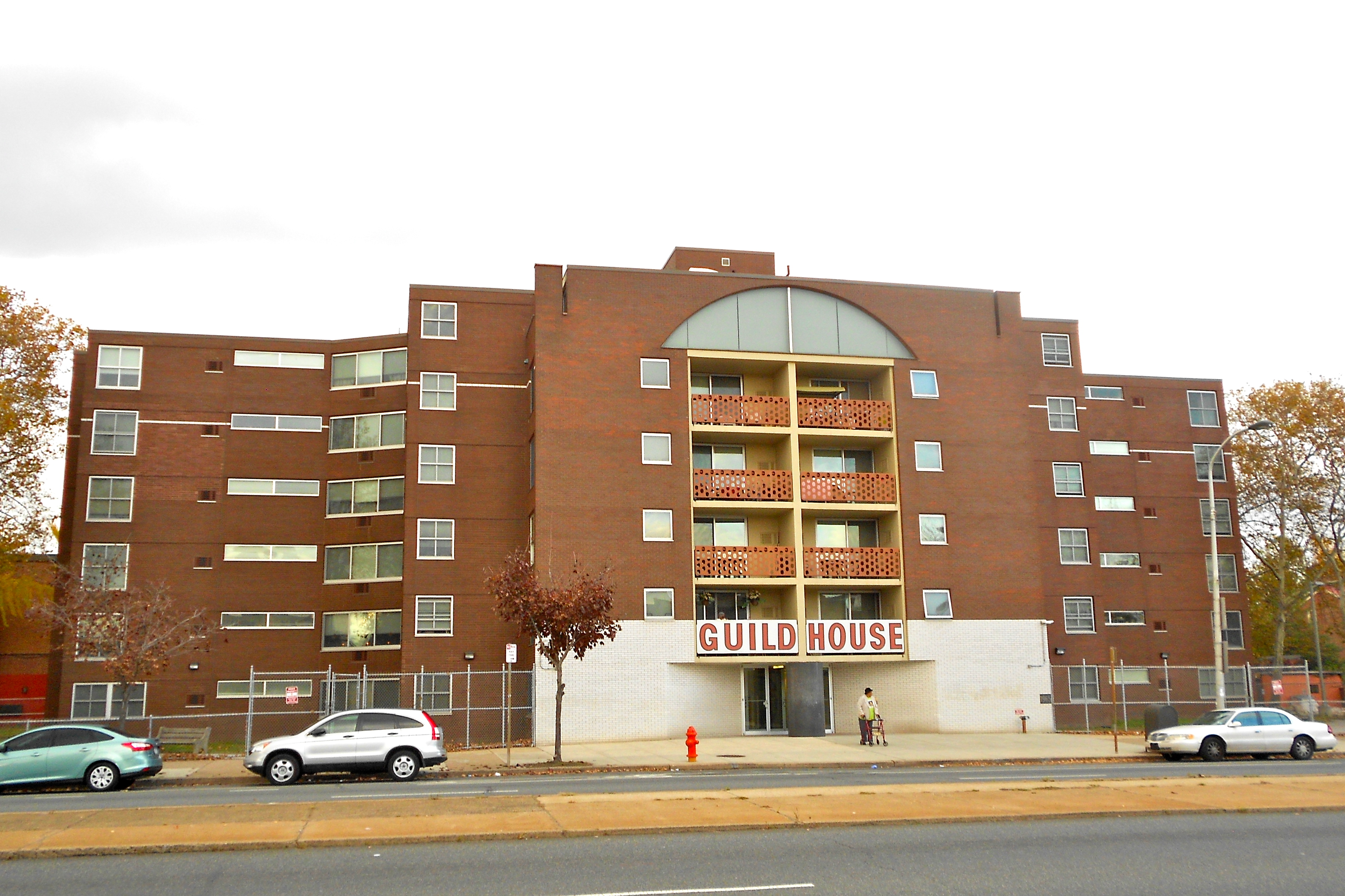
The Guild House on Spring Garden Street

Other postwar projects include the Penn Towne Homes, the first redevelopment project in the nation built under the Housing Act of 1949, the Spring Garden Homes, completed in 1955, and the Guild House, designed by Robert Venturi and Denise Scott Brown and completed in 1964.

During Richardson Dilworth's mayoral term, city officials aggressively enforced the city's housing codes to demolish deteriorated buildings, hoping this would prevent the further exacerbation of poor living conditions in the neighborhood. In 1959, the city enacted a land acquisition program by which the Department of Licenses & Inspections could acquire vacant or deteriorated properties and turn them over to community groups through the sheriff sale. The Melon Neighborhood Commons was one such initiative built at 12th and Fairmount Streets with the help of the West Poplar Civic League, the Friends Neighborhood Guild and the University of Pennsylvania architect Karl Linn.

During a 10-week work period in the summer of 1961, local high school and college students built a public park out of salvaged materials from nearby dilapidated homes. The park included an amphitheater made from salvaged marble steps and a sand pit for young children. In 1962 and 1963, outdoor movie showings were held in the park and games and activities for children were hosted by the Friends Neighborhood Guild. However, community dynamics began to shift after the Columbia Avenue Riot, with the city government becoming less cooperative with grassroots organizations. The growing black power movement also became more antagonistic towards Quaker neighborhood organizations. Lack of supervision in the park led to the theft and vandalism of the park's material elements.

By the early 1960s, the Richard Allen Homes were overcrowded and run down. Budget cuts by the city effected an egregious degree of deterioration in the homes, and poorly planned open spaces encouraged crime, generating notoriety for the neighborhood as a center for crime and drug trafficking. The 12th & Oxford gang and the 12th & Poplar gang feuded over territory in the neighborhood, as was depicted in the 1967 film The Jungle.

The Allen Homes complemented Cambridge Plaza, a modernist public housing project comprising two 248-unit, high-rise towers and 124 low-rise townhouses. Cambridge Plaza was constructed in 1957 and demolished in 2001, when the Philadelphia Housing Authority began to erect suburban-style duplexes and single-family homes.

The Fairmount Manor project encountered significant public resistance from neighborhood groups. Initially planned as owner-occupied single family homes, plans for the Manor were altered to call for the construction of garden style apartments. East Poplar residents led by Maurice Shannon argued in court that the Fairmount Manor apartments would harm the living conditions and character of the neighborhood. They were unsuccessful in stopping the development of the apartments, which were rushed and of poor quality, but they were able to extract a concession from HUD as a result of the agency's negligence toward the neighborhood: the construction of the Liberty Place townhomes.

In the 1990s, the Melon Neighborhood Commons were demolished to build city-run senior housing on the site. The Richard Allen Homes were cleared out and replaced with suburban-style single-family homes and duplexes. Some of the neighborhood's original row houses remain, mostly south of Fairmount Avenue and west of the regional rail tracks.

In the 2010s, demand for housing in the neighborhood increased, leading to a number of new developments as well as demolitions and reuses of old buildings. In 2013, the Church of the Nativity at 11th and Mount Vernon was demolished and by 2015, it had been replaced with a row of townhomes and a gated parking lot called Spring Arts Square. In 2015, the eastern portion of the former Philadelphia Transit Company substation was adapted into a 40-unit apartment building. A major development was proposed and later built on a largely vacant parcel of land between Broad Street, Ridge Avenue, 13th Street and Fairmount Avenue. The building now contains an Aldi, Chesterbrook Academy and a number of apartments for rent. The Strawbridge and Clothier warehouse was converted into a residential apartment building, but in 2024 a kitchen fire displaced between 200 and 300 of its residents. A number of residential and commercial developments have been recently completed or are underway along Broad Street, Ridge Avenue, Spring Garden Street and in other infill lots in the neighborhood.

== Transportation ==
The 23 bus runs north through the neighborhood on 11th Street and south on 12th Street. The 61 bus runs north and south on Ridge Avenue. The 47 bus runs north on Seventh Street and south on Eighth Street. Several regional rail routes run through Poplar but do not stop in the neighborhood.

== Landmarks ==
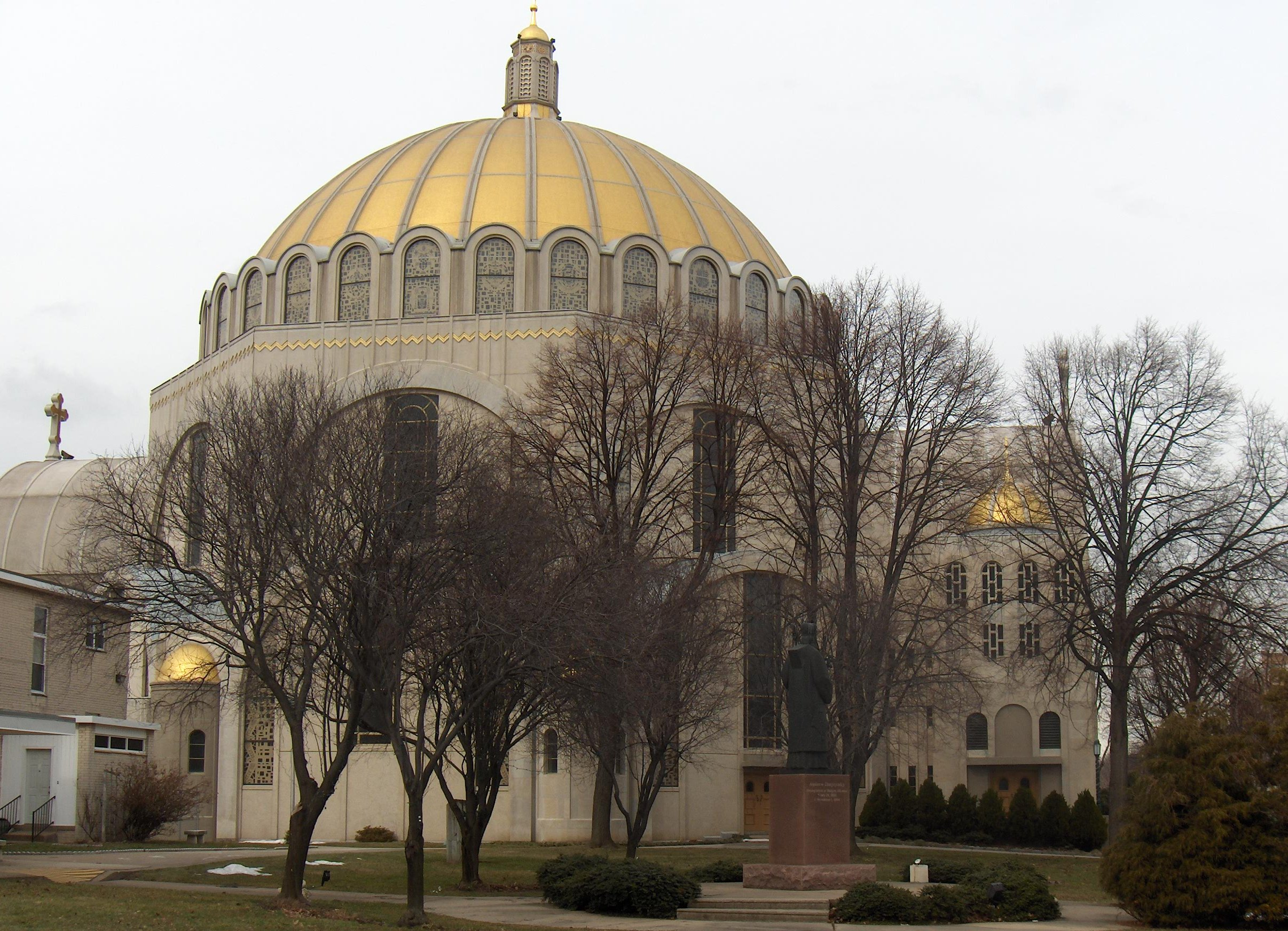
Ukrainian Catholic Cathedral of the Immaculate Conception

While most of Poplar's original housing has been demolished, a handful of defining structures identify the neighborhood and can be seen from various points both in the neighborhood and around the city. The ornate, Victorian Divine Lorraine Hotel fronts on North Broad Street at its intersection with Fairmount Avenue; the massive, former Strawbridge & Clothier warehouse is located at 9th and Poplar Streets adjacent to the SEPTA elevated line (with the expanded building occupying almost the entire space between Poplar and Girard), and two 1920s-1930s public school buildings (Spring Garden School No. 1 and Spring Garden School, the latter formerly Spring Garden School No. 2) constructed in a Moderne/Art Deco style, designed by noted Philadelphia school architect Irwin Catharine, are located on 12th St. With the exception of the southernmost of the two schools, which remains in use, the rest of the older landmarks remain vacant. The Divine Lorraine Hotel and the two schools are listed on the National Register of Historic Places along with the Thaddeus Stevens School of Observation, Rodeph Shalom Synagogue, and Mary Channing Wister School.

The Ukrainian Catholic Cathedral of the Immaculate Conception is at 830 North Franklin Street. It was built in 1966 and designed by Julian K. Jastremsky.

== Education ==
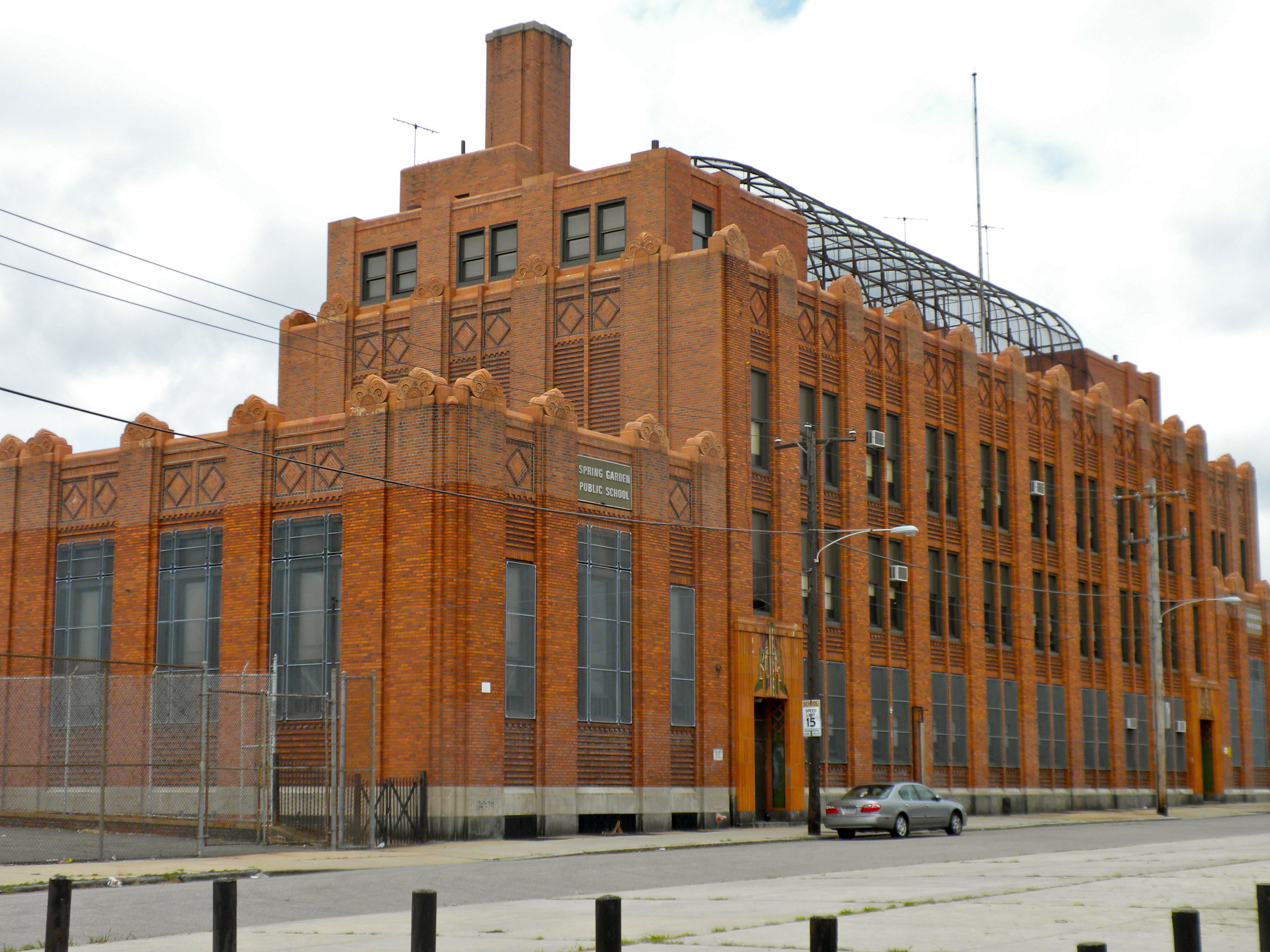
Spring Garden School in Poplar

Residents are zoned to the School District of Philadelphia. Zoned schools include:

- K-8 schools:
  - Harrison School
  - Spring Garden School
- Benjamin Franklin High School
