= List of charter schools in Delaware =

This is a list of all present and past charter schools in Delaware.

== Present ==
- Academia Charter School (Academia Antonia Alonso)
- Academy of Dover Charter School
- Bryan Allen Stevenson School of Excellence
- Campus Community School
- Charter School of New Castle
- Charter School of Wilmington
- Delaware Military Academy
- Early College High School - Delaware State University
- EastSide Charter School
- First State Military Academy
- First State Montessori Academy
- Freire Charter School Wilmington
- Gateway Charter School (Gateway Lab)
- Great Oaks Charter School
- Kuumba Academy Charter School
- Las Américas ASPIRA Academy
- MOT Charter School
- Newark Charter School
- Odyssey Charter School
- Positive Outcomes Charter School
- Providence Creek Academy
- The Sussex Academy of Arts & Sciences
- Sussex Montessori School
- Thomas Edison Charter School

== Past ==
- Delaware Academy of Public Safety and Security
- Delaware College Preparatory Academy
- Georgetown Charter School
- Maurice J. Moyer Academic Institute
- Marion T. Academy Charter School
- Pencader Charter High School
- Prestige Academy
- Reach Academy for Girls
