= John Dickinson School =

Location
- 1801 Milltown Road; Wilmington postal address, Delaware 19808; United States; 39°43′42″N 75°40′24″W

Information
- Type: Public
- Motto: Esse quam videri (To be, rather than to seem)
- Established: 1960 (66 years ago)
- School district: Red Clay Consolidated School District
- CEEB code: 080178
- Principal: Devearl Royster
- Teaching staff: 62.00 (FTE)
- Grades: 6–12
- Enrollment: 1,032 (2023-2024)
- Colors: Columbia blue and white
- Athletics conference: Blue Hen Conference - Flight B
- Mascot: Ram
- Newspaper: Patriot
- Yearbook: Penman
- Website: dickinson.redclayschools.com

The John Dickinson School, previously known as John Dickinson High School, is a public middle and high school in the Pike Creek area of New Castle County, Delaware, with a Wilmington post office address. It is one of five high schools in the Red Clay Consolidated School District and serves parts of Newport, Stanton, Hockessin, Wilmington, North Star, Pike Creek, Pike Creek Valley, Baynard Boulevard, and Brandywine Village.

== History ==
The school, opened 1960, is located on a 67-acre (270,000 m^{2}) campus and takes its name from John Dickinson, one of the Founding Fathers of the United States. It was originally in the Henry C. Conrad School District and was moved first to the New Castle County Consolidated School District in 1978, then to the Red Clay Consolidated School District in 1981. In January 1995, an arson fire destroyed substantial parts of the building, so much so that did not reopen fully until September; students had to attend nearby McKean High School in staggered schedules until portions of Dickinson were opened again in March.

In 2013, Dickinson students broke the Guinness World Record for highest Lego tower ever built at 112 feet. Their record was beat the following year by a 114-foot tower in Budapest.

== Academics ==
Dickinson offers IB, AP, honors, college-preparatory, and dual-enrollment classes. As part of Delaware's initiative to inject more intensive career readiness into its high schools, Dickinson offers the following Pathways: automotive technology, AVID, computer science, digital communication arts, drafting and design, engineering of structures, engineering of robotics, graphic design, Jobs for Delaware Graduates, processes of design and engineering, Business and Entrepreneurship, and renovation and construction. Students have the opportunity to earn certifications and licenses such as the Delaware Certificate of Multiliteracy, EPA Certificate, IB Diploma, National Lead Safety for Renovation and Painting Certificate, and/or National OSHA Certificate.

For the 2018–2019 academic year, the graduation rate was 78%.

== Activities ==
=== Athletics ===
Dickinson is part of the Delaware Interscholastic Athletic Association and competes in Blue Hen Conference, Flight "B".

=== Performing arts ===
Dickinson has not had a marching or pep band since 2017.

==== Theatre organ ====
Dickinson's auditorium is home to a Kimball pipe organ said to be the fourth largest theatre organ in the world. The organ was moved from the Boyd Theater in Philadelphia in 1969 and has more than 5,000 pipes, purportedly more than the organ at the Radio City Music Hall in New York City.

In addition to hosting concerts by virtuoso guest organists and instrumental ensembles, Dickinson's organ was featured on an album by organist Jelani Eddington in 2014.

== Notable alumni ==
- Gary Smith (b. 1953), sportswriter, previously forSports Illustrated from 1983 to 2013
- Brian J. Aungst, Sr. (b. 1954) (Class of 1972), broadcaster, Clearwater Florida Mayor
- Susan Stroman (b. 1954) (Class of 1972), theatre director, Tony Award Winning choreographer, film director and performer.
- Michael Mulrooney (b. 1955), former member of the Delaware House of Representatives
- Stephen Biddle (b. 1959), author, historian, policy analyst and columnist
- Wesley Watson (1962-2021), former heavyweight boxer
- Chuck Treece (b. 1964), session musician and professional skateboarder
- Mark Eaton (b. 1977) former NHL defenseman; 2009 Stanley Cup champion and the first and still only player to come from Delaware
- John Wockenfuss (b. 1949), former MLB player
