= List of Delaware high school athletic conferences =

This is a list of high school athletic conferences in the state of Delaware.

There are two public school conferences:

- The Blue Hen Conference includes schools in New Castle County.
- The Henlopen Conference includes schools in Kent County and Sussex County.

There are three private school conferences:

- The Catholic Conference comprises girls' programs at Catholic schools.
- The Delaware Independent School Conference comprises six schools including one school in Pennsylvania.
- The Diamond State Athletic Conference contains both private schools and certain charter schools (other charter schools compete in the public school conferences).

There are also Non-Conference teams, which are not aligned with any of the available conferences
