= Brandywine Village Historic District =

Historic district in Delaware, United States

- U.S. National Register of Historic Places
- U.S. Historic district
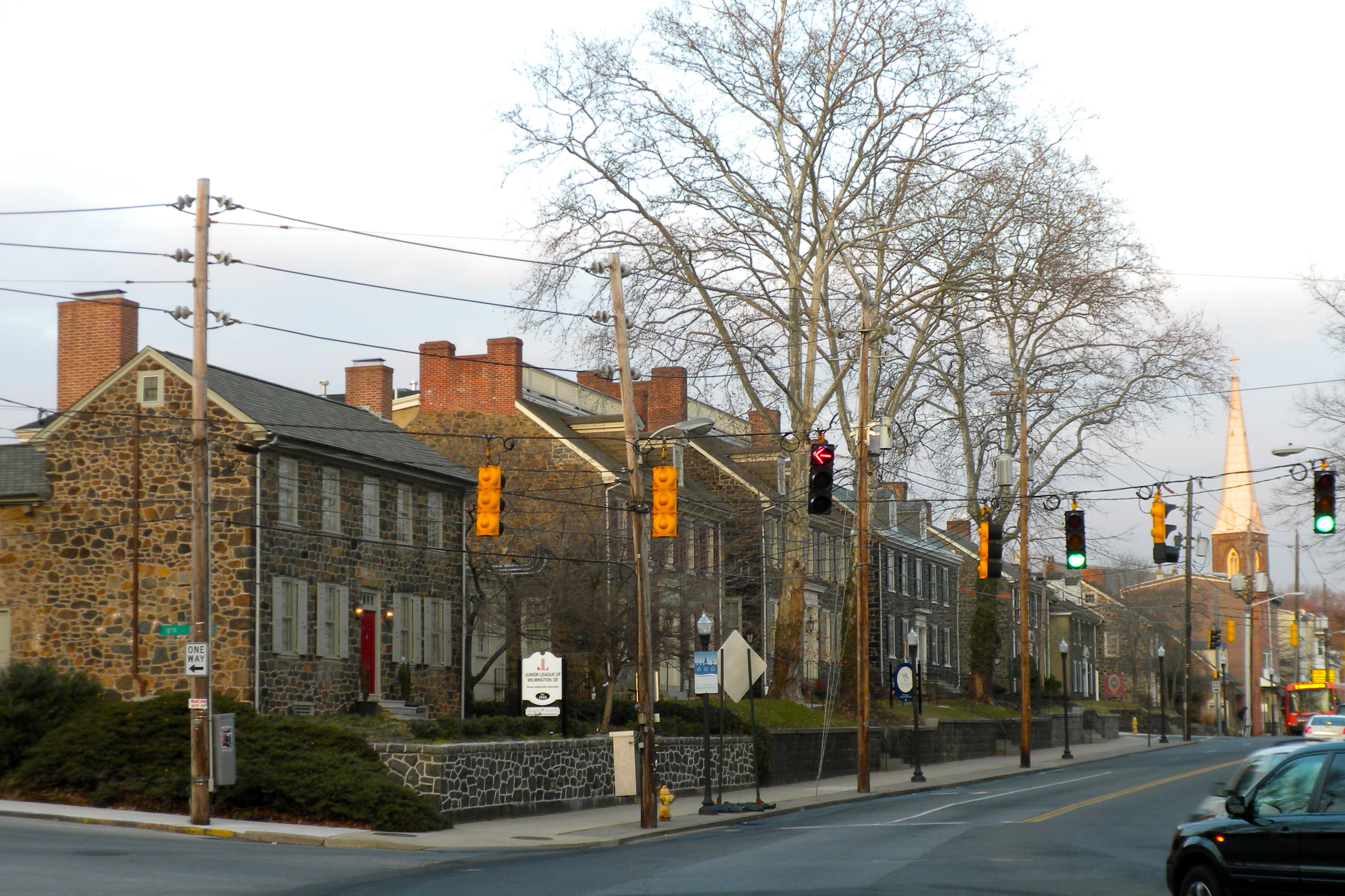
- North side of Market Street, Brandywine Village Historic District, January 2010

- Location within Delaware Location within the United States
- Location: Roughly bounded by Brandywine Creek, Tatnall, 22nd, Gordon Sts., Vandever Ave., Mabel St., and 14th St. bridge, Wilmington, Delaware
- Coordinates: 39°45′04″N 75°32′29″W
- Area: 33 acres (13 ha)
- Built: 1788
- Architect: Notman, John
- Architectural style: Gothic Revival
- NRHP reference No.: 71000229, 76002296 (Boundary Increase)
- Added to NRHP: February 24, 1971, October 21, 1976 (Boundary Increase)

Brandywine Village Historic District is a national historic district located along Brandywine Creek at Wilmington, New Castle County, Delaware. It encompasses 12 contributing buildings, 7 contributing sites, and 2 contributing structures. Brandywine Village developed in the late-18th century as a group of flour mills, the homes of prosperous millers, mill workers, shop keepers and artisans. Located in the district are a set of mill owner built homes of granite. Notable buildings include the Gothic Revival style St. John's Episcopal Church (1857-1858) designed by noted Philadelphia architect John Notman, Brandywine Methodist Episcopal Church (1857), and Brandywine Academy (1798). In 1788, Brandywine Village was the site of the first mechanized mill designed by Oliver Evans.

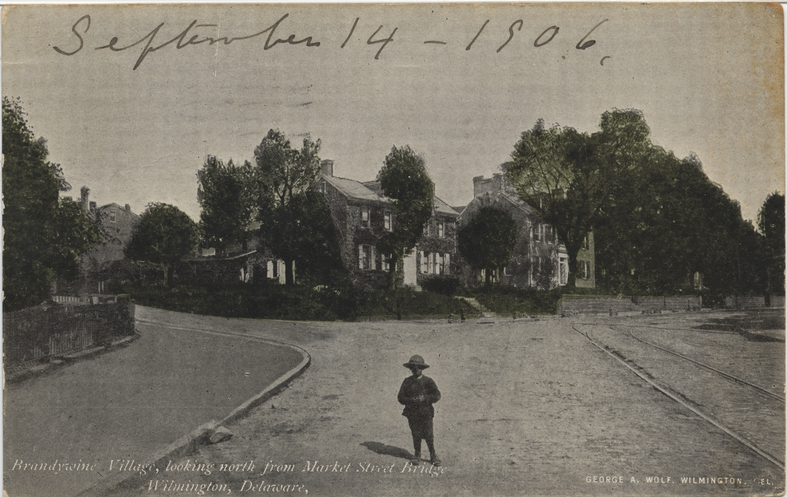
1906 postcard of neighborhood

It was added to the National Register of Historic Places in 1971 and expanded in 1976.

== Education ==
Residents are zoned to the Red Clay Consolidated School District. It is zoned to Evan G. Shortlidge Academy (Kindergarten-Grade 2), Emalea P. Warner Elementary School (grades 2–5), Skyline Middle School (6-8), and John Dickinson School (9-12).
