= A. I. duPont =

A. I. duPont may refer to:

- Alfred I. duPont (1864 – 1935), American industrialist, financier and philanthropist
- Alexis I. duPont High School, public high school located in Greenville, Delaware, USA, a suburb of Wilmington
- Alfred I. duPont Hospital for Children
