= Cool Spring Park Historic District =

Historic district in Delaware, United States

- U.S. National Register of Historic Places
- U.S. Historic district
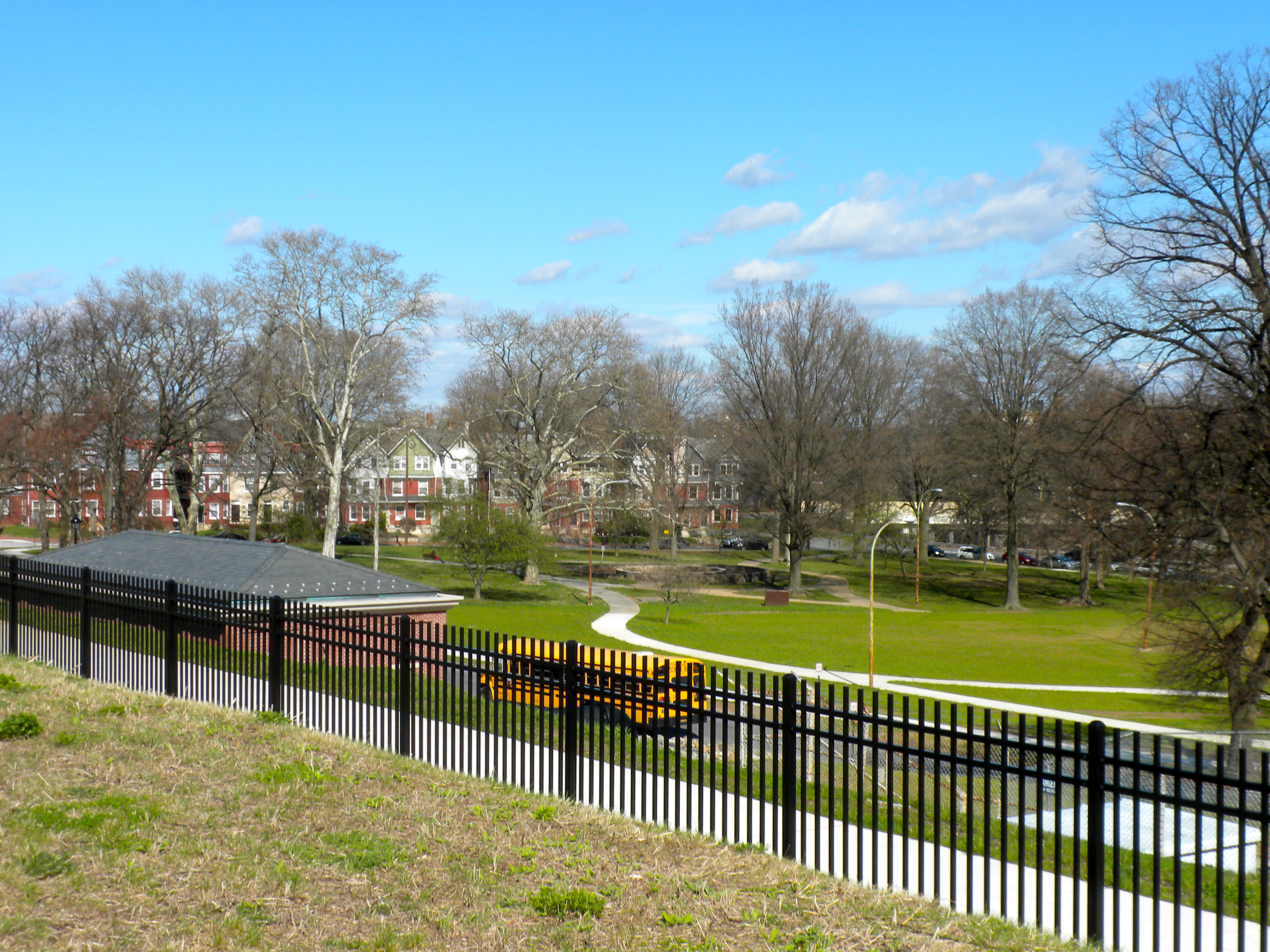
- Cool Spring Park, March 2010

- Location within Delaware Location within the United States
- Location: Bounded by Park Pl., Jackson, Van Buren, and 10th Sts., Wilmington, Delaware
- Coordinates: 39°45′00″N 75°33′34″W
- Area: 341.4 acres (138.2 ha)
- Built: 1880
- Architect: Lenderman, I. M.
- Architectural style: Gothic, Queen Anne
- NRHP reference No.: 83003513, 07000792(Boundary Increase)
- Added to NRHP: December 27, 1983, August 7, 2007 (Boundary Increase)

Cool Spring Park Historic District is a national historic district located at Wilmington, New Castle County, Delaware. It encompasses 316 contributing buildings, 3 contributing structures, and 3 contributing objects in located in and around Cool Spring Park in Wilmington. It developed in the late-19th century as a middle class residential area. They are primarily semi-detached dwellings in a variety of popular styles including Gothic Revival and Queen Anne. Also located in the district is the Cool Spring Pumping Station associated with the Cool Spring Reservoir, Cool Spring Elementary School, and Knights of Pythias Hall.

It was added to the National Register of Historic Places in 1983.

== Education ==
The housing on the 1000 block of Park Place is zoned to the Red Clay Consolidated School District. Zoned schools include William C. Lewis Dual Language Elementary School (K-5), Skyline Middle School (6-8), and Alexis I. du Pont High School.
