= Baynard Boulevard Historic District =

Historic district in Delaware, United States

- U.S. National Register of Historic Places
- U.S. Historic district
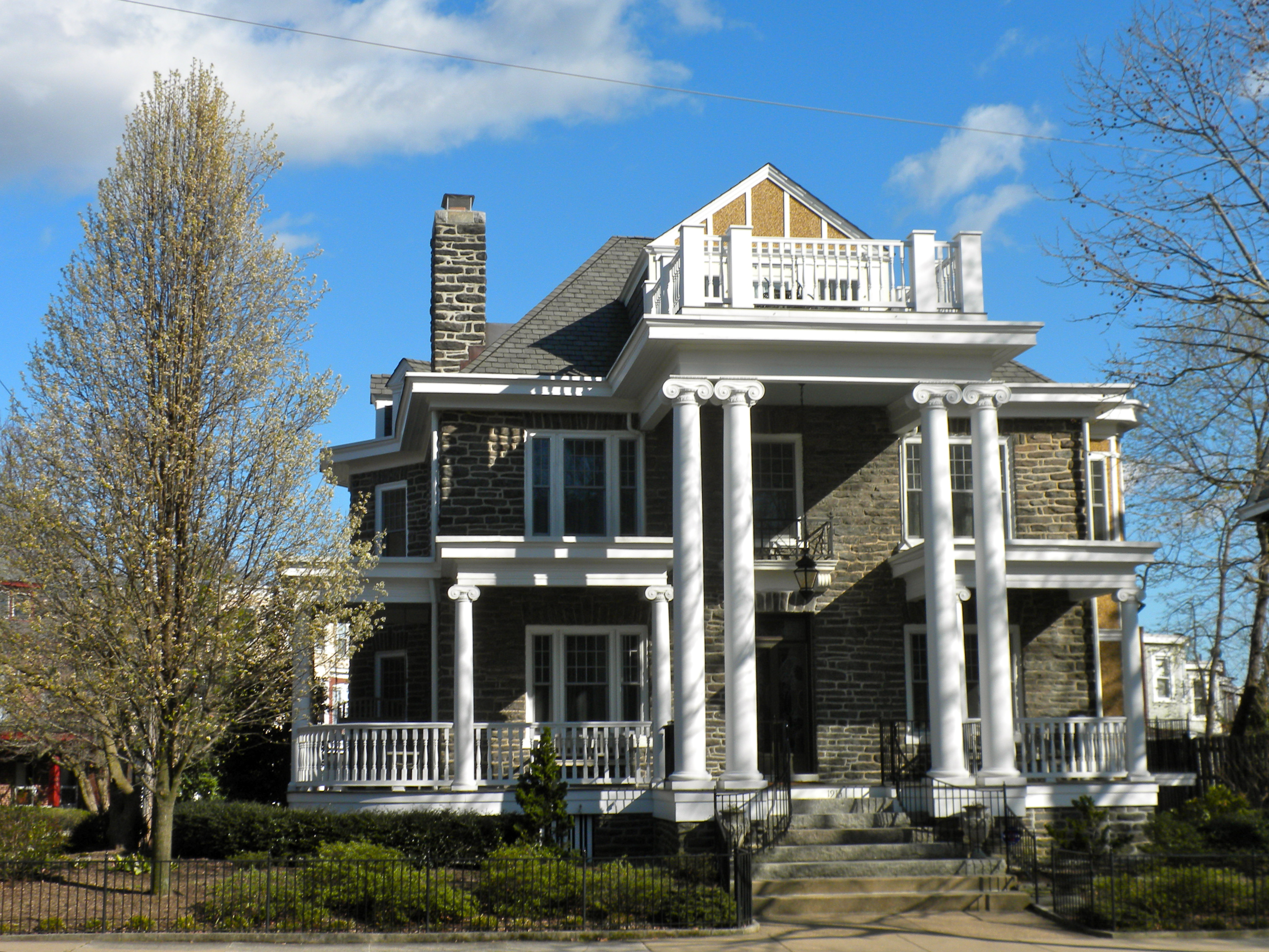
- House in the Baynard Boulevard Historic District, March 2010

- Location within Delaware Location within the United States
- Location: Baynard Blvd. between 18th St. and Concord Ave., Wilmington, Delaware
- Coordinates: 39.758143°N 75.544323°W
- Area: 24 acres (9.7 ha)
- Built: 1893
- Architectural style: Colonial Revival, Tudor Revival, Queen Anne
- NRHP reference No.: 79000631
- Added to NRHP: July 26, 1979

The Baynard Boulevard Historic District is a national historic district located at Wilmington, New Castle County, Delaware. It encompasses 77 contributing buildings with examples of Colonial Revival, Tudor Revival, and Queen Anne architecture. The area developed after being laid out in 1893, and is a prime example of a turn-of-the-20th-century American suburb, or "streetcar suburb." The dwellings date between 1895 and 1930. The district is predominantly residential. Also located in the district is the McCabe United Methodist Church, Beth Shalom Synagogue, Hanover Presbyterian Church, and No. 30 School.

It was added to the National Register of Historic Places in 1979.

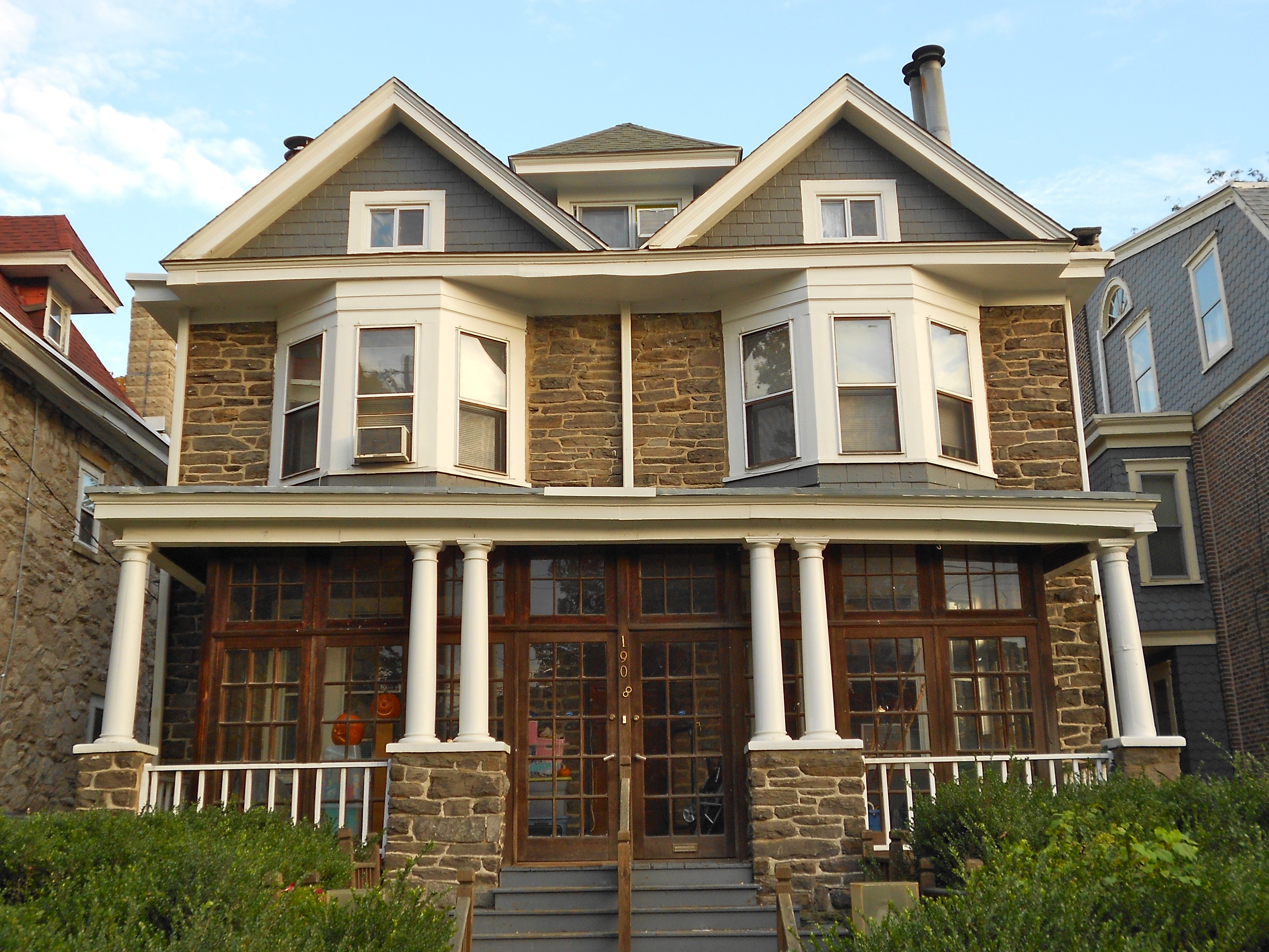
1908 Baynard Blvd.

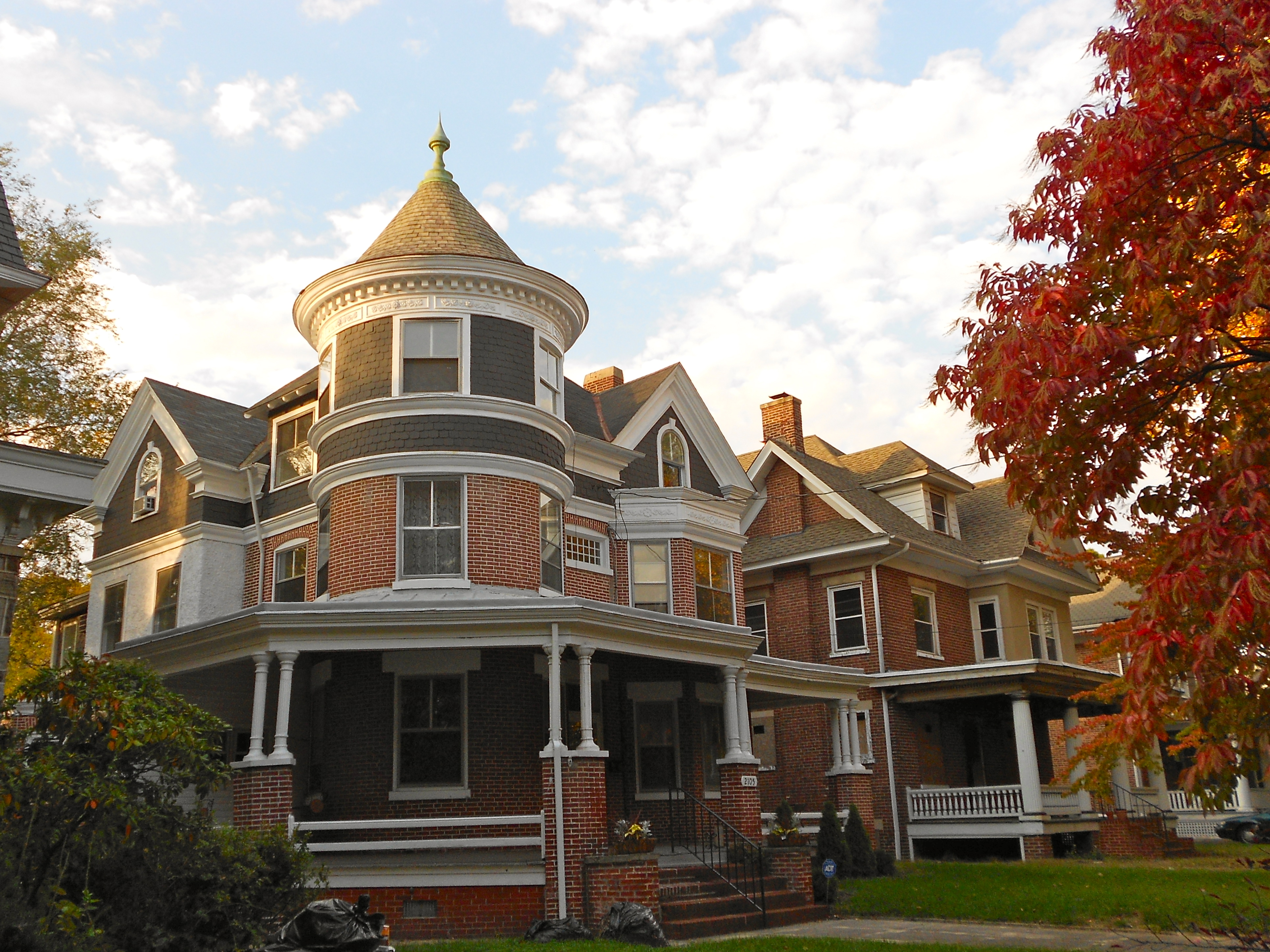
2105 Baynard Blvd.

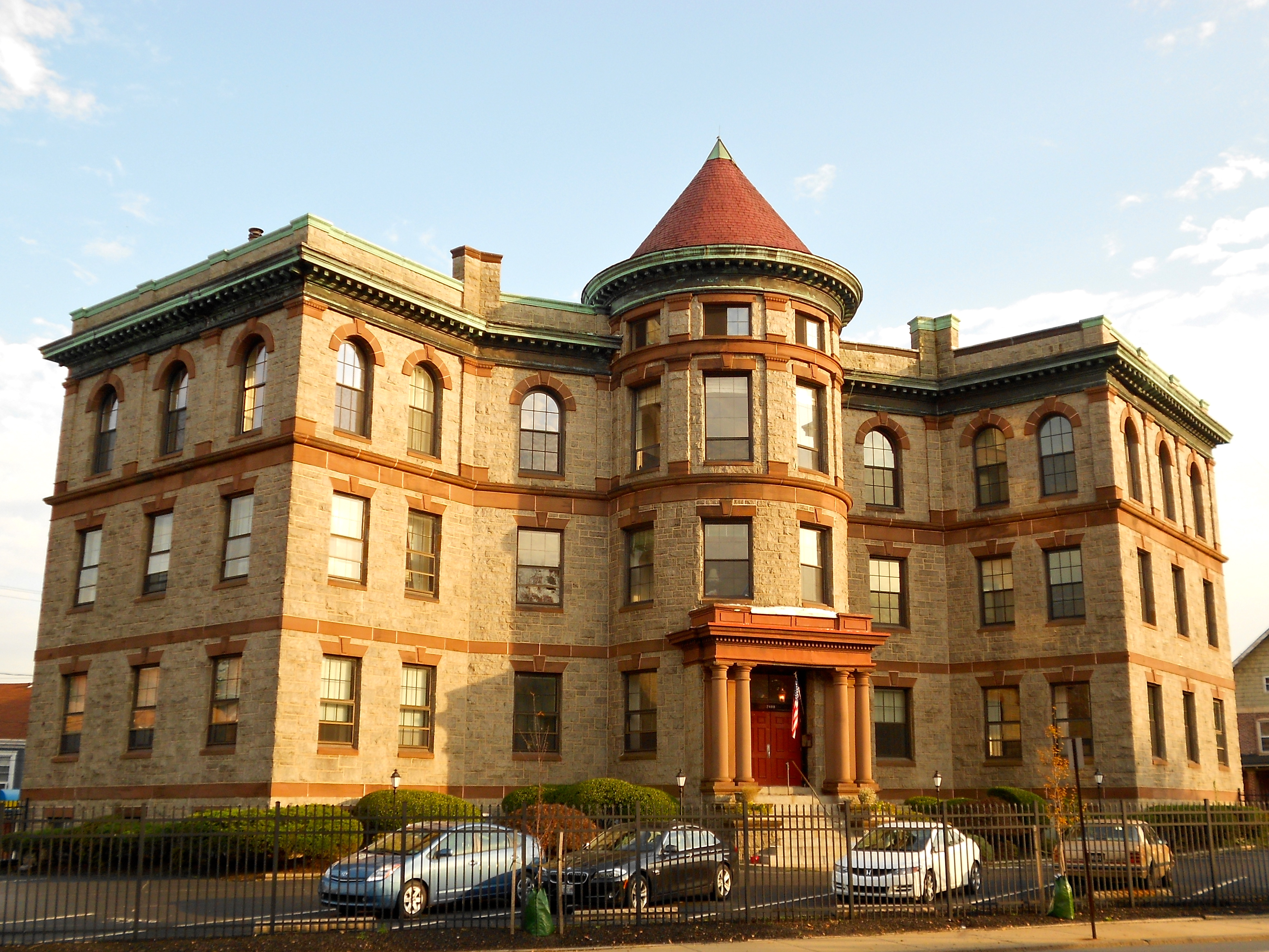
No. 30 School

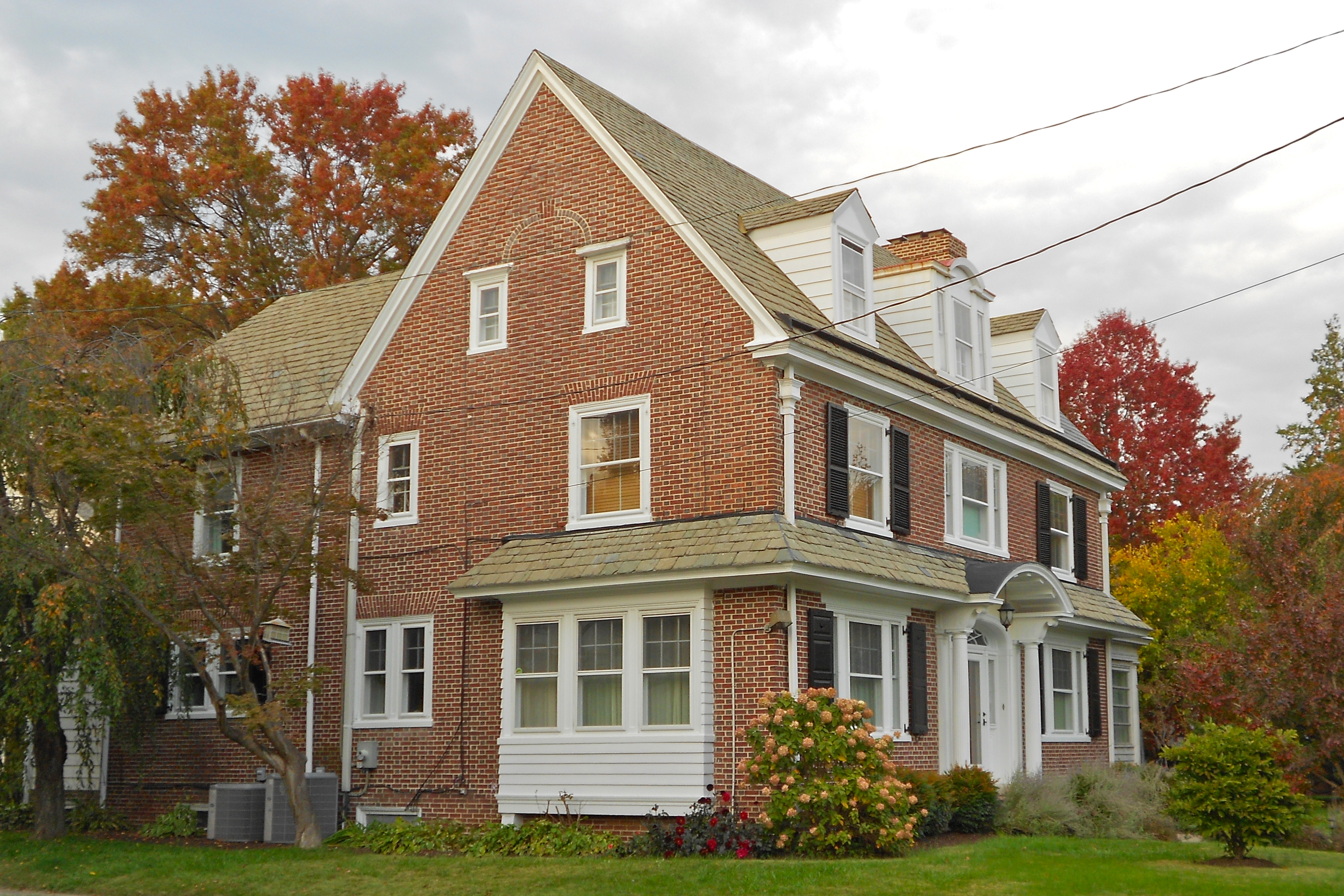
2401 Baynard Blvd.

== Education ==
It is in the Red Clay Consolidated School District. It is zoned to Evan G. Shortlidge Academy (Kindergarten-Grade 2), Emalea P. Warner Elementary School (grades 2–5), Skyline Middle School (6–8), and John Dickinson School (9–12).
