= André Harvey =

André Harvey may refer to:

- André Harvey (MP) (born 1941), Canadian member of the House of Commons of Canada
- André Harvey (MNA) (born 1939), Canadian member of the National Assembly of Quebec
- André Harvey (sculptor) (1941–2018), American sculptor
