= Diamond State =

Diamond State may refer to:

- The U.S. State of Delaware, unofficially nicknamed "The Diamond State"
  - Diamond State Athletic Conference, a high school sports league
- The U.S. State of Arkansas has the symbol of the diamond on its official state flag and has often been referred to as "The Diamond State" since the discovery of diamonds there in 1906.
  - Crater of Diamonds State Park
- SS Diamond State, a crane ship of the United States Navy
