= Breck's Mill Area =

Historic district in Delaware, US

- Breck's Mill Area – Henry Clay Village Historic District
- U.S. National Register of Historic Places
- U.S. Historic district
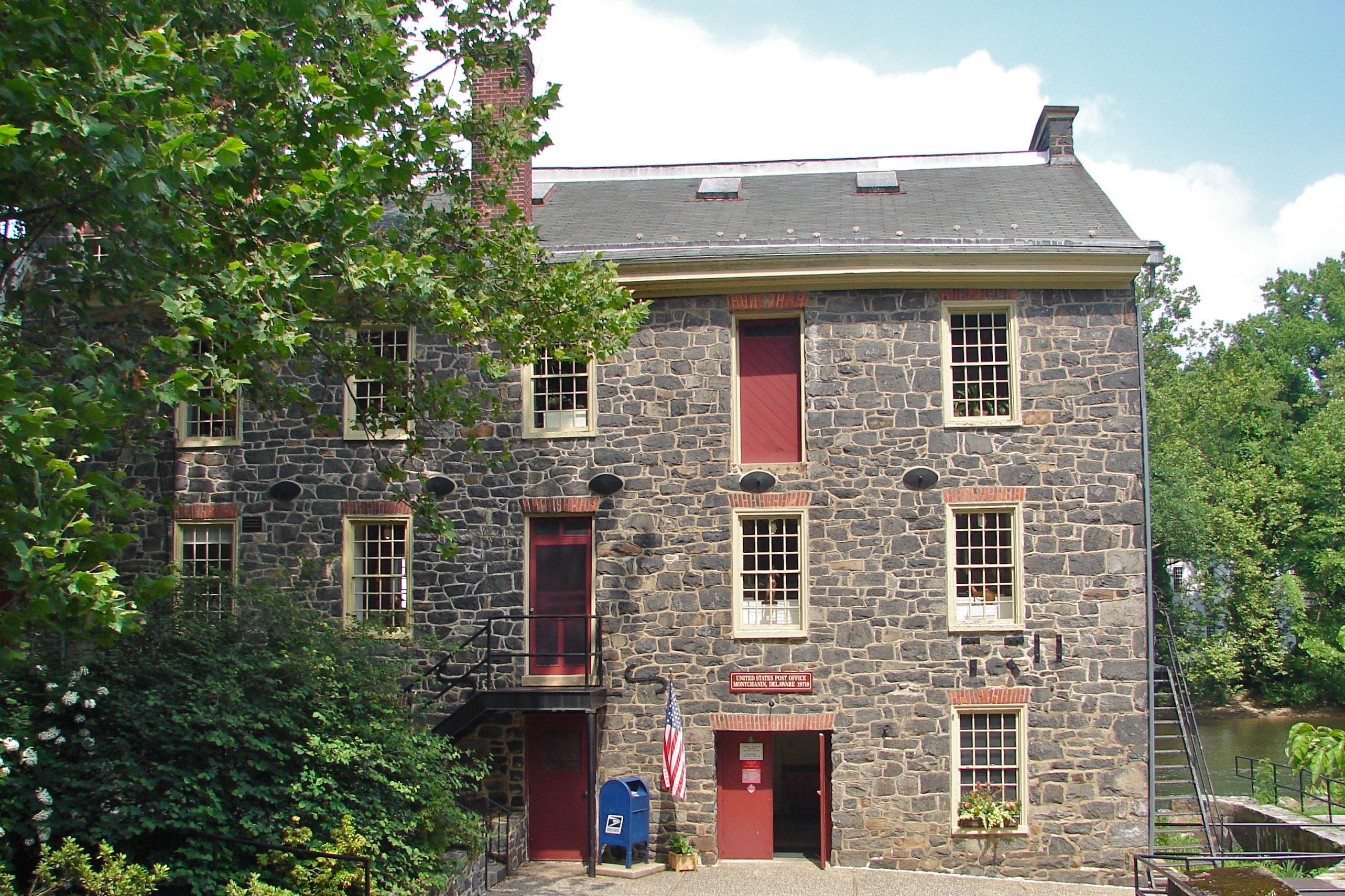
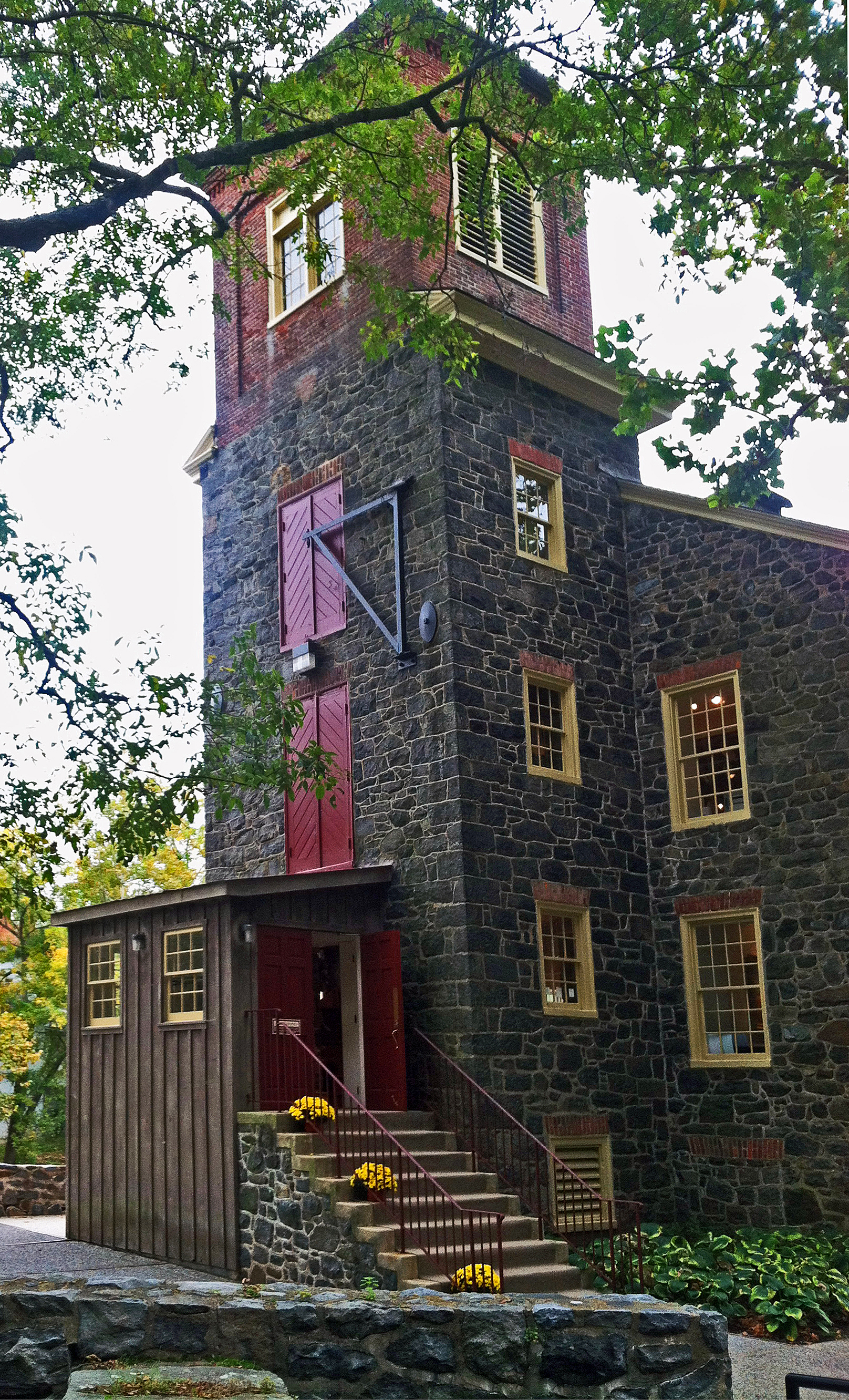
- Brecks Mill, June 2011 Breck's Mill bell tower, October 2014.

- Location within Delaware Location within the United States
- Location: Breck's Lane and Creek Rd., New Castle County, Delaware (Wilmington address)
- Coordinates: 39.769946°N 75.580572°W
- Area: 110 acres (45 ha)
- Built: 1813
- Architectural style: Federal, Late 19th And 20th Century Revivals, Mid 19th Century Revival, Late Victorian
- NRHP reference No.: 71000230, 87000663 (Boundary Increase), 87000683 (Boundary Decrease)
- Added to NRHP: November 5, 1971, January 25, 1988

Breck's Mill Area, also known as Breck's Mill Area-Henry Clay Village Historic District, is a national historic district located along Brandywine Creek in unincorporated New Castle County, Delaware, United States, near Wilmington. It encompasses 56 contributing buildings, five contributing sites, and three contributing structures. The district encompasses The Mill, The Workers' houses, and The Mill Owner's Home.

Breck's Mill was built in 1813 and rebuilt in 1846 after a fire. It is a three-story, stone structure measuring 55 feet by 43 feet. It features a stone bell tower with a top floor of brick. The Henry Clay Village area includes small single or double workers' houses, the Charles I. du Pont house (1823), Ernest du Pont house (1916), William F. Raskob house, Hagee's Tavern, Greenhill Presbyterian Church, and the original building for the Alexis I. duPont High School (1893).

"Rokeby" was built in 1836, and is a two-story, rectangular dwelling in a late Federal style. It measures 55 feet wide and 26 feet, 4 inches, deep, and features a two-story portico overlooking the Brandywine. It was built by mill owner William Breck for his new wife Gabrielle du Pont and is thought to be modeled on Louviers. The mill closed in 1854. It has been a recreational center off and on since 1890. Breck's Mill houses the post office for Montchanin, Delaware, Somerville Manning Gallery, and André Harvey's sculpture studio.

It was added to the National Register of Historic Places in 1971 and amended in 1988.
