= Diamond State Athletic Conference =

High school athletic conference in Delaware, US

The Diamond State Athletic Conference is a high school sports conference organized in 2007, featuring charter and private schools in New Castle County, Delaware. The teams participate in a variety of sports including football, boys and girls soccer, track and field, cross country, boys and girls basketball, boys and girls indoor track, boys and girls outdoor track, wrestling, boys and girls lacrosse, baseball, softball, cheerleading, boys and girls swimming, and field hockey. Conference titles (and an automatic berth to state tournaments) are awarded based on the best record at the end of the regular season or in championship competitions between the schools.

== Membership and history ==
Members as of the 2025–2026 school year include:

- Archmere Academy (original member, 2007)
- Charter School of Wilmington (joined in 2017)
- Conrad Schools of Science (joined in 2011)
- Delaware Military Academy (original member, 2007)
- First State Military Academy (joined in 2017)
- MOT Charter School (joined in 2017)
- Newark Charter School (joined in 2015)
- St. Elizabeth High School (joined in 2021)

Seven of the eight schools in the conference are classified by DIAA as Division II schools (Wilmington Charter is classified as a Division I school).

Former members of the conference include:

- St. Thomas More Academy (Delaware)
- Campus Community School
- Delmarva Christian High School
- Wilmington Christian School
- Red Lion Christian Academy

A similarly named conference that consisted of large schools from Kent and Sussex County existed until the 1969–70 school year when the Henlopen Conference was formed. Members until 1969 were: Smyrna, Dover, Caesar Rodney, Milford, Seaford, Lewes, Georgetown and Middletown; Middletown being the lone member from New Castle County.

== State championships ==
Total number of State Champions by members of the conference in the Fall, Winter and Spring sports seasons. Years listed may predate membership in the conference.

- Archmere Academy (31)
  - Fall (19) - Football 2A (2021, 1982, 1980, 1979), Boys Soccer DII (2019), Girls Volleyball (2014, 1987, 1986), Boys XC DII (2008, 2007, 2004, 2002, 2000, 1997, 1995, 1994, 1991), Girls XC DII (2003, 1992)
  - Spring (12) - Softball (1990), Boys Tennis (2002, 1993, 1992, 1982, 1981), Girls Tennis (2009, 2007, 1993, 1986, 1985), Girls Soccer DII (2023)
- Charter School of Wilmington (17)
  - Fall (7) - Girls Volleyball (2019), Boys XC DI (2019, 2015), Girls XC DI (2012, 2011, 2010, 2009)
  - Winter (9) - Boys Swimming and Diving (2016), Girls Swimming and Diving (2015, 2014, 2013, 2012, 2011, 2010, 2009, 2008)
  - Spring (1) - Girls Soccer DI (2005)
- St. Elizabeth High School (10)
  - Fall (3) - Football 2A (2010, 1996, 1994)
  - Winter (7) - Boys Basketball (2018), Girls Basketball (2021, 2013, 2007, 1985, 1982, 1979)
- Delaware Military Academy (6)
  - Fall (2) - Girls Volleyball (2016, 2015)
  - Winter (1) - Dual Team Wrestling (2023)
  - Spring (2) - Baseball (2023, 2021), Girls Soccer DII (2018)
- Newark Charter School (5)
  - Fall (3) - Unified Flag Football (2023, 2017, 2016)
  - Winter (2) - Girls Swimming and Diving (2019, 2018)
- Conrad Schools of Science (1)
  - Winter (2) - Girls Basketball (2018, 2026)
- First State Military Academy (0)
- MOT Charter School (0)
