= Thomas McKean High School =

Location
- 301 McKennan's Church Rd; Wilmington, Delaware 19808; United States; 39°45′27″N 75°40′00″W

Information
- Type: Public
- Motto: It's a great day to be a highlander
- Established: 1966 (60 years ago)
- School district: Red Clay Consolidated School District
- CEEB code: 080203
- Principal: Reginald Worlds
- Grades: 9–12
- Enrollment: 870 (2023-2024)
- Colors: Green, white and navy
- Athletics conference: Blue Hen Conference - Flight B
- Mascot: Highlander
- Rival: Dickinson
- Accreditation: Middle States Association's Commission on Secondary Schools
- Website: mckean.redclayschools.com

Thomas McKean High School is a comprehensive public high school located on 301 McKennan's Church Road in unincorporated New Castle County, Delaware, with a Wilmington postal address. It is a part of the Red Clay Consolidated School District. The school opened in December 1966, and its first class graduated in June 1967.

McKean serves, in addition to portions of Wilmington, Elsmere, and portions of Pike Creek and Hockessin. A sliver of Pike Creek Valley coincides with the McKean zone.

== History ==
In 2026 the school district stated that McKean would no longer be a standalone school and instead become a center that provides assistance on academic matters, and that students would be moved to the other comprehensive high schools in the district. In response some students protested. In April of that year, the board of trustees put an indefinite hold on the plan.

== Traditions ==
Having selected Thomas McKean, a signer of the United States Declaration of Independence, as its namesake, the school followed several traditions associated with the Scottish heritage of Thomas McKean. The mascot is a fierce Highlander, wearing a kilt made of the tartan of the Clan MacDonald. Among the dominant colors of the plaid are blue and green, the school's colors. In addition, the names of the school newspaper - Minstrel - and the yearbook - Talisman - reflect the culture of the Scottish Highlands.

== Physical building ==
Originally designed as a model school for flexible scheduling, the building has several unique features and has proven adaptable to many situations. The school expanded in 1972, adding a new wing to the building as well as adding ninth grade to the student body. Thus, the class of 1976 was the first to spend four years at McKean. The school is currently undergoing construction to update the labs and slowly upgrading the school's internal computer network. A new band room and several other new rooms are also being constructed.

== Student body ==
In 2020 about 20% of the students lived in the City of Wilmington. Almost all of them were Hispanic/Latino and/or African-American. Cris Barrish and Mark Eichmann of WHYY stated that McKean is "A school that matches Wilmington's demographics".

== Academic performance ==
Circa 2021 about 5% of the students were proficient in mathematics and below 25% in English at grade level per Delaware state guidelines, respectively. Barrish and Eichmann wrote "McKean's performance is the opposite of Cab and Charter."

== Notable alumni ==
- Anthony Anderson, football player
- Tripp Keister, baseball coach
- Tom Verlaine, singer and guitarist of the rock band Television
- Randy White, former professional football player inducted into the NFL Hall of Fame and College Football Hall of Fame; played 14 seasons with the Dallas Cowboys, including Super Bowl XXI of which he was named MVP
