= MOT Charter School =

Location
- 1156 Levels Road / 1275 Cedar Lane Road; Middletown, Delaware 19709; United States; 39.500018°N 75.691459°W

Information
- Type: Charter school
- Established: 2002
- School district: MOT Charter School
- NCES School ID: 100001900123
- Head of school: Edward B. Southworth, IV
- Teaching staff: 76.00 (on an FTE basis)
- Grades: K–12
- Enrollment: 1,390 (2025–2026)
- Student to teacher ratio: 17.29
- Campuses: 2
- Athletics conference: Diamond State Athletic Conference (high school)
- Mascot: Mustang
- Website: www.motcharter.com

MOT Charter School is a charter school in New Castle County, Delaware, United States. It was established in 2002 and operates on two campuses. The K-8 Academy is in the city limits of Middletown, while the high school is in an unincorporated area outside of the Middletown city limits.

MOT means "Middletown, Odessa, and Townsend".

== History ==
MOT Charter School was established in 2002 as a K–8 charter school. In June 2013, the Delaware State Board of Education approved MOT Charter's request to add a high school beginning in the 2014–2015 school year. Although the high school building was not yet completed for the 2014–2015 school year, the school expanded to ninth grade as planned, adding tenth grade in 2015–2016, eleventh grade in 2016–2017, and twelfth grade in 2017–2018, making the class of 2018 the first class to graduate from the high school.

Admissions

Students are admitted to MOT Charter School using a lottery system. An open enrollment process is conducted annually; the process is set by Delaware regulations and runs from the first Monday in November until the second Wednesday in January. If the number of students applying for admission is greater than the number of seats available, a public lottery is run, with lottery winners invited to enroll in the school, and other students placed on a wait-list in the order determined by the lottery. If the number of students applying for admission is less than the number of seats available, all applicants are invited to enroll in the school.

== Academics ==
MOT Charter High School's first graduating class, in 2018.

== Athletics ==
=== High school ===
MOT Charter High School is a member of the Diamond State Athletic Conference. The Mustangs compete in Division II for sports in which the DIAA has split schools into divisions for playoffs or state championship meets. MOT Charter High School fields teams in all three sports seasons.

The boys lacrosse team began varsity competition in the 2016–2017 school year. The varsity swim team was founded in the 2017–2018 school year.
