= Jim Bundren =

American football player (born 1974)

No. 65
- Position: Guard

Personal information
- Born: October 6, 1974 (age 52); Pontiac, Michigan, U.S.
- Listed height: 6 ft 3 in (1.91 m)
- Listed weight: 303 lb (137 kg)

Career information
- High school: Alexis I. duPont (Wilmington, Delaware)
- College: Clemson (1994–1997)
- NFL draft: 1998: 7th round, 210th overall pick
- Expansion draft: 1999: 1st round, 23rd overall pick

Career history
- Miami Dolphins (1998)*; New York Jets (1998); Cleveland Browns (1999–2000); Miami Dolphins (2002)
- * Offseason or practice squad member only

Awards and highlights
- Third-team All-American (1997); 2× First-team All-ACC (1996, 1997)

Career NFL statistics
- Games played: 27
- Games started: 10
- Fumble recoveries: 1
- Stats at Pro Football Reference

Jim G. Bundren (born October 6, 1974) is an American former professional football player who was an offensive guard for two seasons with the Cleveland Browns of the National Football League (NFL). He was selected by the Miami Dolphins in the seventh round of the 1998 NFL draft. Bundren played college football for the Clemson Tigers. He was also a member of the New York Jets and Miami Dolphins.

== Early life ==
Bundren attended Alexis I. duPont High School in Greenville, Delaware. He earned first-team All-State honors and was a two-way starter in the Delaware Blue-Gold All-Star game. He was inducted into the Delaware Sports Hall of Fame in 2007. He also played one year at Valley Forge Military Academy and College in Wayne, Pennsylvania.

== College career ==
Bundren was a four-year starter at left tackle for the Tigers at Clemson University from 1994 to 1997. He started 47 games in his college career and earned All-Atlantic Coast Conference honors. He was also chosen second-team All-American by Football News and third-team All-American by the Associated Press and Sporting News his senior year. Bundren was named first-team academic All-ACC in 1996 and 1997.

== Professional career ==
Bundren was selected by the Miami Dolphins in the seventh round with the 210th pick in the 1998 NFL draft. He was released by the Dolphins on August 31, 2014. He was claimed off waivers by the New York Jets on August 31, 1998. Bundren spent the 1999 and 2000 NFL seasons playing for the Cleveland Browns. He was released by the Browns on August 29, 2001. He signed with the Miami Dolphins on January 17, 2002. Bundren was waived/injured by the Dolphins on August 6, 2002. He was released on February 26, 2003.
