= List of Delaware High School Non-Conference Schools =

Some Delaware high schools are not aligned with a Delaware Interscholastic Athletic Association conference.

- Mt. Sophia Academy
- Caravel Academy
- Salesianum School
- Delaware Academy Of Public Safety and Security
- Delmarva Christian High School
- St. Thomas More
- Centreville Layton High School
- Freire Charter Wilmington
- Delaware Design-Lab High School
