= Pike Creek Valley, Delaware =

Census-designated place in Delaware, United States

- Census-designated place
- Location in New Castle County and the state of Delaware.

- Location within the state of Delaware Pike Creek Valley (the United States)
- Coordinates: 39°44′10″N 75°41′54″W
- Country: United States
- State: Delaware
- County: New Castle

Area
  - Total: 2.87 sq mi (7.44 km^{2})
  - Land: 2.87 sq mi (7.43 km^{2})
  - Water: 0 sq mi (0.00 km^{2})
- Elevation: 239 ft (73 m)

Population (2020)
  - Total: 11,692
  - Density: 4,073.1/sq mi (1,572.63/km^{2})
- Time zone: UTC-6 (Central (CST))
  - Summer (DST): UTC-5 (CDT)
- Area code: 302
- GNIS feature ID: 215930

Pike Creek Valley is a census-designated place in New Castle County, Delaware, United States. As of the 2020 census, Pike Creek Valley had a population of 11,692.

== Education ==
=== K-12 education ===
Most of Pike Creek Valley is in the Christina School District while some is in the Red Clay Consolidated School District.

The portion in the Christina district is zoned to Etta J. Wilson Elementary School, Shue/Medill Middle School, and Newark High School. Grades 5-6 were previously assigned to Bancroft Intermediate School in Wilmington.

Zoned elementary schools of the Red Clay section include Heritage Elementary School, and Linden Hill Elementary School. All of Pike Creek Valley in Red Clay is zoned to Skyline Middle School. Most of Pike Creek Valley in Red Clay is zoned to John Dickinson High School, and a very small segment coincides with McKean High School.

=== Colleges and universities ===
Goldey–Beacom College is in the CDP.

== Demographics ==
Historical population
Census	Pop.	Note	%±
2010	11,217		—
2020	11,692		4.2%
U.S. Decennial Census

=== 2020 census ===
As of the 2020 census, Pike Creek Valley had a population of 11,692. The median age was 39.8 years. 18.1% of residents were under the age of 18 and 18.5% of residents were 65 years of age or older. For every 100 females there were 86.0 males, and for every 100 females age 18 and over there were 84.1 males age 18 and over.

100.0% of residents lived in urban areas, while 0.0% lived in rural areas.

There were 5,239 households in Pike Creek Valley, of which 24.2% had children under the age of 18 living in them. Of all households, 39.5% were married-couple households, 19.3% were households with a male householder and no spouse or partner present, and 33.3% were households with a female householder and no spouse or partner present. About 35.0% of all households were made up of individuals and 13.0% had someone living alone who was 65 years of age or older.

There were 5,472 housing units, of which 4.3% were vacant. The homeowner vacancy rate was 1.1% and the rental vacancy rate was 5.5%.

Racial composition as of the 2020 census
Race	Number	Percent
White	8,214	70.3%
Black or African American	1,259	10.8%
American Indian and Alaska Native	33	0.3%
Asian	1,128	9.6%
Native Hawaiian and Other Pacific Islander	2	0.0%
Some other race	200	1.7%
Two or more races	856	7.3%
Hispanic or Latino (of any race)	756	6.5%
