= Bill Hawke =

American baseball player (1870–1902)

- Pitcher
- Born: April 28, 1870; Elsmere, Delaware, US
- Died: December 11, 1902 (aged 32); Wilmington, Delaware, US
- Batted: Right Threw: Right

MLB debut
- July 28, 1892, for the St. Louis Browns

Last MLB appearance
- September 30, 1894, for the Baltimore Orioles

MLB statistics
- Win–loss record: 32–31
- Strikeouts: 193
- Earned run average: 4.98
- Stats at Baseball Reference

Teams
- St. Louis Browns (1892–1893); Baltimore Orioles (1893–1894)

Career highlights and awards
- Pitched a No-hitter on August 16, 1893

William Victor Hawke (April 28, 1870 – December 11, 1902) was an American Major League Baseball player who pitched for three seasons, all in the National League, with a career record of 32 wins and 31 losses.

== Career ==
Born in Elsmere, Delaware, Hawke began his major league career with the St. Louis Browns in 1892. He pitched in 14 games that first season, with a 5–5 win–loss record and threw one shutout. Bill split 1893 season between the Browns and the Baltimore Orioles. It was for the latter that he pitched a no-hit, 5-0 victory against the Washington Senators on August 16, 1893. It was the first no-hitter at the new distance from the pitcher's mound to home plate. For the 1893 season, the mound was moved from 50 feet to 60 feet 6 inches, the distance that is still used to this day. Hawke finished his career the following season, with a 16-9 record for the National League champion Baltimore Orioles.

== Post-career ==
On December 11, 1902, he died of carcinoma at the age of 32 in Wilmington, Delaware, and was interred at Wilmington and Brandywine Cemetery in Wilmington.

He was inducted into the Delaware Sports Hall of Fame in 1992.

== See also ==
- List of Major League Baseball no-hitters

Achievements
Preceded by Bumpus Jones	No-hitter pitcher August 16, 1893	Succeeded by Cy Young
