= Cab Calloway School of the Arts =

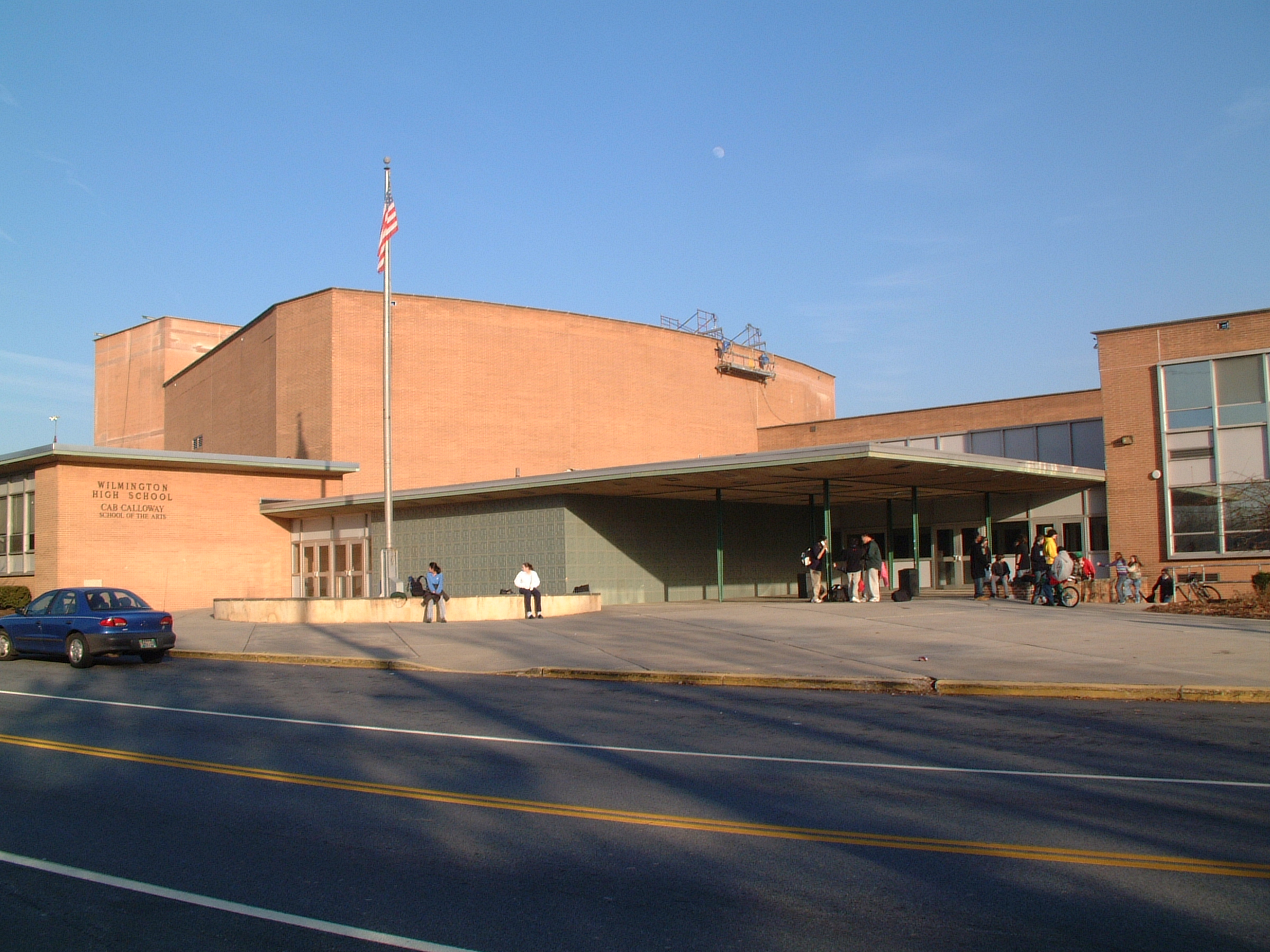

Location
- 100 N. DuPont Rd; Wilmington, Delaware 19807; United States; 39°45′13″N 75°35′15″W

Information
- Type: Public secondary art school
- Motto: "A community where the energy of arts and academics unite!"
- Established: 1992 (34 years ago)
- School district: Red Clay Consolidated School District
- CEEB code: 080157
- Dean: Anthony Gray-Bolden
- Teaching staff: 48.00 (2024-2025) (FTE)
- Grades: 6–12
- Enrollment: 941 (2024-2025)
- Student to teacher ratio: 19.60 (2024-2025)
- Website: cabcallowayschool.org

Cab Calloway School of the Arts (CCSA) is an arts-oriented magnet school in Wilmington, Delaware, operated by the Red Clay Consolidated School District. The school offers grades six through twelve and each student chooses a particular focus in the field of arts that they study throughout school; they must take an assessment or audition in this area upon applying.

== History ==
The building that currently houses Cab Calloway is the former location of Wilmington High School Cab was established in 1992 by a group of parents who wanted their children to have an arts-centered education; for the first six years, Cab existed as Red Clay's Creative and Performing Arts Middle School, offering sixth and seventh grades and operating out of an empty wing of Wilmington High. When Wilmington closed in 1999 due in part to decreasing enrollment, Cab took up residence in the rest of the school and expanded into the 6-12 institution it is today. Today, Cab Calloway School of the Arts shares the building campus with the Charter School of Wilmington. In homage to Wilmington, Cab kept the words "Wilmington High" on the building near the entrance to honor its historic ties to the community. The school changed its name to Cab Calloway in 1993 as a tribute jazz singer and actor Cab Calloway's prolific career as well as a nod to the fact that he lived in nearby Hockessin in his old age.

The class of 2005 was the first to use the three-tiered diploma system, which would rank graduate degrees as "basic", "standard", or "distinguished", a controversial plan under Governor Ruth Ann Minner meant to standardize the school to better fit No Child Left Behind. When students, parents, faculty, and lawmakers criticized the three-tier system, it was reduced to a two-tier system, until the idea was abandoned altogether in 2005.

== School symbols ==
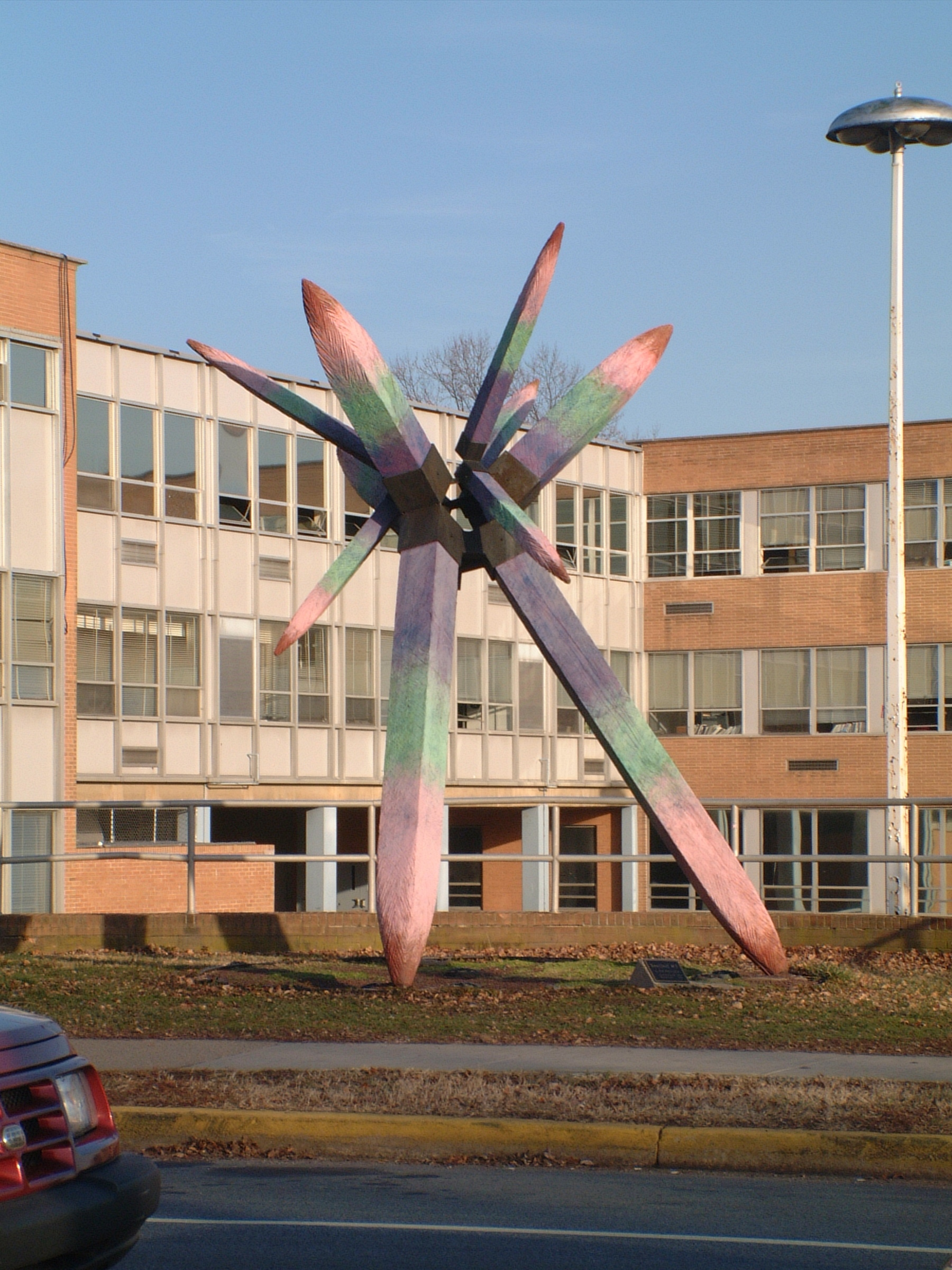
The Sentinel, a wooden figure outside the school

CCSA's fight song is "Minnie the Moocher" by Cab Calloway, despite its many references to drugs and prostitution. The school colors are silver, black, and purple and the mascot is The Spirit, though CCSA does not have athletics. CCSA students who want to participate in sports are able to join teams offered by the Charter School of Wilmington, whom they share a building with.

=== The Sentinel ===
In 2002, the city dedicated Sentinel #3 (known simply as Sentinel), a statue by Jim Paulsen, to CCSA to mark its tenth anniversary. Paulsen refurbished the wood and metal structure in early 2002 after vandals destroyed the initial design, unveiled in 1985. CCSA and Charter students helped with the restoration and the statue was moved from downtown Wilmington to the front of Cab Callway School in the fall of 2002. In 2003, Sentinel was again the target of vandalism; the perpetrator cut through one of the structure's supporting legs, which cost about $800 to repair. A fundraiser was held to cover the cost.

== Academics ==
CCSA students have the option to take courses offered by their building-mate the Charter School of Wilmington and vice versa. Delaware College of Art and Design (DCAD's) offers a dual-enrollment program where students can take courses such as animation or drawing; dual-enrollment students also have access to DCAD's many arts facilities such as studios and computer labs.

CCSA has consistently been ranked highly by organizations such as Newsweek and U.S. News & World Report for a number of years. In 2021, U.S. News & World Report ranked CCSA #338 of nearly 18,000 high schools in the United States.

== Arts ==
CCSA has nine majors to choose from: digital media and communication arts (web/print design, cinema/videography, photography, typography, digital audio production); dance; instrumental music; piano; strings; technical theatre (stage tech - high school only); theatre arts; visual arts; and vocal music.

In the fall of 2004, CCSA opened its own gallery, which has been used to showcase students and local artists. In 2009, the building underwent a $22 million renovation that focused on important upkeep such as ensuring doors were up to fire code, plumbing, HVAC system replacement, and window installation. In 2012, the 1,028-seat theatre was torn down and a $9.8 million theatre was built in its place. It opened in the fall of 2014.

=== Theatre ===
The Communication Arts department directs videography for most of the school and all shows are edited, produced, and/or live-streamed by students.

== Notable alumni ==
- Sarah McBride (class of 2009), U.S. congresswoman and transgender rights activist
- Anna Uzele (class of 2014), actress known for originating the role of Catherine Parr in the Broadway musical SIX
