= Delaware Military Academy =

- Talley Hall Building

Location
- 112 Middleboro Road; Wilmington, Delaware 19804; United States; 39°43′16″N 75°35′06″W

Information
- Type: Charter
- Motto: Scholarship, Leadership, Citizenship
- Founded: 2003 (23 years ago)
- Founders: Charles Baldwin; Jack Wintermantel
- School district: Red Clay Consolidated School District
- CEEB code: 080171
- Staff: 49 (2023-2024)
- Grades: 9-12
- Gender: Co-educational
- Enrollment: 584 (2023-2024)
- Hours in school day: 8.5
- Campus type: Suburban
- Colors: Navy, gold, and white
- Athletics conference: Diamond State Conference
- Mascot: Seahawk
- Accreditation: Middle States Rated Superior School 2006-2024
- Yearbook: The Porthole
- Communities served: New Castle County, Delaware
- Website: demilacad.org

The Delaware Military Academy (DMA) is a publicly-funded charter high school in unincorporated New Castle County, Delaware and has a Wilmington postal address. The Academy was founded in 2003 by Charles Baldwin, a retired Master Chief Petty Officer from the United States Navy, and Jack Wintermantel, a retired Colonel from the United States Army. All students are required to participate in the Navy Junior Reserve Officers Training Corps, or NJROTC; DMA is the first successful all-JROTC military charter school in the US. DMA offers grades nine through twelve and has been designated a Blue Ribbon School.

== Organization ==
All DMA students are referred to as cadets and the school is organized to reflect that of the US military and JROTC standards. While there are typical academic teachers and administrators, a number of faculty are retired from the military, and there are seven Naval Science Instructors (NSIs), six of whom teach, who oversee the military aspect of the school. Students are divided into one Regiment and each Regiment is divided into two Battalions(Alpha and Bravo) with four Companies each. Ranks are given based on honor, seniority, and academic excellence, with the highest student rank being the Cadet Commander.

== Academics ==
DMA is a college-preparatory school that offers honors, AP, and dual-enrollment classes through Delaware Technical and Community College.

The State of Delaware gave DMA a "Superior" ranking for high scores on standardized testing and they were named a Blue Ribbon School in 2019.

== Athletics ==
For much of its history, DMA has lacked sufficient athletics facilities and relied on nearby Banning Park and other high schools' facilities. In 2015, DMA purchased just under six additional acres of land with the intention of constructing a third building for this purpose and announced its plans for a gymnasium (called the "drill deck") in 2016. The Anthony N. Fusco, Sr. Athletic & Academic Center, a $6 million construction paid for by donors, opened in 2017. Shortly after, in 2019, a $2.5 million turf stadium was erected and named the Fusco Memorial Field.

In 2010, the ice hockey team became the first DMA team to go undefeated (19-0) and won the school's first championship by defeating Hodgson Vo-Tech High School in the Delaware Scholastic Hockey Association B Division Championship finals. Two years later, they won the school's first varsity championship by defeating Alexis I. duPont High School and solidified their place in the A Division.

== Notable alumni ==
- Patrick Clark, football player
