= Newark Charter School =

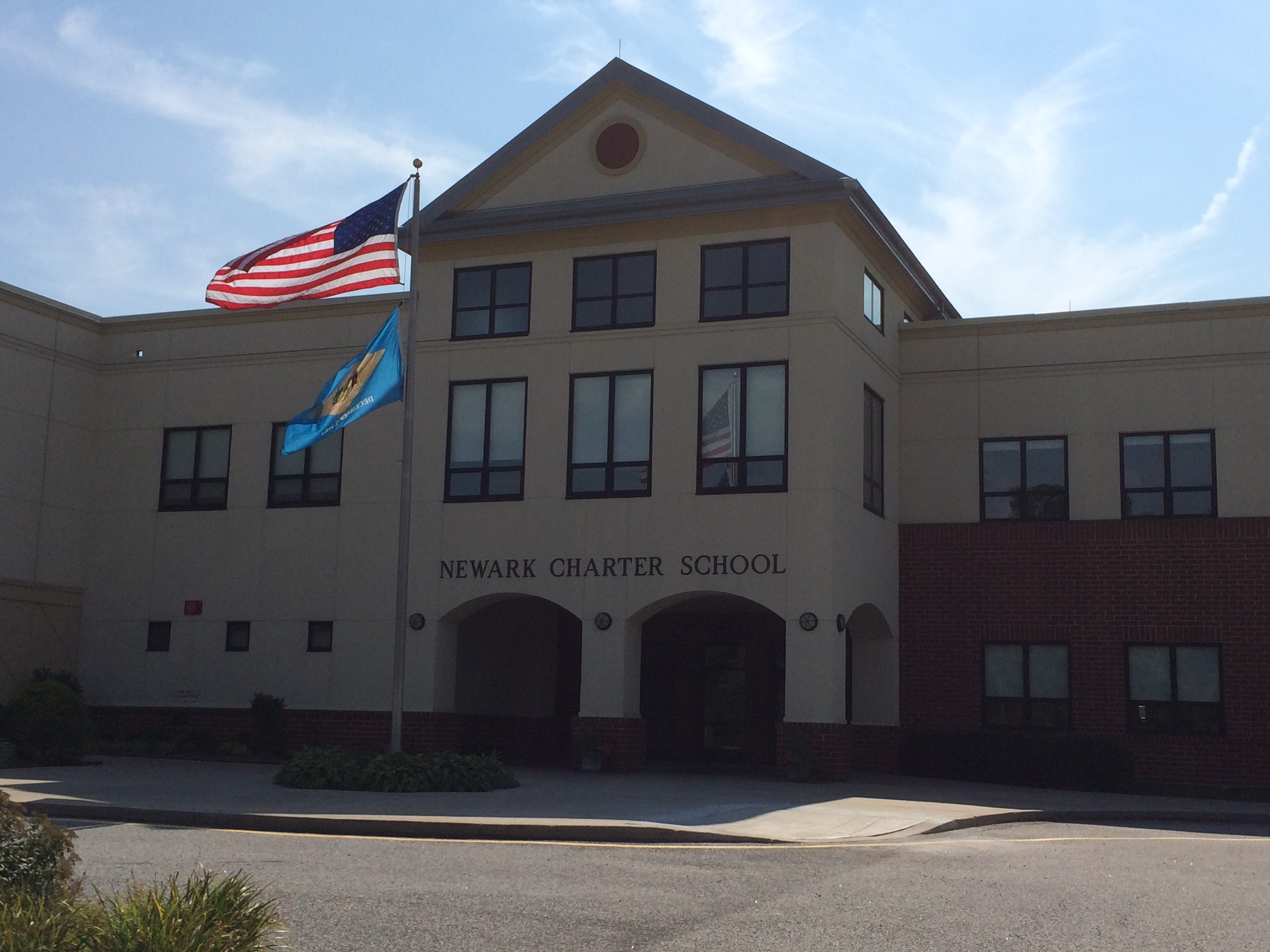
- The original Newark Charter School building, now used as the intermediate school

Location
- 2001 Patriot Way (K-5); 1089 Elkton Road (6-8); 200 McIntire Drive (9-12); Newark, New Castle County, Delaware 19711; United States: 39°39′45″N 75°46′32″W; 39°39′34″N 75°46′43″W; 39°39′11″N 75°47′16″W

Information
- Type: Charter school
- Motto: "Excellence in Academics and Decorum"
- Established: 2001 (25 years ago)
- School district: Newark Charter School
- CEEB code: 080126
- Director: Gregory Meece (2001-2019); Frank Newton (2019-2023); Sam Golder (2023-Current)
- Faculty: 166 (FTE) (2022-2023)
- Employees: 214
- Grades: K-12
- Enrollment: 3,005 (2022-2023)
- Colors: Red, white, blue
- Mascot: Patriots
- Website: newarkcharterschool.org

Newark Charter School (NCS) is a public charter school located in Newark, Delaware, that serves children from kindergarten to twelfth grade using the Core Knowledge curriculum. 3,005 students were enrolled in the school for the 2022–23 school year. It has two campuses, the Greg R. Meece Campus with three buildings for elementary (K-2), intermediate (3-5), and junior high (6-8) and the McIntire Drive Campus with the senior high school (9-12) that includes a sports complex and a performing arts center.

== History ==
Newark Charter School's charter was approved by the Delaware State Board of Education in April 2000 and the middle school opened in September 2001. Shortly after the school opened, their students voted "the Patriot" as their mascot after the September 11 attacks and the school address was changed to 2001 Patriot Way. The charter was renewed in June 2004. An elementary school was opened in August 2007 and the charter was renewed for a second time in January 2010.

In April 2012, the Delaware state board of education voted unanimously to allow the addition of a high school, which made Newark Charter the state's first K-12 charter school. Newark Charter High School is located in the former Lear Corporation factory, which made car seats for the now closed Chrysler Newark Assembly plant. There were openings for 162 ninth graders in fall 2013, with another grade added each year. The first graduation took place in 2017 with a total of 154 students graduating. In 2020, the first students to complete the full K-12 program received diplomas. As of May 2024, 1303 students have graduated from Newark Charter High School.

In 2019, the school purchased the Delaware Freezer warehouse behind the Patriot Way campus to construct a new junior high school. In March 2021, the groundbreaking ceremony for the new building took place with construction continuing through the 2021-2022 school year. The new Junior High opened in time for the 2022-2023 school year with a reorganization of the existing buildings following suit. The Elementary school shifted from K-3 to K-2, the Intermediate school shifted from 4-6 to 3-5, and the McIntire Drive campus shifted from 7-12 to 9-12. To fund the construction, 600 additional seats were added in grades k-9 (50 per grade level).

In addition to the new Middle School, construction of a Commons Building also took place connecting the Elementary and Intermediate Schools in 2021. Opening in August 2021, the Commons Building featured new administrative offices along with a bus port, shared kitchen, classrooms, a new art room, and a larger library. In the fall of 2023, the athletic complex at the McIntire Drive campus, featuring a weight room, improved locker room facilities and a lighted stadium (Robert W. Gore Stadium) with a turf field and track (Boulden Brothers Field) opened.

The final part of the expansion features a new 600-seat performing arts center that has been finished in the winter of 2024.

== Athletics ==
The school joined the Diamond State Athletic Conference in the 2015–2016 school year. Since joining the Conference, the school has won 20 Conference Titles as of December 2023.

The Newark Charter Unified Flag Football team won state championships in 2016, 2017, and 2023.

The Newark Charter Girls Swim Team won the DIAA Division II championship in 2018 and 2019.

The school has finished second in state (or Division II) championship events nine times and third twice. 13 students have won state titles competing for the school and four relay teams have won state championships.

== School awards ==
The school was named a National Blue Ribbon School by the United States Department of Education in 2010, and in 2016 in the "Exemplary High Performing Schools" performance category.

The various campuses have been recognized by U.S. News & World Report in their annual "best schools" ranking.

- The Elementary grades (K-5) and Middle School grades (6-8) were both ranked #1 in the state in the most recent ranking in 2021.
- The High School was ranked as the #2 best High School in Delaware in 2024, 2022, 2021 and 2020.
- The highest national ranking for the High School was 191st in 2021 and its highest national charter ranking was 49th in 2021. National ranks are not given for Elementary or Middle School grade levels by U.S. News & World Report.

The school was named a Top Workplace in Delaware by The News Journal in 2011, 2012, 2014, 2015, and 2016.

The school was selected by the College Board in 2015 to implement their AP Capstone Program.

== Student recognition ==
One student has participated in MATHCOUNTS Nationals as a Delaware representative after placing 4th and 1st in 6th and 7th grades respectively.

One student has participated in the Scripps National Spelling Bee after winning the state title for Delaware. She finished 47th in the competition in 2016.

Two students have participated three times at the National Geography Bee after winning the state title for Delaware. Participating in 2011, 2015, and 2017, the highest finish for an NCS student at the bee was tied for 7th in 2017 (he participated in the finals that aired on television).

The Pathway programs at Newark Charter are amongst the most decorated in the state since the start of the High School in 2014.

- The Bio-tech Pathway is affiliated with the HOSA Program. Students in the program have "placed" 242 times (including 85 first place results) at the state level and 11 times at the National Competition (including four first place results). In addition, 8 students have been elected to state leadership positions as of 2024.
- The Business Pathway is affiliated with the Business Professionals of America Program. Students in the program have "placed" 143 times (including 68 first place results) at the state level and 27 times at the National Competition (including 11 first place results). In addition, 10 students have been elected to state leadership positions as of 2024.
- The Engineering Pathway is affiliated with the Technology Student Association Program. Students in the program have "placed" 131 times (including 52 first place results) at the state level and six times at the National Competition (including one first place result). In addition, 13 students have been elected to state leadership positions as of 2024.

Since 2013, the High School has won the state Project Citizen competition seven times, won five "Superior" national rankings, and has inspired seven legislative actions. Project Citizen is part of the ninth grade curriculum at the High School.

Since 2014, the High School has had 63 projects place at the state National History Day competition, including 23 state champions. In addition, three faculty members have been recognized by the Delaware Historical Society as state educator of the year (2019, 2020, and 2024). 43 student projects have advanced the National History Day competition with one project winning a National Award in 2021. National History Day is part of the tenth grade curriculum at the High School.

Since 2016, the High School has had a team win the Delaware Stock Market Challenge nine times. The Middle School won the state competition in its first year competing in 2024. The High School has also won the state Personal Finance Challenge four times, including the last three years (2022-2024). Both High School programs are part of the Economics curriculum at the High School and the Business Pathway at the Middle School.

Since 2017, the High School has had 28 national semi-finalists and seven winners of the National Merit Scholarship Program.

Since 2018, the High School has had seven students selected as part of the Presidential Scholars Program and 13 semi-finalists.

In 2024, the High School's Mock Trial team advanced to the Delaware Mock Trial Competition finals. As Delaware was hosting the National High School Mock Trial Championship, that team participated as the competition's "second team", finishing 21st out 48 (the best showing by a Delaware School since 2016).
