= Wilmington High School (Delaware) =

Public high school in Wilmington, Delaware

Coordinates: 39.7535°N 75.5875°W

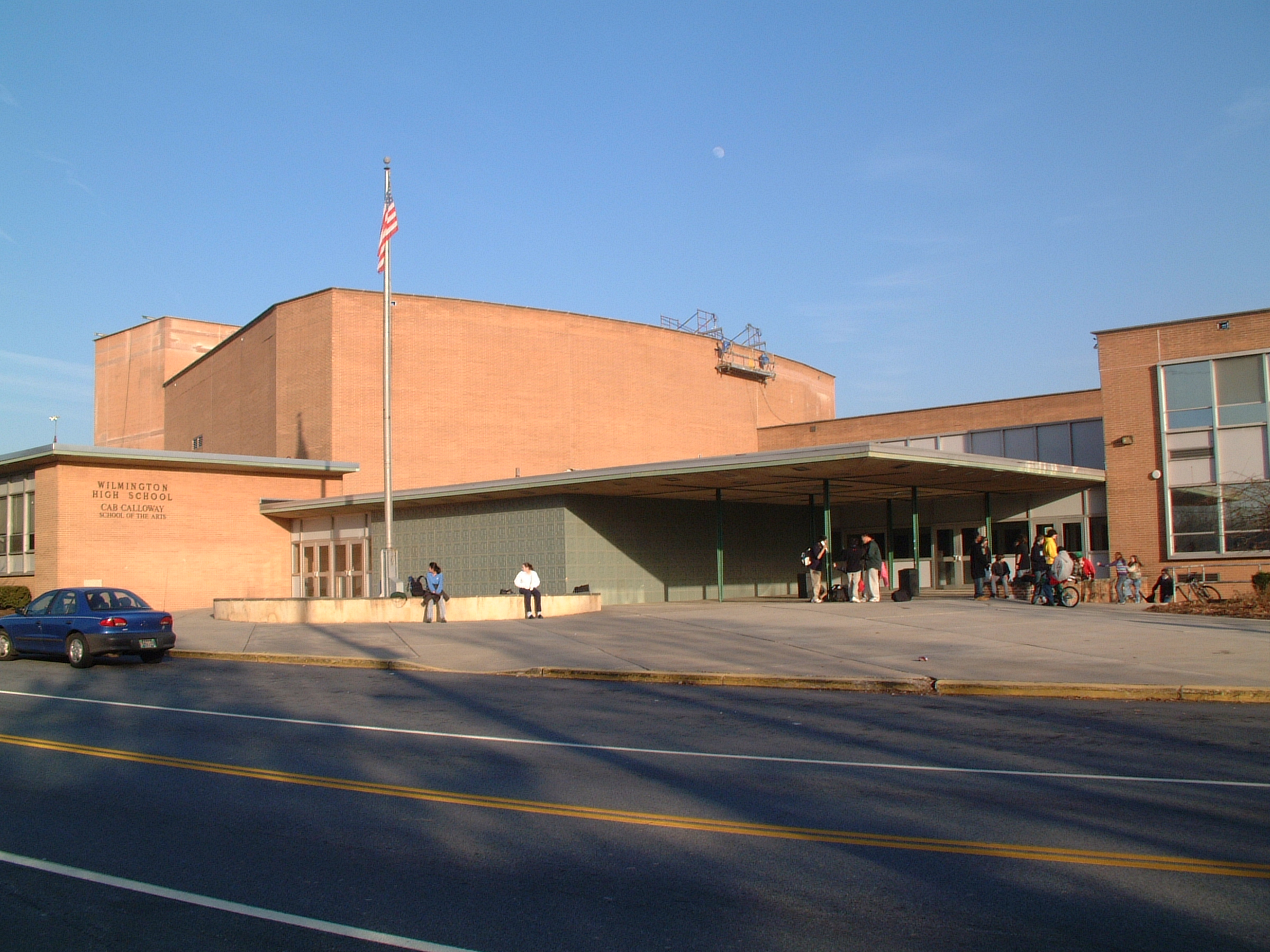
The former Wilmington High School

Wilmington High School was a public high school in Wilmington, Delaware. Its mascot was the red devils. It was the last traditional public high school in the Wilmington city limits.

== History ==
It was established in 1872. Initially black children were not permitted to enroll at Wilmington High, and they were only allowed to go to Howard High School.

In the middle of the 20th century the school racially integrated. Initially there were conflicts. In 1960 it moved into its final building. Alumnus Dr. Pete Grandell of Elsmere stated that racial tensions evaporated by the 1960s. The school became mostly African-American by the 1970s.

The school's final building was designed by Wilmington architects Whiteside, Moeckel & Carbonell.

After 1978 a desegregation order resulted in the Wilmington area being divided amongst several school districts. Wilmington High remained open as part of the Red Clay School District. New Castle County School District was created in 1978, and then was divided into four school districts in 1981.

Eventually the student population of Wilmington High decreased, resulting in its closure. It closed in 1999.

== Student body ==
It had 1,069 students, 77% white and 22% black, in 1964.

It had 1,967 students, 71% black and 24% white, in 1973.

== Notable alumni ==
- Paul Chadick, basketball player
- Ira Pierce, chemist
- Herm Reitzes, sportscaster
- Ernie Watts,Jazz Saxophonist

== See also ==
- P. S. Dupont High School, another former traditional comprehensive high school in Wilmington
