= Charter School of Wilmington =

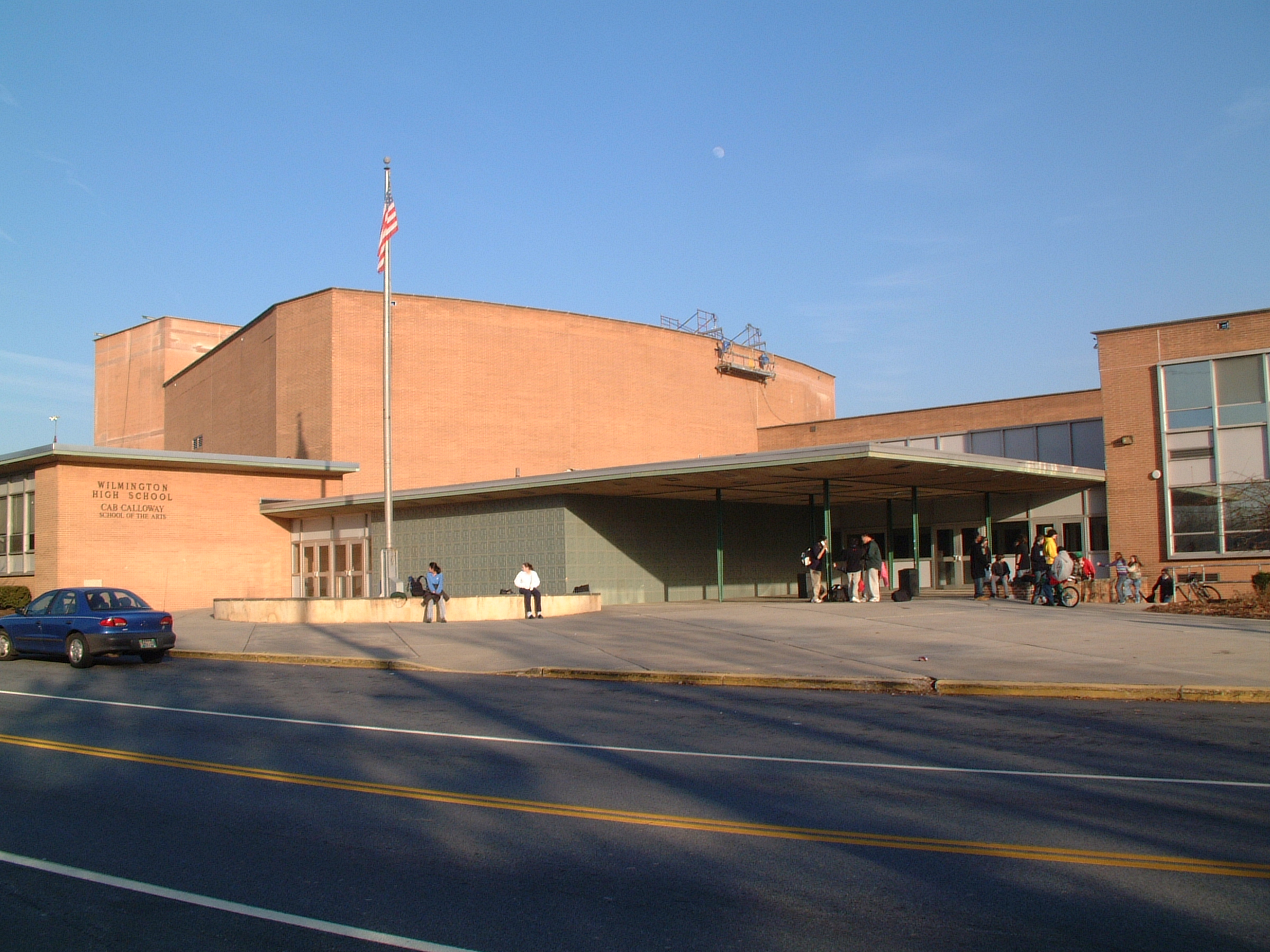

Location
- 100 N. DuPont Road; Wilmington, Delaware 19807; United States; 39°45′12″N 75°35′18″W

Information
- Type: Charter school
- Motto: Excellence Community Leadership
- Established: 1996 (30 years ago)
- School district: Red Clay Consolidated School District
- CEEB code: 080164
- NCES School ID: 100000400012
- President: Daniel Bartnik (2025–present)
- Grades: 9–12
- Enrollment: 970 (2024–2025)
- Capacity: 970
- Campus type: Hybrid
- Colors: Blue and white
- Athletics: Delaware Interscholastic Athletic Association
- Athletics conference: Diamond State Athletic Conference
- Mascot: The Force Calculators
- Nickname: The Force
- National ranking: 56 in national public schools 12 in national charter schools
- Newspaper: The Force File
- Website: charterschool.org

The Charter School of Wilmington (CSW) is a college preparatory charter high school in Wilmington, Delaware. It is Delaware's first independently operated public school whose curriculum emphasizes math and science. It shares the former Wilmington High School building with Cab Calloway School of the Arts.

== History ==
The Charter School of Wilmington was chartered by the Red Clay Consolidated School District to replace the Academy of Mathematics and Science magnet school and opened in 1996. CSW was the first school to be chartered in the state of Delaware. Today, the school is operated by a consortium of six companies: AstraZeneca, Verizon, Delmarva Power, DuPont, Hercules Incorporated, and Christiana Care Health System. It is a member of the National Consortium of Secondary STEM Schools, a group of around 100 high schools, as well as affiliates such as colleges and universities, summer programs, foundations, and corporations.

== Academics ==
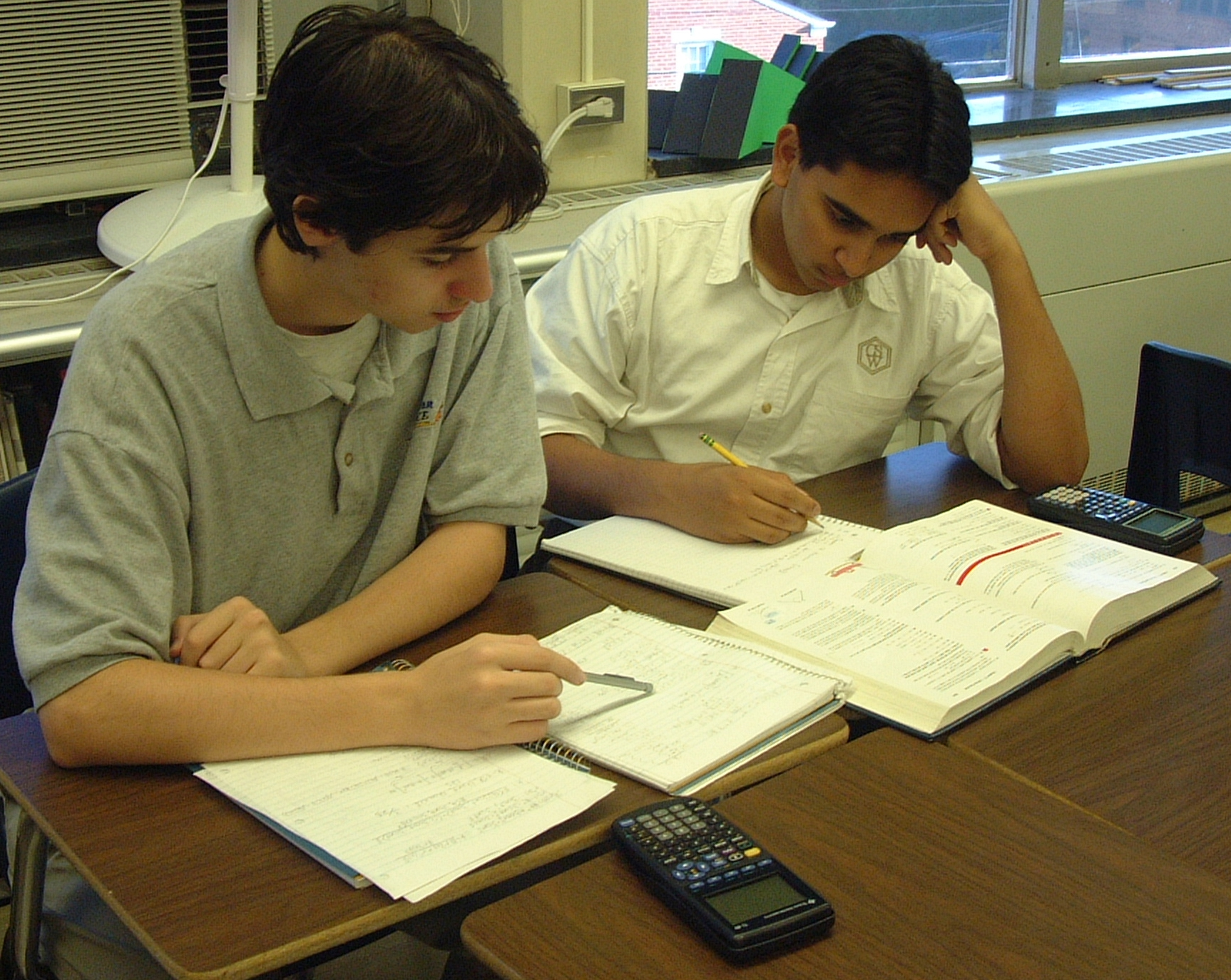
Students look over a UD MATH 243 problem after school.

In 2021,U.S. News & World Report ranked it #74 of nearly 18,000 high schools considered and Newsweek ranked it #94 of STEM schools nationwide. In 2013, CSW was given a Recognition School award from the Delaware Department of Education for exceptional performance and in 2013 and 2019, the US Department of Education named them a National Blue Ribbon School. In June 2014, CSW's Jefferson Awards Council was given the Outstanding Service for Jefferson Council Volunteer award. In early May 2025, it was announced that CSW had won the Samsung Solve for Tomorrow STEM competition, that came with a $100k prize.

Students also have the option of taking classes such as visual arts, drama, and music at Cab Calloway School of the Arts, who they share a building with. They also have the opportunity to dual enroll at the University of Delaware. During their sophomore and senior year, students must complete a research project for the science fair. Freshmen take Introduction to Scientific Research to prepare for this annual event. These research projects were chosen by sophomores prior to the 2023–2024 school year.

== Students ==
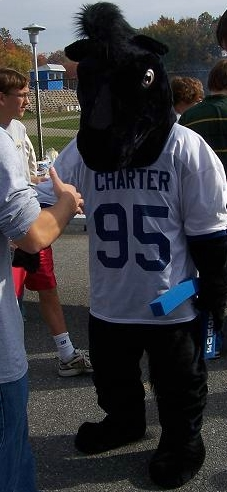
The Charter Charger, named Lightning and known colloquially as the "Force Horse"

=== Demographics ===
In 2020, White students made up most the student body, and about 30% of the students were Asian American. Fewer than 8% of the combined student bodies of this school and Cab Calloway School of the Arts reside in the City of Wilmington, and fewer than 3% are Wilmington residents who are black and/or Hispanic/Latino or multiracial. Barrish and Eichmann wrote that an Asian American suburban student living in an "affluent" area "is a fairly typical Charter of Wilmington student."

=== Extra-curriculars ===
Students may join concert band and marching band, which are associated with Cab Calloway School of the Arts. Conversely, students who attend the Cab Calloway school have the ability to participate on Charter sports teams in lieu of having their own teams. The Charter School of Wilmington also allows students to join numerous student-run clubs and club franchises, such as Mock Trial, Model UN, and Astronomy Club.

== The Force File ==
The school's newspaper, The Force File, is a digital-first newspaper owned and operated by CSW students.

== Administration ==
The Charter School of Wilmington welcomed a new president in 2025, Daniel Bartnik, who was previously the president of Newark Charter School.

== Potential relocation ==
In early March 2025, talks at the Red Clay Consolidated School District committee resulted proposals for a relocation of the school to alternative locations, such as the current campus of fellow Red Clay School Thomas McKean High School. These talks began as a result of dwindling enrollment in Red Clay Schools around Delaware. All three traditional public schools, A.I. Dupont, Dickinson, and McKean, were running at 46%, 88%, and 96% capacity, respectively, while Charter School of Wilmington's enrollment is consistently filled to the current max of 970 total students.

The talks concluded with twelve ideas that would potentially balance enrollment amongst the Red Clay Schools:

- Repurposing one of the high schools into a Vo-Tech/Innovation Center, bringing the district down to two traditional high schools.
- Creating the innovation center, but making it grades 6–12
- Moving Dickinson's middle school program to Skyline, increasing its high school capacity if it becomes one of the two high schools going forward
- Creating an online school for grades 6–12
- Moving Charter School of Wilmington to an existing high school (McKean), allowing for old Wilmington High School to be used as part of the Redding Consortium's new spread of city students
- Expanding Dickinson to a Grade 6-12 IB magnet program
- Merging A.I. duPont Middle School and A.I. duPont High School, similar to Delmar and Laurel downstate
- Consolidating one middle school, from grades 8–7
- Making a Warner/Shortlidge Community School from grades K-8
- Making a Warner Community School from grades K-12, effectively putting an 8th high school under the umbrella of Red Clay
- Capping the Conrad and Cab magnet schools to lower enrollments
- Choice busing for all students

The act of moving the CSW to the current McKean building would allow for the school to have total control of their facilities, unlike the current rental agreement that Charter is currently under within their current building.

== Media appearances ==
The Charter School of Wilmington's founder and former St. Marks School principal, Ronald Russo, was featured on TruTV's The Principal's Office.

== Notable alumni ==
- Andrew Gemmell, swimmer in the 2012 Summer Olympics
- Kieran Tuntivate, 2019 Southeast Asian Games record-holding distance runner who qualified for the 2020 Summer Olympics, rescheduled for 2021
- Madinah Wilson-Anton, politician in the Delaware House of Representatives

== Notable faculty and staff ==
- Chris Eddy (athletic director, 2009—present), former MLB pitcher (April 26, 1995 – May 12, 1995; 17 days) - ERA: 7.36, 2 strikeouts
