= Brian J. Aungst, Sr. =

American politician

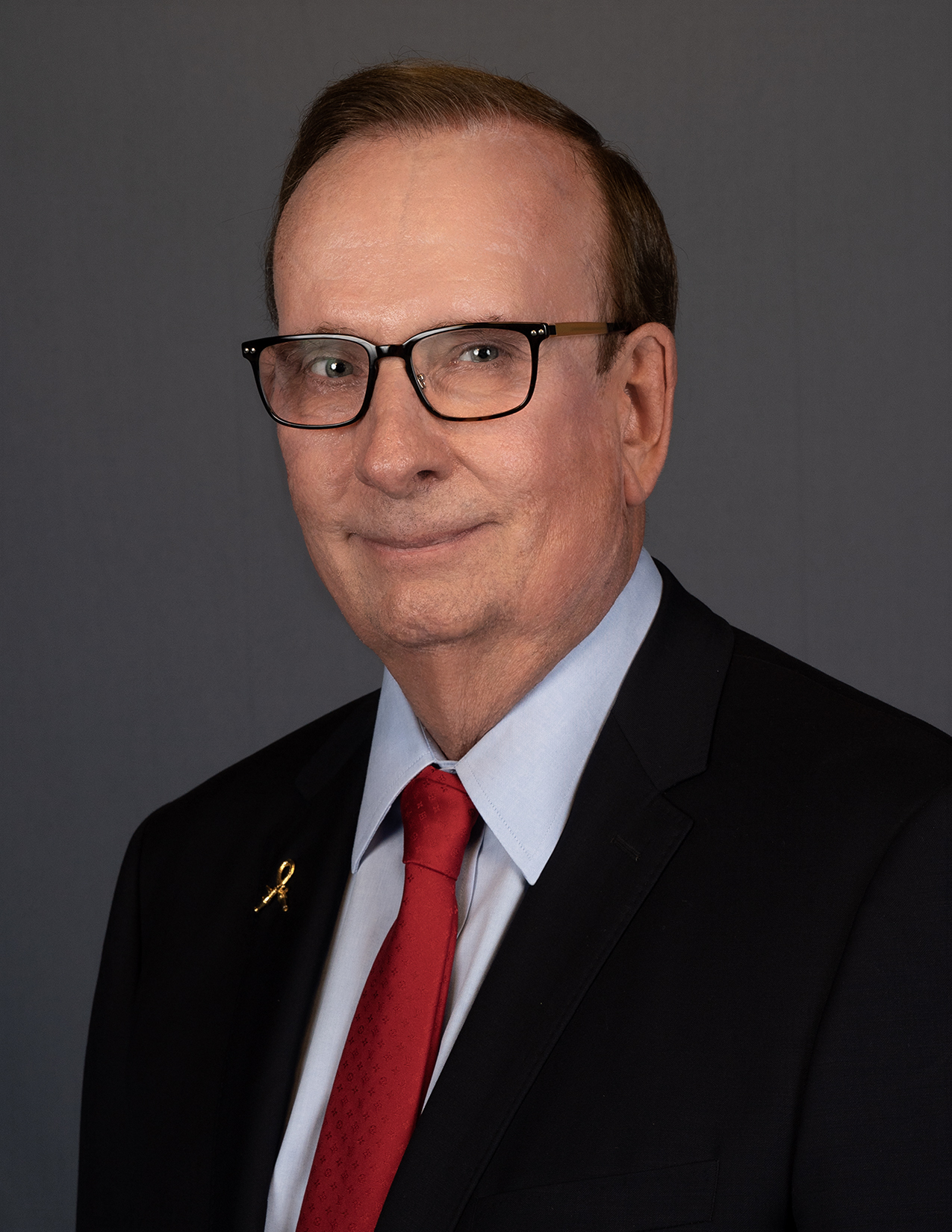

Mayor of Clearwater, Florida
- In office April 11, 2023 – April 1, 2024
- Preceded by: Frank Hibbard
- Succeeded by: Bruce Rector

Mayor of Clearwater, Florida
- In office 1999–2005
- Preceded by: Rita Garvey
- Succeeded by: Frank Hibbard

Personal details
- Born: January 22, 1954 (age 71) Annville, Pennsylvania, U.S.
- Political party: Republican
- Education: Wilmington University (BS), (MBA)
- Website: City of Clearwater website

Brian J. Aungst Sr. (born January 22, 1954) is a Florida politician and retired communications executive who serves as mayor of Clearwater, the second-largest city in Pinellas County on Florida’s west coast and the 18th largest in Florida. Aungst has held the office since April 2023 and previously served as Clearwater mayor from 1999 to 2005. His tenures have been marked by a focus on economic development and civic engagement.

== First tenure as mayor ==
While Aungst was mayor the first time, Clearwater completed a new bridge and causeway linking its mainland and beach communities, opened a new spring training stadium for the Philadelphia Phillies, constructed a new main library, and established new recreation centers.

In his capacity as mayor, Aungst participated in regional advisory roles, such as the Pinellas County Tourist Development Council. His efforts were directed toward stimulating tourism, particularly following the September 11, 2001 terrorist attacks. During Aungst’s tenure from 1999–2005, economic development in the city totaled $750 million.

The 1960s-era drawbridge that connected the city’s mainland and beach communities needed to be replaced while Aungst was mayor. As mayor, Aungst built support for replacing the old Clearwater Memorial Causeway bridge with a new, fixed bridge.

From its start in 2002, the project experienced engineering and construction issues, including cracked pilings and shifting sections of roadway, resulting in a series of delays. Aungst worked with the city, state transportation staff, and the project’s contractor and subcontractors to get the project completed. The new bridge carried its first cars over Clearwater Harbor in August 2005, with ceremonies to mark the milestone that included a running race across the new span. The Boston Society of Architects included the bridge’s design among the organization’s seven “Landmark American Bridges of the 21st Century.”

Aungst established a public-private partnership that led to the construction of the Community Sports Complex, now known as BayCare Ballpark. This facility served as the spring training base for the Philadelphia Phillies and the home of the Clearwater Threshers, a minor league baseball team, in addition to hosting various community events.

Aungst also was mayor during the construction of a 90,000-square-foot public library in downtown Clearwater. This four-story facility also included a children’s area, coffee shop, and gift shop.

While Aungst was mayor, Clearwater developed multiple recreation centers and athletic complexes. Clearwater was named "Sports Town USA" in Florida, as acknowledged by Sports Illustrated magazine.

Aungst was the first mayor of Clearwater to be re-elected unopposed in more than 40 years; he left the position after completing his second term in 2005 due to term limits.

== Second tenure as mayor ==
In March 2023, Clearwater Mayor Frank Hibbard resigned, citing disagreements with other members of the city’s leadership over financial decisions. Clearwater’s City Council unanimously appointed Aungst to serve out the remaining 11 months of Hibbard’s term. Aungst was sworn in on April 11, 2023, telling the assembled audience, “I didn’t run for office. I didn’t make any campaign promises. I didn’t take any campaign contributions. I don’t owe anybody anything but good government and doing the best job that I can to my ability. And that’s what I intend to do.”

== Professional and community involvement ==
For 30 years, Aungst served as director of state government affairs for Charter Communications, through various corporate ownership groups and name changes. In that time, he was recognized with 20 CableACE awards, 10 Beacon awards, and the Don Reed award from Florida Internet & Television, formerly the Florida Cable Telecommunications Association, an organization for which Aungst previously served as chair.

AMPLIFY Clearwater, formerly the Clearwater Regional Chamber of Commerce, awarded the organization’s top honor—Mr. and Mrs. Clearwater—to Aungst and his late wife, Karen, in 2017.

Several organizations serving youth and community causes have recognized Aungst with honors, including the Abilities Foundation Corporate Citizen of the Year, the Phillies All Star in the Community award, Tourism Person of the Year from both the Greater Clearwater Regional Chamber and the Tampa Bay Beaches Chamber of Commerce, Mr. Countryside, and the Frederick E. Fisher Humanitarian award from Clearwater for Youth—now CFY Pinellas—for his commitment to supporting youth activities.
