= Alexis I. duPont High School =

Location
- 50 Hillside Road; Wilmington, Delaware 19807; United States; 39°46′39″N 75°36′05″W

Information
- Type: Public
- Motto: Stand Upright and Endure
- Established: January 19th, 1894 (132 years ago)
- Founders: Francis G. duPont; John Conly; B. Frank Sheppard
- School district: Red Clay Consolidated School District; Alexis I. duPont Special School District (1919-1978); United School Districts Nos. 23 & 75 (1894-1919)
- CEEB code: 080155
- Principal: Martin Cresci
- Faculty: 52 (FTE) (2019-2020)
- Grades: 9–12
- Enrollment: 605 (2023-2024)
- Colors: Royal blue and gold
- Athletics: Tigers
- Athletics conference: Blue Hen Conference - Flight B
- Mascot: Bengal Tiger
- Rival: Charter School of Wilmington
- Yearbook: The Alexis
- Website: www.redclayschools.com/aihs

Alexis I. duPont High School (A.I.) is a public high school located in Greenville, Delaware, with a Wilmington postal address, is one of the three public high schools offering grades 9–12 in the Red Clay Consolidated School District. During the 2019–2020 school year 807 students were enrolled. Areas zoned to AI come from portions of Wilmington and several suburbs, including Greenville, most of Hockessin, a portion of North Star, and Centreville, as well as nearby Breck's Mill. In Wilmington, it serves the historic districts of Cool Spring Park, Delaware Avenue, and Wawaset Park.

In 2020, the high school was the site of the first campaign event featuring Democratic presidential nominee Joe Biden and his running mate Kamala Harris.

== History ==
Its namesake was Alexis I. duPont. The same man was the namesake of Alexis I. duPont Middle School, which evolved from the high school.

It originated from the "yellow school house" first established in 1832 and expanded in 1857, the latter assisted by the namesake.

Founded in 1893 under Principal A.R. Spade, Alexis I. duPont High School (AI) was originally a part of the Alexis I. duPont School District. AI moved to its current location in 1966 from where Alexis I. duPont Middle School stands today. Both schools left the AI School District in 1978 and were moved into the short-lived New Castle County School District, which split into the Red Clay Consolidated, Brandywine, Christiana, and Colonial school districts in August 1981.

There were 1,480 students in the 2009-2010 school year. Enrollment was over 1,000 in the 2016-2016 school year. On September 30, 2023, it had 605 students, resulting in it having the smallest enrollment of a public high school in Delaware. It had a significant enrollment decline while the other two traditional public high schools in the district did not experience this.

== Academics ==
In 2021, U.S. News & World Report ranked AI #9,632 of more than 18,000 high schools nationally and Niche ranked it #1 of 56 schools in the state of Delaware.

AI's graduation rate for the 2018–2019 academic year was 88%.

== Athletics ==
AI is a member of the Delaware Interscholastic Athletic Association (DIAA) and as of 2017 participates in Flight B of the Blue Hen Conference. Sports played within the DIAA league are: football, cross country, field hockey, soccer, volleyball, basketball, swimming, wrestling, baseball, golf, lacrosse, softball, tennis, and track & field. The ice hockey team is a Division I school within the Delaware Scholastic Hockey Association, which is hosted at the Patriot Ice Center in Newark.

== Student activities ==
=== Music ===
They have marched in the inaugural parades for Jimmy Carter, George H. W. Bush, and Barack Obama. They appeared in Pasadena's Tournament of Roses Parade in 1990, 1995, 1999, 2004, and 2008 and are one of three bands outside of California to take part five times. Other notable appearances include: the Orange Bowl (1997, 2000) and Fiesta Bowl (2006, 2010); the St. Patrick's Day Parade in Dublin, Ireland (1993, 1997, 2000, and 2003); the 2002 Queen's Golden Jubilee; New Year's Day parades in London (1989, 1992, 1996, 2005, 2009, 2012, and 2017) and the New Year's Parade at St. Peter's Square in the Vatican City (2007, 2012, and 2015).

The Tiger Marching Band has attended the 6abc Dunkin' Donuts Thanksgiving Day Parade in Philadelphia since at least 1979, the Macy's Thanksgiving parade in New York City and the Latin American and Christmas Parades in Wilmington for many years.

Vocal music at A.I. consists of several different ensembles, including a concert and a chamber choir, designed to meet the variety of needs, talents, and interests of high school vocalists.

The band is a student-run organization in which students, specifically an executive board of seniors, make nearly all of the governing decisions. Paul L. Parets, who had been the high school's band director since 1976, retired in the spring of 2012. The band has since been directed by Richard F. Weaver III, who is a 1998 AI alumnus and joined the faculty in 2003.

== Notable alumni ==
- Rod Beaton (1951–2011), sports journalist for USA Today
- Jim Bundren (born 1974), former NFL player for the Cleveland Browns
- Mangesh Hattikudur (born abt 1975), co-founder of Mental Floss magazine
- Archie Hahn III (born 1941), actor
- Quadree Henderson (born 1996), football player in the Canadian Football League
- Henry Milligan (born 1958), professional boxer
- Jamie Natalie (born 1979), retired gymnast; alternate to the 2000 U.S. Men's Olympic gymnastics team
- Jeremy O'Keefe (born 1980), filmmaker
- Judge Reinhold (born 1957), actor
- Elissa Schappell (born abt 1963), novelist, editor, essayist, and co-founder and editor of Tin House
- Leo E. Strine, Jr. (born 1964), former judge and Chief Justice of the Delaware Supreme Court
- Shirley Bulah, elementary school student whose mom became plaintiff in the successful Delaware desegregation case Bulah v. Gebhart
