= Elsmere, Delaware =

- Town
- Town of Elsmere
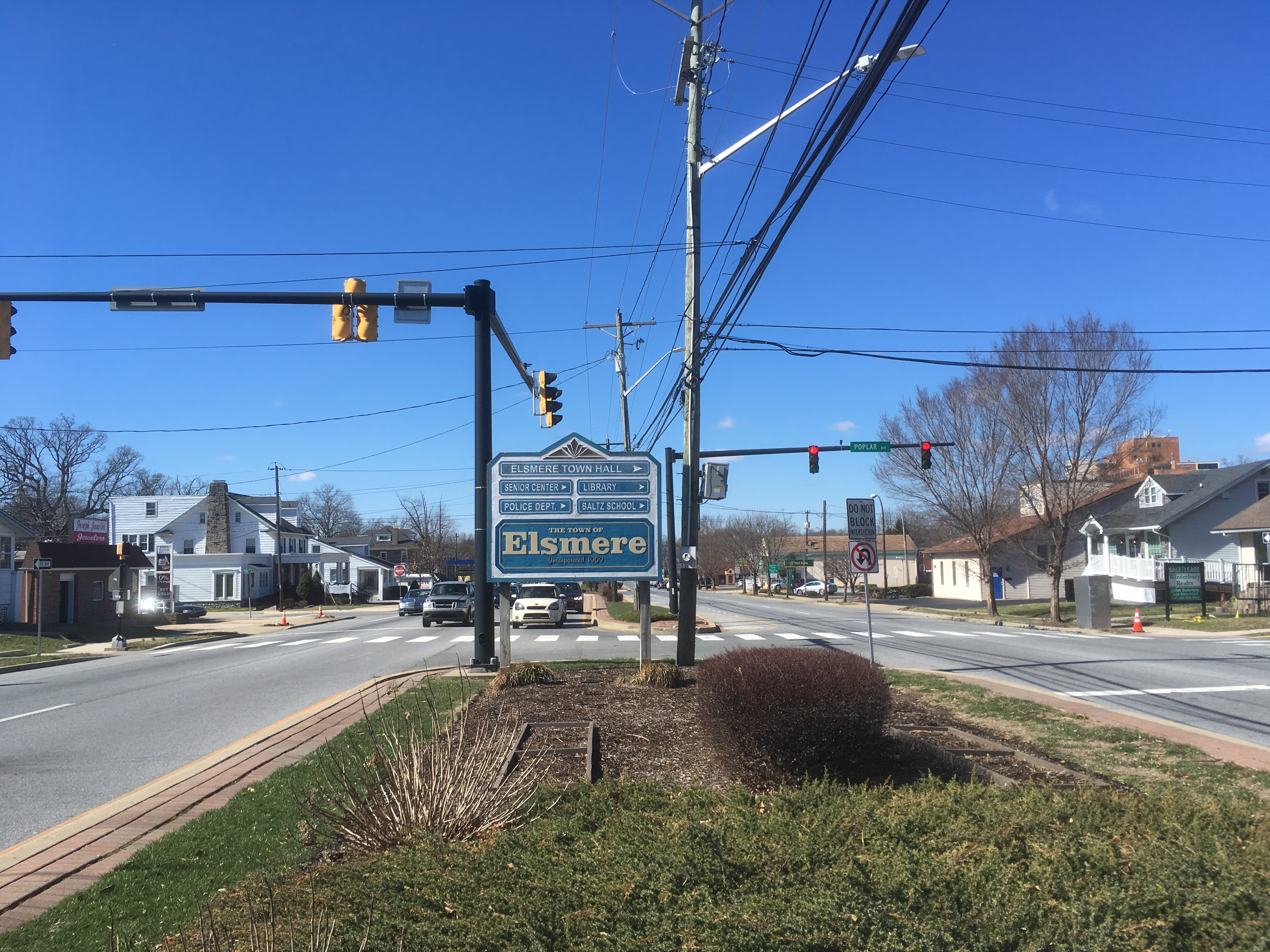
- Kirkwood Highway in Elsmere

- Seal

- Location of Elsmere in New Castle County, Delaware.

- Location within the state of Delaware Elsmere (the United States)
- Coordinates: 39°44′21″N 75°35′53″W
- Country: United States
- State: Delaware
- County: New Castle
- Incorporated: 1909

Government
  - Type: Mayor-council
  - Mayor: Joann Personti

Area
  - Total: 0.99 sq mi (2.56 km^{2})
  - Land: 0.99 sq mi (2.56 km^{2})
  - Water: 0 sq mi (0.00 km^{2})
- Elevation: 98 ft (30 m)

Population (2020)
  - Total: 6,229
  - Density: 6,313.7/sq mi (2,437.75/km^{2})
- Time zone: UTC−5 (Eastern (EST))
  - Summer (DST): UTC−4 (EDT)
- ZIP codes: 19805, 19804
- Area code: 302
- FIPS code: 10-24540
- GNIS feature ID: 213941
- Website: www.townofelsmere.com

Elsmere is a town in New Castle County, Delaware, United States, bordering the city of Wilmington along Wilmington's western border. As of the 2020 census, Elsmere had a population of 6,229.

== History ==
Elsmere dates back to 1886 when real estate developer Joshua Heald bought farmland and converted it into houses, building the first suburb in northern Delaware. The community was built at an intersection of railroad lines and allowed working-class families easy access to Wilmington. Trolley lines were later built leading to Elsmere. In 1909, Elsmere was incorporated as a town.

During the 1910s, the Delaware State Fair Association purchased land and built a new fairgrounds within Elsmere's town limit. The grounds, including a racecourse for horses, cars and motorcycles, were located south of New Road and Wilmington Avenue and west of the previously established streets. This land became the site of the Delaware State Fair from 1917 to 1928, and provided a large parking area and ready access from the nearby trolley line. Agricultural exhibits provided the backbone of the fair, but in addition to the races, the summer attraction also included horse and dog shows, vaudeville acts, music, and fireworks. After 1928, the State Fair had moved to Harrington, but the grandstand and the races remained until 1943, when the property was converted to land for residential housing.

In 1950, a 336-bed Veteran's Administration hospital opened on the western edge of town. This was the ninth VA hospital built after the conclusion of World War II.

== Geography ==
Elsmere is located at 39°44′21″N 75°35′53″W (39.7392796, –75.5979812).

According to the United States Census Bureau, the town has a total area of 1.0 square mile (2.6 km^{2}), all land. Elsmere is 1.5 miles away from Wilmington

=== Climate ===
The climate in this area is characterized by hot, humid summers and generally mild to cool winters. According to the Köppen Climate Classification system, Elsmere has a humid subtropical climate, abbreviated "Cfa" on climate maps.

Climate data for Elsmere, Delaware
| Month | Jan | Feb | Mar | Apr | May | Jun | Jul | Aug | Sep | Oct | Nov | Dec | Year |
|---|---|---|---|---|---|---|---|---|---|---|---|---|---|
| Record high °F (°C) | 74 (23) | 74 (23) | 87 (31) | 94 (34) | 94 (34) | 98 (37) | 101 (38) | 100 (38) | 97 (36) | 89 (32) | 84 (29) | 73 (23) | 101 (38) |
| Mean daily maximum °F (°C) | 39 (4) | 42 (6) | 51 (11) | 62 (17) | 72 (22) | 81 (27) | 85 (29) | 83 (28) | 76 (24) | 64 (18) | 54 (12) | 43 (6) | 63 (17) |
| Mean daily minimum °F (°C) | 25 (−4) | 27 (−3) | 34 (1) | 43 (6) | 53 (12) | 63 (17) | 68 (20) | 66 (19) | 59 (15) | 47 (8) | 39 (4) | 29 (−2) | 46 (8) |
| Record low °F (°C) | −9 (−23) | −5 (−21) | 5 (−15) | 19 (−7) | 29 (−2) | 41 (5) | 51 (11) | 43 (6) | 35 (2) | 24 (−4) | 14 (−10) | −1 (−18) | −9 (−23) |
| Average precipitation inches (mm) | 3.71 (94) | 3.10 (79) | 4.52 (115) | 4.21 (107) | 4.38 (111) | 4.19 (106) | 5.36 (136) | 3.67 (93) | 4.90 (124) | 3.81 (97) | 3.48 (88) | 4.10 (104) | 49.43 (1,254) |
Source: The Weather Channel

== Demographics ==
Historical population
| Census | Pop. | Note | %± |
|---|---|---|---|
| 1910 | 374 | | — |
| 1920 | 620 | | 65.8% |
| 1930 | 1,323 | | 113.4% |
| 1940 | 1,630 | | 23.2% |
| 1950 | 5,314 | | 226.0% |
| 1960 | 7,319 | | 37.7% |
| 1970 | 8,415 | | 15.0% |
| 1980 | 6,493 | | −22.8% |
| 1990 | 5,935 | | −8.6% |
| 2000 | 5,800 | | −2.3% |
| 2010 | 6,131 | | 5.7% |
| 2020 | 6,229 | | 1.6% |
U.S. Decennial Census

=== 2020 census ===
As of the 2020 census, Elsmere had a population of 6,229. The median age was 36.1 years. 23.6% of residents were under the age of 18 and 12.9% of residents were 65 years of age or older. For every 100 females there were 90.1 males, and for every 100 females age 18 and over there were 85.6 males age 18 and over.

100.0% of residents lived in urban areas, while 0.0% lived in rural areas.

There were 2,537 households in Elsmere, of which 35.1% had children under the age of 18 living in them. Of all households, 30.9% were married-couple households, 22.0% were households with a male householder and no spouse or partner present, and 38.8% were households with a female householder and no spouse or partner present. About 33.0% of all households were made up of individuals and 11.4% had someone living alone who was 65 years of age or older.

There were 2,679 housing units, of which 5.3% were vacant. The homeowner vacancy rate was 1.2% and the rental vacancy rate was 5.7%.

Racial composition as of the 2020 census
| Race | Number | Percent |
|---|---|---|
| White | 3,238 | 52.0% |
| Black or African American | 1,185 | 19.0% |
| American Indian and Alaska Native | 66 | 1.1% |
| Asian | 113 | 1.8% |
| Native Hawaiian and Other Pacific Islander | 2 | 0.0% |
| Some other race | 949 | 15.2% |
| Two or more races | 676 | 10.9% |
| Hispanic or Latino (of any race) | 1,828 | 29.3% |

=== 2000 census ===
As of the 2000 census, there were 5,800 people, 2,299 households, and 1,487 families residing in the town. The population density was 5,891.0 inhabitants per square mile (2,274.5/km^{2}). There were 2,395 housing units at an average density of 2,432.6 per square mile (939.2/km^{2}). The racial makeup of the town was 82.41% White, 9.45% African American, 0.22% Native American, 0.97% Asian, 5.10% from other races, and 1.84% from two or more races. Hispanic or Latino of any race were 12.09% of the population.

There were 2,299 households, out of which 31.2% had children under the age of 18 living with them, 42.5% were married couples living together, 16.4% had a female householder with no husband present, and 35.3% were non-families. 28.5% of all households were made up of individuals, and 11.5% had someone living alone who was 65 years of age or older. The average household size was 2.52 and the average family size was 3.09.

In the town, the population was spread out, with 25.1% under the age of 18, 9.5% from 18 to 24, 31.1% from 25 to 44, 19.7% from 45 to 64, and 14.7% who were 65 years of age or older. The median age was 36 years. For every 100 females, there were 96.0 males. For every 100 females age 18 and over, there were 91.8 males.

The median income for a household in the town was $39,415, and the median income for a family was $46,357. Males had a median income of $35,427 versus $28,089 for females. The per capita income for the town was $18,643. About 6.7% of families and 8.9% of the population were below the poverty line, including 11.8% of those under age 18 and 8.6% of those age 65 or over.

== Government ==
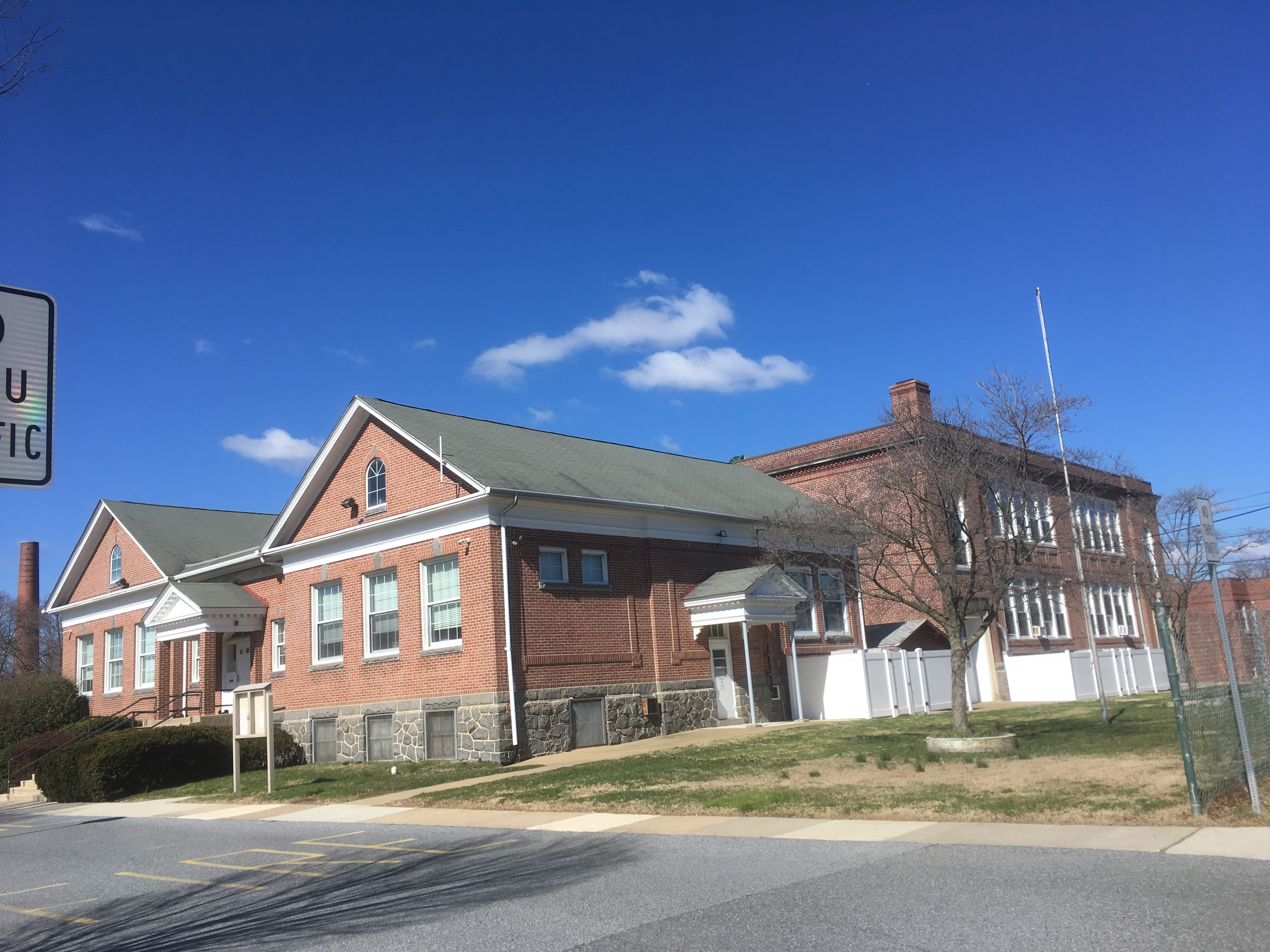
Town hall and police station in Elsmere

Elsmere has a mayor-council system of government consisting of a Mayor and a six-member Town Council, with Town Council members elected by district. As of 2026, the Mayor is Joann Personti while the Town Council consists of Jane McDaniel (1st District), Sally Jensen (2nd District), Brian Reinbold Jr (3rd District), John Holloway (4th District), Marc Henry (5th District), and Erik Ellison (6th District).

Police services in the town is provided by the Elsmere Police Department, which consists of a Chief of Police, Administrative Assistant, Lieutenant, two Patrol Sergeants, Sr. CPL, CPL, two PFCs, and three Patrolmen. Fire protection in the town is provided by the Elsmere Fire Company No. 1, which was founded in 1921.

=== Mayors ===
- Joann Personti 2025–Present
- Eric Thompson 2018–2025
- Steven Burg 2015–2018
- Deborah Norkavage 2007–2015
- Richard Herold 2001-2007
- Edward Doyle 1999-2001
- Charles Cavnaugh 1990-1999
- And Patti Belvins 1985–1990
- And James Abbott 1979-1985
- And Joseph Walling 1957–1971
- John Jaremchuk 1977-1979
- Richard Holmes 1954–1957

== Parks and recreation ==
Elsmere is home to multiple small neighborhood parks. Parks in Elsmere include Junction Street Park, Fairgrounds Park, Joseph R. Walling Park, Maple Avenue Park, Brian Martin Park, Vilone Park, and Veterans Park. The town is also home to Elsmere Bark Park, which is a dog park.

== Education ==
The town of Elsmere is served by the Red Clay Consolidated School District for public education. The school district maintains one school in the town: Austin D. Baltz Elementary School (Grades K through 5). Public school students in Elsmere in grades 6 through 8 attend Alexis I. duPont Middle School in Greenville while students in grades 9 through 12 attend Thomas McKean High School northwest of Elsmere near Hockessin.

The Diocese of Wilmington operates All Saints Catholic School (PreK through 8). Formally known as Corpus Christi School, All Saints is a merge of Corpus Christi, St. Matthew School, St. Catherine of Siena, and Our Lady of Fatima.

New Caste County Libraries maintains the Elsmere Library.

Previously Elsmere was in the Conrad Area School District.

== Infrastructure ==
=== Transportation ===
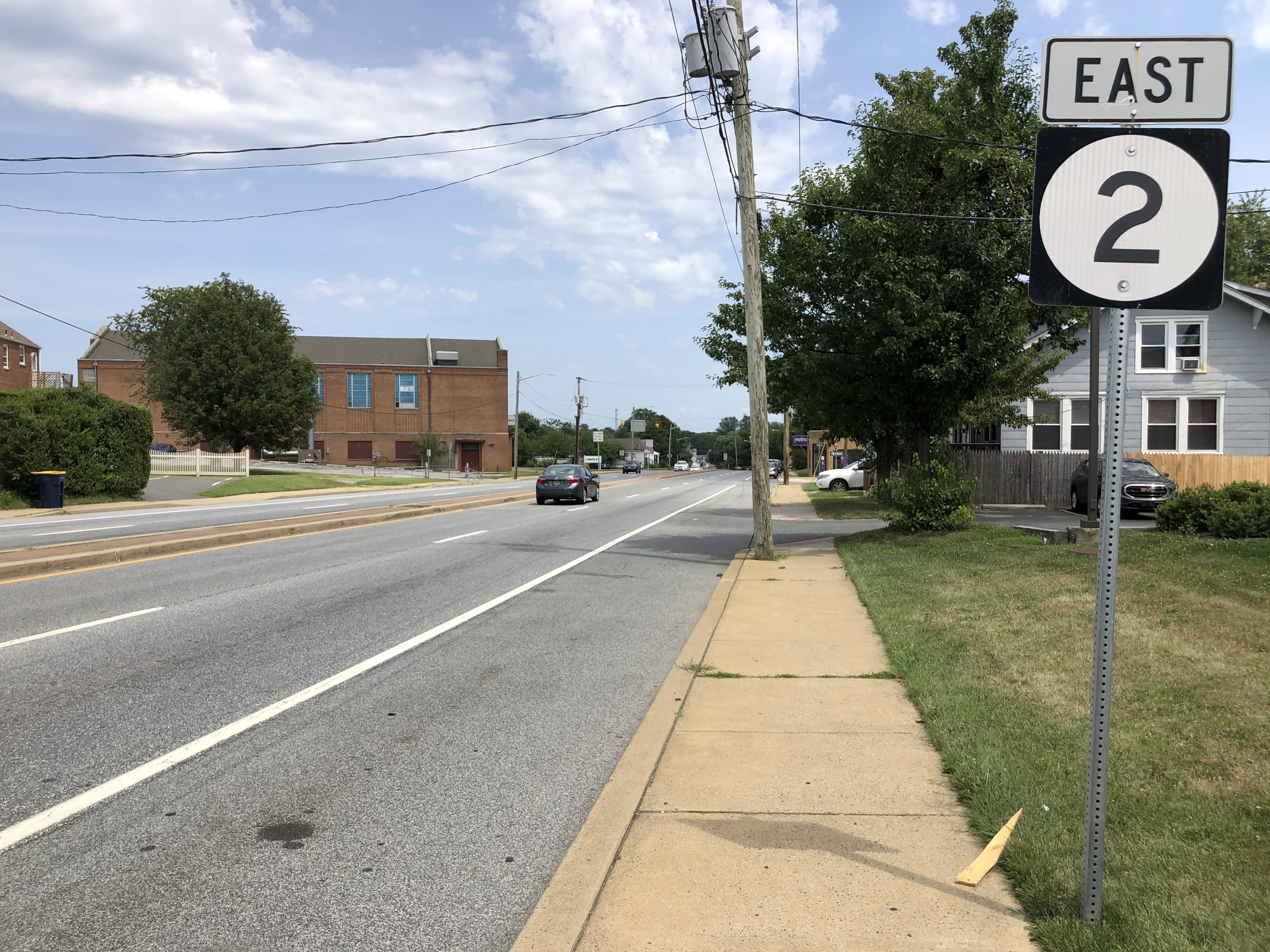
DE 2 eastbound in Elsmere

The main east–west road in Elsmere is Delaware Route 2 (Kirkwood Highway), which heads east to Wilmington and west to Newark. Delaware Route 100 (Dupont Road) runs north–south through the eastern part of Elsmere. Delaware Route 141 passes to the west of Elsmere, with access to the town via an interchange with DE 2 in Prices Corner. DE 141 heads south through Newport and provides access to Interstate 95, Interstate 295, and Interstate 495. DART First State provides bus service to Elsmere along Route 6, which follows Kirkwood Highway and heads east to Wilmington station, which is served by Amtrak and SEPTA Regional Rail's Wilmington/Newark Line, and west to the Newark Transit Hub. Freight trains pass through Elsmere along CSX Transportation's Philadelphia Subdivision line and East Penn Railroad's Wilmington & Northern line, both of which interchange at Elsmere Junction. CSX Transportation operates the Wilsmere Yard to the south of Elsmere near the former Wilmington Assembly plant used by General Motors.

=== Utilities ===
Delmarva Power, a subsidiary of Exelon, provides electricity and natural gas to Elsmere. Artesian Water Company, a subsidiary of Artesian Resources, provides water to Elsmere. Sewer service in Elsmere is provided by New Castle County. Trash and recycling collection in Elsmere is provided under contract by Waste Management.

=== Health care ===
Elsmere is home to the Wilmington VA Medical Center, a veterans hospital operated by the Veterans Health Administration. Hospitals near Elsmere include Wilmington Hospital and St. Francis Hospital in Wilmington and Christiana Hospital in Christiana.

== Notable people ==
- Bill Hawke, former MLB pitcher for the St. Louis Cardinals and Baltimore Orioles
- Francis D. Vavala, General, Delaware National Guard
- Patricia Blevins, Former mayor of Elsmere and President pro tempore of the Delaware Senate
