= Campus Community School =

Public charter school in Dover, Delaware, US

Coordinates: 39°9′42.12″N 75°31′37.69″W

Information
- Established: 1998; 28 years ago
- Grades: Kindergarten - Grade 8
- Capacity: 412

Campus Community School is a tuition free, public charter school located at 350 Pear Street in Dover, Delaware, in the United States.

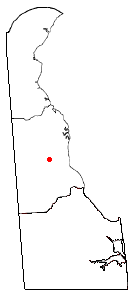
Map of Delaware, showing the position of Dover

== History ==
Campus Community School was founded and opened in 1998 on the campus of Wesley College, with 300 students in grades 1–8. In 2002, with the acquisition of a facility on Pear St. and a charter modification, the high school was added with 300 additional students. With the loss of the Wesley College facility in 2011, the charter was amended to close the high school program and add a kindergarten. In the spring of 2013 the final class of seniors graduated. Currently Campus Community School is chartered for 412 students in a K-8 school program.
