= André Harvey (sculptor) =

American sculptor

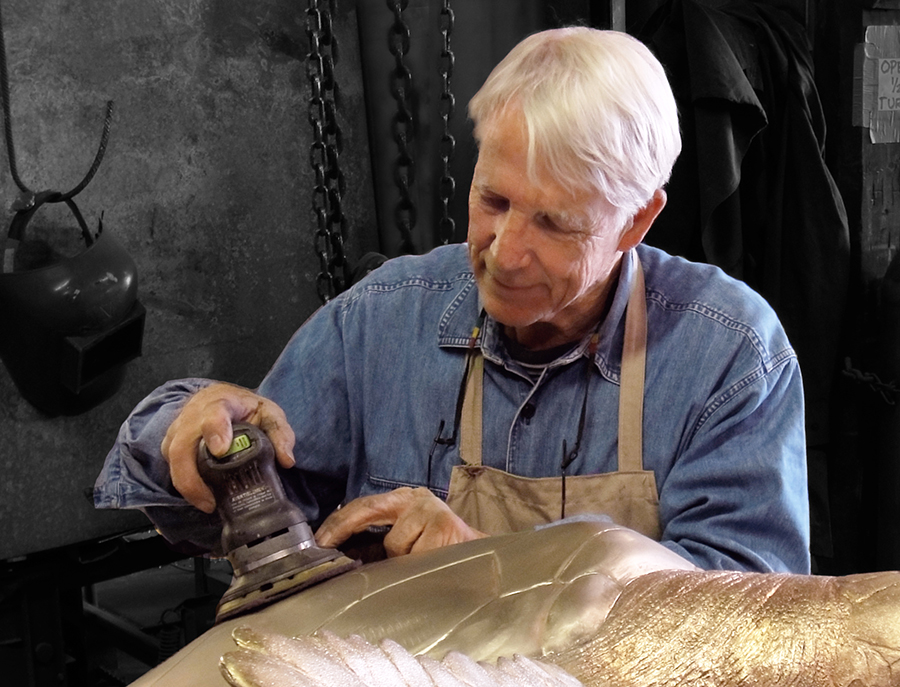
- Sculptor André Harvey working on "Mysterious Journey" (bronze sea turtle) in 2010 at the Laran Bronze foundry in Chester, Pennsylvania.
- Born: October 9, 1941; Hollywood, Florida, U.S.
- Died: February 6, 2018 (aged 76); Wilmington, Delaware, U.S.
- Education: University of Virginia
- Known for: Sculpture, Bronze, Stone, Jewelry
- Elected: National Sculpture Society

William André Harvey (October 9, 1941 – February 6, 2018) was an American sculptor whose realistic and contemporary works are primarily cast in bronze using lost-wax casting. Harvey also worked in granite, collage, painting, and produced intricate sculptural jewelry cast in gold. He worked in the Brandywine Valley, in Rockland near Wilmington, Delaware.

== Biography ==
Harvey's sculpture "Mysterious Journey" (2010), photographed in 2024 inside the Delaware Museum of Nature & Science.

Harvey was born in Hollywood, Florida and raised in Pocopson, Pennsylvania. He earned a bachelor's degree in English from the University of Virginia in 1963. In 1969, after working both as a journalist and an educator, he and his wife, Bobbie quit their jobs in search of a life change and traveled through Europe and Morocco. During this period, Harvey met and worked with abstract sculptor Michel Anasse, in Vallauris, France, which resulted in his focus on sculpture as a career.

Once back in the US, Harvey began creating small and large-scale realistic sculptures inspired by his childhood growing up in rural Pocopson, near Chadds Ford, Pennsylvania. Harvey's first high-profile exposure was the exhibition of five sculptures for the five windows at Tiffany & Company, New York. Since that time, in a career spanning over four decades, Harvey has produced an extensive volume of work which has been purchased by numerous public and private collections, and has been featured in exhibitions both nationally and internationally.

He was a Fellow and former board member of the National Sculpture Society, New York. Harvey received the National Sculpture Society's Joel Meissner Award and the Tallix Foundry Award.

On June 15 and 16, 2017, the Hagley Museum and Library produced a two part oral history, Interview with André and Bobbie Harvey.

== Public outdoor sculptures ==
- Botanic Garden Center and Conservatory, Fort Worth, TX
- The Frederik Meijer Gardens, Grand Rapids, MI
- Winterthur Museum, Gardens and Library, Winterthur, DE
- Port Charlotte Town Center, Port Charlotte, FL
- Mt. Cuba Center, Hockessin, DE
- Brandywine River Museum of Art, Chadds Ford, PA
- Crystal Bridges Museum of American Art, Bentonville, AR
- University of Delaware, Newark, DE
- Longwood Gardens, Kennett Square, PA
- Hagley Museum and Library, Wilmington, DE
- Brookgreen Gardens, Murrells Inlet, SC
