= Delmarva Christian High School =

High school in Delaware, United States

Coordinates: 38°41′50″N 75°22′05″W

- Georgetown, Sussex County, Delaware; United States

Information
- Religious affiliation: Christianity
- Established: 1999; 27 years ago
- Website: https://www.delmarvachristian.org/academics/high-school

Delmarva Christian High School is a private Christian high school located in Georgetown, Delaware, the geographic center, and county seat of Sussex County.

== Background ==
In April 1999 a group of Sussex County educators, businesspeople, pastors, and parents came together to form Delmarva Christian Schools, Inc., to address the issue of high school education for Christian high school students. Delmarva is not a charter school, but privately funded.
