= Red Clay Consolidated School District =

School district in Delaware, United States

Red Clay Consolidated School District (abbreviated Red Clay or RCCSD) is a public school district in northern New Castle County, Delaware. Founded in 1981, Red Clay serves a portion of the city of Wilmington, as well as its northwestern suburbs.

Its service area includes Elsmere, Greenville, Hockessin, Newport, northwestern Wilmington, most of Pike Creek, most of Pike Creek Valley, and half of North Star.

Its headquarters are in the Austin D. Baltz Elementary School, which lies partially in Elsmere and an unincorporated area; it has a Wilmington postal address.

== History ==
The school district was established on July 1, 1981 in conjunction with the state of Delaware modifying its school districts, . It took a portion of the former New Castle County School District.

It was originally known as Interim District II.

== Schools ==
6-12 schools

- Cab Calloway School of the Arts (Wilmington)
- Conrad Schools of Science (unincorporated area)
- John Dickinson High School (unincorporated area)
  - JDHS 6-8 only being for students in the International Baccalaureate (IB) Program

High schools (9-12)

- Alexis I. duPont High School (Greenville, unincorporated area)
- Thomas McKean High School (unincorporated area)

High Schools Chartered by Red Clay District

- Charter School of Wilmington
- Delaware Military Academy

Middle schools

- Alexis I. duPont Middle School (unincorporated area)
- Henry B. duPont Middle School (Hockessin)
- Skyline Middle School (Pike Creek Valley, unincorporated area)
- Stanton Middle School (unincorporated area)

Elementary schools

- Anna P. Mote Elementary School (K-5)
- Austin D. Baltz Elementary School (K-5)
- Brandywine Springs School (K-8)
- Evan G. Shortlidge Academy (K-2)
- Forest Oak Elementary School (K-5)
- Heritage Elementary School (K-5)
- Linden Hill Elementary School (K-5)
- Marbrook Elementary School (K-5)
- North Star Elementary School (K-5)
- Richardson Park Elementary School (K-5)
- Donald J. Richey Elementary School (K-5)
- Warner Elementary School (3-5)
- William C. Lewis Dual Language Elementary School (K-5)
- William Cooke, Jr. Elementary School (K-5)

Pre-elementary schools

- Red Clay Early Years Program (ages 3–4)

Special schools

- First State School (for students grades 2–12 with medical needs)
- James H. Groves Adult High School (night classes for adult learners)
- Meadowood Program (transition program for students ages 3–21)

=== Former schools ===
- Wilmington High School
- Charles B. Lore Elementary School
- Highlands Elementary School
