= Wilmington School District =

Former school district in Delaware

Wilmington City School District was a school district based in Wilmington, Delaware.

The city government provided the funding. The board of education had four people; the mayor of Wilmington appointed three of them and the Governor of Delaware appointed the fourth. The U.S. Census Bureau classified this district as an agency of the city government and not as an independent government due to the city funding.

== History ==
In much of its history, students categorized as white attended separate schools from those categorized as black, as part of educational segregation in the United States. Brown v. Board of Education, passed in 1954, was to end such segregation.

In previous years, the majority of school board members and the majority of the people in the district administration were white. In a period before the 1970s, African-Americans gained control of the school district. The district's student body was 79% black in the 1970-1971 school year. Circa that period, of the Delaware districts, this one had among the lowest test scores. In 1971 Irving Morris and Louis R. Redding sued the State of Delaware on behalf of parents of African-American children in the district, arguing that the district was racially segregated in a way that contradicted the U.S. Constitution.

It merged into the New Castle County School District in 1978. Desegregation busing was ordered by Judge Murray M. Schwartz in January of that year. July 1, 1981, the NCC district was scheduled to be dissolved, divided into four parts. The new districts were: Brandywine School District, Christina School District, Colonial School District, and Red Clay School District.

Circa 1997 to 2007 there had been discussion in Delaware on whether the Wilmington School District should be recreated.

== Schools ==
- Wilmington High School
- Charles B. Lore Elementary School
