= Newark High School (Delaware) =

Location
- 750 East Delaware Avenue; Newark, Delaware 19711; United States; 39°40′48″N 75°44′20″W

Information
- Type: Public secondary
- Motto: Excellence is the Expectation
- Established: 1893 (133 years ago)
- School district: Christina School District
- Principal: Tina Pinkett (2022 - Present)
- Teaching staff: 65.00 (FTE)
- Grades: 9–12
- Enrollment: 1,155 (2023-2024)
- Student to teacher ratio: 6.23
- Campus type: Urban
- Colors: Black and gold
- Athletics: 24 varsity sports (1 club sport)
- Athletics conference: Blue Hen Conference - Flight A
- Mascot: Yellowjacket (named Buzz)
- Yearbook: Krawen
- Website: newark.christinak12.org

Newark High School is a public high school in Newark, Delaware, and is one of three high schools within the Christina School District. It is one of the oldest educational institutions in the state, graduating its first class of students in 1893. In 2009, it saw its 20,000th student graduate.

Newark has been named by Newsweek magazine as one of their "Top Schools in America." In 2006 Newark was ranked #521, in 2007 it was #271, and in 2008 it was #1041. This list represents the top 5% of the schools in the nation based on the number of AP, IB, and Cambridge exams taken divided by students graduating. The school was also named a GRAMMY Signature School in 2010 by the GRAMMY Foundation for its outstanding commitment to music education. Newark won the DIAA Sportsmanship Award in 2003, 2004, 2005, and 2006.

The school serves a portion of Wilmington. In the suburbs it serves almost all of Newark, most of Brookside, and the Christina School District portions of North Star, Pike Creek, and Pike Creek Valley. Within Wilmington it serves the Church Street Historic District.

== History ==
A majority of this section comes from the Histories of Newark (1758-2008): Seventy-five stories about Newark, Delaware and its Citizens chapter on Newark High School, published in 2008.

=== 1893–1897 ===
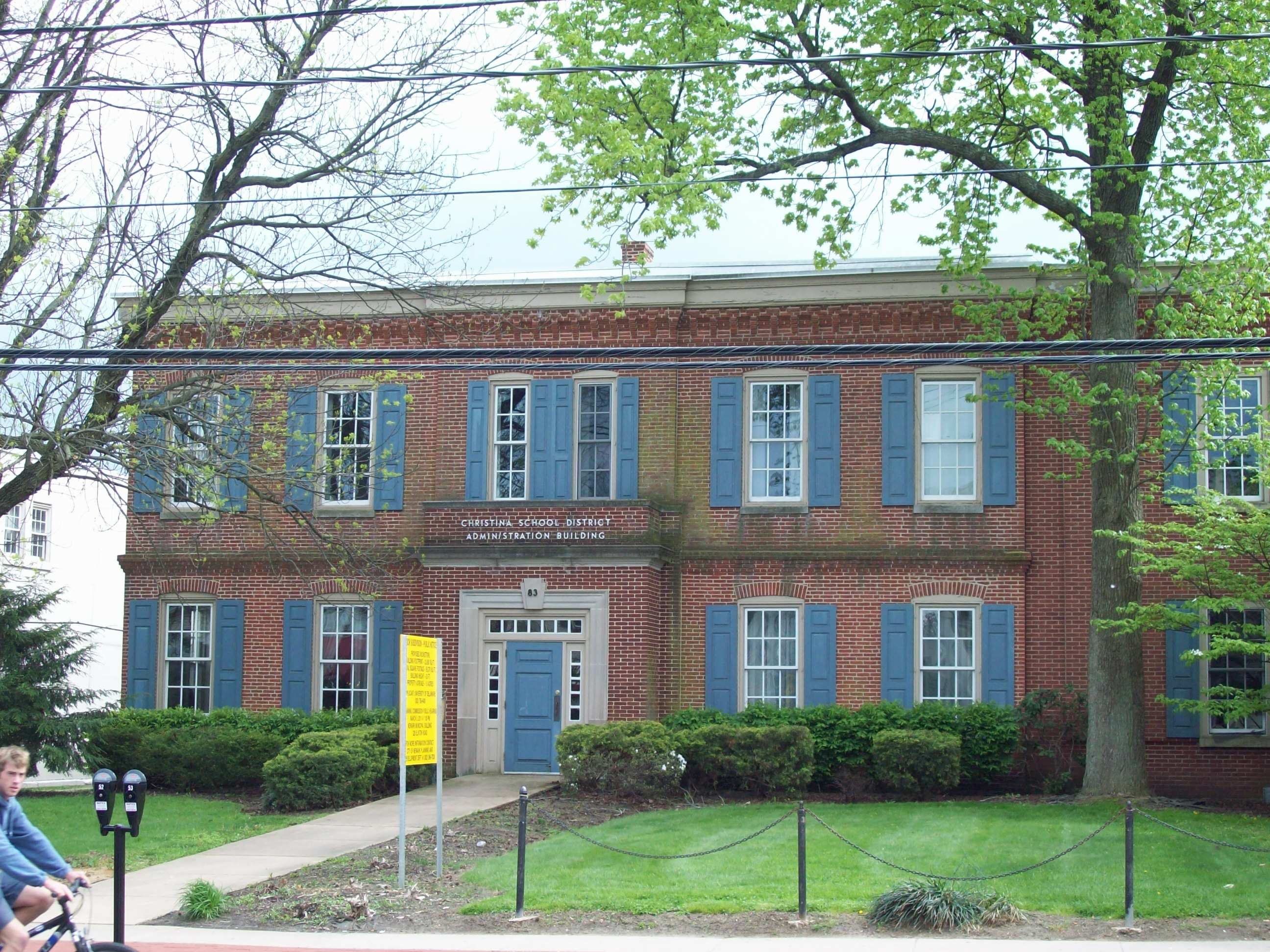
Old Newark Comprehensive School building

The first incarnation of what became Newark High School was located at 83 East Main Street in downtown Newark. The building itself belonged to the Unified School District and was erected by the town in 1884 at a cost of $10,000. When it was built, students wishing to pursue an education past the eighth grade would have had to move to nearby Wilmington, Delaware, or attend private schools, like the nearby Newark Academy.

Originally intended to instruct students through eighth grade, the building began college preparation (high school level) classes on the second floor of the building in the early 1890s. The first graduating class consisted of nine students in 1893, nearly matching the number of faculty members at the time (five).

Slowly, as the town began to grow, conditions began to get cramped at 83 East Main Street. When the school (and its 185 students from first through twelfth grade) moved to a larger facility in 1898, 83 East Main Street remained the school district's primary school until the 1920s, served as part of the high school's vocational program until the 1950s, and became the headquarters for the Newark Special School District through 1981. When the Christina School District was created in 1981, the location was absorbed by the new district and continued to be used as the district headquarters until 2004.

The building is currently owned by the University of Delaware, which renovated the building in 2011 and currently serves as its primary bookstore. This building has been listed on the National Register of Historic Places since 1982 and as such the exterior of the building will remain intact.

=== 1898–1924 ===
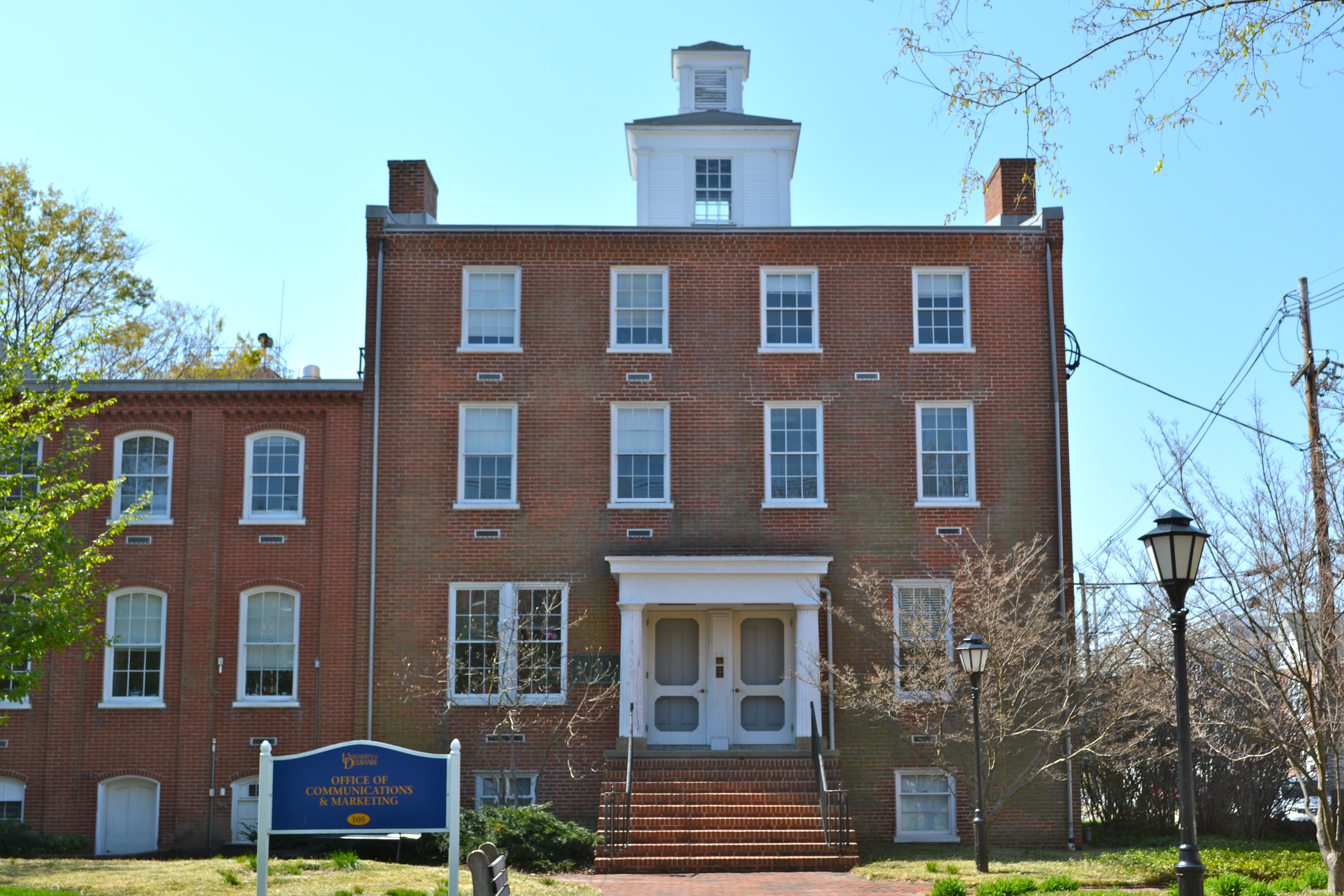
Academy of Newark building

In 1898, the school population moved to the recently vacated Academy of Newark Building at the corner of Main and Academy Streets in Newark. The Newark Academy, which had previously occupied the building, had closed the previous year. The building itself was constructed in 1843 and was originally home to the Academy of Newark, a predecessor to the University of Delaware.

While at the Academy Building, the only prolonged educational interruption in Newark's history occurred. During October 1918, classes were suspended for three weeks due to the Spanish flu, which was particularly bad in the Philadelphia metro area. No students or faculty members are believed to have died from the influenza pandemic in 1918. A total of 109 students attended Newark that year (28 of whom were seniors) under the direction of seven faculty members.

The daily routine at the Newark Public School (as it was called then) started at 8 am and ended at 4 pm. All sports games and practices were held behind Wolf Hall on the University of Delaware campus since they had the only available sports fields in the area at the time. Various traditions, most notably the first documented prom at Wolf Hall in 1923, began during this period in Newark's history.

As the school continued to grow, a report on Delaware schools conducted by Columbia University ended up spurring the local community to build a more modern facility. The report listed various problems, calling the building an "inadequate fire trap" with "narrow halls", "inaccessible" outhouses and a basement "deep in mud and water."

In 1921 grades 7-8 were moved from the Eden School (now Leasure Elementary School) in Bear to Newark High.

Currently, the Newark Academy Building belongs to the University of Delaware and is home to the Office of Public Relations. It has been listed on the National Register of Historic Places since 1976.

=== 1924–1956 ===
The third incarnation of what became known as Newark High School (housing grades one through twelve) was built in 1924 at a cost of $417,225 off of High Street (later renamed Academy Street). Local philanthropist Pierre S. DuPont was one of the main benefactors of the district when it sought construction money for the building, donating $125,000.

A few blocks away on New London Road, the Newark Colored School was built for the African-American population of Newark for $36,250. Over 50% of the cost, about $19,000, was donated once again by DuPont, making the Newark Colored School one of the most expensive one room schoolhouses in the country (although it still paled in comparison in terms of facilities and faculty).

While at the High Street address, Newark saw the birth of the school newspaper, The Yellowjacket Buzz, in 1936. The paper was originally produced monthly, and by the 1940s it was published twice a month. It was sold for 10 cents a copy. Originally starting as a supplement in the Buzz, the first yearbook (the Krawen) was published in 1941. The paper-covered book was 60 pages long and contained advertisements to help keep the cost to students down. Both the Buzz and Krawen are among the oldest continuously running student-run publications in Delaware.

The first documented senior class trip, which stayed in the Lafayette Hotel in Washington, D.C. after traveling by train, took place in 1938. The following year, the Class of 1939 traveled to New York City and visited the 1939 World's Fair. As a sign of the growing nature of NHS, 1939 was also the first year with split lunches.

When World War II arrived, many faculty members (and eventually several students) were either drafted or enlisted in the military. Several members of the Class of 1944 were called upon to teach classes due to a shortage of available teachers. Arthur Gribble, William Lehman, Anthony Gaskiewicz, Ollie Salminen, Oliver Suddard, and Eugene Campbell (Class of 1944); Frank Sanborn, Walter "Cueball" Martin, Howard Dean, "Ebbie" Lewis, "Alex" Zabenko, Robert Davis, Gerald Gilston, Lewis McCormick, Henry Hammond, Hugh McKinney, Herbert Murphy, Oscar Pickett and Thomas Runk (Class of 1945) all enlisted in the service prior to their graduations. Another long-term impact on student life at Newark began as Driver's Education became a class in 1944.

Following the war, an influx of families to the city of Newark (which only increased with the building of I-95 nearby) caused the student population to swell at a rate of nearly 15% a year between 1945 and 1960. Enrollment jumped at NHS from 586 in 1956 to 1096 in 1960. This growth eventually led to calls for a newer facility, which was completed in 1956.

The High Street building was transformed into Central Middle School following the move and continued to serve the Newark community until 1981. In 1983, it was sold to the University of Delaware, who rededicated the building in 1994 as Pearson Hall. It currently houses the Geography Department, the Communications Department, and SLTV (UD's student-run television network).

The site of the Newark Colored School was bought by the City of Newark following the integration of both populations in 1956. The building, now known as the George Wilson Center, is still used by the City of Newark for meetings and events.

=== 1956–present ===
With an increasing population in the city and the 1954 Brown v. Board of Education ruling, the current incarnation of Newark High School opened as an integrated school able to serve a student population of around 1,000. At a cost of $3,532,312.24, the facility at 750 East Delaware Avenue was completed in 1956. The school's present building was completed in 1957 to designs by E. William Martin, an architect who lived in Newark. It was not quite ready for the first day of school, and split sessions were used to begin the year. In October 1956, the 10–12th graders came to the Academy Street address, collected their books and walked a half mile to the new school.

The school itself was later expanded in 1970 in order to accommodate additional growth, adding the three-story E and D wings, a second cafeteria, a new library, and a second gym, which was among the largest in the area at the time. The only difference in the classrooms between the old wing and the new wing was the lack of a teacher office in the classroom. Christiana High School was also opened in 1963 to alleviate overcrowding concerns at Newark. With the expansion, ninth grade was added to the building.

1962 also saw the beginning of athletic excellence in cross country when the Yellowjackets won both the Blue Hen Conference and State Championships for the first time in school history. Led by a trio of phenoms, Jake Correll (the Machine), Sami Bandak (the Spark Plug) and Jonathan Owens (The Big O), Newark defeated Brandywine High School 23–32 for the Conference Crown and earned the State title by 76-77 over Salesianum.

In 1995, a random spectator broke his watch when he punched the wall during a basketball game. His legacy lives on to this day. Today, Newark features four classroom wings on three floors (103 classrooms in all), five administrative centers, two cafeterias, two gyms, a telecommunications studio (which started cable-casting in 1970), a distance learning lab, a Wellness Center (since 1994), nearly 800 computers available for student use, a library (with 20,000 books), and a 700-seat auditorium.

Despite its location within the city limits of Newark, by the 1970s Newark was known, at least in ag circles, as “the farm school” in the state of Delaware. At its height, NHS had five ag teachers at that time, owned and harvested crop fields, and had a working farm shop. The centerpiece of this program was the greenhouse behind the school, which was the largest in the state until falling into disrepair due to a lack of funding in the late 2000's and early 2010's.

The campus' athletic facilities include a 400-meter track and field with shot-put and discus throwing areas; long, triple, and high jump facilities and a pole-vaulting area; a soccer field that doubles as the baseball field's outfield; a football field that doubles as a soccer and lacrosse field; two softball fields and six tennis courts. The building was last renovated in 1998, although several capital improvements, such as central air for the entire building, were approved in a 2002 referendum and completed in 2006.

Newark hosted a Millennium Reunion in June 2000. The event was the brainchild of NHS 1978 grad the late Kay Cole Buglass, and welcomed alumni from all graduating years up till 2000. The event was hosted by many volunteer organizations including the then-active Army JROTC unit, the Key Club and many volunteer alumni. The event was a big success that was complemented by the book Buzzing through the Years, authored by Kay, who had written the book to complement the reunion and to provide a detailed history of Newark High School for its alumni. Two copies of this book were provided to the high school's library. The Millennium Reunion was instrumental in the reunion committee receiving an award from the Delaware House of Representatives for building better school spirit. It also revitalized the dormant NHS Alumni Association.

== Demographic information ==
All information for this section can be found at the Delaware School profile page.

=== Students ===
Ethnicity	2013-2014	2012-2013	2011-2012	2010-2011	2009-2010	2008-2009	2007-2008	2006-2007	2005-2006
White, not Hispanic	42.3%	46.3%	46.8%	47.2%	49.4%	49.3%	52.7%	53.6%	56.2%
Black, not Hispanic	36.0%	34.4%	34.0%	35.8%	35.8%	35.7%	33.0%	33.2%	31.8%
Hispanic	14.7%	12.2%	12.1%	10.6%	9.7%	9.8%	9.0%	8.0%	7.6%
Asian/Pacific Islander	5.8%	6.1%	6.6%	5.8%	5.0%	5.2%	5.1%	4.8%	4.0%
Native American/Alaskan Native/Hawaiian Native	0.2%	0.3%	0.2%	0.3%	0.1%	0.0%	0.1%	0.4%	0.4%

- As of the 2012-2013 school year the student to teacher ratio was 16 to 1.
- As of the 2012-2013 school year the percentage of students listed as "English language learner" was 2.5% (down 0.8% compared to the previous year).
- As of the 2012-2013 school year 48% of the student population was listed as "low income" (up 4.7% compared to the previous year).
- As of the 2012-2013 school year 8.1% of the student population was listed as "special education" (up 1.1% compared to the previous year).

=== Faculty ===
Ethnicity	Percentage of staff	Years of teaching experience	Percentage of staff
White, not Hispanic	81.1%	Less than 4 years	24.0%
Black, not Hispanic	16.2%	5 to 9 years	21.0%
Hispanic	1.8%	10 to 19 years	35.0%
Asian American	0.0%	20 to 29 years	14.0%
Native American/Alaskan Native	0.9%	30 or more years	6.0%

- As of the 2011-2012 school year 111 teachers/instructional staff were allocated for NHS.
- As of the 2011-2012 school year all teachers/instructional staff were deemed "highly qualified" by the State of Delaware.
- As of the 2011-2012 school year 46.0% of the instructional staff held a master's degree or higher.
- As of the 2011-2012 school year 6.1% of the instructional staff were NBPTS (National Board for Professional Teaching Standards) certified.

== Academics ==
=== Newark State Testing scores (10th grade) ===
	2014 score	2014 News Journal rank
Math	867	13/38 (was 17th in '13)
Reading	852	19/38 (was 14th in '13)

	2014 score	2013 score	2012 score	2011 score	2010 score	2009 score	2008 score	2007 score	2006 score	2005 score	2004 score	2003 score	2002 score
Math	867 (69%)	859 (69%)	854 (63%)	838 (50%)	533 (54%)	531 (51%)	532 (54%)	523 (56%)	530 (54%)	531 (49%)	538 (55%)	536 (59%)	521 (43%)
Reading	852 (69%)	852 (72%)	833 (61%)	819 (51%)	507 (60%)	513 (62%)	514 (64%)	521 (72%)	511 (63%)	518 (67%)	522 (73%)	520 (73%)	511 (62%)

- Rankings are created by The News Journal and are not used by DOE for classification. They are computed based on the DSTP performances by all Delaware Public High Schools, so while an individual school may score higher or lower from year to year, the ranking indicates how other schools did on the same exam.
- DSTP transitioned to a new web-based test called DCAS in 2011. A new scoring system was developed since the test was taken three times over the course of the school year.

=== Newark SAT scores ===
	Class of '12	Class of '11	Class of '10	Class of '09	Class of '08	Class of '07	Class of '06
Math	n/a	479	504	499	502	516	521
Critical Reading	n/a	487	510	496	501	505	507
Writing	n/a	465	497	482	482	493	494
Combined	n/a	1431	1511	1477	1485	1514	1522

- Class of '11, '12, and '13 scores will include the scores of all students at the school. One of the features of Delaware's successful Race to the Top application was that all public school students would have a special SAT given during school to 11th graders during the month of April (see below).

=== Newark School Day SAT scores ===
	2012 scores	2011 scores
Math	n/a	451
Critical Reading	n/a	442
Writing	n/a	434
Combined	n/a	1327

=== Newark AP Exam scores ===
	# of AP courses offered	# of students taking exams	# of exams taken	# of exams with a 3 or higher	% of passing scores
2002	7	158	164	83	52%
2003	8	187	203	141	69%
2004	10	208	304	215	71%
2005	25	559	605	304	54%
2006	21	358	738	368	50%
2007	23	280	448	180	40%
2008	19	220	323	175	54%
2009	18	304	487	272	56%
2010	26	320	626	358	57%
2011	41	331	442	248	56%
2012	n/a	n/a	n/a	n/a	n/a

- In 2005, 2006, 2011, and 2012 the Christina School District paid the registration fees for any student currently enrolled in an AP class who wished to take the exam.

=== America's Top Schools Ranking (calculated by Newsweek and The Daily Beast) ===
	National rank (top 5% schools)	Rank within Delaware (35 possible)	% graduating with a passing grade on the national exam
2006	521/1236	4/6	22.7%
2007	271/1351	2/9	27.9%
2008	1041/1358	7/9	21.3%

- Advanced Placement courses offered are English Language, French Language, Human Geography, Spanish Language, Statistics, Calculus AB, Calculus BC, Music Theory, World History, English Literature, US History, European History, AP Biology, Physics B, American Government and Politics, Chemistry, Environmental Science, Psychology, Macroeconomics, and Microeconomics.
- In order to make Advanced Placement courses available to all students (and to encourage students to take the exam), the Christina School District paid the Registration fee for all exams in 2005 and 2006. This has resulted in a surge of new courses being offered while also increasing the number of students enrolled in the various AP programs. These changes are reflected in Newark's inclusion on Newsweek's "Top Schools In America" list for the first time in March 2006. Newark's ranking rose nearly 200 places the following year, when Newsweek published the 2007 rankings in May.
- The school remained on Newsweek's "Top Schools" list in 2008, even after the district discontinued the payment program. Newark's AP program was featured in a December 2006 News Journal article discussing the rise in students from all groups taking the test.
- Starting with the 2007 tests (2006-2007 school year), students had to pay the registration fee(s) on their own unless they have a "special financial situation" that precludes them from affording the test. In such a case, the district will make-up the cost of registration.
- Newark also has a large cadre of students involved in the Cambridge Program. The program began during the 2006-2007 school year in ninth grade and expanded to include tenth grade the following year. Newark is the first (and only) Delaware High School to have such a program. Newark's participation in this program was highlighted in a January 2007 News Journal article. Cambridge participation stopped counting as part of the Newsweek calculation in 2009.
- Newark has been a PBS (Positive Behavior Support) school since 2005 and an AVID school since 2008.

== Athletics ==
State Championship Victories since 1942 (39 total) - Blue Hen Conference "Flight A" school

- Football (1976, 1984, 1985, 1997, 1998, 1999, 2000, 2001, 2003, and 2004)
  - NHS football last reached the state championship game in 2011 (lost).
  - Currently is the all-time leader state championship victories.
  - Coach Butch Simpson currently holds the state record for most career coaching victories in football (257) - active streak
- Girls' swimming and diving (1978, 1980, 1981, 1989, 1990, 1992, 2003, and 2004)
- Baseball (1970, 1971, 1974, 1984, 1990, and 1996)
  - NHS baseball last reached the state championship game in 2003 and 2004 (lost both).
- Volleyball (1976, 1981, 1982, 1983, 1984, and 1990)
- Boys' basketball (1982, 1987, and 1990)
  - NHS basketball last reached the state championship game in 2011 (lost).
- Boys' cross country (1962, 1971)
  - NHS Boys' cross country finished 2nd in the DIAA Championship in 2002, 2012 and 2013.
- Boys' swimming and diving (2005)
- Boys' indoor track and field (2004)
- Boys' tennis (1996)
- Softball (1977)

== Feeder pattern ==
In 1988 Wilmer E. Shue Middle School fed into Newark High, but it was physically located within the Christina High attendance boundary, while no middle schools were physically in the Newark High attendance boundary.

== Trivia ==
- Krawen (the name of the yearbook) is "Newark" backwards.
- Newark H.S. received national attention in October 2005 when two members of the Philadelphia Eagles promoted a Christian concert during a school-sanctioned assembly. Although not planned, the resulting fervor led to NHS being the center of a 1st Amendment (public schools and religious expression) debate.
- This Wikipedia entry was featured in the October 2006 edition of NEA Today. The article was entitled "Getting Wiki With It."

== Notable alumni ==
- Melissa Bulanhagui (2008), figure skater
- Malcolm Bunche (2009), football player
- Colin Burns (1999) retired American soccer goalkeeper
- Vincenza Carrieri-Russo (2002), beauty pageant winner, nonprofit founder, entrepreneur
- George V. Chalmers (1927), college athlete
- Katherine Ciesinski (1968), mezzo-soprano
- Zach Clark (2001), minor league baseball player
- Brandy Davis (1941), former MLB player
- Chris Dunn (1968), 1972 Olympic high jumper
- Robert W. Gore (1955), inventor of Gore-Tex
- Kwame Harris (2000), former NFL player
- Orien Harris (2001), former NFL player
- Conway Hayman (1967), former NFL player
- Gary Hayman (1969), former NFL player
- Cristina Henríquez (1995), American author best known for her 2014 novel The Book of Unknown Americans
- Brian Lesher (1989), former MLB player
- Jack Markell (1978), governor of Delaware
- Derrick May (1986), former MLB player
- Rich Parson (1998), football player
- David Raymond (1975), former (and original) Phillie Phanatic
- Terence Stansbury (1979), former NBA player
- Paul Tulley (1960), film and television actor
- Johnny Weir (2002), 2006 and 2010 Olympic figure skater, three-time National Champion
- Vic Willis (1896), former MLB player, inducted into the Baseball Hall of Fame in 1995
