= Glasgow High School =

Glasgow High School may refer to any of several schools.

- High School of Glasgow, an independent school in Glasgow, and the oldest school in Scotland
- Glasgow High School (Delaware) in Newark, Delaware
- Glasgow High School (Kentucky) in Glasgow, Kentucky
