= Tyrell Sturdivant =

American professional basketball player

No. 15 – BBC Arantia Larochette
- Position: Power forward / center
- League: Total League

Personal information
- Born: August 1, 1995 (age 31) Chester, Pennsylvania
- Listed height: 6.7 ft 0 in (2.04 m)
- Listed weight: 230 lb (104 kg)

Career information
- High school: Glasgow High School (Delaware), Chester High School (Pennsylvania)
- College: Stony Brook University
- NBA draft: 2018: undrafted
- Playing career: 2018–present

Career history
- 2018–2019: BBC AS Soleuvre
- 2019–2020: Giessen Pointers
- 2020–present: BBC Arantia Larochette

Career highlights
- All-Regionalliga Second Team (2020); Regionalliga Rebounding Champion (2020); Stony Brook Honor Roll (2015); All-America East Third Team (2017); NABC Honor Court Recognition (2018)

Tyrell Daniel Sturdivant (born August 1, 1995) is an American professional basketball player for BBC Arantia Larochette of the Total League in Luxembourg. He played college basketball for the Stony Brook Seawolves, helping them to their first ever NCAA tournament appearance.

== High school career ==
Sturdivant attended Glasgow High School until his junior year. For his senior year he transferred to Pennsylvania powerhouse Chester High School. As the team captain he led the Clippers to their fourth-straight District 1 Class AAAA championship win, scoring 17 points and a final four appearance in the state championship.

In his senior season, Sturdivant was named to the Second Team All-State, First Team All-County and Third Team All-Area and graduated averaging 15.2 points, 10.5 rebounds, 2.2 blocks and 2.0 steals. He finished his high school career on the Clippers' 1,000-point scorers list (1,190) and was named Chester's Most Outstanding Player.

== College career ==
After graduating high school, Sturdivant attended Stony Brook University, where he was named to the Third-Team All-American East in 2017 and earned NABC Honors Court Recognition in 2018.

In his 2014–15 rookie season, he played 33 games and recorded his first collegiate double-double on November 23 with 11 points and 10 rebounds against the US Merchant Marine Academy. He ended his season as part of the Stony Brook 2014-15 Winter/Spring Honor Roll, averaging 2.8 points and 3.3 rebounds in 11.4 minutes and scoring a season high of 11 points.

As a sophomore in 2015–16, Sturdivant kicked off the season by starting in his first collegiate game against the US Merchant Marine Academy, in which he scored a season high of 7 points. On January 9 he tied this score against UMass Lowell. He played a total of 33 games, averaging 3.1 points and 3.6 rebounds in 11.8 minutes. Sturdivant ended his season with a career high 14 rebounds against Farmingdale State.

The 2016–17 season saw Sturdivant start with his second double-double of his career, scoring 11 points and 10 rebounds against the Columbia Lions. In his junior year he led the team in rebounds, averaging 5.4, and came second in scoring with an average of 10.6 points, while being named to the All-America East Third Team. He started all 32 games and played his first 20-plus point game at Boston College. After scoring 16 points in the second half, Sturdivant led the game, totalling 26 points. On January 16 he scored a career high 28 points against UMass Lowell and finished the season being top 10 in the league in rebounding and top 20 in scoring.

During his 2017–18 senior season, Sturdivant played in all 32 of the Seawolves games, and started 24 of them. For the second time in his career, he earned Honors Court Recognition alongside his teammates Akwasi Yeboah and Bryan Sekunda. He led the team in steals (52), while ranking third in assists (56) and rebounds (145). Sturdivant graduated averaging 7.3 points, 4.5 rebounds, 1.8 assists and 1.6 steals in 22.5 minutes during his final season.

He finished his Stony Brook career with averages of 5.9 points, 4.2 rebounds and 7.3 minutes in a total of 130 games.

== Professional career ==
=== BBC AS Soleuvre (2018–2019) ===
After finishing his career at Stony Brook Sturdivant signed in Luxembourg's N2 League with BBC AS Soleuvre. During his rookie season he averaged 22.3 points, 14 rebounds and 2.4 assists, helping the team to place second in the regular season. Sturdivant ended his first season after 11 games played with a total of 8 30-plus point games and a season high 49 points, 21 rebounds, 6 steals and 6 assists.

=== Giessen Pointers (2019–2020) ===
In his second season as a professional, Sturdivant signed with the Giessen Pointers of Germany's 1. Regionalliga. During his second season he led the team in scoring, averaging 20.6, as well as in rebounds (13.7). He finished the season as the Regionalliga Rebounding Champion and was being awarded All-League Second Team Honors.

=== BBC Arantia Larochette (2020–present) ===
On August 3, 2020, Sturdivant signed with BBC Arantia Larochette of the Total League, making him return to Luxembourg for the 2020–21 season. He led the team in rebounds and came second in scoring, as well as in steals, helping Arantia Larochette to reach the playoffs for the first time in seven years. He finished his third season averaging 19.3 points, 11.6 rebounds, 1.5 assists, 1.7 steals and 35 minutes in a total of 22 games.

In February 2021 Sturdivant had already signed a contract extension with Arantia Larochette for the 2021–22 season. On December 8, he scored 27 points in the quarter-final round of the Luxembourg Cup against Avanti Mondorf, leading his team to their first ever appearance in the half finals of the national knockout cup.

== Career statistics ==
Legend
GP	Games played	GS	Games started	MPG	Minutes per game
FG%	Field goal percentage	3P%	3-point field goal percentage	FT%	Free throw percentage
RPG	Rebounds per game	APG	Assists per game	SPG	Steals per game
BPG	Blocks per game	PPG	Points per game	**Bold**	Career high

=== College ===
Year	Team	GP	GS	MPG	FG%	3P%	FT%	RPG	APG	SPG	BPG	PPG
2014–15	Stony Brook	**33**	0	11.4	.407		.500	3.3	.3	.4	.3	2.8
2015–16	Stony Brook	**33**	1	11.8	**.456**	1.000	.643	3.6	.6	.6	.3	3.1
2016–17	Stony Brook	32	**32**	**23.8**	.445		.640	**5.4**	.6	.6	**.4**	**10.6**
2017–18	Stony Brook	32	24	22.5	.379	.282	**.551**	4.5	**1.8**	**1.6**	**.4**	7.3
**Career**		130	57	17.3	.420	.288	.597	4.2	.8	.8	.4	5.9

=== Professional ===
Year	Team	GP	GS	MPG	FG%	3P%	FT%	RPG	APG	SPG	BPG	PPG
2018–19	AS Soleuvre	10	10	36.2	.407	.358	.677	13.7	2.2	1.5	.5	21.4
2019–20	Giessen Pointers	22	22	29.9	.518	.324	.718	13.7	1.6	2	.5	20.5
2020–21	Arantia Larochette	22	22	35.6	.391	.341	.681	11.6	1.5	1.8	.6	19.3
2021–22	Arantia Larochette	23	23	35.8	.409	.292	.701	11.0	2.0	1.6	.2	20.7
