= North Star, Delaware =

Census-designated place in Delaware, United States

- CDP
- Location within the state of Delaware North Star (the United States)
- Coordinates: 39°45′40″N 75°43′09″W
- Country: United States
- State: Delaware
- County: New Castle

Area
  - Total: 6.80 sq mi (17.62 km^{2})
  - Land: 6.80 sq mi (17.62 km^{2})
  - Water: 0 sq mi (0.00 km^{2})
- Elevation: 351 ft (107 m)

Population (2020)
  - Total: 8,056
  - Density: 1,184.3/sq mi (457.27/km^{2})
- Time zone: UTC-5 (Eastern (EST))
  - Summer (DST): UTC-4 (EDT)
- Area code: 302
- FIPS code: 10-52490
- GNIS feature ID: 216809

North Star is a census-designated place (CDP) in New Castle County, Delaware, United States. As of the 2020 census, North Star had a population of 8,056.

== Geography ==
North Star is located at 39°45′40″N 75°43′09″W (39.7612226, -75.7191006).

According to the United States Census Bureau, the CDP has a total area of 6.8 square miles (18 km^{2}), all land.

== Demographics ==
Historical population
Census	Pop.	Note	%±
2000	8,277		—
2010	7,980		−3.6%
2020	8,056		1.0%

=== 2020 census ===
As of the 2020 census, North Star had a population of 8,056. The median age was 50.4 years. 18.2% of residents were under the age of 18 and 23.2% of residents were 65 years of age or older. For every 100 females there were 96.5 males, and for every 100 females age 18 and over there were 93.9 males age 18 and over.

96.8% of residents lived in urban areas, while 3.2% lived in rural areas.

There were 2,858 households in North Star, of which 30.3% had children under the age of 18 living in them. Of all households, 77.2% were married-couple households, 7.8% were households with a male householder and no spouse or partner present, and 12.6% were households with a female householder and no spouse or partner present. About 12.3% of all households were made up of individuals and 7.4% had someone living alone who was 65 years of age or older.

There were 2,927 housing units, of which 2.4% were vacant. The homeowner vacancy rate was 0.5% and the rental vacancy rate was 7.5%.

Racial composition as of the 2020 census
Race	Number	Percent
White	6,439	79.9%
Black or African American	251	3.1%
American Indian and Alaska Native	2	0.0%
Asian	948	11.8%
Native Hawaiian and Other Pacific Islander	2	0.0%
Some other race	50	0.6%
Two or more races	364	4.5%
Hispanic or Latino (of any race)	210	2.6%

=== 2000 census ===
At the 2000 census there were 8,277 people, 2,629 households, and 2,408 families living in the CDP. The population density was 1,209.5 inhabitants per square mile (467.0/km^{2}). There were 2,651 housing units at an average density of 387.4 per square mile (149.6/km^{2}). The racial makeup of the CDP was 89.60% White, 2.50% African American, 0.07% Native American, 6.68% Asian, 0.02% Pacific Islander, 0.30% from other races, and 0.82% from two or more races. Hispanic or Latino of any race were 1.17%.

Of the 2,629 households 49.9% had children under the age of 18 living with them, 87.3% were married couples living together, 2.9% had a female householder with no husband present, and 8.4% were non-families. 6.8% of households were one person and 1.9% were one person aged 65 or older. The average household size was 3.15 and the average family size was 3.30.

The age distribution was 31.4% under the age of 18, 5.0% from 18 to 24, 27.4% from 25 to 44, 30.7% from 45 to 64, and 5.4% 65 or older. The median age was 39 years. For every 100 females, there were 99.3 males. For every 100 females age 18 and over, there were 98.7 males.

The median household income was $110,616 and the median family income was $113,621. Males had a median income of $81,175 versus $46,603 for females. The per capita income for the CDP was $39,677. About 2.2% of families and 2.4% of the population were below the poverty line, including 3.3% of those under age 18 and none of those age 65 or over.

== Education ==
North Star is divided between the Red Clay Consolidated School District and the Christina School District.

In all of the Red Clay area, North Star Elementary is the zoned elementary school, and H. B. duPont Middle School is the zoned middle school. In portions of the Red Clay area zoned high schools include John Dickinson High School, and Alexis I. duPont High School.

The Christina portion is zoned to Maclary Elementary School, Shue/Medill Middle School, and Newark High School. Previously Grades 5-6 were assigned to Bancroft Intermediate School in Wilmington.

North Star School District 30 merged into the Alexis I. DuPont Special School District effective August 7, 1931. The Alexis DuPont Special school district was reorganized on July 1, 1969, as the Alexis I. DuPont School District. The Alexis I. DuPont district merged into the New Castle County School District in 1978. That district was divided into four districts, among them the Christina and Red Clay districts, in 1981.

== Notable Places ==
North Star contains Woodside Farm Creamery and the Chinese American Community Center.
