= Marc Egerson =

American professional basketball player

Free agent
- Position: Guard

Personal information
- Born: August 10, 1986 (age 40) Wilmington, Delaware
- Listed height: 6 ft 7 in (2.01 m)
- Listed weight: 230 lb (104 kg)

Career information
- High school: Glasgow (Newark, Delaware)
- College: Georgetown (2005–2007); Delaware (2007–2009)
- NBA draft: 2009: undrafted
- Playing career: 2009–present

Career history
- 2009–2010: Ironi Nahariya
- 2010–2011: Saint John Mill Rats

Career highlights
- First-team All-CAA (2009)

Marc Egerson (born 1986) is an American professional basketball player who last played for the Saint John Mill Rats of the National Basketball League of Canada.

Before going professional, Egerson was an American college basketball player for the University of Delaware Blue Hens men's basketball program. He was named to the 2009 National Association of Basketball Coaches Division 1 All-District 10 First Team and was named to the 2009 All-Colonial Athletic Association First Team.

== Biography ==
=== High school career ===
Egerson was born in Wilmington, Delaware. He began his high school basketball career at Thomas McKean High School in 2001–02. He then transferred tdo Glasgow High School. While playing for Glasgow, he was selected as the 2003 and 2004 Delaware High School Player of the Year. In 2003 Egerson lead the Dragons to a Delaware State Championship. Egerson transferred to Lutheran Christian for the 2004–05 season, his senior season.

=== College career ===
Egerson played the 2005–06 and 2006–07 seasons at Georgetown. In the 2006–07 season Egerson played thirteen games and started three while averaging 7.5 points and 4 rebounds a game. He then transferred to Delaware in the fall of 2007. After sitting out the first seven games of the 2007–08 season due to NCAA transfer rules, Marc started the final twenty-four games that season. He averaged 13.4 points, 6.9 rebounds and 3 assists. Marc was recognized for his achievement on the court with a Third Team All-CAA selection. Egerson improved on his 2007–08 season in 2008–09 by averaging 15.6 points, 10.3 rebounds and 2.6 assists a game. Marc was the only player that season to average more than 15 points, 10 rebounds and 2.5 assists. Marc ranked 15th in rebounds and was one of seventeen players in NCAA Division I to average at double-double. Egerson was awarded for his efforts with a selections to the National Association of Basketball Coaches (NABC) Division I All-District 10 First Team and the First Team All-CAA.

=== Professional career ===
He worked out for Doc Rivers in a predraft camp with the Boston Celtics in the summer of 2009. Prior to the 2009–2010 season, Egerson signed with Ironi Nahariya from the Israeli Basketball Super League, until December 2010. The Saint John Mill Rats selected the former Georgetown Hoya 6'7 235 lb forward with the 4th overall pick in the 2010/2011 Premier Basketball League Draft. He is the team's leading scorer in the pre-season.
