= Kwame Harris =

Jamaican player of American football (born 1982)

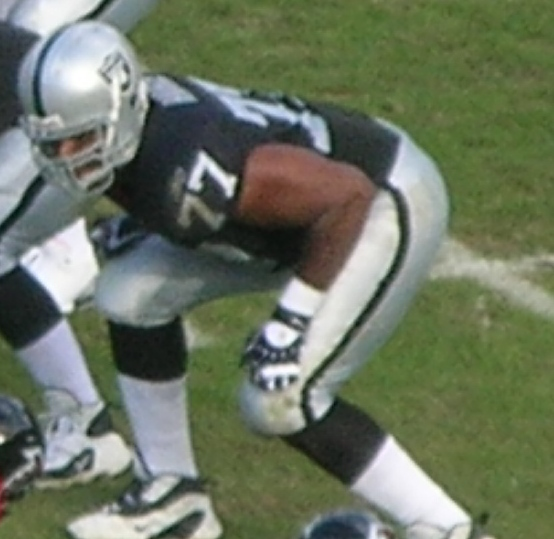
- Harris with the Oakland Raiders in 2008

No. 77
- Position: Offensive tackle

Personal information
- Born: March 15, 1982 (age 44); Jamaica
- Listed height: 6 ft 7 in (2.01 m)
- Listed weight: 320 lb (145 kg)

Career information
- High school: Newark (Newark, Delaware, U.S.)
- College: Stanford
- NFL draft: 2003: 1st round, 26th overall pick

Career history
- San Francisco 49ers (2003–2007); Oakland Raiders (2008); Florida Tuskers (2010)*
- * Offseason or practice squad member only

Awards and highlights
- Morris Trophy (2002); First-team All-Pac-10 (2002); Second-team All-Pac-10 (2001)

Career NFL statistics
- Games played: 86
- Games started: 55
- Fumble recoveries: 4
- Stats at Pro Football Reference

Kwame Harris (born March 15, 1982) is a Jamaican professional player of American football who was an offensive tackle for six seasons in the National Football League (NFL). He played college football for the Stanford Cardinal, when he won the Morris Trophy as the top offensive lineman in the Pac-10 Conference in 2002. He was selected by the San Francisco 49ers with the 26th overall pick in the first round of the 2003 NFL draft.

Harris played high school football in Delaware, and was among the top prep offensive lineman in the country. He played three years at Stanford, twice earning all-conference honors and earning named honorable mention All-American in his final season. Harris was among the top-rated offensive linemen available in the 2003 draft, and he played five seasons with the 49ers and one with Oakland Raiders. He was a starter for most of his career, but often struggled with blocking and committing penalties.

== Early life ==
Harris was born in Jamaica and came to the United States when he was three years old. His family first settled in The Bronx, New York before moving to Delaware, where Harris' father operated multiple successful restaurants. Harris started playing the piano at age five and the violin in seventh grade. He grew up in Newark, Delaware, and attended Newark High School. Harris played violin in his high school orchestra along with playing high school football. He was a unanimous All-American selection and generally considered one of the top prep offensive linemen in the nation.

As a child, Harris knew he was attracted to men. In high school, when confronted by his mom about his sexuality, he came out as gay to his family. Not all of them were initially supportive, contributing to Harris's decision to attend Stanford University on the opposite coast.

== College career ==
Harris was a music major at Stanford. He played three years of football for the Cardinal, and he was a two-year starter at right tackle. Harris played seven games at left tackle in his freshman year, when he was the team's top reserve offensive lineman. He became one of the top lineman in the Pac-10 Conference, earning Second-team All-Pac-10 honors in his sophomore year after starting 12 games at right tackle. In his final season in 2002, Harris started 11 games, and he was named First-team All-Pac-10 and won the Morris Trophy as the top offensive lineman in the conference. He was also an honorable mention All-American and an honorable mention Academic All-Pac-10. Harris gave up his final year of eligibility at Stanford to enter the NFL.

== Professional career ==
Pre-draft measurables
Height	Weight	Arm length	Hand span	40-yard dash	10-yard split	20-yard split	20-yard shuttle	Three-cone drill	Vertical jump	Broad jump
6 ft 7 in (2.01 m)	310 lb (141 kg)	34 1/4 in (0.87 m)	10 5/8 in (0.27 m)	5.20 s	1.73 s	2.96 s	4.65 s	7.98 s	35 1/2 in (0.90 m)	8 ft 11 in (2.72 m)
All values from NFL Combine.

=== San Francisco 49ers ===
Harris was ranked the No. 2 offensive tackle available in the 2003 NFL draft, behind only Jordan Gross. He was selected in the first round of the 2003 NFL Draft with the 26th overall pick by the San Francisco 49ers, and he played five seasons with the team. He started 37 consecutive games from 2004 to 2007, beginning with the final five games of 2004 at left tackle, followed by 32 games at right tackle the two years after. Harris was a good run blocker, but he was inconsistent on pass protection, struggling to block defensive linemen while frequently committing penalties. He allowed nine sacks and committed 15 penalties including seven false starts in 2005, and eight sacks with four holding penalties and one false start the following year. The 49ers drafted Joe Staley in the first round in 2007, and he won the starting job at right tackle as Harris was relegated to a backup role in his final year.

=== Oakland Raiders ===
In 2008, Harris signed a three-year contract for $16 million with the Oakland Raiders, who hoped that line coach Tom Cable could revive his career. He started 11 games that year. Late in the season, however, he again struggled with his blocking and penalties, and the Raiders released him after the season.

=== Florida Tuskers ===
He retired after being cut in 2010 by the Florida Tuskers in the United Football League, and he was replaced by former Pittsburgh Steelers offensive guard Darnell Stapleton. He played six seasons in his NFL career, starting 55 times in 86 games. Profootballtalk.com called Harris "a major disappointment in the pros." Harris partly attributed his decline to the pressure of hiding his sexuality.

== After football ==
Harris returned to college after retiring from football in order to complete his undergraduate degree.

On November 4, 2013, Harris was convicted on misdemeanor counts of domestic violence, assault and battery against his ex-boyfriend, Dimitri Geier, stemming from an incident on August 21, 2012. He was acquitted of felony counts of domestic violence causing great bodily injury and assault with force likely to produce great bodily injury. Geier also sued Harris for assault, battery, false imprisonment, negligence and both intentional and negligent infliction of emotional distress, but later dropped the lawsuit. According to the suit, Harris became upset and the two men argued after Geier poured soy sauce on a plate of rice at a restaurant in Menlo Park, California. The situation escalated as the two exchanged blows. Harris' attorney, Alin Cintean, said Geier assaulted Harris first. "Unfortunately, Mr. Geier is the one who ended up with an injury," he said. Harris' defense team argued that the statute of limitations on the misdemeanor charges for the 2012 incident had expired. However, the judge sentenced Harris to five days in jail and three years of probation, and ordered him to take domestic violence counseling and pay a fine.

After the incident became public, Cintean stated that Harris identifies as gay, remarking that "he is a very private person. He doesn't like to talk about his personal life." On March 29, 2013, Harris came out as gay during an interview with CNN. Until Michael Sam in 2014, no NFL player had come out while they were playing, and only a few had after retiring.

He was inducted into the Delaware Sports Hall of Fame in 2023.

== Personal life ==
Harris' younger brother, Orien, also played in the NFL as a defensive tackle. Their older brother, Duevorn, was a defensive tackle in the Arena Football League.

== See also ==
- Homosexuality in American football
- List of lesbian, gay, bisexual, and transgender sportspeople
