= Church Street Historic District (Wilmington, Delaware) =

Historic district in Delaware, United States

- U.S. National Register of Historic Places
- U.S. Historic district
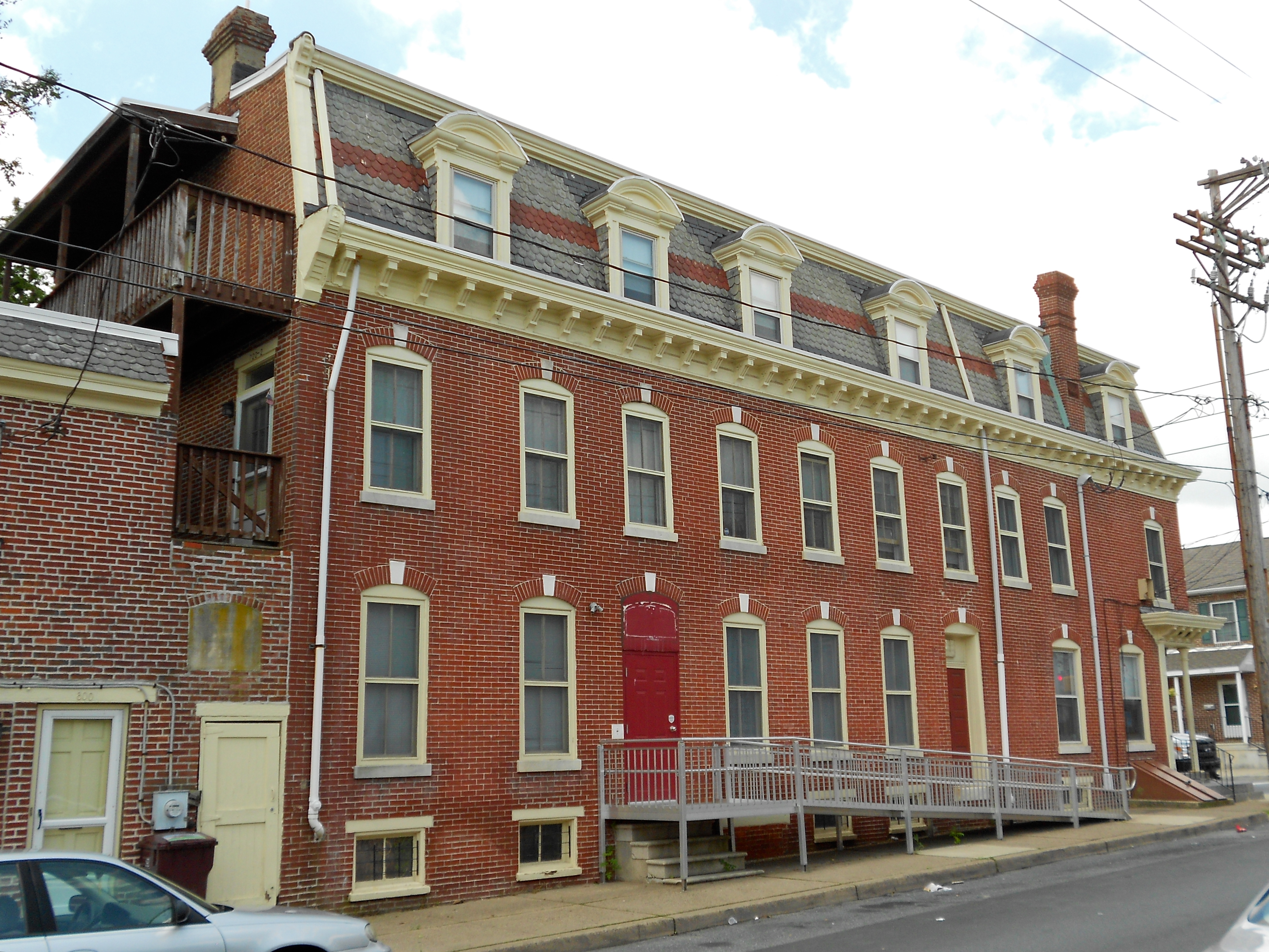
- Empire style building at 8th and Church

- Location within Delaware Location within the United States
- Location: Bounded by Eighth, Locust, Seventh, and Church Sts., Wilmington, Delaware
- Coordinates: 39°44′21″N 75°32′26″W
- Area: 1.3 acres (0.53 ha)
- Built: 1880
- Architectural style: Second Empire, Queen Anne
- NRHP reference No.: 87000944
- Added to NRHP: June 12, 1987

Church Street Historic District is a national historic district located at Wilmington, New Castle County, Delaware. It encompasses 26 contributing buildings, 22 of which are single family fully attached rowhouse dwellings. They are primarily two-story, brick structures. It also includes a large Second Empire building which was originally a saloon and hotel, a bar and restaurant which also has Second Empire elements, and a smaller Queen Anne style store. The area developed between about 1880 and 1920 and many residents worked for the railroad.

It was added to the National Register of Historic Places in 1987.

== Education ==
Residents are in the Christina School District. They are zoned to Bancroft School (K-5), Bayard School (for grades 6–8), and Newark High School.
