= Delaware School for the Deaf =

Public school in Brookside, Delaware, US

Location
- 630 E. Chestnut Hill Rd; Brookside (Newark postal address), Delaware 19713; United States; 39°40′29″N 75°42′23″W

Information
- Type: Public school
- Established: 1929 (97 years ago)
- School district: Christina School District (operator)
- Dean: Eva Hartmann
- Director: Laurie Kettle-Rivera
- Staff: 90+
- Faculty: 27 (FTE) (2019–2020)
- Grades: K–12
- Enrollment: 108 (2019–2020)
- Language: American Sign Language and English
- Campus type: Suburban
- Colors: Royal blue and white
- Athletics: Girls' volleyball, boys' soccer, boys' and girls' basketball and track & field
- Athletics conference: Eastern Schools for the Deaf Athletic Association and Mid-Atlantic Independent League
- Mascot: Blue Hawks
- Website: www.dsdeaf.org

Delaware School for the Deaf (DSD) is a public K–12 school located on East Chestnut Hill Road in Brookside, Delaware, United States; It has a Newark postal address. The Christina School District operates the school, but because it is state-funded, the budget is separate from the rest of the district. DSD operates Delaware Statewide Programs for the Deaf, Hard of Hearing, and Deaf-Blind.

== Mission ==
The mission of the Delaware School for the Deaf, a program serving deaf and hard of hearing students from birth through twenty-one years of age, is to educate them with rigorous achievement standards, to develop linguistic competence in both American Sign Language (ASL) and English, and to prepare them to become contributing citizens, by providing them access to language and information in a safe and supportive learning environment.

== History ==
In 1929, Margaret S. Sterck began teaching students first out of Grace Church and later out of her home on Van Buren Street after noticing that deaf children from Delaware had to be educated out-of-state because no deaf schools existed in Delaware. In 1933, the school became the Delaware School for Deaf Children, Inc. and Sterck bought a home in Lewes to be used as a summer camp. She taught until 1945, when state regulations required that deaf children be taught in public schools. Some students were sent to specialized deaf programs in Delaware public schools while others were enrolled in the Pennsylvania School for the Deaf (PSD) in Philadelphia. By 1960, however, PSD was facing space restrictions and decided to no longer accept out-of-state students.

Families of deaf children, particularly those barred from attending PSD, lobbied the Delaware State Board of Education to find a solution. The state began gathering funding and planning out what would later be called the Margaret S. Sterck School for the Hearing Impaired, which opened in 1969. In 1995, the school was renamed the Delaware School for the Deaf.

Construction of the $43 million new building began in 2009 after two years of delays in getting the government to release the funding. DSD moved into its new building, located on the same campus, in 2011 after more than forty years in the former Sterck School building. The new building has an auditorium, athletic facilities, and a gymnasium as well as boarding facilities, which can accommodate 36 students. There is also an early childhood center on campus.

== Student life ==
DSD has a large racial minority enrollment (65%), with white students making up only 34% of the student body.

=== Academics ===
DSD follows the Christina School District curriculum. Students have the option of taking classes at other schools either within the Christina School District or at one of the city's vocational-technical schools such as Hodgson Vo-Tech High School.

Prior to 1970s, the primary teaching method was oral instruction; it wasn't until Dr. Roy Holcomb introduced the "total communication" philosophy in 1973, which made American Sign Language (ASL) a major component of the school. In 1993, the "bilingual, bicultural" philosophy was adopted and students were taught to hone skills in both ASL and English.

=== Athletics ===
DSD is a member of the Eastern Schools for the Deaf Athletic Association (ESDAA) and Mid-Atlantic Independent League (MIL) and has six sports teams: volleyball (girls), soccer (boys), basketball (girls and boys) and track & field (girls and boys). The DSD mascot is the Blue Hawks and the school colors are royal blue and white. The volleyball team is the winningest of the six sport teams and has been to the ESDAA Division II championships every year from 1999 to 2007, 2010, and 2012–2014; they have been champion four times and as of 2015 have moved up to Division I. The 2019–2020 and 2020–2021 seasons were interrupted by the COVID-19 pandemic. Most recently added sports to school sports program – Boys' Soccer established in fall of 2019, and Track & Field team was established in spring of 2022.

== Notable alumni ==
- Alexandria Wailes, deaf actress, dancer, director, and educator
- Caroline M. Solomon, deaf academic and educator

== Notable teachers/staff ==
- Chuck Baird, deaf artist and performer
