= Old Newark Comprehensive School =

- U.S. National Register of Historic Places
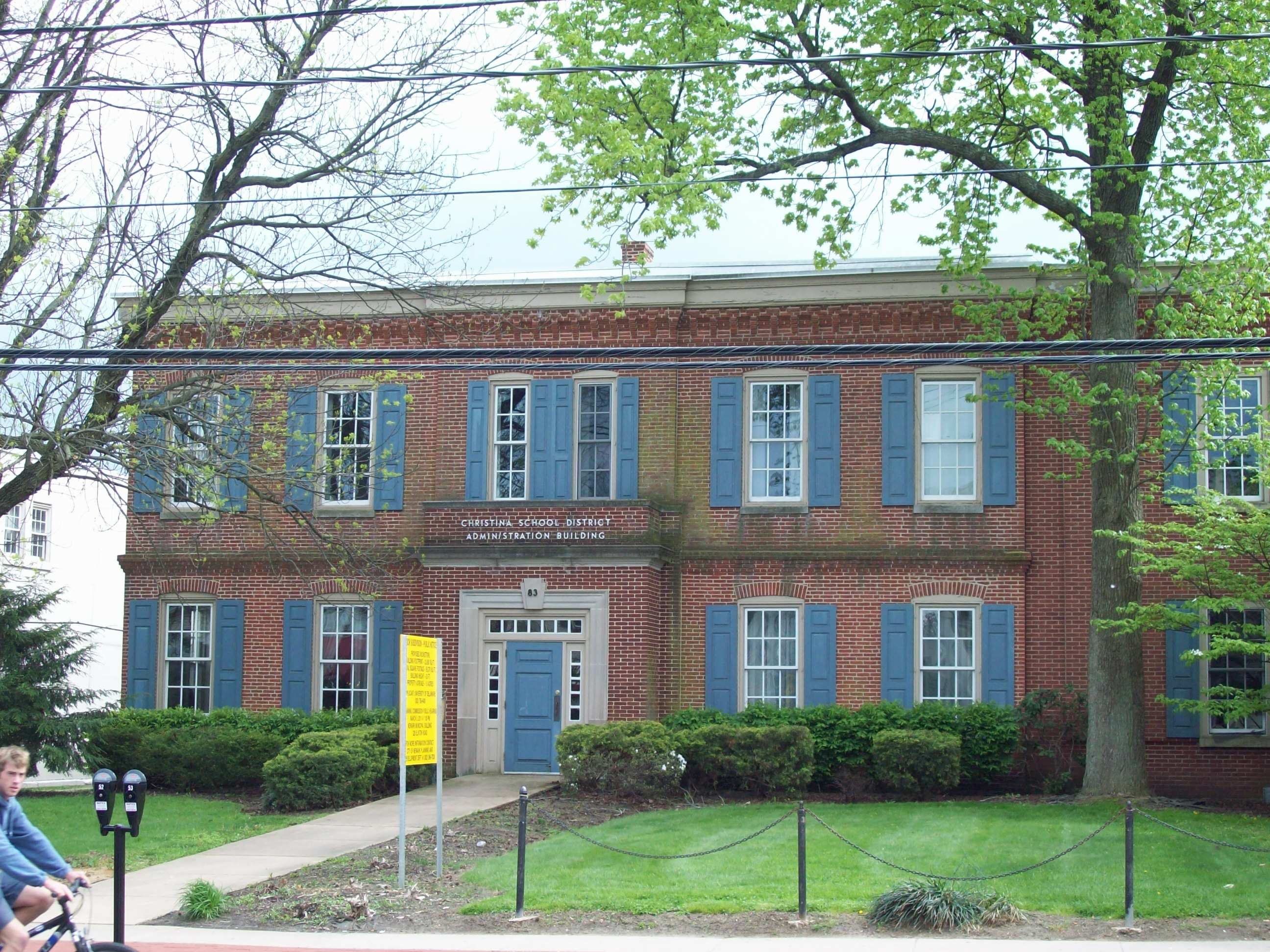
- Old Newark Comprehensive School, April 2010

- Location within Delaware Location within the United States
- Location: 83 E. Main St., Newark, Delaware
- Coordinates: 39°40′59″N 75°45′00″W
- Area: 1 acre (0.40 ha)
- Built: 1884
- MPS: Newark MRA
- NRHP reference No.: 82002348
- Added to NRHP: May 7, 1982

Old Newark Comprehensive School is a historic school building in Newark, Delaware. It was completed in 1884 and is a two-story, rectangular public building. It has five bays at the original north front facade, with a later addition to the west. It housed elementary school grades from the time of its construction to about 1900. It housed the high school's industrial arts program from 1935 until 1965 and then served as the location of the Christina School District's administrative offices, until 2009.

It was added to the National Register of Historic Places in 1982.

== See also ==
- National Register of Historic Places listings in Newark, Delaware
