= The Book of Unknown Americans =

2014 novel by Cristina Henríquez

- Author: Cristina Henriquez
- Language: English
- Genre: Fiction
- Publisher: Alfred A. Knopf
- Publication date: June 3, 2014
- Publication place: United States
- ISBN: 978-0-385-35085-3

The Book of Unknown Americans is a 2014 novel by Cristina Henríquez published by Knopf. The story is primarily set in Newark, Delaware and is told from multiple first-person points of view, with the two main narrators being Alma Rivera, a roughly 30-year-old housewife from Pátzcuaro, Mexico, and Mayor Toro, a teenage social outcast and first-generation Hispanic and Latino American whose parents were originally from Panama.

== Development and publication history ==
Henríquez originally conceived the novel as a short story told from Mayor's point of view. The novel was not originally going to be based in Delaware. The 304-page book was published on June 3, 2014 by Knopf.

== Plot summary ==
The Book Of Unknown Americans by Cristina Henriquez tells the story of Alma and Arturo Rivera who leave their comfortable surroundings in Pátzcuaro when their daughter Maribel suffers a severe head injury. Their journey into the United States leads them to Newark, Delaware, a city with a school for children with developmental disabilities known as Evers. Alma and Arturo hope that enrolling Maribel in Evers will help her recover from her severe brain damage. Arturo obtains a work visa, and he is able to get a job at a mushroom factory. However, the family's life beyond his job remains uncertain; they do not have a stable home environment, Alma does not work, and Maribel has not been officially admitted to Evers.

The Riveras encounter the plight of many poor immigrants. They do not know how to speak English, they are unfamiliar with the school systems, and they are new to American culture. Their story is alternated with chapters telling short stories about other immigrants coming to America and living in the same apartment complex as the Riveras. These short stories highlight the lives and challenges of their friends and acquaintances who form a support network for the family.

The most important friends who offer emotional support when they meet are Rafael and Celia Toro. The Toro family have two sons, Enrique and Mayor, and they live in the same low-income apartment complex as the Riveras. The Toro parents are immigrants from Panama who have become legal citizens but struggle to get by on one meager income. Celia Toro befriends Alma Rivera, and both women grow quite fond of each other. When Celia's son Mayor meets Maribel he is immediately attracted to her. Yet given her inability to speak fluently due to her head injury, he learns to communicate with her through other means. But their relationship is threatened by Garrett Miller, a boy at Mayor's school, who constantly bullies Mayor. One day after school, Garrett follows them and he bullies Mayor and accosts Maribel. Days later, Garrett sexually assaults Maribel. Her mother Alma witnesses the assault, and she immediately goes to the police. The police dismiss the incident in part because Alma does not know how to speak English well. Her lack of English proficiency leads to miscommunications and a misunderstanding of the facts. The police officer characterizes the incident as two teenagers who are most likely infatuated with one another and a mother who is not savvy about these common liaisons among teenagers. Alma is traumatized by the assault, and she is deeply concerned Arturo will blame her for not keeping Maribel safe. Soon after she meets with the police, she decides not to tell Arturo about the entire incident.

Arturo eventually loses his job and he is unable to find a new one. His new unemployment status causes him to lose his visa, and his non-visa status also affects his family's legal standing. They can no longer legally stay in the United States unless he finds another job quickly.

Meanwhile, Quisqueya Solis, a prying neighbor who has also been the victim of assault, tells Alma that Mayor and Maribel were alone together kissing in a car. Quisqueya suggests, by pure speculation, that Mayor may have been taking advantage of Maribel. This news triggers Alma's trauma when she witnessed Garrett assaulting her daughter. She confronts Celia and bans Mayor from seeing her daughter.

One day in March, after the first snowfall of the year, Mayor steals his father's new used car. He drives to Maribel's school and he helps her leave school grounds on false pretenses. They take a drive to the beach. When Maribel does not come home from school, Alma thinks Garrett may have kidnapped her and sexually assaulted her again. This concern leads her to tell her husband the truth about the Garrett Miller assault.

Arturo is infuriated when he hears the news and decides to go to Garrett's house. When he arrives at Garrett's house he encounters Garrett's father, who is also enraged, and who points a gun at Arturo and then pulls the trigger. When Mayor and Maribel return home they learn that Arturo has been shot by Garrett's father. He dies at the hospital, and Alma decides to return home to Mexico shortly after. As a final gesture of friendship, Celia and her other neighbors donate money that Alma needs to transport Arturo's body back to Mexico. Alma believes Maribel is recovered as they are driven back to Mexico. The novel ends with the first and last chapter that is written from Arturo's point of view.

== Themes ==
A theme is an idea or ideas that are prevalent throughout a piece of writing. In The Book of Unknown Americans there are many themes present.

A theme that is prevalent in the novel is the topic of immigration to the United States and the impact it has on people. Almost all the characters in the novel have immigrated from Latin America. Through each chapter, the audience learns the reasons as to why each character immigrated and how their lives changed since coming to the United States. Two subcategories of themes that split off from the main theme of immigration are the experiences that the characters face. One is racism and the other is communication.

Racism is seen throughout the novel in many different forms. There are obvious moments of racism such as when Garret Miller made offensive commentary towards Alma, telling her to go back to her ‘home.’ There are also more discreet moments where the characters experience microaggressions because of their identity.

Another sub-theme is communication. The main characters in the novel Alma and Arturo do not speak fluent English and face many struggles because of that. An example of this is when Alma and Arturo could not communicate with the school about Maribel’s situation and had to speak through a translator. Although they were given a translator, they still had a gap in their communication.

Education and Access:

What is special education: Special education is where a child gets support where there lacking. Maribel's family immigrates to the United States for special education resources that are not available in Mexico. Much of the novel's conflict is driven by the families challenges in accessing special education services to their daughter. For example, special education services provide IEPS which is individualized education plan where individualized support is assigned to the child. A 504 plan is a formal plan for how a school will remove barriers so a student with a disability can learn alongside peers in general education. Doesn’t include specially designed instruction. It helped Maribel get where she is and is one explanation for her improved well-being.

== Characters ==
=== Main characters ===
Alma Rivera - The novel is told mainly through the perspective of Alma, the Rivera family matriarch. Nearly every third chapter is one in which Alma narrates her plight. She is married to Arturo Rivera and the mother of Maribel. She holds herself responsible for her daughter's head injury and is plagued by guilt.

Arturo Rivera - Husband of Alma Rivera and father of Maribel Rivera. Before moving to Delaware, he owned his own construction company, which is where Maribel had her accident. In the United States, he works for a mushroom factory that sponsored his work visa in order for them to live in the United States. Despite the hardships he and his family face in this new country, he has a good disposition and he takes great pride in his family.

Maribel Rivera - Daughter of Alma and Arturo. In Mexico, she fell from a ladder where her dad was working, after her mom failed to hold it steady. Due to her accident she suffered severe brain damage that left her with developmental delays, memory loss, headaches and sensitivity to lights. She is the only character in the novel that does not narrate a chapter.

Mayor Toro - Mayor narrates a substantial portion of the story, revealing his family's economic disadvantage. He is a young teenage boy, the son of Panamanian immigrants Cecilia and Rafael, and he is in love with Maribel Rivera. He finds a kinship with her in their shared experience as poor first-generation immigrants trying to assimilate in American culture. They also share similar character traits, as quiet, sensitive and well-intentioned teenagers.

Celia Toro - Wife of Rafael Toro, with whom she has two sons, Enrique and Mayor. She is acutely aware of her family's dire financial situation, and she offers to help by finding employment. But Rafael refuses to let her work because he thinks she needs to focus on child care and household duties. Although she finds his refusal to let her work frustrating, she obeys her husband. She also befriends Alma Rivera, and they become close confidants. She misses Panama and wishes to go back and visit.

Rafael Toro - Husband of Celia and subscribes to traditional gender roles. He firmly believes a women's place is in the home and men should financially provide for their family. He also exhibits an inability to express emotion and harsh attitude towards his son Mayor's sensitivity. He is particularly upset with the Mayor's lack of interest in soccer, and he constantly compares Mayor to his older brother Enrique, who attends university on a soccer scholarship.

Garrett Miller - A high school peer of Mayor known for bullying Mayor and Maribel. He sexually assaults Maribel.

Quisqueya Solis - As a young girl, she immigrated to California from Venezuela when her mother married a rich American man. She later left home because of her step-brother and ended up in Delaware. She is a notorious interloper who meddles in Mayor and Maribel's relationship.

Adolfo "Fito" Angelino - The apartment complex landlord.

=== Minor characters ===
Benny Quinto - A young man who leaves the priesthood to eventually make money through undesirable means.

Gustavo Milhojas - Half Mexican and half Guatemalan, Gustavo's mixed background shamed him into emigrating from Mexico. He settles in the apartment complex and supports his family from abroad.

Nelia Zafon - A former dancer of Puerto Rican decent who currently owns the local theater in town.

Jose Mercado - A local resident of the apartment complex who enjoys the creative arts.

Enrique Toro - Mayor's older brother. He attends university on a soccer scholarship.

Ynez Mercado - A Puerto Rican woman who befriends Alma.

Phyllis - A staff member at Evers. She assists Alma with various translations regarding Maribel's school work.

Mrs. Shields - Alma's English teacher.

William - Mayor's closest friend in high school.

== Reception ==
The book received predominantly favorable reviews. In the Los Angeles Review of Books, Daniel Olivas said the book "is as disturbing as it is beautiful, a testament to the mixed blessings our country offers immigrants, who struggle against bigotry and economic hardship while maintaining just enough hope to keep striving for something better...a narrative mosaic that moves toward a heartrending conclusion." In Bustle, Claire Luchette described The Book of Unknown Americans as a "powerful novel...about love: familial love, two kids' first love, love of friends, neighbor, and country." In The Guardian, Sandra Newman felt the "strength of the book is in the quiet details", but criticized Henríquez for spending "too much time on the periphery of her story, making points that feel at once too vague and too obvious." Reviewing the novel in The New York Times, Ana Castillo found the novel "unfailingly well written and entertaining, [but] more often than not the first-person accounts don't seem quite authentic."

The novel was chosen as one of The Best Books of 2014 by Amazon.com. The Daily Beast named it the 2014 novel of the year.
