= Orien Harris =

American football player (born 1983)

No. 93, 95, 69
- Position: Defensive tackle

Personal information
- Born: June 3, 1983 (age 43); Mount Vernon, New York, U.S.
- Listed height: 6 ft 3 in (1.91 m)
- Listed weight: 300 lb (136 kg)

Career information
- High school: Newark (Newark, Delaware)
- College: Miami (FL)
- NFL draft: 2006: 4th round, 133rd overall pick

Career history
- Pittsburgh Steelers (2006)*; Cleveland Browns (2006); Buffalo Bills (2007)*; New Orleans Saints (2007); Cincinnati Bengals (2008); St. Louis Rams (2009)*; Detroit Lions (2009); Cincinnati Bengals (2009); Virginia Destroyers (2011–2012)
- * Offseason or practice squad member only

Awards and highlights
- UFL champion (2011); BCS national champion (2001); Second-team All-American (2005)

Career NFL statistics
- Total tackles: 21
- Stats at Pro Football Reference

Orien J. Harris (born June 3, 1983) is an American former professional football player who was a defensive tackle in the National Football League (NFL). He was selected by the Pittsburgh Steelers in the fourth round of the 2006 NFL draft. He played college football for the Miami Hurricanes, where he was a part of the 2001 National Championship team; considered by many to be the greatest college football team of all time.

Harris was also a member of the Cleveland Browns, Buffalo Bills, New Orleans Saints, Cincinnati Bengals, St. Louis Rams and Detroit Lions. He then played for the Virginia Destroyers of the United Football League (UFL) and won the UFL Championship Game in 2011.

== Early life ==
Harris was born to Donovan and Cordel Harris and is the third of four children. He was born in Mount Vernon, New York, and moved to Delaware in the 4th grade. He was an outstanding student athlete at Newark High School in Delaware, where he won multiple state championships along with older brother Kwame. Harris was rated the nation's top defensive line prospect by The Football News and named a High School All-American by The Football News. As a senior, he was named Delaware's Gatorade Player of the Year, Lineman of the Year and Defensive Player of the Year after recorded 130 tackles (95 solos, 35 assists), 9.5 quarterback sacks and a whopping 70 tackles for losses as a senior. His career totals are: 496 tackles (331 solos, 165 assists), 33 quarterback sacks, 252 tackles for losses. He assisted his team to a 12–0 record as a senior and the 2000 Division I State Championship.

== College career ==
Harris attended the University of Miami and was a letterman in football. He was the first athlete in Delaware history to go on athletic scholarship to Miami. In football, he finished his career with 11 sacks, 159 tackles, and a fumble recovery. As a senior, in 2005, Harris played in 12 games and 40 tackles (18 solo) with 11 going for losses and 3.5 sacks and a fumble recovery and was honorable mention All-ACC. As a junior Harris started all 12 games at defensive tackle and was voted the team's Defensive Lineman of the Year after making 55 tackles (16 solo), adding 12 tackles for loss, 14 QB pressures and 1.5 sacks. He was also selected First-team All-ACC by Rivals.com. In 2003, he started 10 of 11 games and recorded 39 tackles (14 solo), eight tackles for loss, four sacks, and 18 quarterback hurries. As a freshman on 2002 he made 36 tackles (14 solos), one sack, one tackle for a loss, 14 quarterback hurries and a fumble recovery. He redshirted in 2001.

== Professional career ==
Pre-draft measurables
| Height | Weight | Arm length | Hand span | 40-yard dash | 20-yard shuttle | Three-cone drill | Vertical jump | Broad jump | Bench press |
|---|---|---|---|---|---|---|---|---|---|
| 6 ft 3 1/4 in (1.91 m) | 301 lb (137 kg) | 32 1/8 in (0.82 m) | 11 1/8 in (0.28 m) | 5.12 s | 4.51 s | 7.43 s | 30.0 in (0.76 m) | 8 ft 6 in (2.59 m) | 25 reps |
All values from NFL Combine/Pro Day

Harris had a 355-pound bench press.

Harris was selected by the Pittsburgh Steelers in the fourth round of the 2006 NFL draft. He officially signed with the team on July 25. He was waived on September 2 and signed to the practice squad on September 4.

On December 12, 2006, Harris was signed to the Cleveland Browns' active roster off of the Browns practice squad. He played in two games during the 2006 season but did not record any statistics. He was waived by the Browns on August 27, 2007.

Harris was signed to the practice squad of the Buffalo Bills on September 27, 2007. He was released on October 4, signed to the practice squad on October 11, released on October 18, and signed to the practice squad again on October 23.

On December 18, 2007, Harris was signed to the New Orleans Saints' active roster off of the Bills practice squad. He was waived by the Saints on August 30, 2008.

Harris was claimed off waivers by the Cincinnati Bengals on August 31, 2008. He played in 14 games, starting one, for the Bengals in 2008, recording four solo tackles and ten assisted tackles. He re-signed with the Bengals on March 2, 2009.

On May 6, 2009, Harris was traded to the St. Louis Rams for running back Brian Leonard.

On July 22, 2009, Harris was traded to the Detroit Lions for wide receiver Ronald Curry. He was waived on September 16.

Harris signed with the Bengals on October 20, 2009. He was waived on November 17 following the signing of Larry Johnson. He was re-signed by the Bengals on November 24, 2009. Overall, Harris appeared in four games for the Bengals in 2009, totaling five solo tackles and two assisted tackles. He was released by the Bengals on September 4, 2010.

Harris played in four games, starting two, for the Virginia Destroyers of the United Football League (UFL) in 2012, accumulating 10 tackles and 0.5 sacks.

== Personal life ==
He is the younger brother of NFL offensive tackle Kwame Harris. He is married to his college sweetheart and singer/musician Alexandra Jackson. They have two daughters. Alexandra is the daughter of Atlanta's first African-American mayor, Maynard Jackson.
