= Newark, Delaware =

City in Delaware, United States

- City
- City of Newark
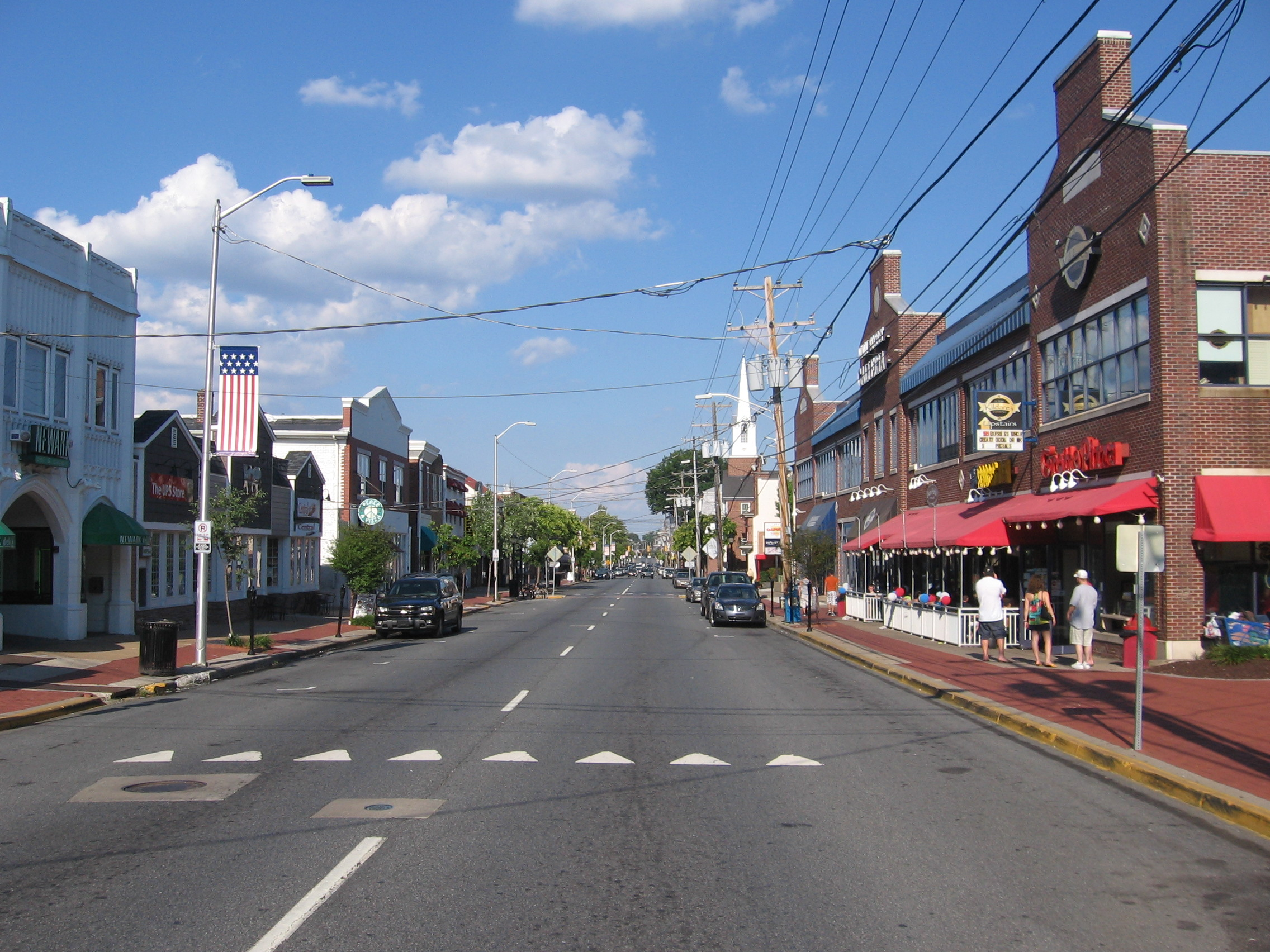
- Main Street is the commercial heart of Newark. It is adjacent to the University of Delaware.

- Flag Seal

- Location of Newark in New Castle County
- Coordinates: 39°41′01″N 75°44′59″W
- Country: United States
- State: Delaware
- County: New Castle
- Founded: 1694
- Incorporated: 1758

Government
  - Type: Council–manager
  - Mayor: Travis McDermott

Area
  - Total: 9.43 sq mi (24.42 km^{2})
  - Land: 9.43 sq mi (24.42 km^{2})
  - Water: 0 sq mi (0.00 km^{2})
- Elevation: 128 ft (39 m)

Population (2020)
  - Total: 30,601
  - Density: 3,246.0/sq mi (1,253.27/km^{2})
- Time zone: UTC-5 (Eastern (EST))
  - Summer (DST): UTC-4 (EDT)
- ZIP Codes: 19702, 19711-19718, 19725
- Area code: 302
- FIPS code: 10-50670
- GNIS feature ID: 214385
- Website: www.newarkde.gov

Newark (/ˈnjuːɑːrk/ NEW-ark) (Note: Not /ˈnjuːərk/ NEW-ərk as in Newark, New Jersey.) is a city in New Castle County, Delaware, United States. Home to the University of Delaware, it is located 8 miles (13 km) west-southwest of Wilmington and 28 miles (45 km) southwest of Philadelphia. According to the 2020 census, the town's population is 30,601. It constitutes part of the Philadelphia metropolitan area.

== History ==
Newark was founded in 1694 by Scots-Irish and Welsh settlers. It was officially established in 1758 when it received a charter from George II of Great Britain.

Schools have played a significant role in the history of Newark. A grammar school, founded by Francis Alison in 1743, moved from New London, Pennsylvania to Newark in 1765, becoming the Newark Academy. Among the first graduates of the school were three signers of the Declaration of Independence: George Read, Thomas McKean, and James Smith. Two of these, Read and McKean, went on to have schools named after them in the state of Delaware: George Read Middle School and Thomas McKean High School.

During the American Revolutionary War, British and American forces clashed outside Newark at the Battle of Cooch's Bridge. Tradition holds that the Battle of Cooch's Bridge was the first instance of the Stars and Stripes being flown in battle.

The state granted a charter to a new school in 1833, which was called Newark College. Newark Academy and Newark College joined in the following year, becoming Delaware College. The school was forced to close in 1859, but was resuscitated eleven years later under the Morrill Act when it became a joint venture between the State of Delaware and the school's board of trustees. In 1913, under the legislative Act, Delaware College came into sole ownership of the State of Delaware. The school was renamed the University of Delaware in 1921.

Newark received a license from King George II to hold semi-annual fairs and weekly markets for agricultural exchange in 1758. A paper mill, the first sizable industrial venture in Newark, was created around 1798. This mill, eventually known as the Curtis Paper Mill, was the oldest paper mill in the United States until its closing in 1997. Methodists built the first church in 1812, and the railroad arrived in 1837.

One of Newark's major sources of employment and revenue was the Chrysler Newark Assembly plant, which was built in 1951. Jamaican reggae star Bob Marley worked as an assembly-line worker at the plant during his short stint in Delaware in the 1960s. Originally constructed to build tanks for the US Army, the plant was 3.4 million square feet in size. It employed 1,100 employees in 2008, which was down from 2,115 in 2005. This turn was due largely to the decline in sales of the Durango and Aspen vehicle models that were being produced. The plant stood for more than 50 years, providing jobs and revenue to the state of Delaware. The factory produced a wide variety of automobile models during its run. The plant was closed in late 2008 due to the recession and limited demand for larger cars.

== Geography ==
Newark is located directly east of the Maryland state line, adjacent to the unincorporated community of Fair Hill, and is less than one mile south of the tripoint where Delaware, Maryland, and Pennsylvania meet, known as The Wedge.

According to the United States Census Bureau, the city has a total area of 9.19 square miles (23.8 km^{2}), all land. Originally surrounded by farmland, Newark is now surrounded by housing developments in some directions, although farmland remains just over the state lines in Maryland and Pennsylvania. To the north and west are small hills, but south and east of the city, the land is flat (part of Newark falls in the Piedmont geological region, and part of the city is in the Coastal Plain geological region, as is the majority of the land in the State of Delaware).

=== Climate ===
According to the Köppen Climate Classification system, Newark has a humid subtropical climate (abbreviated Cfa on climate maps). Summers are hot and humid, with frequent afternoon thunderstorms. Winters are moderate-to-cold, with occasional snow in December, January, and February. Newark averages more than 220 frost-free days. The hardiness zone is 7a.

Climate data for Newark, Delaware (University of Delaware) 1991–2020 normals, extremes 1894–present
Month	Jan	Feb	Mar	Apr	May	Jun	Jul	Aug	Sep	Oct	Nov	Dec	Year
Record high °F (°C)	75 (24)	79 (26)	89 (32)	94 (34)	97 (36)	100 (38)	105 (41)	103 (39)	100 (38)	96 (36)	85 (29)	75 (24)	105 (41)
Mean daily maximum °F (°C)	42.5 (5.8)	45.6 (7.6)	54.2 (12.3)	66.9 (19.4)	75.6 (24.2)	83.8 (28.8)	88.6 (31.4)	86.8 (30.4)	79.4 (26.3)	69.1 (20.6)	56.9 (13.8)	47.0 (8.3)	66.4 (19.1)
Daily mean °F (°C)	33.8 (1.0)	35.5 (1.9)	43.5 (6.4)	54.5 (12.5)	63.8 (17.7)	72.6 (22.6)	77.5 (25.3)	75.7 (24.3)	68.9 (20.5)	57.7 (14.3)	46.4 (8.0)	38.4 (3.6)	55.7 (13.2)
Mean daily minimum °F (°C)	25.1 (−3.8)	25.4 (−3.7)	32.8 (0.4)	42.1 (5.6)	51.9 (11.1)	61.5 (16.4)	66.4 (19.1)	64.7 (18.2)	58.4 (14.7)	46.2 (7.9)	35.9 (2.2)	29.8 (−1.2)	45.0 (7.2)
Record low °F (°C)	−10 (−23)	−12 (−24)	4 (−16)	14 (−10)	28 (−2)	38 (3)	41 (5)	42 (6)	33 (1)	23 (−5)	12 (−11)	−6 (−21)	−12 (−24)
Average precipitation inches (mm)	3.43 (87)	2.91 (74)	4.27 (108)	3.71 (94)	3.63 (92)	3.95 (100)	4.84 (123)	3.95 (100)	4.87 (124)	4.00 (102)	3.36 (85)	4.04 (103)	46.96 (1,193)
Average precipitation days (≥ 0.01 in)	9.3	8.4	11.4	10.7	11.4	8.5	9.2	8.0	8.3	7.4	8.1	9.8	110.5
Source: NOAA

== Demographics ==
Historical population
Census	Pop.	Note	%±
1860	787		—
1870	915		16.3%
1880	1,148		25.5%
1890	1,191		3.7%
1900	1,213		1.8%
1910	1,913		57.7%
1920	2,183		14.1%
1930	3,899		78.6%
1940	4,502		15.5%
1950	6,731		49.5%
1960	11,404		69.4%
1970	21,298		86.8%
1980	25,247		18.5%
1990	25,098		−0.6%
2000	28,547		13.7%
2010	31,454		10.2%
2020	30,601		−2.7%
U.S. Decennial Census

=== 2021 ACS racial makeup ===
2021 ACS racial makeup
Census year	2021 ACS
White	68.2%
Black	8.5%
Asian	7.8%
Hispanic or Latino	11.1%
2 or more	3.7%

=== 2020 census ===
As of the 2020 census, Newark had a population of 30,601. The median age was 24.2 years. 11.0% of residents were under the age of 18 and 13.2% of residents were 65 years of age or older. For every 100 females there were 85.8 males, and for every 100 females age 18 and over there were 84.1 males age 18 and over.

100.0% of residents lived in urban areas, while 0.0% lived in rural areas.

There were 9,688 households in Newark, of which 21.0% had children under the age of 18 living in them. Of all households, 36.9% were married-couple households, 24.7% were households with a male householder and no spouse or partner present, and 33.5% were households with a female householder and no spouse or partner present. About 30.2% of all households were made up of individuals and 12.1% had someone living alone who was 65 years of age or older.

There were 11,696 housing units, of which 17.2% were vacant. The homeowner vacancy rate was 1.6% and the rental vacancy rate was 9.7%.

Racial composition as of the 2020 census
Race	Number	Percent
White	20,494	67.0%
Black or African American	4,609	15.1%
American Indian and Alaska Native	39	0.1%
Asian	2,774	9.1%
Native Hawaiian and Other Pacific Islander	10	0.0%
Some other race	640	2.1%
Two or more races	2,035	6.7%
Hispanic or Latino (of any race)	2,135	7.0%

=== 2000 census ===
As of the census of 2000, there were 28,547 people, 8,989 households, and 4,494 families residing in the city. The population density was 3,198.6 inhabitants per square mile (1,235.0/km^{2}). There were 9,294 housing units at an average density of 1,041.4 per square mile (402.1/km^{2}). The racial makeup of the city was 87.29% White, 6.00% Black, 0.16% Native American, 4.07% Asian, 0.05% Pacific Islander, 0.86% from other races, and 1.57% from two or more races. Hispanic or Latino people of any race were 2.53% of the population. 16.8% were of Irish, 13.5% Italian, 13.4% German, 10.2% English, and 5.1% Polish ancestry according to Census 2000.

Of the 8,989 households, 20.7% had children under the age of 18 living with them, 40.5% were married couples living together, 7.2% had a female householder with no husband present, and 50.0% were non-families. 27.2% of all households were made up of individuals, and 9.3% had someone living alone who was 65 years of age or older. The average household size was 2.43, and the average family size was 2.91.

In the city, the population was spread out, with 12.5% under the age of 18, 43.6% from 18 to 24, 19.8% from 25 to 44, 14.9% from 45 to 64, and 9.1% who were 65 years of age or older. The median age was 23 years. For every 100 females, there were 85.2 males. For every 100 females age 18 and over, there were 82.3 males.

The median household income was $48,758, and the median family income was $75,188. Males had a median income of $45,813 versus $33,165 for females. The per capita income for the city was $20,376. About 4.1% of families and 20.1% of the population were below the poverty line, including 7.0% of those under age 18 and 7.1% of those age 65 or over.

== Sports ==
Newark is a recognized center of US and international figure skating, mostly due to the many national, world, and Olympic champions (including many foreign nationals) that have trained at the University of Delaware Figure Skating Club (an independent club operating within UD facilities) and at The Pond Ice Rink.

The Delaware 87ers were a professional basketball team that played in the NBA G League (formerly the NBA D-League) as the affiliate of the Philadelphia 76ers. From 2013 until 2018, they played their home games at the Bob Carpenter Center in Newark on the University of Delaware campus. They moved to nearby Wilmington and the 76ers' new Fieldhouse, rebranded as the Delaware Blue Coats.

As of 2022, Newark is home to the headquarters of Combat Zone Wrestling.

== Parks and recreation ==
Newark has over 700 acres (2.8 km^{2}) of parkland and open space, with 36 parks and 21 miles (34 km) of trails.

== Education ==
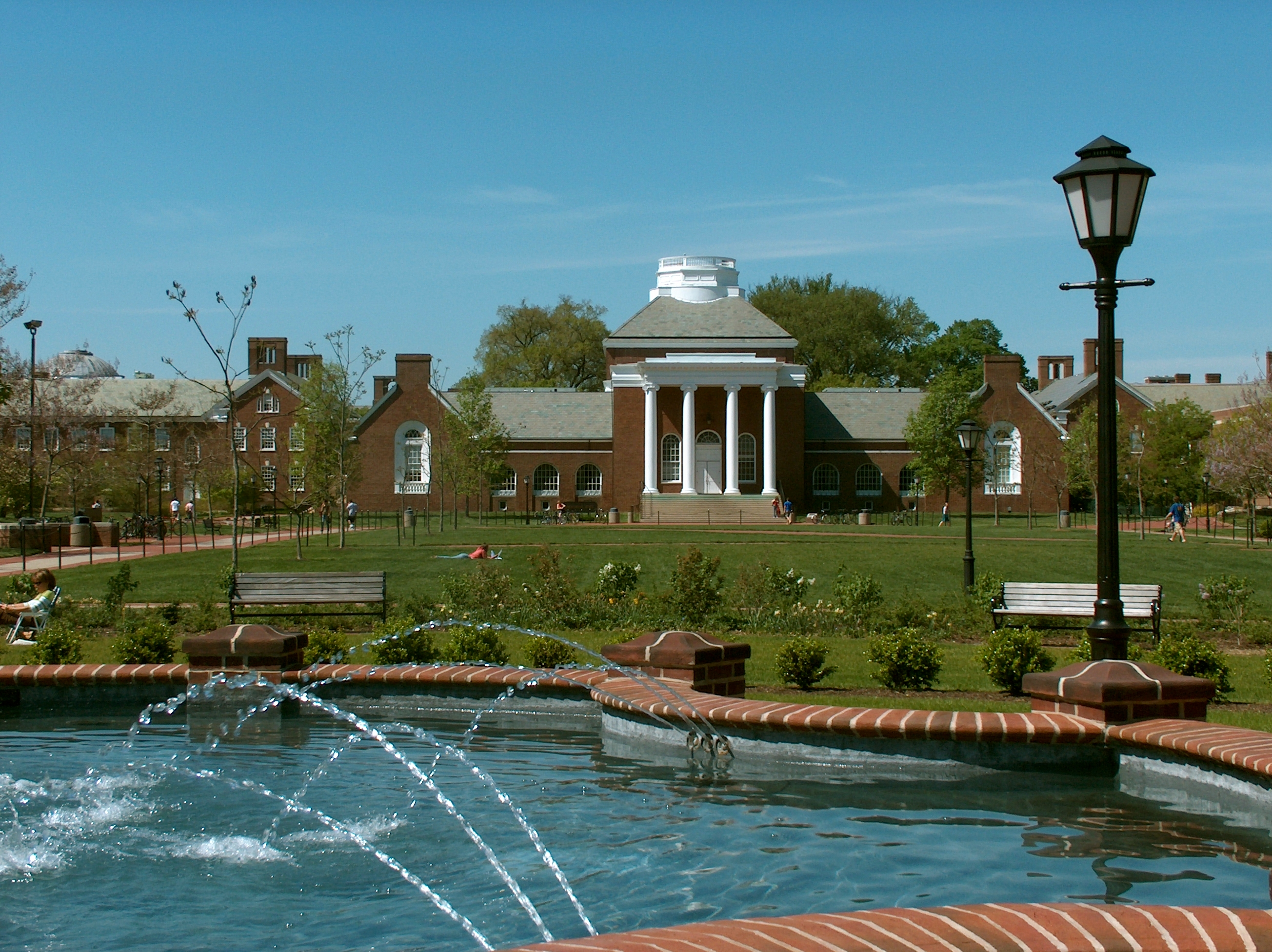
University of Delaware

=== Public schools ===
Public education in Newark is managed by the Christina School District and, for regional vocational schools, the New Castle County Vocational-Technical School District. The Christina School District manages public education for Newark and environs, and also for parts of Wilmington.

Christina School District elementary schools (K-5) serving portions of the city limits include:

- Downes Elementary School
- Maclary Elementary School
- McVey Elementary School
- West Park Place Elementary School
- Brookside Elementary School (in nearby Brookside)

Other schools with Newark addresses:

- Gallaher Elementary School (grades K-5)
- Jennie E. Smith Elementary School (grades K-5)

Shue/Medill Middle School, in an unincorporated area, serves most of the Newark city limits, while small parts are zoned to Gauger-Cobbs Middle School in Brookside. George Kirk Middle School, also in Brookside, previously served sections.

Newark High School serves almost all of the city limits, with small portions in the south zoned to Glasgow High School. Christiana High School (grades 9–12) has a Newark postal address but does not, as of 2008, serve any of the Newark city limits.

Delaware School for the Deaf (grades K-12), operated by the State of Delaware, is in nearby Brookside.

Newark Charter School is a state-chartered school offering grades K-12.

=== History of education ===
Until 1884, Newark's public education system was grades 1-8 only, with Wilmington having the nearest public high school, and with the private Newark Academy being the private option. The Old Newark Comprehensive School served as the first public high school for Newark.

The Newark School District merged into the New Castle County School District in 1978. That district was divided into four districts, among them the Christina district, in 1981.

=== University of Delaware ===
Newark is home to the University of Delaware (UD). The school has programs in a broad range of subjects, but is probably best known for its business, chemical engineering, chemistry and biochemistry programs, drawing from the historically strong presence of the nation's chemical and pharmaceutical industries in the state of Delaware. In 2006, UD's graduate engineering program was ranked number 11 in the nation by The Princeton Review.

== Media ==
=== Radio ===
- WVUD/91.3: University of Delaware

=== Magazine ===
- Newark Life Magazine

=== Newspaper ===
- Newark Post

== Infrastructure ==
=== Transportation ===
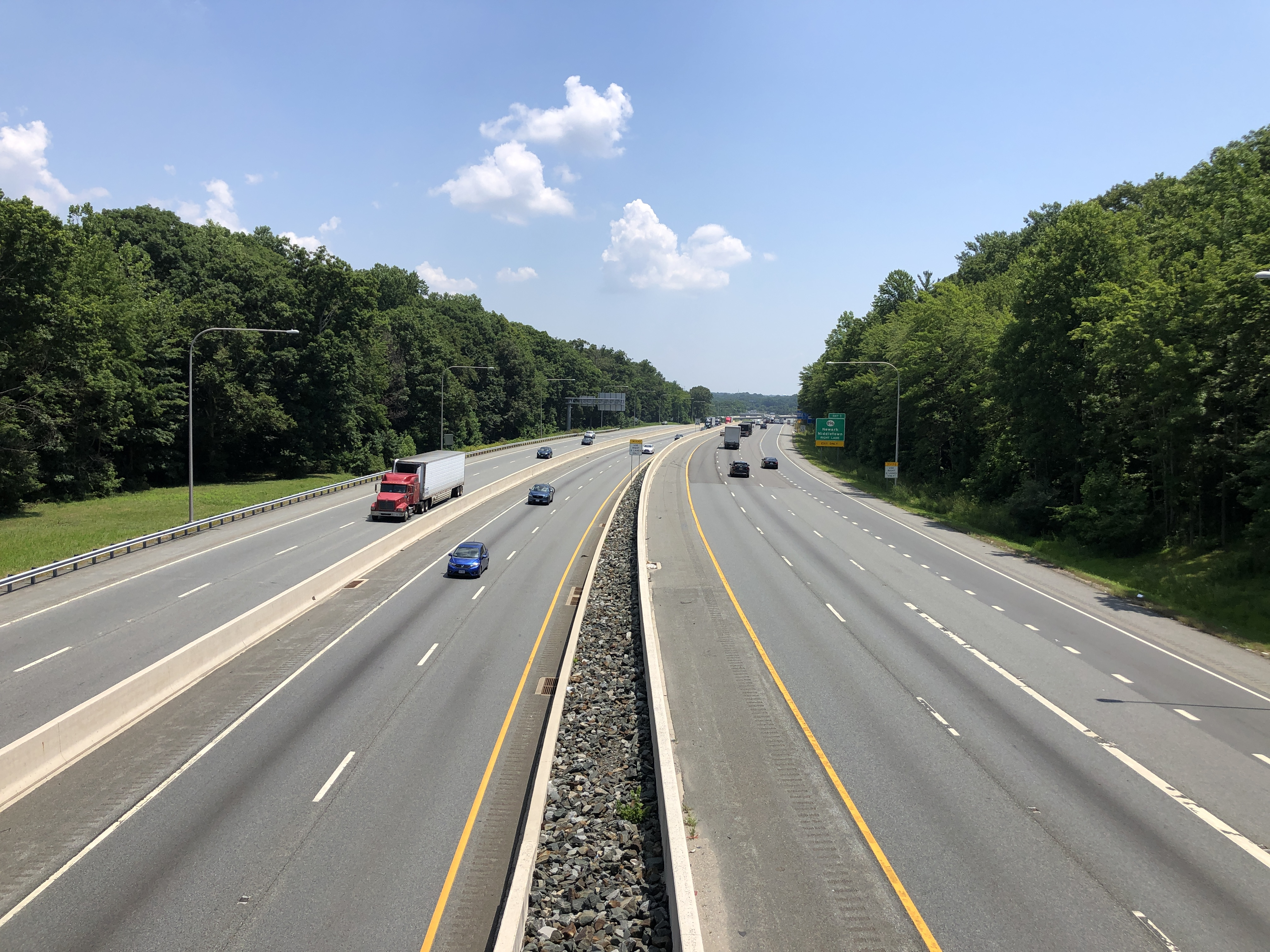
The Delaware Turnpike (Interstate 95) in Newark

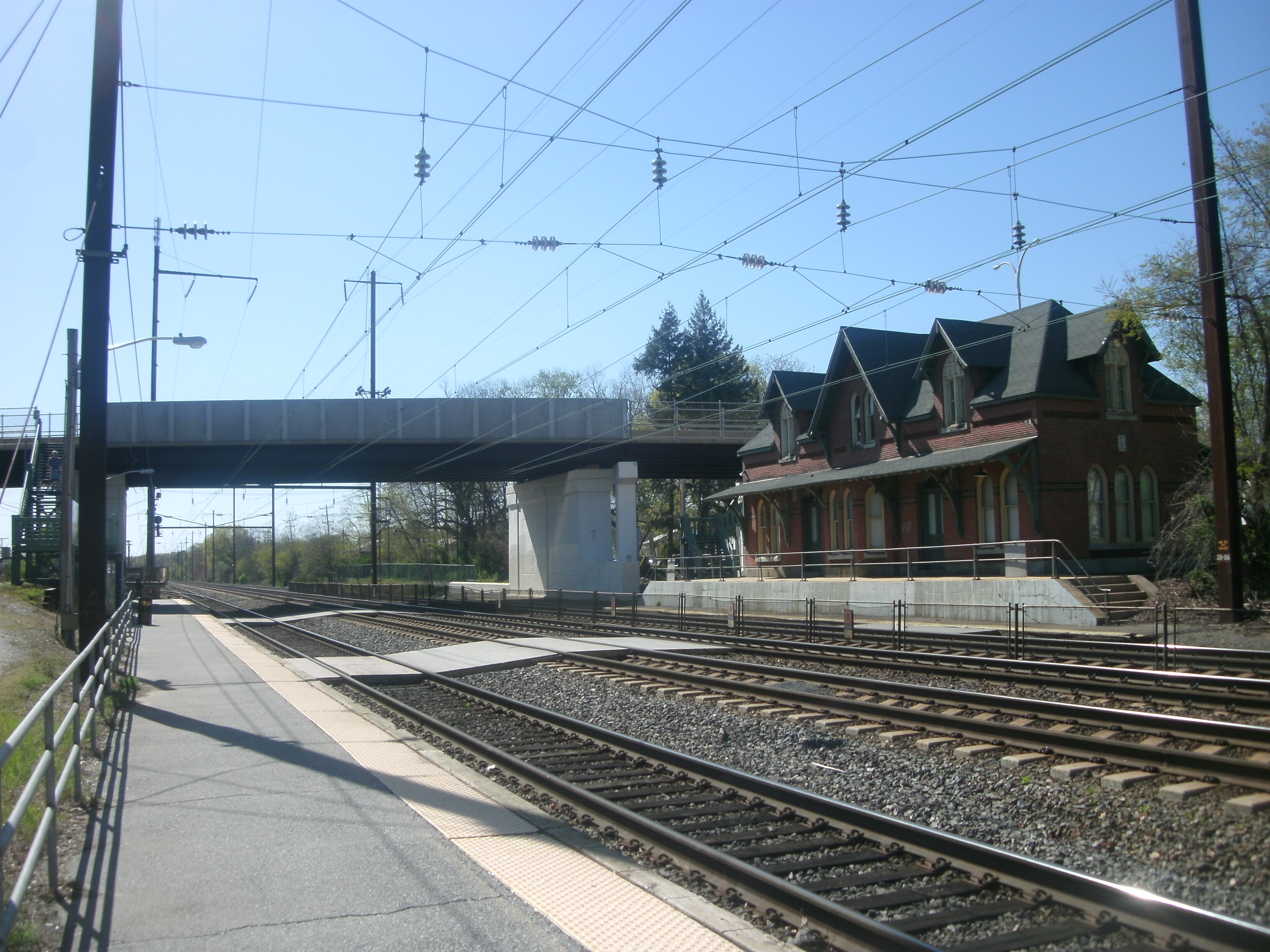
Newark Rail Station, which serves Amtrak and SEPTA Regional Rail

Highways include:

- Interstate 95
- Delaware Route 896
- Delaware Route 72
- Delaware Route 273
- Delaware Route 2
- Delaware Route 279

The closest airport is Wilmington Airport in New Castle County.

Newark Rail Station is serviced by SEPTA and Amtrak on the Northeast Corridor. Norfolk Southern provide freight service and operate the Newark Yard. CSX passes along the Philadelphia Subdivision line.

DART First State and DART Connect provide bus service through the Newark Transit Hub.

=== Utilities ===
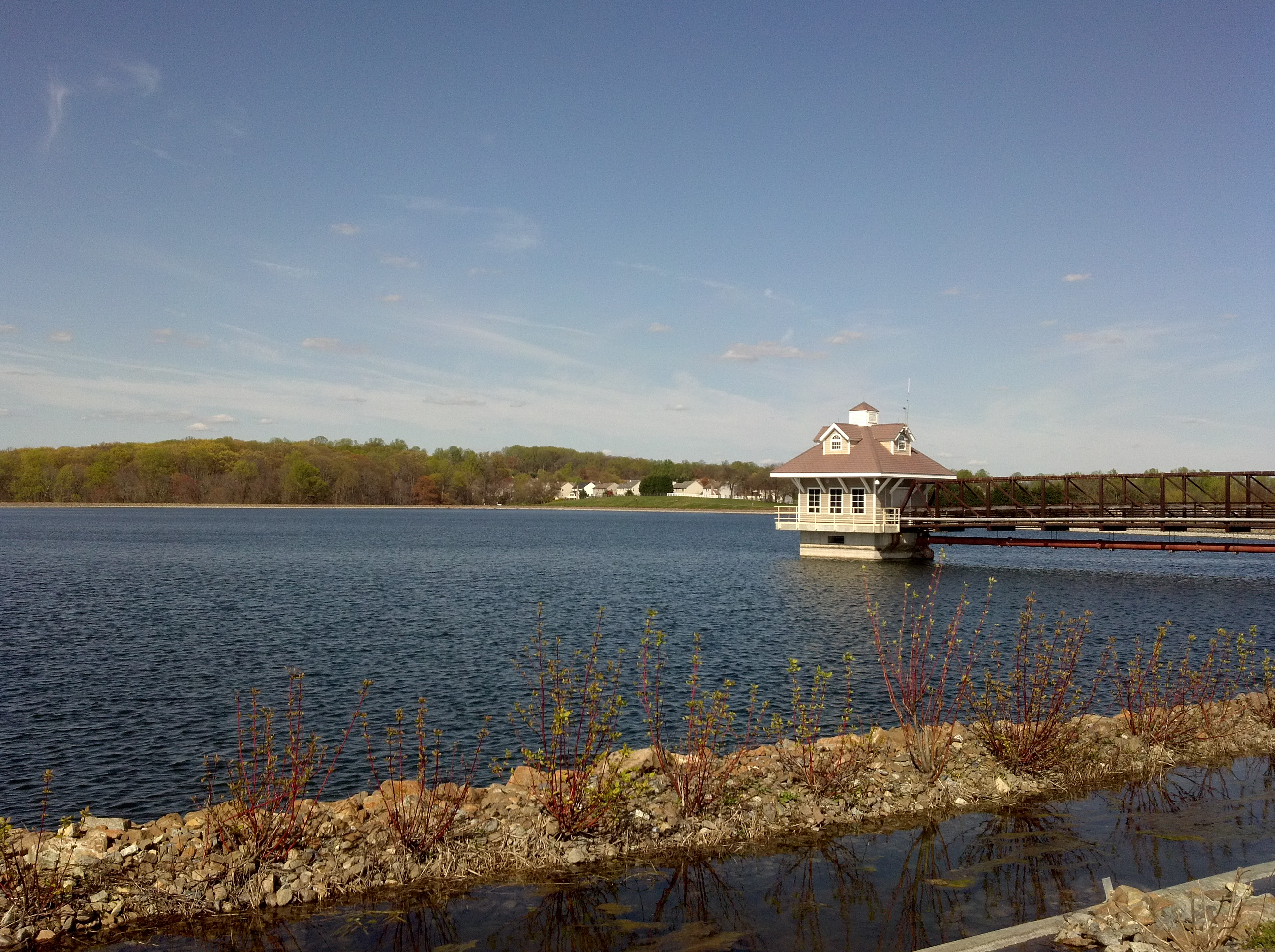
Newark Reservoir, which supplies water to the city

The City of Newark Electric Department provides electricity within the city limits. The city's electric department purchases electricity on the wholesale market, serving about 12,800 customers and maintaining 175 miles (282 km) of electric lines. The electric department is a member of the Delaware Municipal Electric Corporation. The City of Newark Public Works and Water Resources Department provides trash collection, recycling, water, and wastewater service to Newark. Water service is provided to 33,000 customers in Newark, with 91 miles (146 km) of water pipes serving the city. The city's water supply comes from the Newark Reservoir. The city maintains 73 miles (117 km) of sewer lines, with wastewater pumped through the New Castle County system to the Wilmington Regional Wastewater Treatment facility. Natural gas service in Newark is provided by Delmarva Power, a subsidiary of Exelon.

== Notable people ==
- Colin Burns (born 1982), soccer player
- Zara Chavoshi (born 2002), soccer player who represented the Canadian women's national team
- Tarzan Cooper (1907–1980), professional basketball player
- Harry Coover (1917–2011), inventor
- Donte DiVincenzo, current Minnesota Timberwolves basketball player
- Dave Douglas, golfer
- Tom Douglas, award-winning Seattle chef
- Joe Flacco, former University of Delaware football player; current Cleveland Browns quarterback
- Anthony Fontana, professional footballer; current midfielder for the Philadelphia Union
- Wilbert L. Gore, chemical engineer and founder of W. L. Gore & Associates
- David Grinnage, former North Carolina State University football player; former NFL tight end for the Jacksonville Jaguars
- Orien Harris, former University of Miami football player; former NFL defensive end
- Richard Howell, former governor of New Jersey
- K. C. Keeler, former University of Delaware football coach
- Chad Kuhl, Major League Baseball pitcher for the Pittsburgh Pirates
- Jack Markell, former governor of Delaware
- M. A. Muqtedar Khan, Muslim American intellectual and commentator
- Bilal Nichols, former University of Delaware football player; current Chicago Bears defensive end
- Harold "Tubby" Raymond, College Hall of Fame football coach
- Darnell Savage, current Jacksonville Jaguars football player
- George Thorogood, rock and roll musician
- Johnny Weir, U.S. figure skating champion
- Vic Willis, Hall of Fame baseball player
- Madinah Wilson-Anton, candidate for the Delaware House of Representatives
