= Wilmington High School =

Wilmington High School may refer to:

- Wilmington High School (Delaware), former high school in Wilmington, Delaware
- Wilmington High School (Illinois), in Wilmington, Will County, Illinois
- Gardner-South Wilmington Township High School, in Gardner, Illinois
- Wilmington High School (Massachusetts), in Wilmington, Massachusetts
- Wilmington High School (Ohio), in Wilmington, Ohio
- Wilmington Area High School, New Wilmington, Pennsylvania
- Wilmington High School (Vermont), in Wilmington, Vermont
- Phineas Banning High School in Wilmington, Los Angeles

== See also ==
- Wilmington Grammar School for Boys in Dartford, Kent
- Wilmington Grammar School for Girls in Dartford, Kent
- Wilmington Hall High School in Dartford, Kent
