= Brookside, Delaware =

Census-designated place in Delaware, United States

- CDP
- Location in New Castle County and the state of Delaware.

- Location within the state of Delaware Brookside (the United States)
- Coordinates: 39°40′01″N 75°43′37″W
- Country: United States
- State: Delaware
- County: New Castle

Area
  - Total: 3.89 sq mi (10.07 km^{2})
  - Land: 3.88 sq mi (10.05 km^{2})
  - Water: 0.0039 sq mi (0.01 km^{2})
- Elevation: 75 ft (23 m)

Population (2020)
  - Total: 14,974
  - Density: 3,857.6/sq mi (1,489.41/km^{2})
- Time zone: UTC-5 (Eastern (EST))
  - Summer (DST): UTC-4 (EDT)
- Area code: 302
- FIPS code: 10-09850
- GNIS feature ID: 213721

Brookside is a census-designated place (CDP) in New Castle County, Delaware, United States. As of the 2020 census, Brookside had a population of 14,974.

== Geography ==
Brookside is located at 39°40′01″N 75°43′37″W (39.6670561, -75.7268779).

According to the United States Census Bureau, the CDP has a total area of 3.9 square miles (10 km^{2}), all land.

== Demographics ==
Historical population
Census	Pop.	Note	%±
1970	7,856		—
1980	15,255		94.2%
1990	15,307		0.3%
2000	14,086		−8.0%
2010	14,353		1.9%
2020	14,974		4.3%

=== 2020 census ===
As of the 2020 census, Brookside had a population of 14,974. The median age was 36.2 years. 23.1% of residents were under the age of 18 and 14.8% of residents were 65 years of age or older. For every 100 females there were 92.0 males, and for every 100 females age 18 and over there were 89.1 males age 18 and over.

100.0% of residents lived in urban areas, while 0.0% lived in rural areas.

There were 5,623 households in Brookside, of which 33.2% had children under the age of 18 living in them. Of all households, 41.5% were married-couple households, 18.8% were households with a male householder and no spouse or partner present, and 31.7% were households with a female householder and no spouse or partner present. About 26.0% of all households were made up of individuals and 10.3% had someone living alone who was 65 years of age or older.

There were 5,838 housing units, of which 3.7% were vacant. The homeowner vacancy rate was 1.2% and the rental vacancy rate was 4.3%.

Racial composition as of the 2020 census
Race	Number	Percent
White	8,203	54.8%
Black or African American	2,887	19.3%
American Indian and Alaska Native	119	0.8%
Asian	897	6.0%
Native Hawaiian and Other Pacific Islander	3	0.0%
Some other race	1,178	7.9%
Two or more races	1,687	11.3%
Hispanic or Latino (of any race)	2,542	17.0%

=== 2000 census ===
At the 2000 census, there were 14,806 people, 5,465 households and 3,858 families living in the CDP. The population density was 3,787.7 inhabitants per square mile (1,462.4/km^{2}). There were 5,645 housing units at an average density of 1,444.1 per square mile (557.6/km^{2}). The racial makeup of the CDP was 77.35% White, 15.03% African American, 0.32% Native American, 2.61% Asian, 0.07% Pacific Islander, 2.22% from other races, and 2.40% from two or more races. Hispanic or Latino of any race were 5.59% of the population.

There were 5,465 households, of which 35.9% had children under the age of 18 living with them, 49.9% were married couples living together, 15.4% had a female householder with no husband present, and 29.4% were non-families. 22.1% of all households were made up of individuals, and 6.8% had someone living alone who was 65 years of age or older. The average household size was 2.68 and the average family size was 3.15.

Age distribution was 26.8% under the age of 18, 9.6% from 18 to 24, 33.2% from 25 to 44, 20.5% from 45 to 64, and 9.9% who were 65 years of age or older. The median age was 34 years. For every 100 females, there were 96.3 males. For every 100 females age 18 and over, there were 91.9 males.

The median household income was $50,107, and the median family income was $55,077. Males had a median income of $37,040 versus $29,494 for females. The per capita income for the CDP was $19,527. About 5.6% of families and 7.4% of the population were below the poverty line, including 9.4% of those under age 18 and 9.0% of those age 65 or over.

== Education ==
Christina School District operates area district public schools.

Zoned elementary schools serving Brookside include Brookside Elementary School and Jennie E. Smith Elementary School. Brookside is divided between the boundaries of Gauger/Cobbs Middle School, Kirk Middle School, and Shue-Medill Middle School. Brookside is divided between the zones of Christiana High School and Newark High School.

Previously Grades 5-6 were assigned to schools in Wilmington: Bayard and Stubbs.

Delaware School for the Deaf is in Brookside.
