= Cristina Henríquez =

American writer

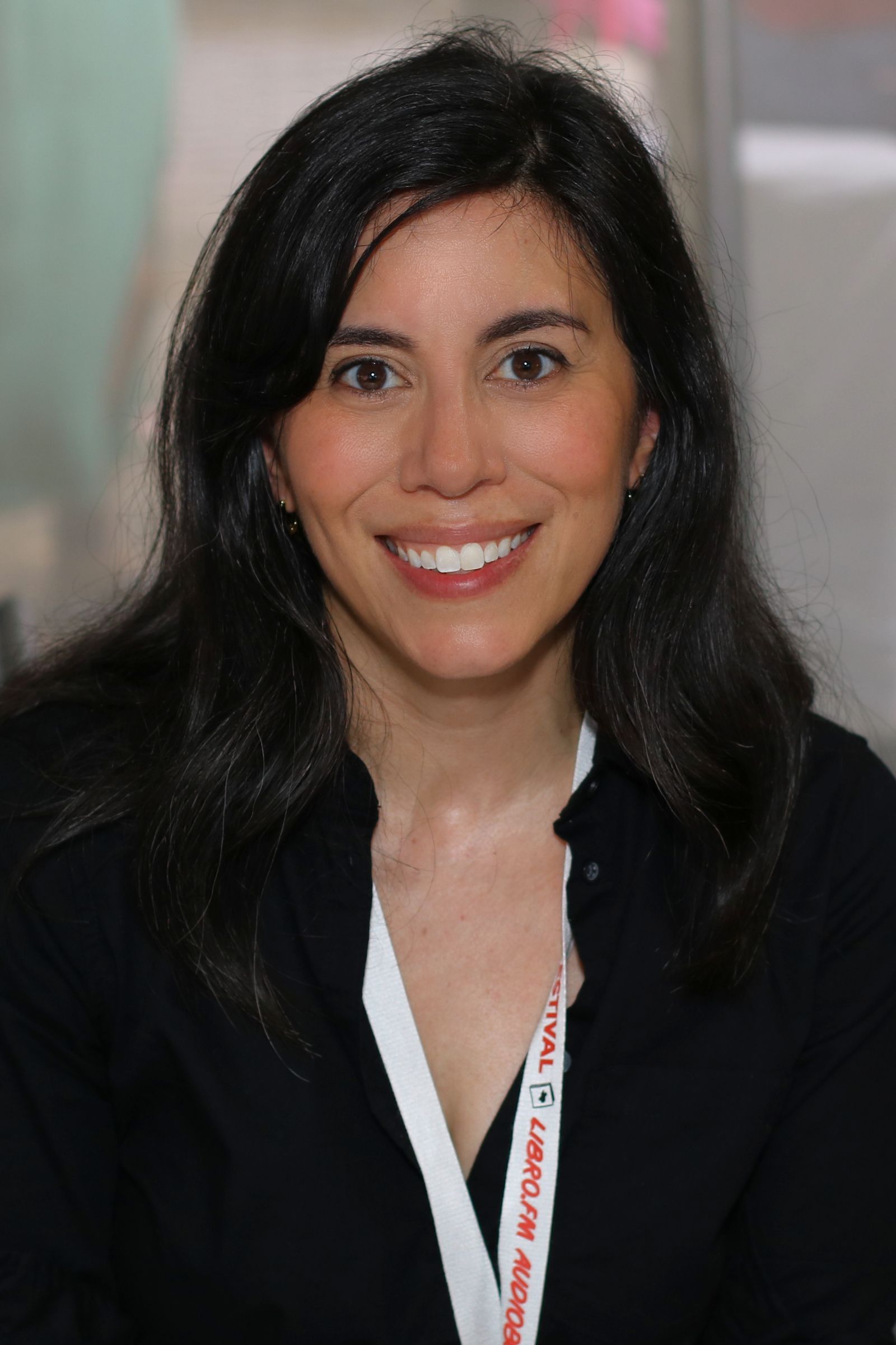
- Henríquez at the 2024 Texas Book Festival.
- Born: 1977 (age 48–49); Delaware
- Education: Northwestern University; Iowa Writers' Workshop (MFA)
- Occupation: Writer
- Notable work: The Book of Unknown Americans
- Website: cristinahenriquez.com

Cristina Henríquez is an American author best known for her 2014 novel The Book of Unknown Americans.

== Early life ==
Henríquez's father is from Panama and immigrated to the U.S. in 1971 for college; her mother is from New Jersey and worked in Delaware public schools as a translator. Henríquez was born in Delaware and attended school in the U.S., but spent summers in Panama. She did not speak Spanish as a child and so on visits "had no choice but to sit there and observe" dynamics she later evoked in her writing, particularly the warmth and joy of family life among her father's relatives.

In a New Yorker essay, Henríquez has said "the honest-to-goodness and embarrassing story" of how her interest in writing began "is that I started writing in high school, and I did it for a boy." Uninterested in her frequently-professed affections for him, the boy in question gave her a journal and suggested that she instead write down everything she wanted to tell him and give them to him at the end of a year. She began the journal writing to him,

"But it didn't take long before I found I was writing for myself, and for the sheer enjoyment of the act of writing. I was hooked. I sat down at the end of each day and scribbled page after page, experimenting with new ways of saying things, and reveling in a feeling of absolute freedom."

Ardor for writing replaced the unrequited affection. "As soon as I ran out of space in that journal, I started another, and then another after that. I haven't stopped writing since."

== Education ==
Henríquez attended Northwestern University; she majored in English, graduating in 1999. She then earned an MFA from the Iowa Writers' Workshop. She has described her time in the Iowa program as "a great experience", highly valuable both for validating her writing as well as developing her skills: "I have all my notebooks...and I still open them every once in a while to find something that Chris Offutt said about dialogue or something that Sam Chang said about structure or that Marilynne Robinson said about subordinate clauses. I could not have gotten that specific knowledge anywhere else." At the same time, responding to Junot Diaz's criticism of the "unbearable too-whiteness" MFA programs, Henríquez notes that while in Iowa, she often spent her own time writing about Panama (which later became the setting for her first two books), but submitted only stories about the United States and American characters to her classes, subsequently wondering whether this choice stemmed from some sense that in the MFA setting, the stories on Panama "weren't going to be as acceptable, or that maybe they were going to be taken in a different way than the stories that were set in the United States and that I was trying in a way to inoculate myself."

== Career ==
Henríquez's fiction has appeared in various literary magazines. In 2006 she published in The New Yorker.

=== Books ===
Her first book was a collection called Come Together, Fall Apart. Containing eight short stories and a novella, Come Together, Fall Apart was published on April 4, 2006 by Riverhead. Reviewing the collection in The New York Times, Thomas Beller said, "Henríquez's fiction provides intense close-ups of young Panamanians whose lives are in enormous flux...Always she appears to be probing for rare moments of grace."

Her debut novel, The World in Half, was published by Riverhead three years later, April 16, 2009. The novel follows a young woman from Chicago who takes a trip to Panama to pursue family ties there. In The Washington Post, Jonathan Yardley described the book as an "engaging if slight first novel...sure to strike a familiar and affecting note with the many other residents of this country who are trying to reconcile divided identities as well as divided loyalties."

The Book of Unknown Americans, Henríquez's second novel, was published in 2014 with Knopf. The Daily Beast named it the 2014 novel of the year.

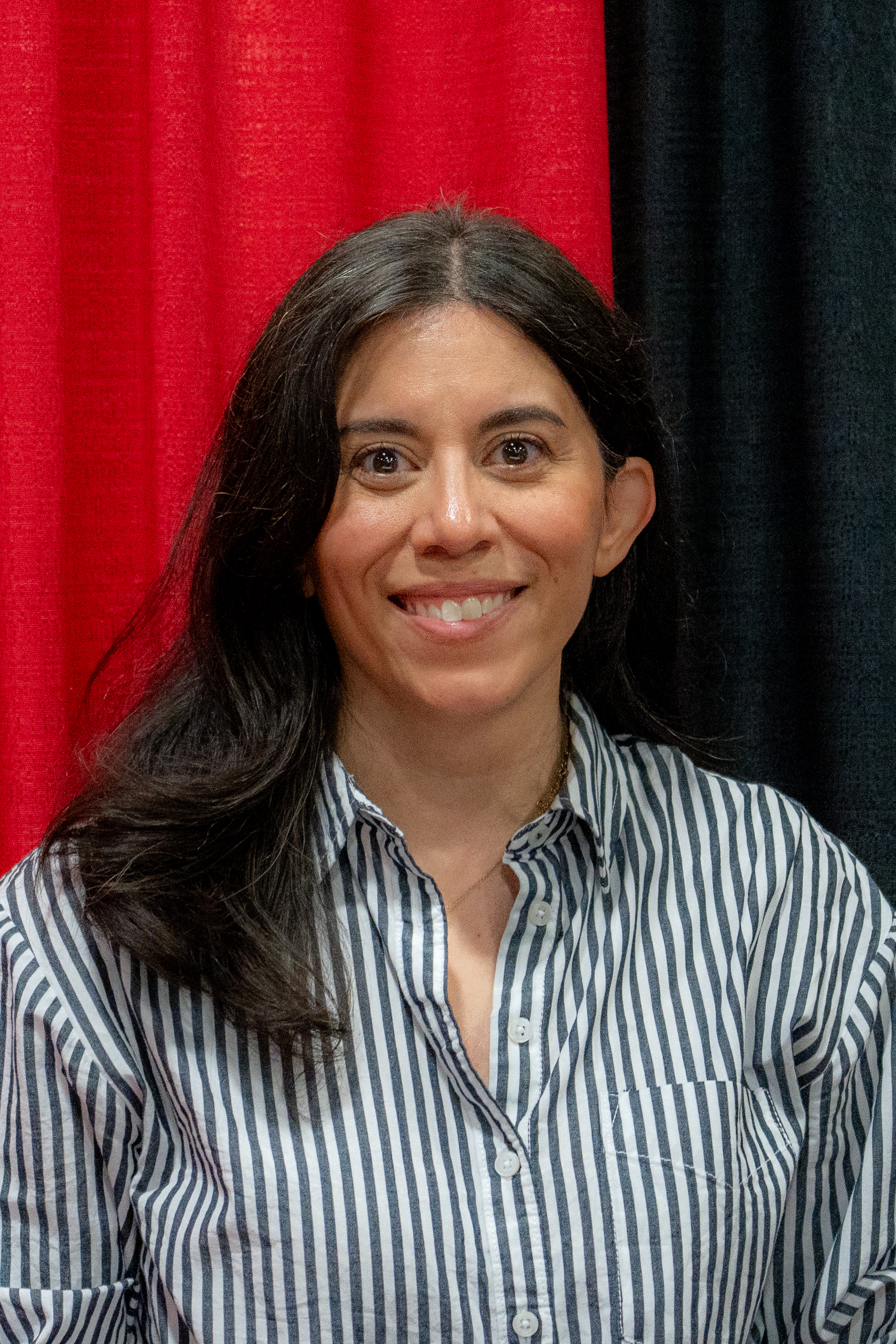
Henríquez at the National Book Festival 2025

Henríquez's third novel, The Great Divide, was chosen as a Read with Jenna book club selection for March 2024 along with Sandra Cisneros's The House on Mango Street for the five-year anniversary of the book club.

=== Anthologies ===
Henríquez has also contributed to the anthologies This Is Not Chick Lit (Random House, 2006) and Thirty Ways of Looking at Hillary: Reflections by Women Writers (Harper, 2008).

== Personal life ==
Henríquez lives in Chicago, Illinois.

== Awards and honors ==
- 21st Century Award, Chicago Public Library Foundation, 2024.
- 2020 Fiction judge for the National Book Awards
- Recipient of the Alfredo Cisneros Del Moral Foundation Award

== Bibliography ==
- Come Together, Fall Apart (Riverhead, 2006)
- The World in Half (Riverhead, 2009)
- The Book of Unknown Americans (Knopf, 2014)
- The Great Divide (Ecco Press, 2024)
