= New Castle County School District =

School district in Delaware, United States

New Castle County School District (NCCSD) was a school district located in New Castle County, Delaware, United States. It was headquartered in Wilmington.

== History ==
It was created in 1978 as a merger of 11 school districts, under the aegis of a racial desegregation plan. It was created due to Evans v. Buchanan. It absorbed Alexis I. DuPont School District, Alfred I. DuPont School District, Claymont School District, Conrad School District, De Le Warr School District, Marshallton-McKean School District, Mount Pleasant School District, New Castle-Gunning Bedford School District, Newark School District, Stanton School District, and Wilmington School District, which all merged as per an order from a U.S. district court.

In 1978 it had about 63,450 students, which meant it had about 50% of the total number of students enrolled in public schools in the state. A major strike occurred in October of that year.

In 1981, the student count was 55,000. On July 1, 1981, the district was scheduled to be dissolved, divided into four parts. The new districts were: Brandywine School District, Christina School District, Colonial School District, and Red Clay School District.
