= Christina School District =

School district in Delaware, United States

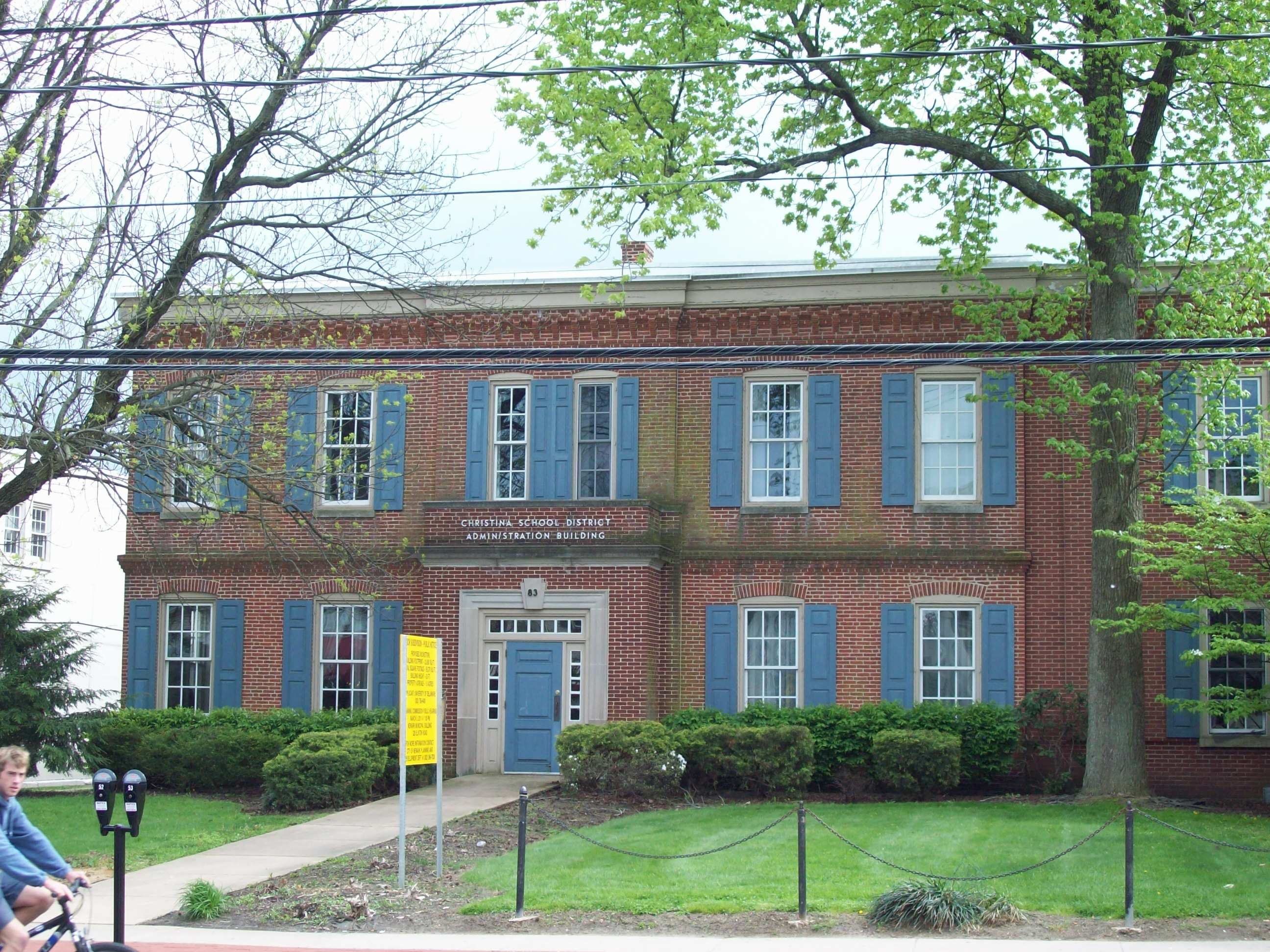
Old Newark Comprehensive School, the previous district administrative headquarters

The Christina School District is a Delaware public school district located primarily in the Newark area and a non-contiguous portion of Wilmington. The district office is located on the property of Glasgow High School in New Castle County, with Dr. Deirdra Joyner as the current superintendent.

The district includes Newark, Brookside, central portions of Wilmington, most of Glasgow, about half of Bear, half of North Star, and parts of Pike Creek and Pike Creek Valley.

== History ==
The district was created on July 1, 1981, from the New Castle County School District after legislation passed in 1980 permitted the State Board of Education to divide the New Castle County School District into smaller districts. At the time all students in grades 5 and 6 went to schools of those grade levels, all of them in the city of Wilmington, to satisfy a State of Delaware desegregation directive that came into place in 1978.

From 1984 to 1988 its student population increased by 2,000 and it was the largest school district in Delaware. From 1987 to 1988 the student population increased by 500. Due to the growth, in 1988 two elementary schools were under construction, with completion scheduled in 1989, and the district enacted a $29.6 million program to build two additional schools and expand four. The district aimed to build capacity in Wilmington as it anticipated more grade 5-6 students enrolling. Additionally, it had one active school and one school not yet open south of Baltimore Pike despite having 1,877 students in grades Kindergarten through 3rd grade.

Lillian M. Lowery served as Superintendent of the Christina School District from 2006 until her appointment as Secretary of the Delaware Department of Education in 2009, and was subsequently appointed as Superintendent of the Maryland State Department of Education in 2012.

The Redding Consortium studied the educational landscape in Wilmington. In 2024 the organization proposed removing the part of the Christina School District covering sections of the City of Wilmington, an exclave of the district, from the district itself and giving it to another school district. The Delaware House of Representatives and the Delaware Senate supported a resolution that supported this change.

== Demographics ==
In 2014, of the Delaware school districts, Christina had the most African-American students. That year, it operated four elementary schools in the Wilmington city limits. Together, those schools had 1,410 students, with 74 of them being white.

== Schools ==
=== High schools ===
- Christiana High School (Unincorporated Area)
- Glasgow High School (Glasgow address, not in the CDP)
- Newark High School (Newark)

=== Middle schools ===
- Christiana Middle School Honors Academy (Unincorporated Area)
- Gauger-Cobbs Middle School (Brookside)
- George V. Kirk Middle School (Brookside)
- Shue-Medill Middle School (Newark)

=== Elementary/middle schools ===
1-8 schools:

- Maurice Pritchett Sr. Academy (Wilmington) - It was previously elementary only and known as the Bancroft School. It began adding middle school grades in 2019.
- The Bayard School (Wilmington)
  - The original building opened in 1925. The current school opened in 1973.

=== Elementary schools ===
- Brader (Henry M.) Elementary School
  - Opened fall 1989
- Brookside Elementary School (Brookside)
- Downes (John R.) Elementary School (Newark)
- Gallaher (Robert S.) Elementary School (unincorporated area)
- Jones (Albert H.) Elementary School (unincorporated area)
- Keene (William B.) Elementary School (Glasgow)
- Leasure (May B.) Elementary School (Bear)
  - Opened as Eden School and taught 1-8 but later reduced to grades 1-6 when NHS began accepting grades 7–8. A 1934 fire gutted the school and classes were temporarily moved to Lodge Hall; the new facility opened in 1935. The school received its current name, which honors teacher Elizabeth May Brown Leasure, in 1970, and the current facility opened in 1998.
- Maclary (R. Elisabeth) Elementary School - Chapel Hill (Newark address)
- Marshall (Thurgood) Elementary School (unincorporated area)
- McVey (Joseph M.) Elementary School (unincorporated area)
  - In 1988 it was the only elementary school that had all of its attendance boundaries located in a single feeder for each subsequent level, so its students stayed together until grade 12.
- Oberle (William A.) Elementary School (Bear)
  - The school, then Porter Road Elementary School, opened in 2009, and it changed to its current name in 2011. Its namesake was a member of the Delaware House of Representatives.
- Smith (Jennie E.) Elementary School (Newark)
- West Park Place Elementary School (Newark)
- Wilson (Etta J.) Elementary School (Pike Creek Valley)

=== Early childhood education ===
- Christina Early Education Center
  - It adopted school uniforms in the 1990s. In 1998 52% of the students reported having a positive reception to wearing uniforms, 60.2% of parents argued that uniforms were less expensive than non-uniform clothes, and 65% of teachers stated that uniforms improved the classrooms.
- Pulaski Early Education Center
- Stubbs Early Education Center

=== Other schools/programs ===
- Brennen School - Delaware Autism Program
- Delaware School for the Deaf
- Douglass School
- Middle School Honors Academy at Christiana High School
- Networks School for Employability Skills
- Christina R.E.A.C.H.
- Sarah Pyle Academy

== Former schools ==
- Dr. Charles Richard Drew Elementary School (Wilmington) - It was on the east side of Wilmington. In 1988 the district proposed expansion. In the 1990s the school, as Drew-Pyle, adopted school uniforms. In 1998 76% of parents stated that it makes getting dressed for school easier and 65% stated that the cost is lower with uniforms. Above 50% of the students wanted to revert to a non-uniform policy. All of the teachers expressed support in keeping uniforms.
- Elbert-Palmer Elementary School (Wilmington) - It was in Southbridge, Wilmington. It closed in 1981, but in 1988 was under renovation and being expanded so it could reopen in fall 1989.
- Casimir Pulaski Elementary School (Wilmington) - It was in Hedgeville. In 1988 the district proposed expansion.
- Pyle Elementary School (Wilmington)
- Frederick Douglass Stubbs School (Wilmington) - It was in Canby Park. It was a center for handicapped students, but in 1988 they were being mainstreamed into traditional schools so Stubbs could be expanded and converted into a regular school.

== Facilities ==
The current headquarters are in Glasgow High School, in an unincorporated area of New Castle County, near the Glasgow census-designated place. The school district intended for the move to be temporary as it could not acquire nor develop the property of its choosing. The district announced in October 2021 that the headquarters would go there.

Its previous administrative offices were in the Drew Educational Support Center in Wilmington. It was formerly the Dr. Charles Richard Drew Elementary School. It moved from this facility because a new school was to be built on the property. The namesake was Charles Richard Drew. Drew himself never developed direct connections with the State of Delaware. The district honored Drew in a ceremony as he was an African-American with developments in science. Materials related to him were left in a time capsule at the building, buried in 1953 and opened in 2022.

It previously had its administrative headquarters in Newark. It moved from these offices in 2005. These administrative offices were formerly housed in the Old Newark Comprehensive School.

== Dress code ==
By 1998 three schools: the early childhood center, Shue-Medill Middle School, and Drew-Pyle Elementary School had adopted school uniforms, prompting other districts to consider it, though in 1998 the number of public schools in Delaware with uniforms was below 20.

== Controversy ==
The district has been criticized for its strict interpretation of its "no weapons" policy. In 2009 it suspended a six-year-old Cub Scout for taking a camping utensil to school and wanted to send the child to its alternative placement school for 45 days as punishment. In 2007 the District expelled a seventh-grade girl for using a utility knife to cut windows out of a paper house for a class project. In 2011, a seventh-grader was suspended and almost expelled for dyeing her hair.
