= Glasgow High School (Delaware) =

Location
- 1901 South College Avenue; Newark, Delaware 19702; United States
- 39°37′48″N 75°44′30″W

Information
- Type: Public secondary
- Established: 1973 (53 years ago)
- School district: Christina School District
- CEEB code: 080116
- Principal: Harold "Butch" Ingram
- Teaching staff: 47.00 (FTE)
- Grades: 9–12
- Enrollment: 907 (2023–2024)
- Student to teacher ratio: 19.30
- Campus type: Suburban
- Colors: Red and gold
- Athletics conference: Blue Hen Conference - Flight A
- Mascot: Dragons
- Website: glasgow.christinak12.org

Glasgow High School (GHS), located in unincorporated New Castle County, Delaware, is one of the three traditional public high schools in Christina School District. GHS serves portions of Glasgow, Bear, Newark, and Wilmington.

The facility includes the school district headquarters, a placement intended to be temporary.

== History ==
GHS, opened in fall 1973, was built to accommodate more than 2,000 students and to reduce strain on the two other schools in the district. The school's building was designed by Wilmington architects Wason, Tingle & Brust.

The current headquarters of the school district are in this school property. The school district intended for the move to be temporary as it could not acquire nor develop the property of its choosing. The district announced in October 2021 that the headquarters would go there. The district chose Glasgow because of the space, former technical school facilities, could house the workers.

== Athletics ==
GHS is part of the Delaware Interscholastic Athletic Association and the Blue Hen Conference (Division II).

== Notable alumni ==
- Marc Egerson, former Georgetown University, University of Delaware, NBL, and Israeli Basketball Premier League player
- Emmanuel Savary, competitive ice skater
