= Delaware Legislative Hall =

State capitol building of the U.S. state of Delaware

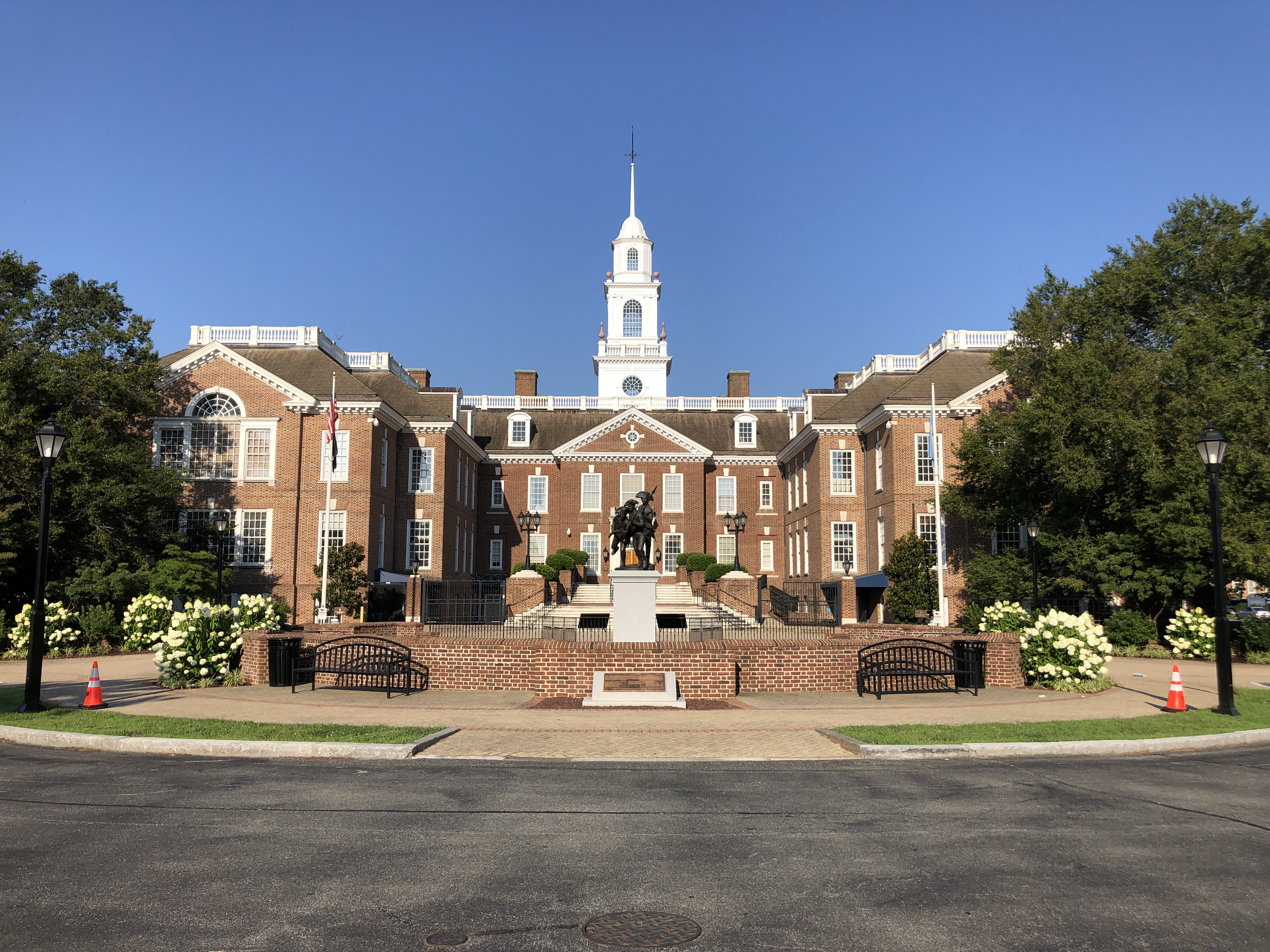
- The Delaware General Assembly meets in the Legislative Hall in Dover, built 1931-1933, with wings added 1965-1970, 1994.
- Interactive map of the Delaware Legislative Hall area

General information
- Architectural style: Colonial Revival
- Location: 411 Legislative Avenue; Dover, Delaware, United States
- Coordinates: 39.157307°N 75.519722°W
- Construction started: 1931; 95 years ago
- Completed: 1933; 93 years ago
- Client: State of Delaware
- Owner: State of Delaware

Design and construction
- Architects: E. William Martin; Norman M. Isham

The Delaware Legislative Hall is the state capitol building of Delaware. Located in the state capital city of Dover on Legislative Avenue, it houses the chambers and offices of the Delaware General Assembly. It was designed in the Colonial Revival architecture style by E. William Martin and Norman M. Isham, and built 1931–1933, with wings added in 1965–1970 and 1994.

== Architects ==
The building was built of red brick with white wooden trim, designed in the Colonial Revival style by E. William Martin and Norman M. Isham, under the direction of the State Buildings and Grounds Commission, created by Governor C. Douglass Buck in 1931 during the Great Depression. Initially the commission was awarded to Isham, but his appointment was protested by Alfred Victor Du Pont (on the grounds that Isham was not a resident of Delaware); therefore, local architect Martin was brought in. The influence of Isham is clear when one notes the resemblance of many architectural details to Old Colony House in Newport, Rhode Island, a building which Isham had also restored in 1932.

== History and structure ==
=== Old State House ===
The original capitol of Delaware was the State House (now known as the Old State House), located on The Green in Dover. It was commissioned originally by Kent County as the Kent County Court House, and was constructed from 1787 to 1791, when it became the State House. Kent County and the state government shared the building until 1873, when the Kent County government relocated. The State House was used until the completion of Legislative Hall.

Today, the Old State House has been restored to its 18th-century appearance and is now a museum that includes the site of a former courtroom and the former chambers of the state legislature. The House chamber contains portraits by Thomas Sully of Commodore Jacob Jones and Commodore Thomas Macdonough, of the United States Navy, Delaware heroes who served in the Barbary Wars and the War of 1812.

=== Legislative Hall ===
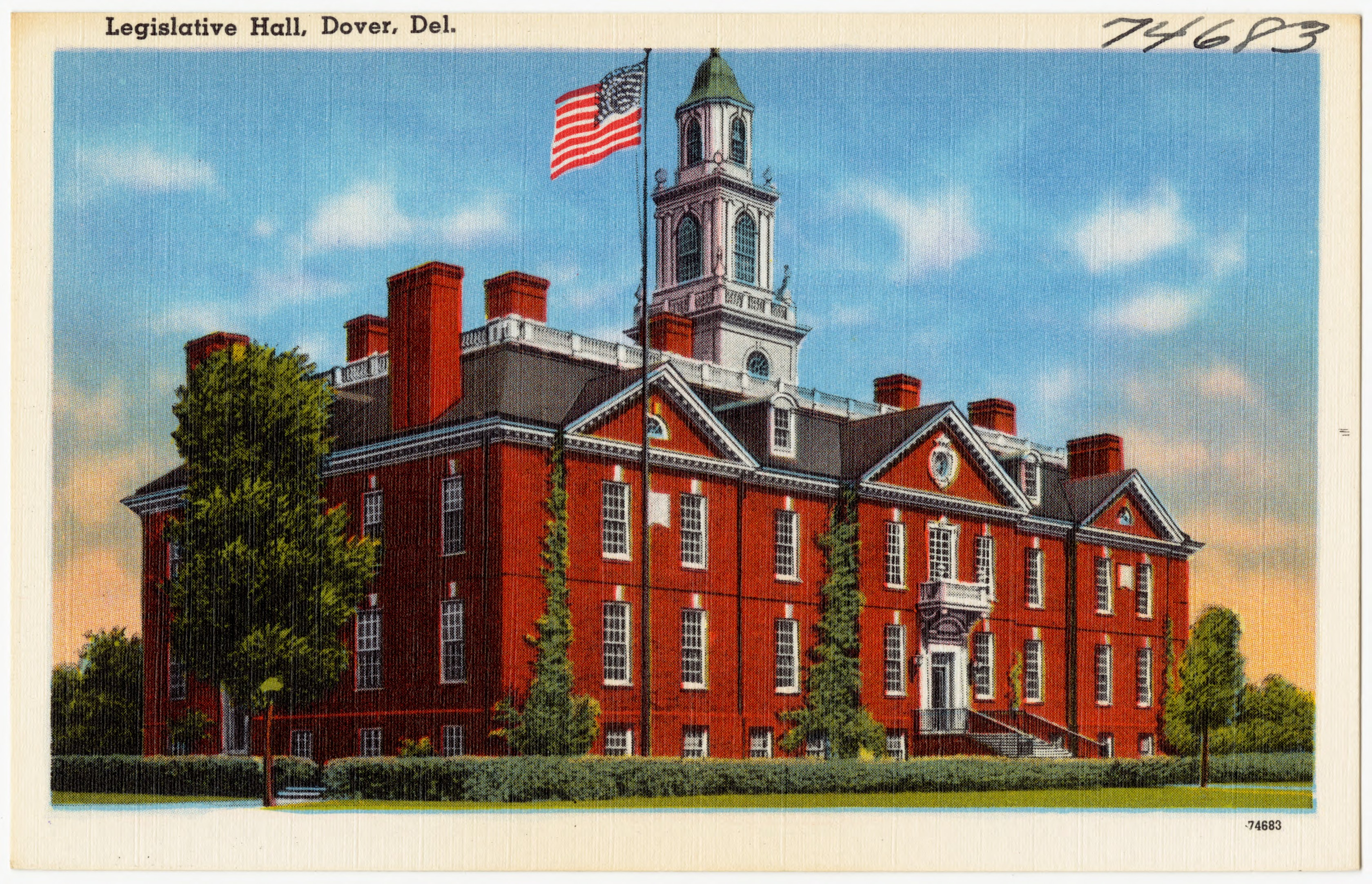
Legislative Hall, postcard image prior to 1945

Legislative Hall is opposite the Old State House on the mall. The structure was completed and dedicated in 1933. From 1965 to 1970, flanking north and south wings were added on the sides of the building, giving each member of the Assembly an office in addition to a desk in one of the legislative chambers. The architect George Fletcher Bennet of Dover designed the expansion.

Two more wings, providing more office space for legislators and staff as well as hearing and caucus rooms, were added to the east side / rear of the building in 1994. This expansion was designed by the Wilmington-based firm The Architects Studio. In addition, the entire interior of Legislative Hall was renovated in a three-phase project during the next three years during the summers of 1995, 1996 and 1997, including refurbishment of both the House and Senate chambers as well as the lobby, cafeteria, and many offices. This project was designed by the Wilmington firm Moeckel Carbonell Associates.

In addition to the chambers of the Delaware House of Representatives and Senate, the Legislative Hall also includes space used by the General Assembly's two nonpartisan staff agencies, the Division of Research and the Office of the Controller General, as well as offices for the Governor and Lieutenant Governor while the General Assembly is in session.

Legislative Hall is the home of the Hall of Governors, which includes portraits of all but one of Delaware's past governors. The building also houses other portraits, including of political and military figures such as James Frank Allee, James A. Bayard the elder, Bradford B. Barnes, James A. Bayard Jr., Henry Clay Conrad, Richard S. Cordrey, Samuel Francis Du Pont, Vera Gilbride Davis, J. Allen Frear, Jr., Herman Holloway Sr., Calvin R. McCullough, Eli Saulsbury, John Wales, John Jay Williams, Presley Spruance, Willard Saulsbury, Sr., and Willard Saulsbury, Jr.

== See also ==
- Delaware lunar sample displays
- List of state and territorial capitols in the United States
