= Jack Varsalona =

Jack P. Varsalona

3rd President of Wilmington University
- In office July 1, 2005 – June 30, 2017
- Preceded by: Dr. Audrey K. Doberstein
- Succeeded by: Dr. LaVerne Harmon

Personal details
- Born: Jack P. Varsalona; October 29, 1948 (age 77) Trenton, New Jersey, U.S.
- Education: University of Delaware
- Profession: College administrator, Academic
- Website: www.wilmu.edu/president.aspx

Jack P. Varsalona (born October 29, 1948) is an American professor, college administrator, and the third president of Wilmington University in New Castle, Delaware.

== Early life and career ==
Born in 1948 in Trenton, New Jersey, Varsalona attended the University of Delaware, where he received his undergraduate, graduate, and doctoral degrees. A lifelong educator and administrator, Varsalona served as the principal of Wilmington's Ursuline Academy private school from 1975 through 1978; served as the Director of Development at the University of Delaware from 1978–81; and served as the key education advisor in the cabinet of former Delaware governor Pete du Pont. During this time, he was a frequent adjunct professor, as well as an administrator, at what was then Wilmington College in New Castle, Delaware.

Varsalona's career as a professor at Wilmington University (formerly Wilmington College) began during his tenure with Gov. DuPont. He became the university's executive vice president for academic and student affairs in 1987, and was quickly promoted to the role of executive vice president and provost of the College. In 2005, Varsalona was named the third president of Wilmington University, following the retirement of long-time president Dr. Audrey K. Doberstein.

Varsalona's tenure at Wilmington University has seen dramatic changes in the student body and the school's overall presence. Two years into his tenure, in 2007, Varsalona oversaw the transition of Wilmington College into Wilmington University. During his more than a decade as the university's President, Varsalona has nearly tripled enrollment and has guided the university toward expansion to new campuses, as well as partnerships with existing community colleges, in Delaware, New Jersey, and Maryland.

In 2016, Varsalona announced his retirement, which occurred on June 30, 2017. He was succeeded by Dr. LaVerne Harmon.

Dr. Varsalona currently serves as the Treasurer of board of directors of the Arts Garage of Delray Beach, Florida.

== Advocacy of independent higher education ==
In 2009, Varsalona, along with the presidents of Goldey-Beacom College, Wesley College, and the Delaware College of Art & Design, formed the Delaware Association of Independent Colleges and Universities, of which he served as President. According to Varsalona, the association was formed to "promote job growth, educate citizens about the advantages of private higher education and give students more options." Members of the association also agree to share resources with each other when and where necessary. Since the formation of the organization in 2009, Varsalona has served as its chairman.

== Awards for Education and Community Leadership ==
During his tenure as President of Wilmington University, Varsalona was awarded the inaugural Rev. Roberto Balducelli Appreciation Award, given to Italian-American community leaders who use their position to promote Italian culture and values in the communities they serve. Varsalona also received the Community Leadership Advocate award on behalf of the Goodwill of Delaware and Delaware County. The award was given to Varsalona in appreciation of Wilmington University's scholarship programs, many of which directly benefitted employees and volunteers involved with the local chapter of the Goodwill.

- Recipient of the Melvin Jones Fellow Award from the Lions Club International (2007)
- Recipient of the Rev. J.H. Beauchamp Volunteer of the Year Award on behalf of Goodwill Industries (2009)
- Chair – Delaware Association of Independent Colleges and Universities (2009)
- Recipient of the Dr. Wallace M. Johnson Award for Community Service from the New Castle County Chamber (2009)
- Presented with a Senate Tribute and Senate Resolution from the Delaware State Senate (2009)
- Recipient of the Freedom Fund Award from the NAACP (2009)
- Recipient of the Muriel E. Gilman Champion Award from the Fresh Start Scholarship Foundation (2011)
- Recipient of the Rev. Roberto Balducelli Appreciation Award from the St. Anthony of Padua Catholic Church (2014) (2015)
- Recipient of the Community Leadership Advocate of the Year Award on behalf of Goodwill of Delaware and Delaware County (2015)
- Presented with a House of Representatives Tribute and Resolution from the Delaware House of Representatives (2015)
- Honored by the Prince of Piedmont Lodge #475 for his many contributions to the Italian Community and the State of Delaware (2016)
- Delaware State Chamber of Commerce John H. Taylor, Jr. Leadership in Education Award (2016)
- Wilmington University names first building on its Brandywine Valley campus location, "Jack P. Varsalona Hall" (2019)
- Member of Mensa International since 1986.
