= Delmarva Power & Light Building =

Historic building in Wilmington, Delaware

- U.S. National Register of Historic Places
- U.S. Historic district – Contributing property
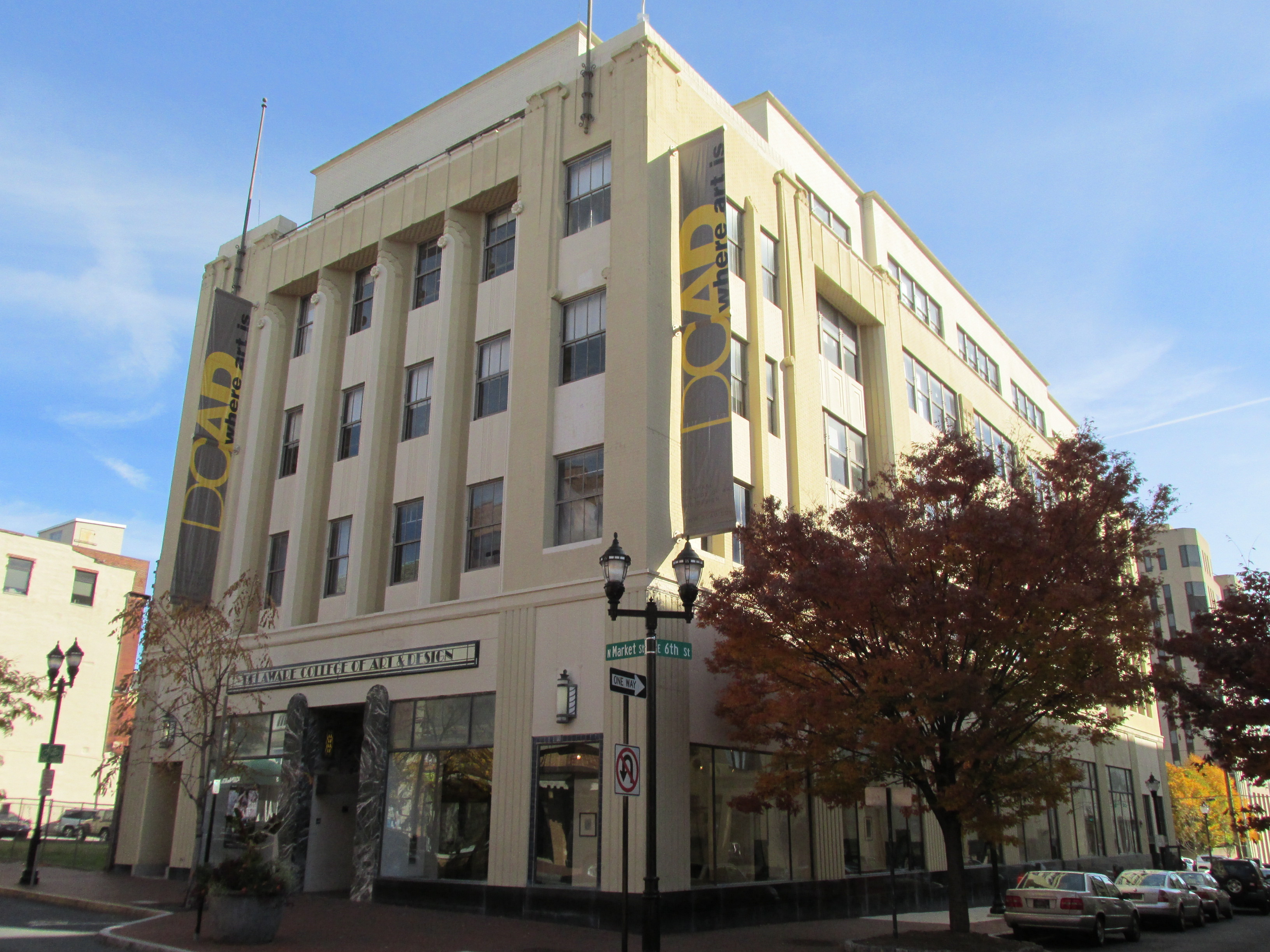
- Building from the intersection of Market & 6th

- Location within Delaware Location within the United States
- Location: 600 North Market Street, Wilmington, Delaware 19801
- Coordinates: 39°44′31″N 75°33′00″W
- Built: 1932, 1955
- Built by: United Engineers and Contractors, Inc.
- Architect: Brown & Whiteside
- Architectural style: Art Deco
- Website: dcad.edu
- Part of: Downtown Wilmington Commercial Historic District (ID10000079)
- MPS: Market Street MRA (64000105)
- NRHP reference No.: 85000149

Significant dates
- Designated NRHP: January 30, 1985
- Designated CP: March 24, 2017

The Delmarva Power & Light Building, also known as the DCAD Building, is a historic office building in downtown Wilmington, Delaware. The former headquarters of Delmarva Power & Light (DP&L) is listed on the National Register of Historic Places.

== History ==
DP&L decided to build the headquarters in 1931 which was completed the subsequent year. While the original building was four stories, it was engineered with a fifth floor in mind which was eventually added in 1954. In 1972, the company moved their headquarters to 8th & King and the building sat vacant for a decade before Chase Manhattan Bank leased the space.

In 1997, the newly created Delaware College of Art and Design (DCAD) took over the building from the bank to use as their main academic building with classrooms, studio space, and offices. In 2021, DCAD sold their adjacent resident hall and used some of the proceeds to refurbish the interior.

In 2024, the school announced that they would permanently close down. The Buccini Pollin Group, a major Wilmington developer, later purchased the building for $3.5 million.

== Architecture ==
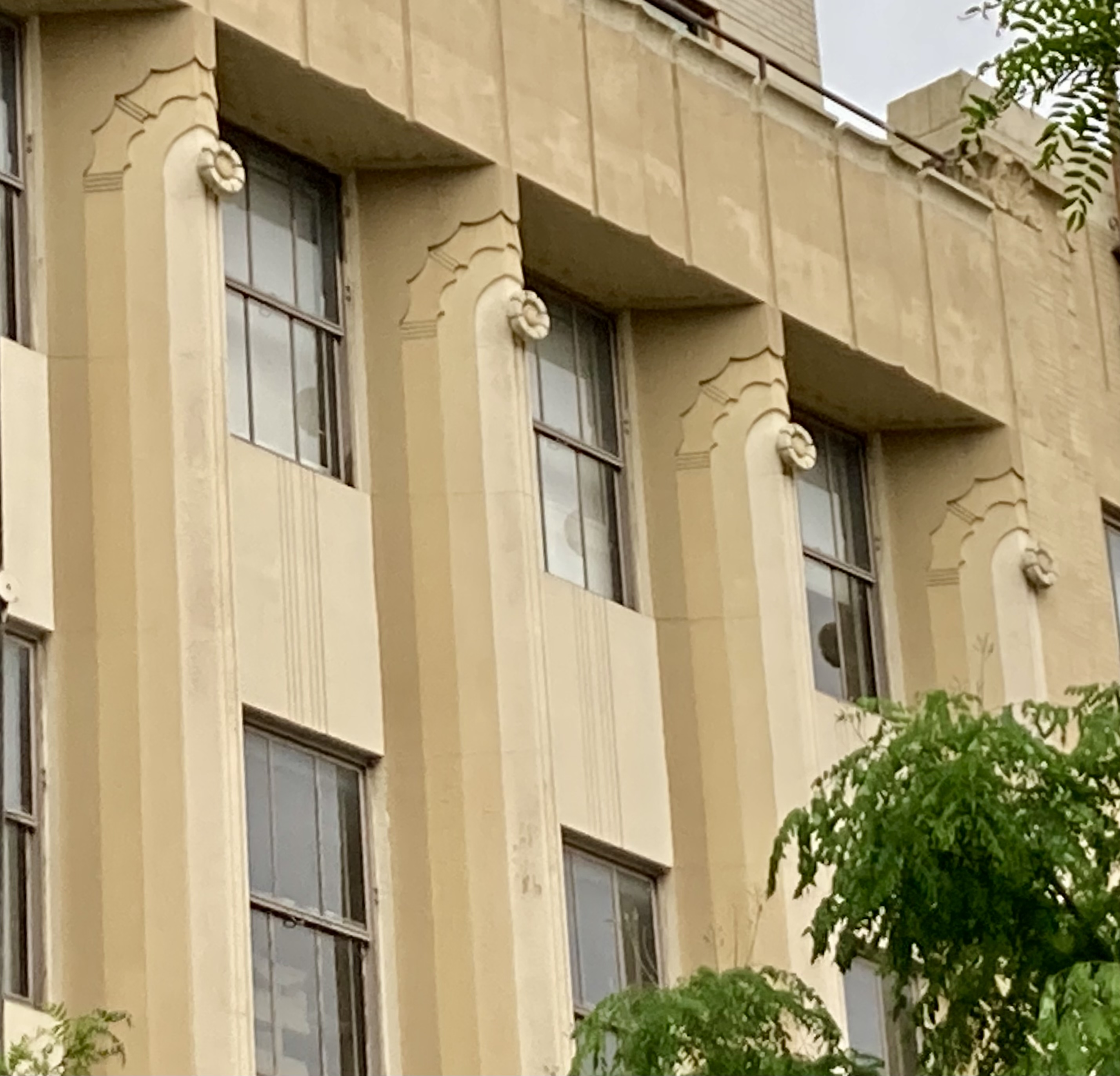
The pilasters rising to the fourth-floor parapet

The Art Deco building faces Market Street with an Indiana limestone facade consisting of six bays. Granite piers frame the main entrance which is below a transom containing a lightning bolt motif.

The first floor sits on a black granite base. The second through fourth floors have four triangular fluted limestone pilasters with floral capitals. The fourth-floor has a parapet featuring stylized cresting in limestone. The fifth floor is a plain brick penthouse. The 6th Street side of the building is less ornate, consisting largely of painted brick.

== See also ==
- National Register of Historic Places listings in Wilmington, Delaware
