= Wilmington YMCA (Wilmington, Delaware) =

- U.S. National Register of Historic Places
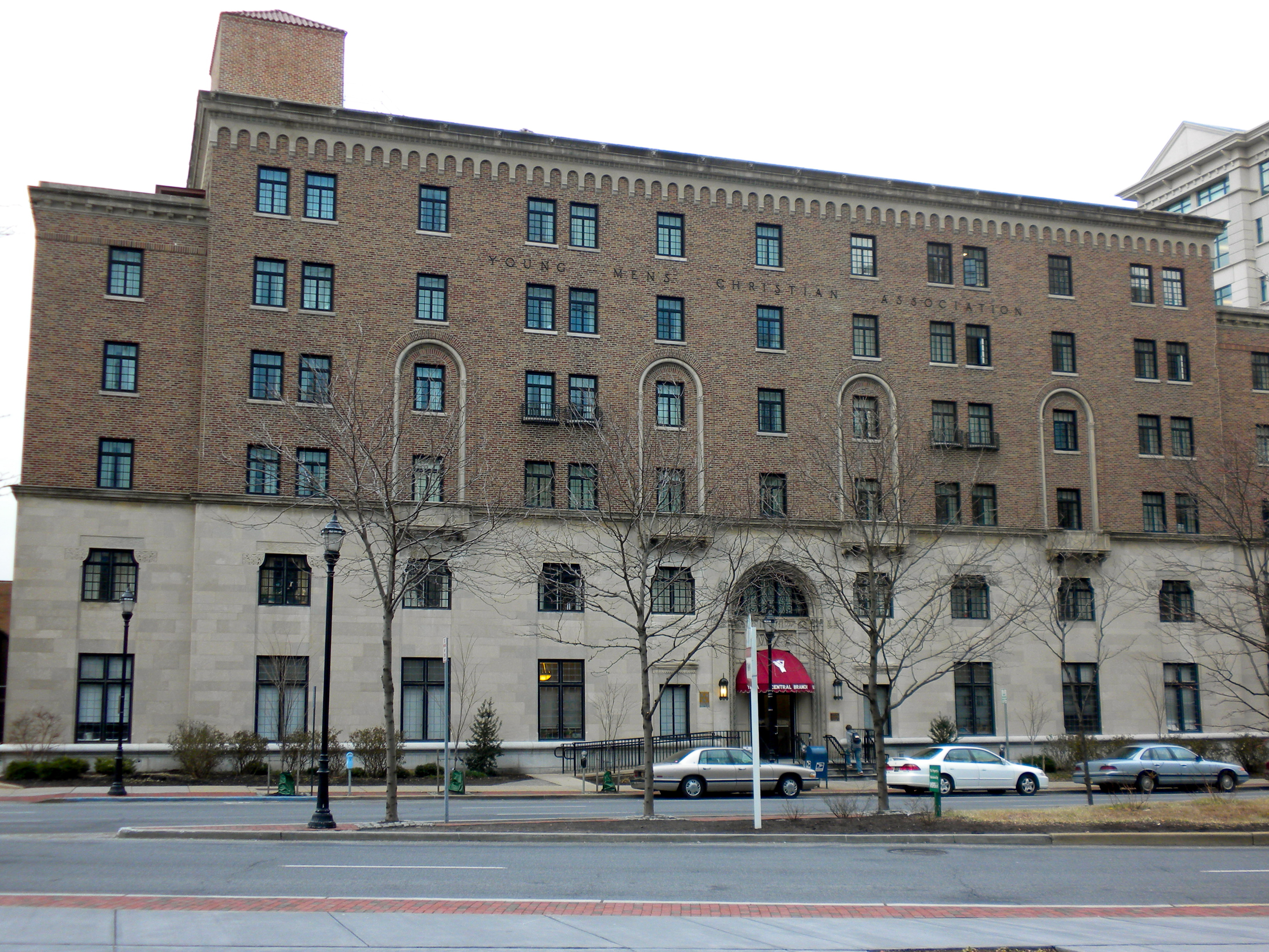
- Central YMCA Wilmington, January 2010

- Location within Delaware Location within the United States
- Location: 501 W. 11th St., Wilmington, Delaware
- Coordinates: 39.748569°N 75.551356°W
- Area: 2 acres (0.81 ha)
- Built: 1929
- Built by: William M. Francis Company
- Architect: Brown & Whiteside
- Architectural style: Mission/spanish Revival
- NRHP reference No.: 02000035
- Added to NRHP: February 20, 2002

Wilmington YMCA, also known as Wilmington Central YMCA or just Central YMCA, is a historic YMCA building located in Wilmington, New Castle County, Delaware. It was built in 1929, and is a six-story, red brick and Indiana limestone building in a Spanish Colonial Revival style. It consists of a center six-story, nine-bay main block flanked by five-story, one-bay wings, setback slightly from the main facade.

It was added to the National Register of Historic Places in 2002.

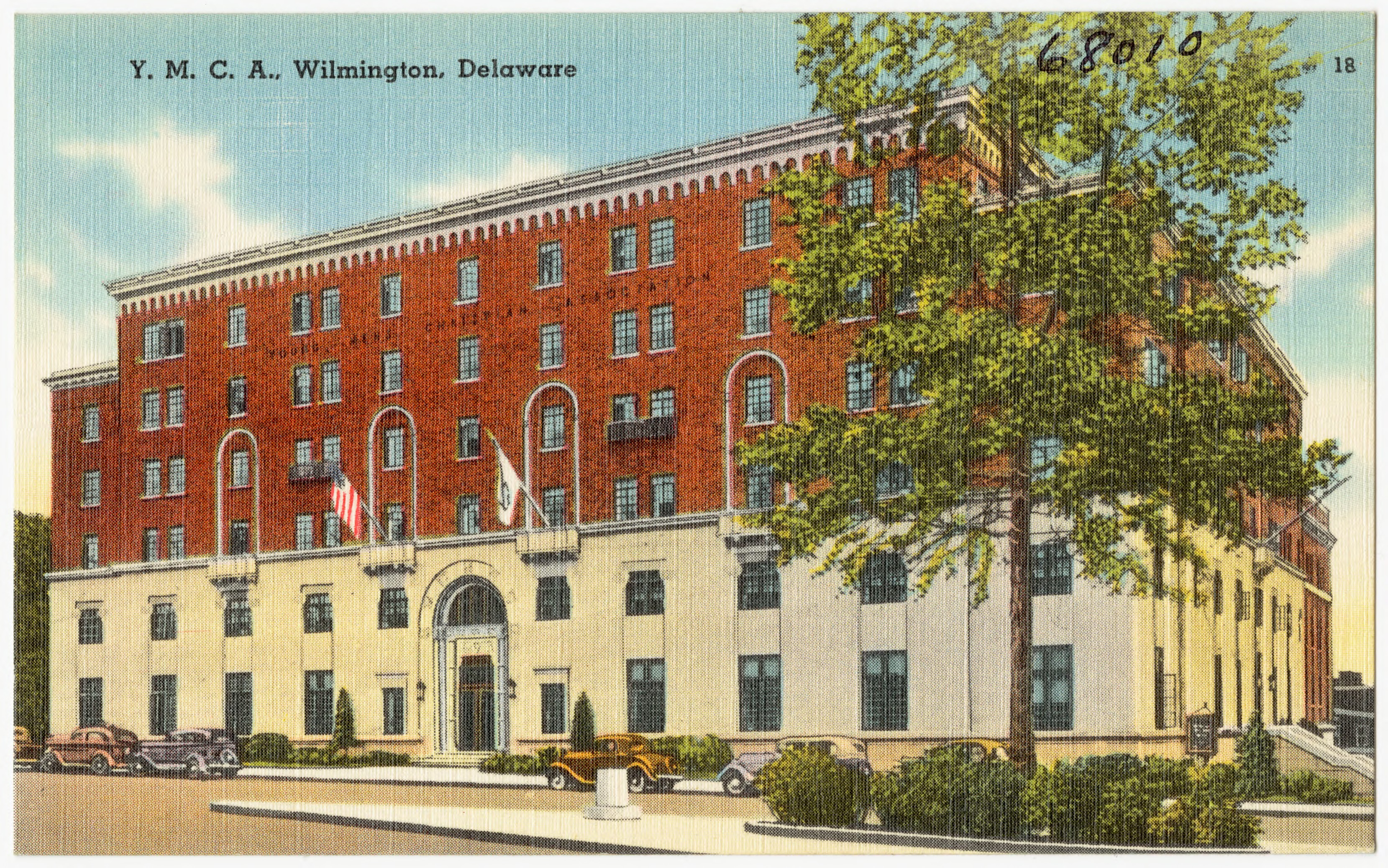
Antique postcard (circa 1930-1945)
