= Jean Dahlgren =

American artist and designer

Academic background
- Education: MA, State University of New York at Oswego; MFA, 2001, Marywood University
- Website: jeandahlgren.com

Jean Garvey Dahlgren is an American artist and designer. She is the third overall president and first female president of the Delaware College of Art and Design.

== Early life and education ==
Dahlgren completed her Master of Fine Arts degree from Marywood University through their low-residency program "Get Your Master’s with the Masters." She also completed her Master's degree from the State University of New York at Oswego.

== Career ==
Upon completing her formal education, Dahlgren began teaching at The Sage Colleges in 1988 and eventually became the program coordinator for Sage’s graphic design program. In these roles, she spearheaded the development of the four-year program in graphic design and served as coordinator for Sage’s graphic and media design program. During her tenure at Sage, Dahlgren also served on the leadership team for the College Board/Educational Testing Service Advanced Placement in Studio Art and on the Upstate NY Board of the American Institute of Graphic Arts. In July 2016, Dahlgren was named Dean of Sage College of Albany.

In 2018, Dahlgren left Sage to become the third president of the Delaware College of Art and Design. Following her appointment, she was named on Delaware Business Times's 2019 People to Watch List. Under Dahlgren's leadership, DCAD saw declined enrollment and ultimately shut down right before Memorial Day weekend in 2024.
