= E. William Martin =

American architect (1891–1977)

- Born: November 2, 1891; Inverarnan, Scotland
- Died: December 10, 1977 (aged 86); Newark, Delaware
- Occupation: Architect
- Awards: Fellow, American Institute of Architects (1945)
- Practice: E. William Martin; Martin & Jeffers; Martin & Wason

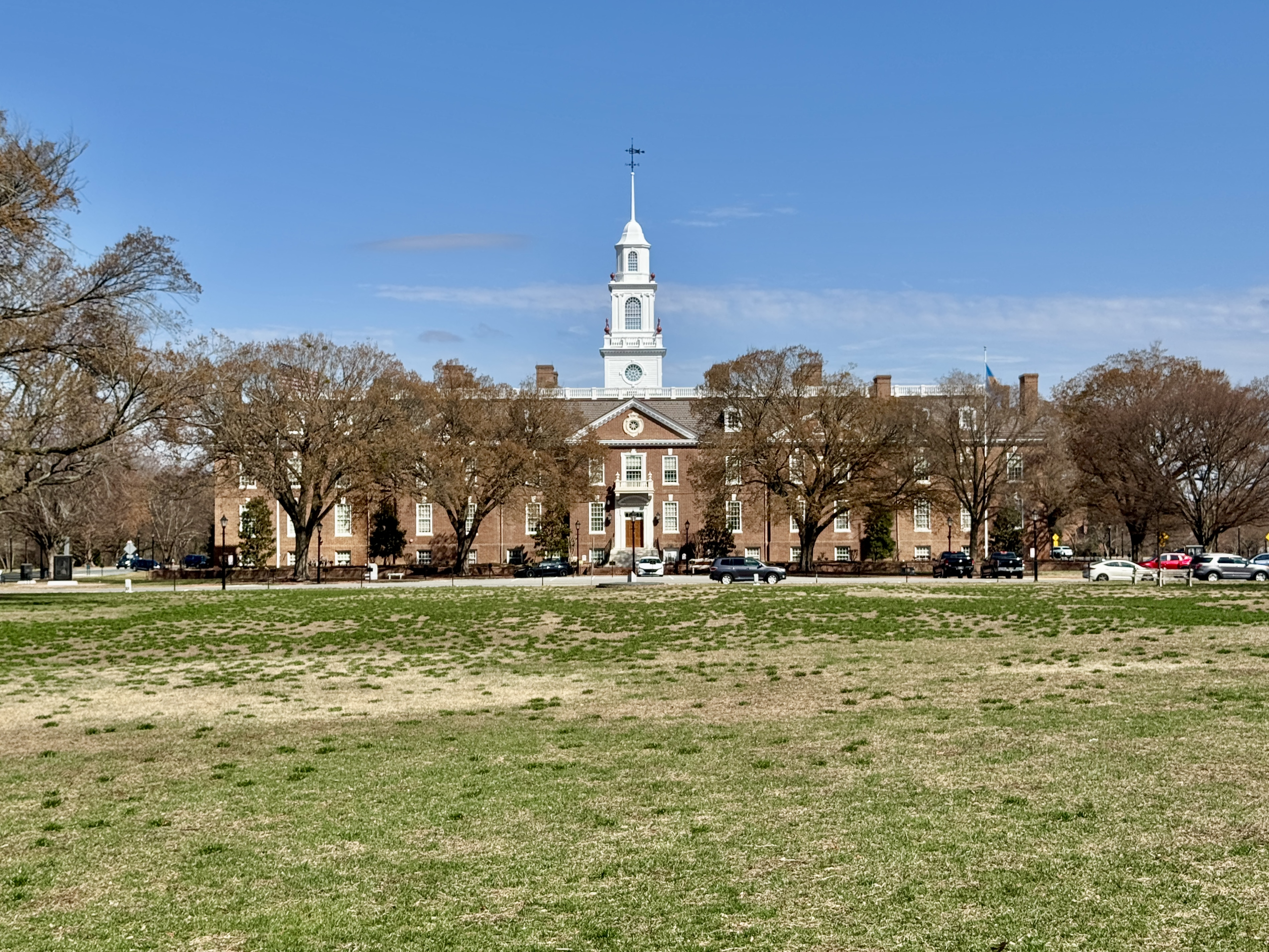
The Delaware Legislative Hall in Dover, designed by E. William Martin with consulting architect Norman M. Isham and completed in 1932.

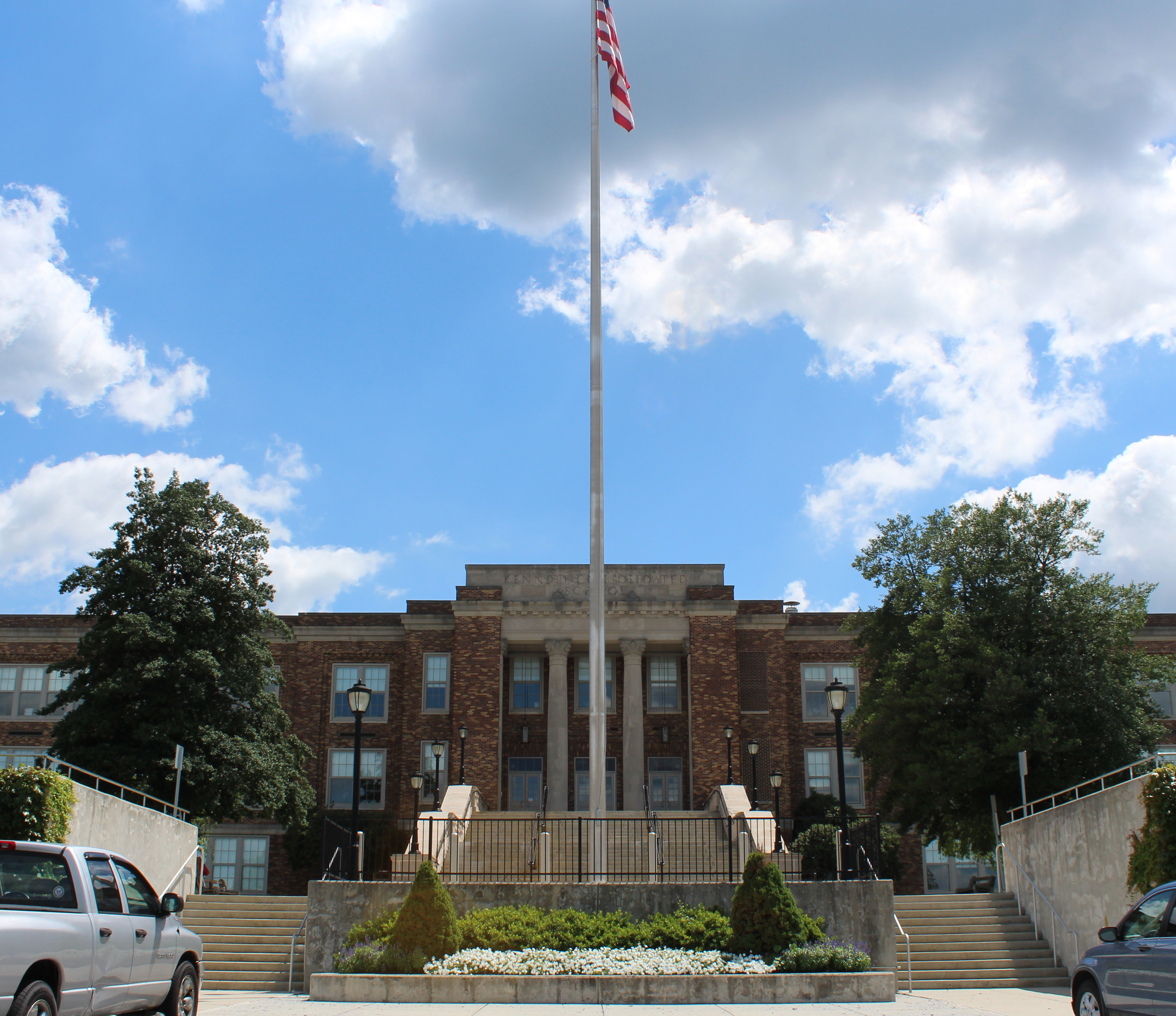
Kennett High School in Kennett Square, Pennsylvania, designed by E. William Martin and completed in 1931 with funds from Pierre S. du Pont.

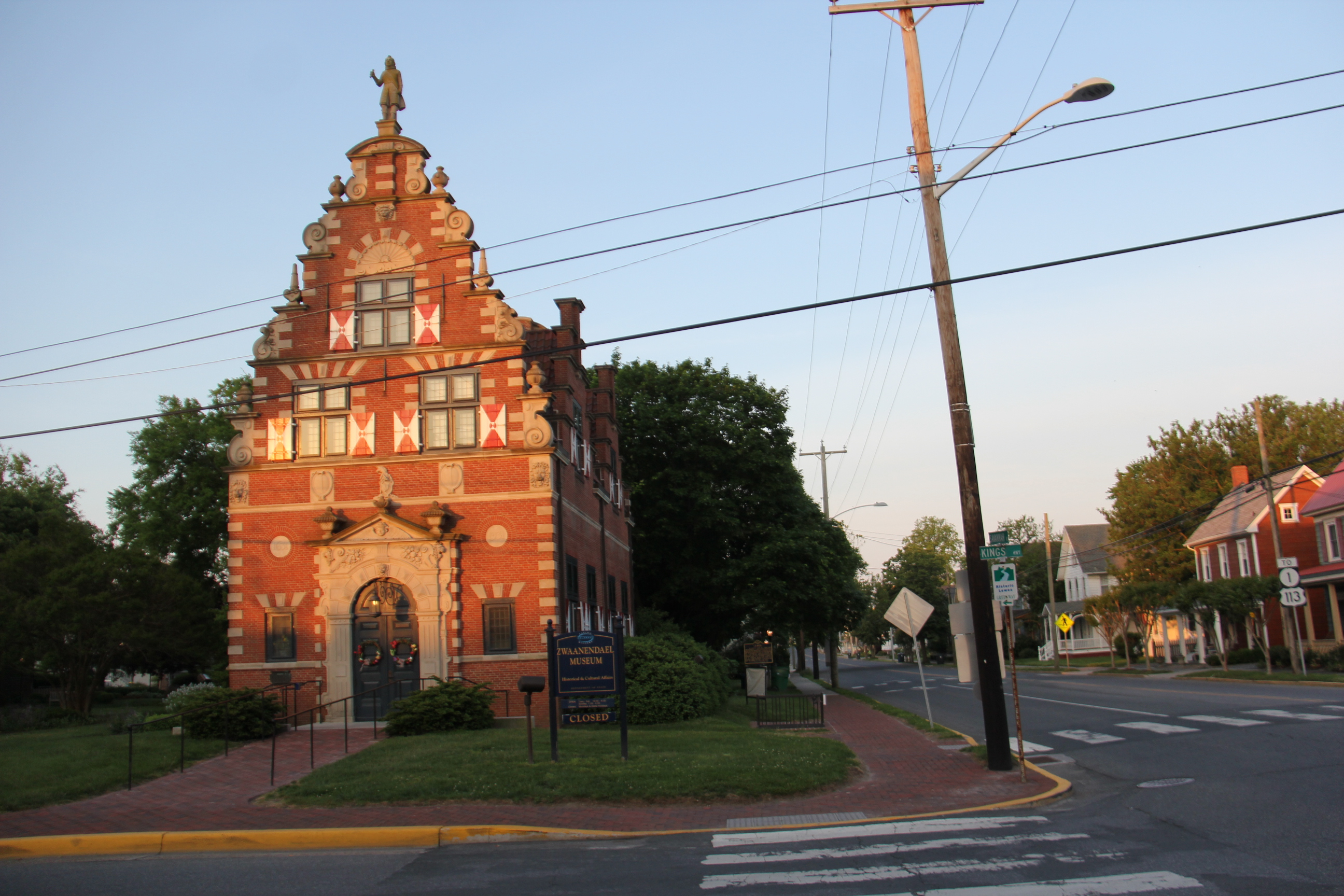
The Zwaanendael Museum in Lewes, designed by E. William Martin and completed in 1932.

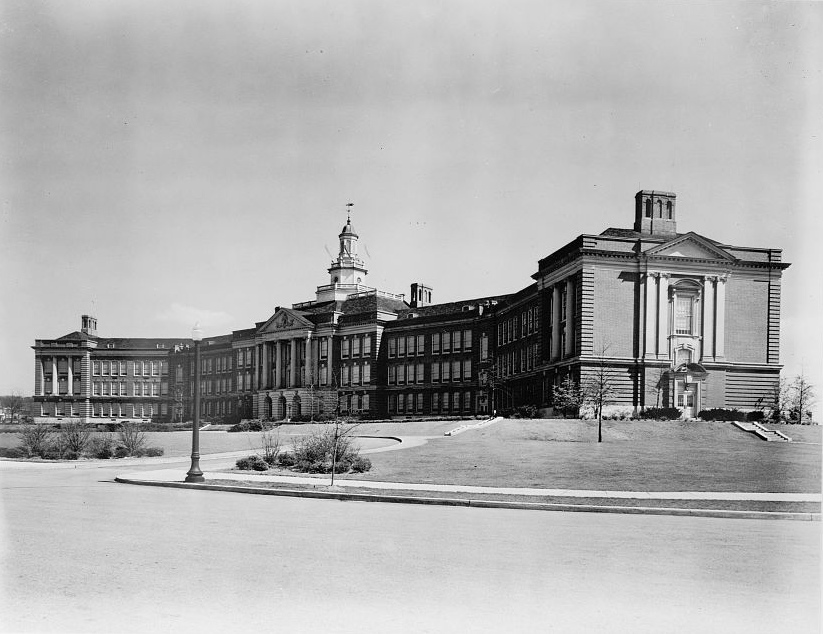
The former P. S. Dupont High School in Wilmington, designed by E. William Martin and completed in 1935.

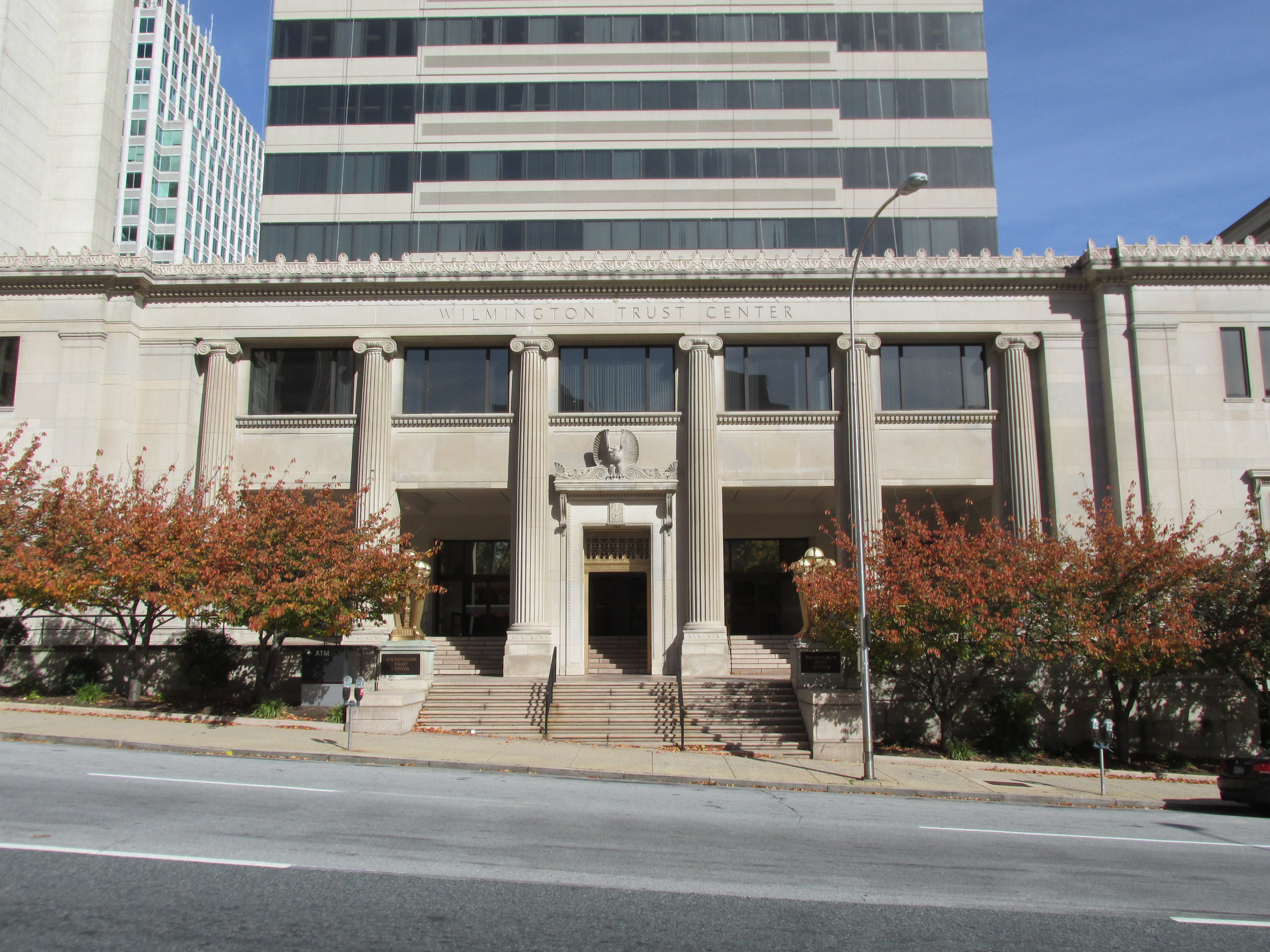
The former United States Post Office in Wilmington, designed by the Associated Federal Architects and completed in 1936.

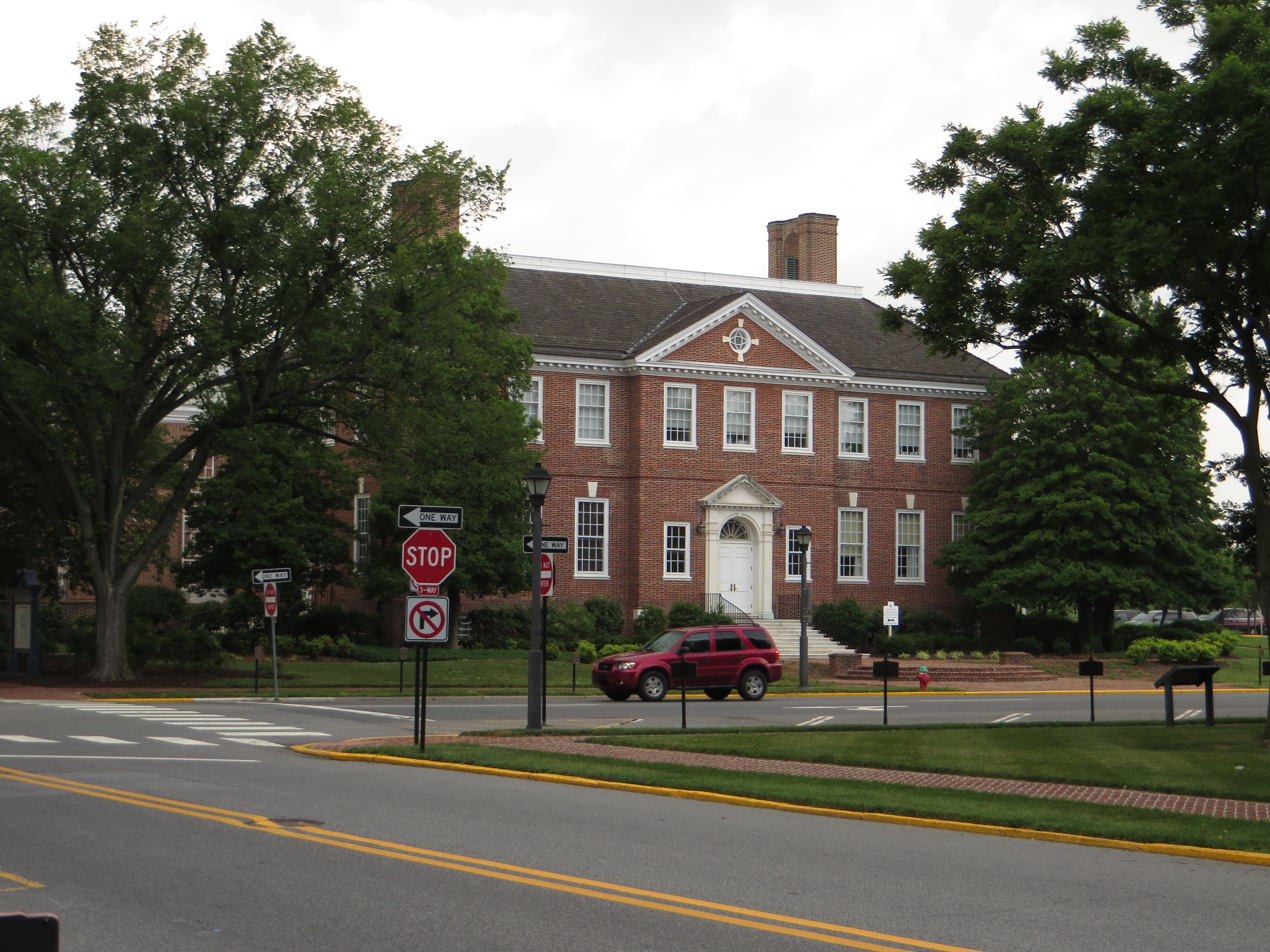
The Delaware Public Archives in Dover, designed by Martin & Jeffers and completed in 1938.

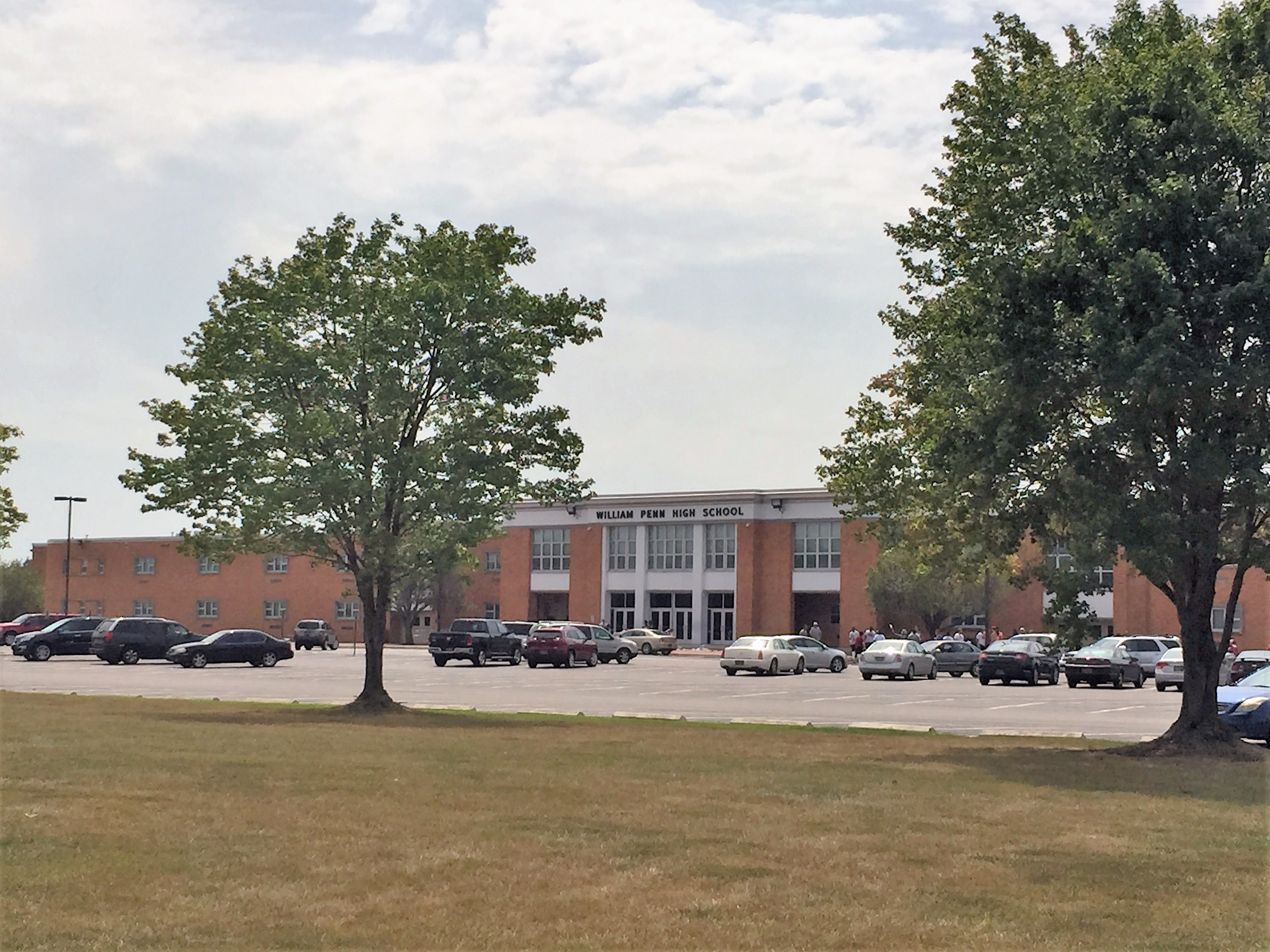
William Penn High School in New Castle, designed by Wason, Tingle & Brust and completed in 1966.

E. William Martin FAIA (November 2, 1891 – December 10, 1977) was a Scottish-born American architect in practice in Wilmington, Delaware from 1926 to 1965. In part through personal and political connections to members of the wealthy du Pont family Martin was architect of many important public works in Delaware, including public schools, the Zwaanendael Museum and the Delaware Legislative Hall.

== Life and career ==
Edward William Martin was born November 2, 1891, in the village of Inverarnan, Scotland to Edward Martin and Sarah Ann Martin. As a child his family immigrated to the United States and settled in Wilmington, where he was educated in the public schools. He began work as a drafter in Philadelphia in 1910, and entered the University of Pennsylvania in 1912. He later transferred to the University of Delaware, graduating in 1916 with a BS. He returned to Philadelphia to work for Wilson Eyre and in 1920 traveled to England to complete his education. There he worked for architect Percy Worthington in Manchester and attended the University of Liverpool, from which he earned a BArch in 1922.

Upon his return to the United States Martin entered practice in Philadelphia. In 1926 he moved his office to Wilmington, where he would remain for the rest of his career. In Wilmington Martin developed a close relationship with members of the wealthy du Pont family, including brothers Pierre S. du Pont and Alfred I. du Pont, through whose influence he received many public and private commissions. For about eight years, from 1935 to about 1944, Martin worked in partnership with architect Ralph Aubrey Jeffers under the name Martin & Jeffers. Martin developed a specialty for school buildings designed in traditional revival styles, though his work transitioned towards modernism after World War II. This accelerated after he was joined in 1952 by Donald S. Wason, a former employee of Holabird & Root and a recent graduate of the architecture school of the Illinois Institute of Technology, then under the leadership of Ludwig Mies van der Rohe. In 1961 they formed a partnership, Martin & Wason, which was shortly thereafter renamed Martin, Wason & Associates after the addition of Richard M. Tingle and James R. Brust. Martin retired in 1965, and the firm was succeeded by Wason, Tingle & Brust, which was active into the 1970s.

Martin joined the American Institute of Architects (AIA) in 1923. In 1945 he was elected a Fellow of the AIA. He was one of the first two Delaware architects to receive the honor, along with G. Morris Whiteside II, elected the same year. In 1936 he was awarded an honorary MA from the University of Delaware.

== Personal life ==
Martin was married in 1927 to LaReine Kennard. They had three children: Edith Frances, Alice Kennard and Dorothy Hewitt. Circa 1947 the family moved into a house on Orchard Road in Newark of Martin's own design, where he lived for the rest of his life. He died December 10, 1977, at the age of 86.

== Controversy and legacy ==
Martin was best known during his lifetime for the design of schools. Many of these projects developed through the influence of industrialist Pierre S. du Pont, an advocate for improved public schools who paid to build many schools directly through his Delaware School Auxiliary Association. The best known of these school projects is the P. S. Dupont High School (1935), named for du Pont. Martin's work for him extended outside of Delaware to Kennett Square, Pennsylvania, where he designed buildings on du Pont's Longwood estate and the Kennett High School (1931), funds for which were also given by du Pont.

In 1931 he was chosen as primary architect for the Delaware Legislative Hall (1933) after the initial appointment of outsider Norman M. Isham was protested by Alfred I. du Pont, Pierre's brother, and others. At its completion the building was heavily criticized by local architects and politicians alike. These projects invoked a protest by other local architects that du Pont was using his influence to award projects solely to Martin and petitioned him to consider other architects. Du Pont, however, was satisfied with Martin's work and saw no reason to change. Martin continued to be awarded extensive public work and other Delaware architects were not seriously considered for such projects until du Pont substantially retired from public life in 1940.

Martin was further responsible for the Zwaanendael Museum (1932), a replica of the city hall of Hoorn, the former Wilmington federal building (1936) and several buildings for the University of Delaware.

At least two buildings designed by Martin have been listed on the United States National Register of Historic Places, and others contribute to listed historic districts. His papers are collected at the University of Delaware.

== Architectural works ==
=== E. William Martin, 1926–1935 ===
- Holladay-Harrington House, 3705 Kennett Pike, Greenville, Delaware (1927, NRHP 2004)
- East Conservatory, (Note: Originally known as the Azalea House and extensively rebuilt in 1973 and 2004.) Longwood Gardens, Kennett Square, Pennsylvania (1928, altered)
- Irisbrook, the William F. Raskob house, 10 Montchanin Rd, Wilmington, Delaware (1928)
- Kennett High School, 100 E South St, Kennett Square, Pennsylvania (1931)
- Delaware Legislative Hall, (Note: Designed by E. William Martin, architect, with Norman M. Isham, consulting architect.) 411 Legislative Ave, New Castle, Delaware (1932)
- Zwaanendael Museum, 102 Kings Highway, Lewes, Delaware (1932)
- P. S. Dupont High School, 701 W 34th St, Wilmington, Delaware (1935, NRHP 1976)
- United States Post Office, Courthouse and Custom House (former), (Note: Designed by the Associated Federal Architects, consisting of Brown & Whiteside, E. William Martin and Robinson, Stanhope & Manning of Wilmington and Walker & Gillette of New York City. Now the Wilmington Trust Center.) 1100 N Market St, Wilmington, Delaware (1936)

=== Martin & Jeffers, 1935–1944 ===
- H. Fletcher Brown Vocational High School, N Market and W 14th Sts, Wilmington, Delaware (1938, demolished 1972)
- Delaware Public Archives, 121 MLK Jr Blvd N, Dover, Delaware (1938)
- Crawford H. Greenewalt house, 900 Old Kennett Rd, Wilmington, Delaware (1938)
- Milford Armory, 604 N Walnut St, Milford, Delaware (1938)
- Georgetown Armory, 109 W Pine St, Georgetown, Delaware (1942)

=== E. William Martin, 1944–1961 ===
- Newark Elementary School (former), (Note: Now Graham Hall of the University of Delaware.) 111 Academy St, Newark, Delaware (1949)
- Cannon Hall, University of Delaware, Newark, Delaware (1952)
- Wilmington Manor Elementary School, 200 E Roosevelt Ave, Wilmington Manor, Delaware (1952)
- Alison Hall, University of Delaware, Newark, Delaware (1953)
- West Park Place Elementary School, 193 W Park Pl, Newark, Delaware (1955)
- Longwood Gardens Visitor Center, Longwood Gardens, Kennett Square, Pennsylvania (1956)
- Laurel Hall, University of Delaware, Newark, Delaware (1957)
- Newark High School, 750 E Delaware Ave, Newark, Delaware (1957)
- George Read Middle School, 314 E Basin Rd, New Castle, Delaware (1959)
- De La Warr High School (former), 20 Chase Ave, New Castle, Delaware (1960)

=== Martin & Wason, 1961–1965 ===
- Christiana High School, 190 Salem Church Rd, Newark, Delaware (1963)
- Seaford Senior High School, 390 N Market St Ext, Seaford, Delaware (1966)

=== Wason, Tingle & Brust, from 1965 ===
- William Penn High School, 713 E Basin Rd, New Castle, Delaware (1966)
- St. Polycarp Church, 55 Ransom Ln, Smyrna, Delaware (1967)
- Glasgow High School, 1901 S College Ave, Newark, Delaware (1973)

== See also ==
- E. William Martin architectural works, University of Delaware
