= G. Morris Whiteside II =

American architect (1884–1963)

- Born: July 7, 1884; Philadelphia
- Died: December 22, 1963 (aged 79)
- Occupation: Architect
- Awards: Fellow, American Institute of Architects (1945)
- Practice: Brown & Whiteside; G. Morris Whiteside II; Whiteside, Moeckel & Carbonell

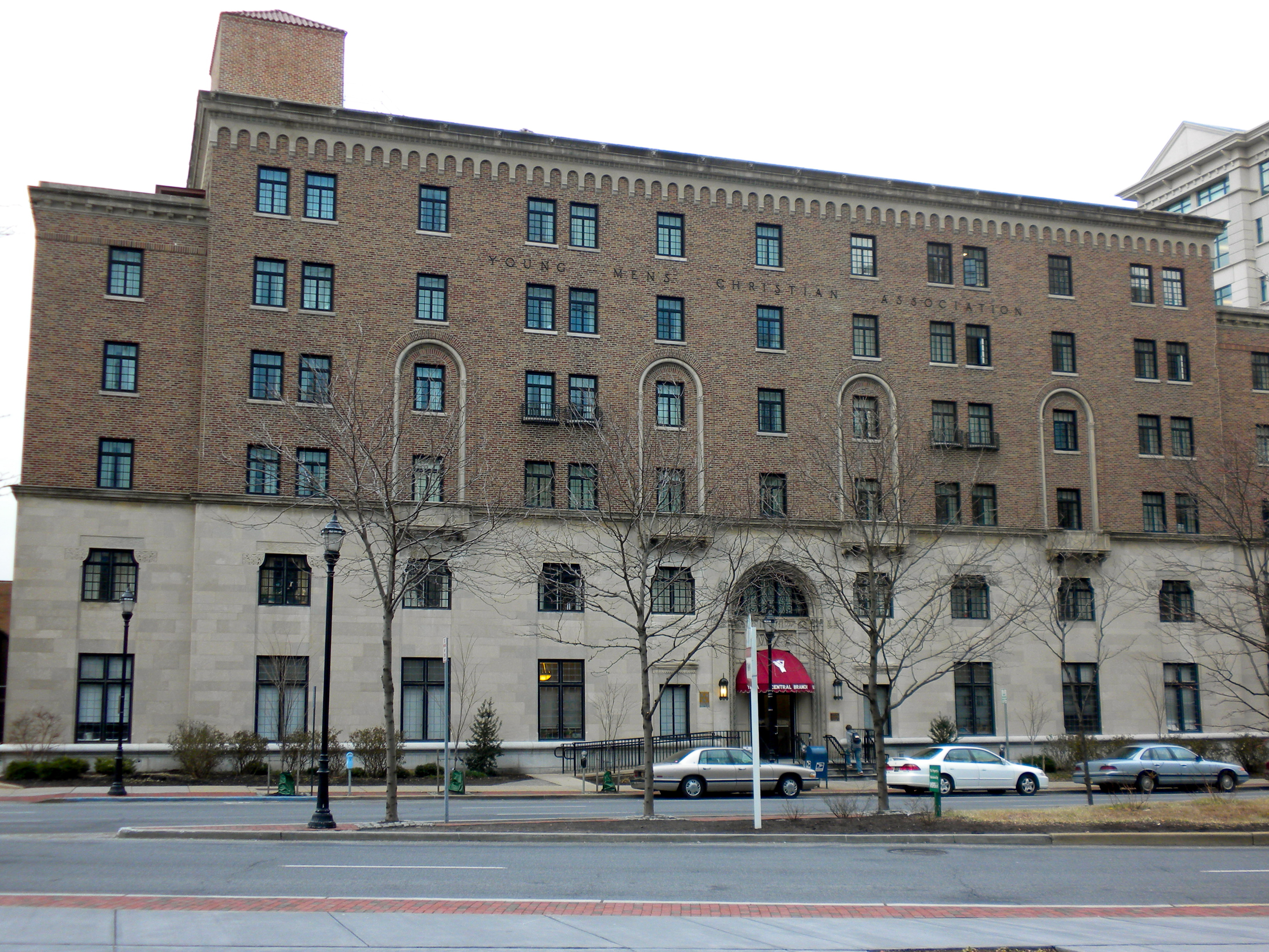
The Wilmington YMCA, designed by Brown & Whiteside and completed in 1929.

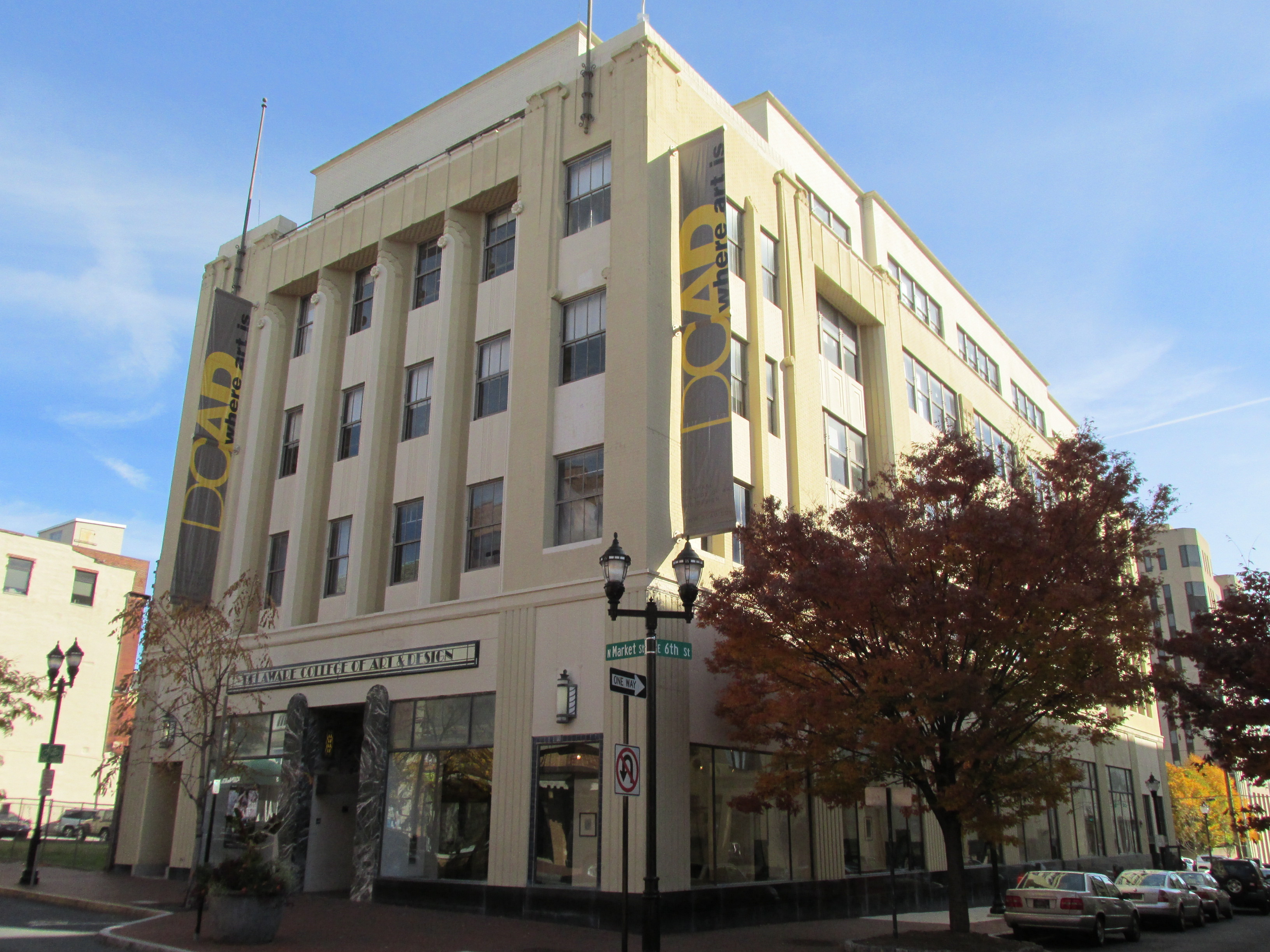
The Delmarva Power and Light Building in Wilmington, designed by Brown & Whiteside and completed in 1932.

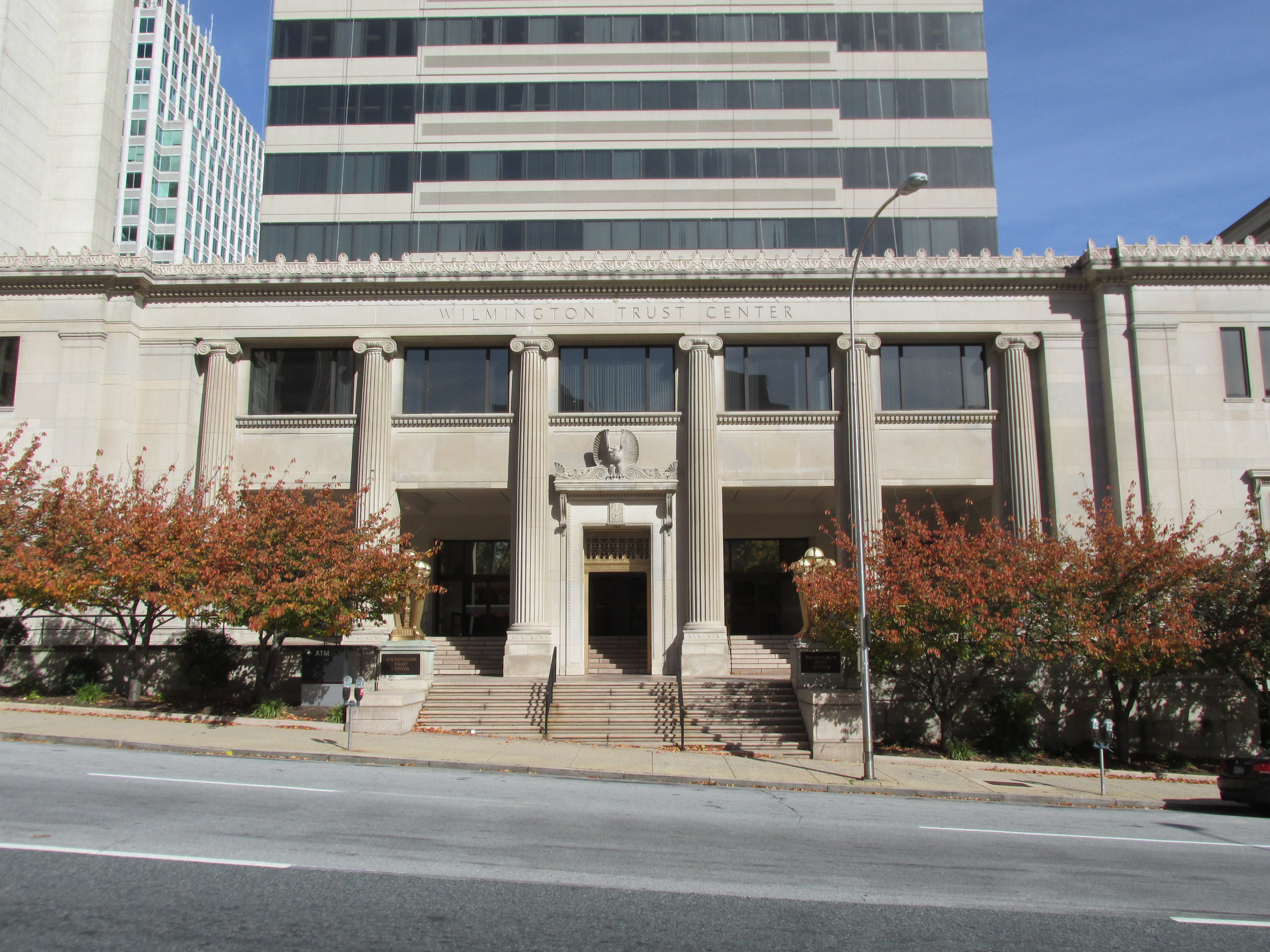
The former United States Post Office in Wilmington, designed by the Associated Federal Architects and completed in 1936.

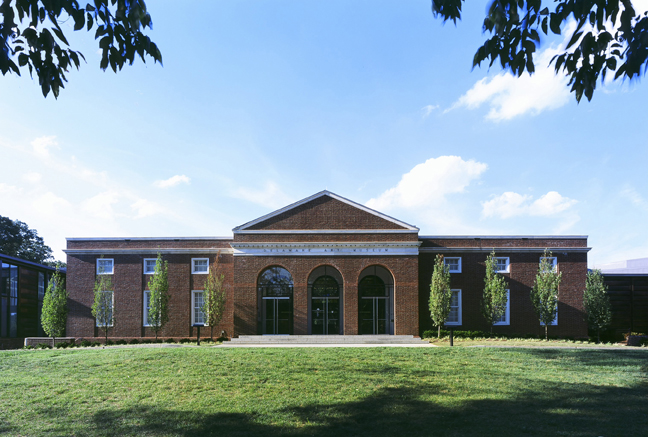
The Delaware Art Museum in Wilmington, designed by Victorine & Samuel Homsey and associate architect G. Morris Whiteside II and completed in 1938.

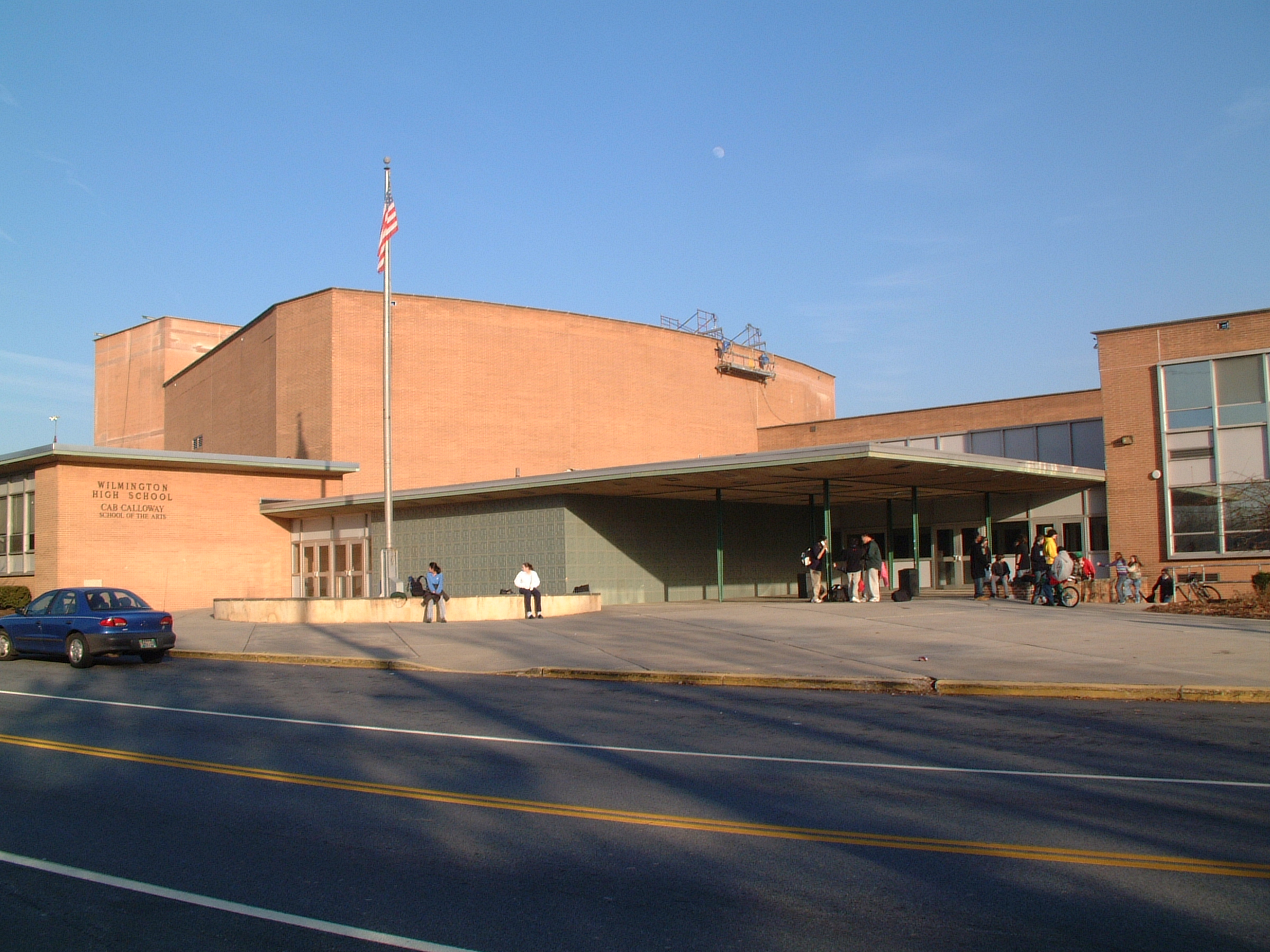
The former Wilmington High School, designed by Whiteside, Moeckel & Carbonell and completed in 1960.

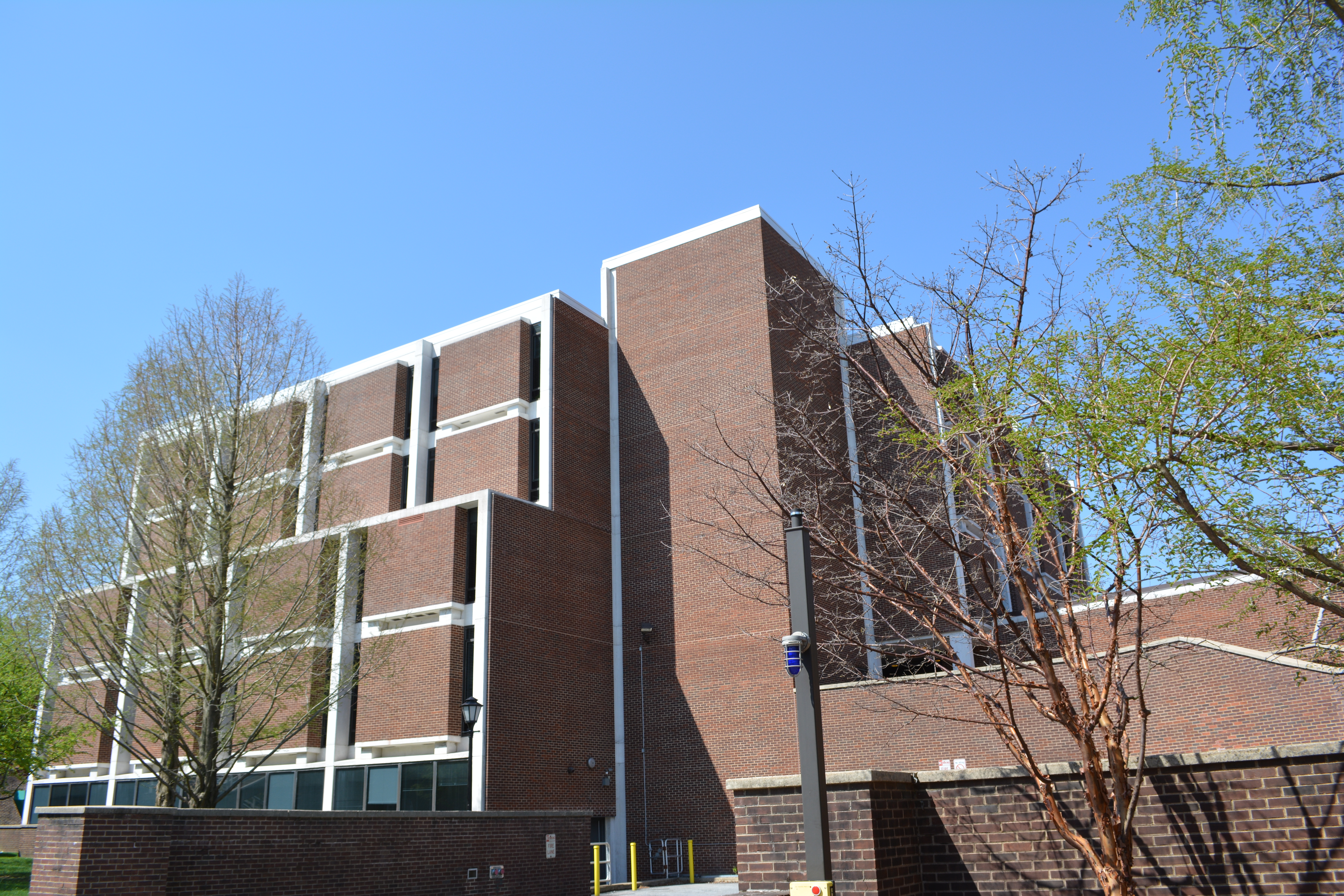
Smith Hall of the University of Delaware, designed by Whiteside, Moeckel & Carbonell and completed in 1970.

G. Morris Whiteside II FAIA (July 7, 1884 – December 22, 1963) was an American architect in practice in Wilmington, Delaware from 1910 until his death in 1963.

== Life and career ==
George Morris Whiteside 2d, or II, was born July 7, 1884, in Philadelphia to Frank Rush Whiteside and Margaret Amanda (Custer) Whiteside. He attended the University of Pennsylvania and was awarded a certificate in architecture in 1905. This was followed by further study at the Pennsylvania Academy of the Fine Arts and the American Academy in Rome and by work as a drafter. In 1910 he formed a partnership with Wilmington architect Walter Stewart Brown which was known as Brown & Whiteside. Brown died in 1931 and Whiteside continued the practice as a sole practitioner under the Brown & Whiteside name. Brown's name was later retired as Whiteside was joined by new associates, including William G. Moeckel in 1936 and Joseph E. Carbonell Jr. in 1945. The hiring of Moeckel began the transformation of the firm's output from traditional revival styles to modernism. In 1956 these three formed a partnership, known as Whiteside, Moeckel & Carbonell. Whiteside's son, George M. Whiteside III, became an associate in 1957. Whiteside practiced as a member of this firm until his death in 1963.

Whiteside was a member and secretary of the Wilmington Zoning Commission from 1930 to 1946 and was chair of the city plan commission in 1935. He served on the State Housing Commission from 1930 to 1932 and, after having been a major proponent of a state licensing law for architects, was a member of the architects registration board from 1933.

Whiteside joined the American Institute of Architects (AIA) in 1920. He was a prime mover in the establishment of the Delaware chapter of the AIA in 1932 and was its first president, serving two terms. In 1945 he was elected a Fellow of the AIA. He was one of the first two Delaware architects to receive the honor, along with E. William Martin, elected the same year.

== Personal life ==
Whiteside was married in 1930 to Henryette Leech Stadelman. They had two children: Mary Whiteside and George Morris Whiteside III. He died December 22, 1963, at the age of 79.

== Legacy ==
Moeckel and Carbonell continued the practice as Whiteside, Moeckel & Carbonell until 1979, when they reorganized as Moeckel/Carbonell & Partners. In 1984 it was again reorganized as Moeckel Carbonell Associates in 1984. Later principals included Joseph E. Carbonell III and R. Thorpe Moeckel, sons of the existing partners, and Harold E. Judefind Jr. By 2016, when the firm closed, Judefind was the sole remaining principal. Having been founded by Brown in 1909, it was at the time of its closure the oldest architectural firm in Delaware and among the oldest in the United States.

At least two buildings designed by Whiteside and his partners have been listed on the United States National Register of Historic Places.

== Architectural works ==
=== Brown & Whiteside, from 1910 ===
- Immanuel Church Highlands, (Note: Designed by Frederick M. Mann, architect, with Brown & Whiteside, associate architects.) 2400 W. 17th St, Wilmington, Delaware (1915)
- Tower Hill School, 2813 W 17th St, Wilmington, Delaware (1920)
- Wilmington YMCA, 501 W 11th St, Wilmington, Delaware (1929, NRHP 2002)
- Artisans' Savings Bank Building, (Note: Now the library of the Delaware Historical Society.) 505 N Market St, Wilmington, Delaware (1930)
- First and Central Presbyterian Church, 1101 N Market St, Wilmington, Delaware (1930)
- Delmarva Power and Light Building, 600 N Market St, Wilmington, Delaware (1932, NRHP 1985)
- United States Post Office, Courthouse and Custom House (former), (Note: Designed by the Associated Federal Architects, consisting of Brown & Whiteside, E. William Martin and Robinson, Stanhope & Manning of Wilmington and Walker & Gillette of New York City. Now the Wilmington Trust Center.) 1100 N Market St, Wilmington, Delaware (1936)

=== G. Morris Whiteside II, until 1956 ===
- Delaware Art Museum, (Note: Designed by Victorine & Samuel Homsey, architects, with G. Morris Whiteside II, associate architect.) 2301 Kentmere Pkwy, Wilmington, Delaware (1938)
- Chapel, Delaware State Hospital, New Castle, Delaware (1939)
- Mullins', 564 N Market St, Wilmington, Delaware (1941)
- Eastlake housing, 26th and Locust Sts, Wilmington, Delaware (1943, demolished)

=== Whiteside, Moeckel & Carbonell, 1956–1979 ===
- Mid-Town Parking Center, W 9th St, Wilmington, Delaware (1957, demolished 2013)
- Brandywine High School, 1400 Foulk Rd, Wilmington, Delaware (1959)
- Concord Pike Library, 3406 Concord Pike, Wilmington, Delaware (1959, demolished 2005)
- Wilmington High School (former), 100 N Dupont Rd, Wilmington, Delaware (1960)
- Avon Products Northeast Regional Headquarters, 2100 Ogletown Rd, Newark, Delaware (1961)
- Aldersgale United Methodist Church, 2313 Concord Pike, Wilmington, Delaware (1962)
- Smith Hall, University of Delaware, Newark, Delaware (1970)
- Wilmington Public Library remodeling, (Note: Designed by Shepley, Bulfinch, Richardson & Abbott, architects, with Whiteside, Moeckel & Carbonell, associate architects.) 10 E 10th St, Wilmington, Delaware (1971)
- Louis L. Redding City/County Building, (Note: Designed by Vincent G. Kling & Partners, architects, with Whiteside, Moeckel & Carbonell, associate architects.) 800 N French St, Wilmington, Delaware (1977)

=== Moeckel/Carbonell & Partners, 1979–1984 ===
- Wilmington station renovation and restoration, 100 S French St, Wilmington, Delaware (1984)

=== Moeckel Carbonell Associates, 1984–2016 ===
- Lammot du Pont Laboratory, (Note: Designed by Ayers Saint Gross, architects, with Moeckel Carbonell Associates, associate architects.) University of Delaware, Newark, Delaware (1993)
- Delaware Legislative Hall renovation and restoration, 411 Legislative Ave, New Castle, Delaware (1997)
