= Holladay-Harrington House =

Historic house in Delaware, US

- U.S. National Register of Historic Places
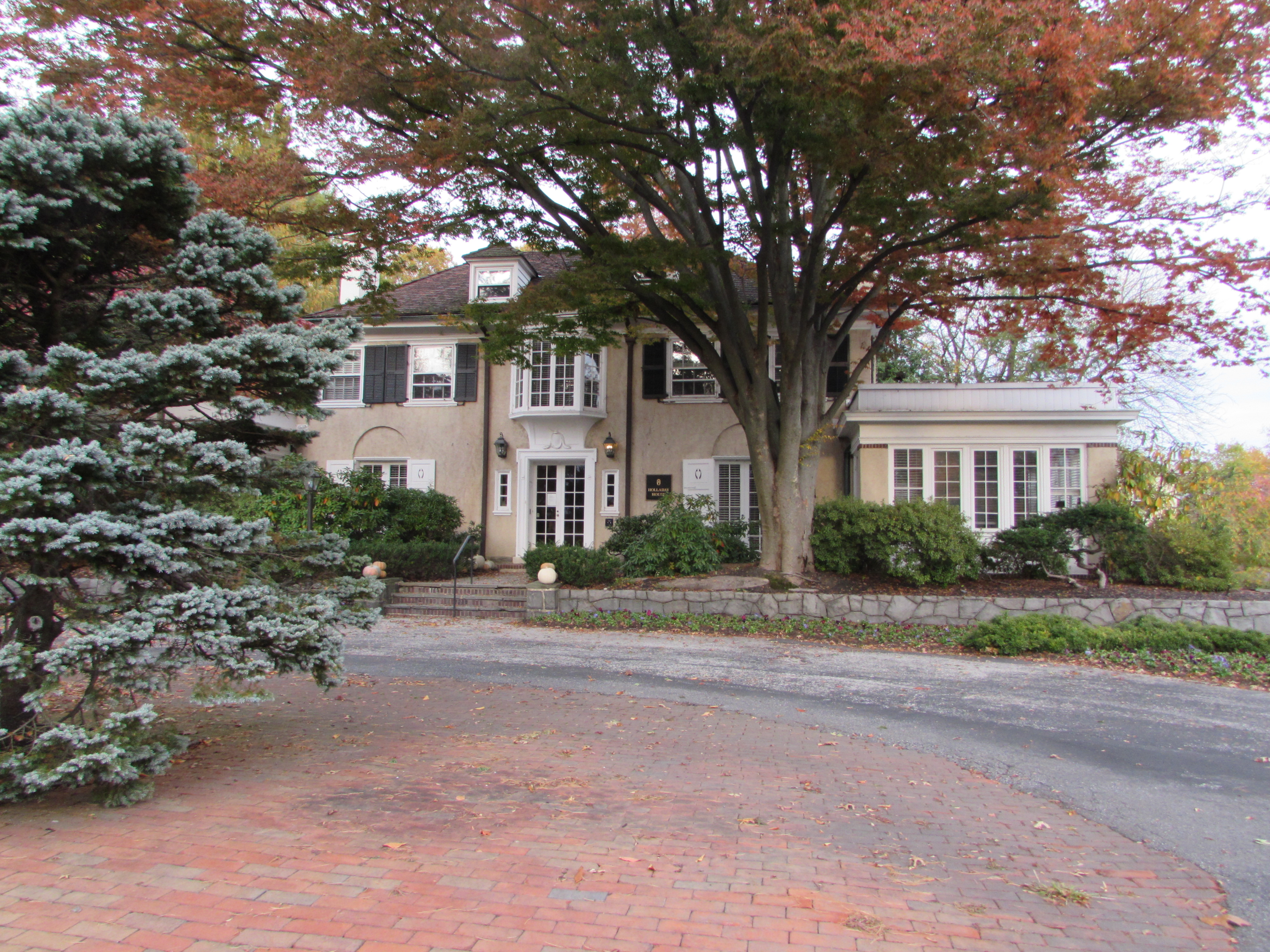
- Front of the Holladay-Harrington House, now offices of Patterson Schwartz Realty.

- Location within Delaware Location within the United States
- Location: 3705 Kennett Pike, Greenville, Delaware
- Coordinates: 39°46′28″N 75°35′34″W
- Area: 4.8 acres (1.9 ha)
- Built: c. 1927
- Architect: Martin, E. William
- Architectural style: Colonial Revival
- NRHP reference No.: 04001077
- Added to NRHP: September 30, 2004

Holladay-Harrington House is a historic estate located at Greenville, Delaware, United States. It was designed about 1927 by noted Delaware architect E. William Martin. It is a 2 1/2-story, three bays wide, stuccoed dwelling in the Colonial Revival style. The house has a hipped roof with wide overhanging eaves, projecting pavilion-like side sun porches, and French doors in all three first floor bays. The property includes a contributing garage, three small greenhouses, driveway pillars, fountain and concrete pool, retaining wall, metal fencing with grape design near greenhouses, and landscape features.

It was listed on the National Register of Historic Places in 2004.
