= P. S. Dupont High School =

- U.S. National Register of Historic Places
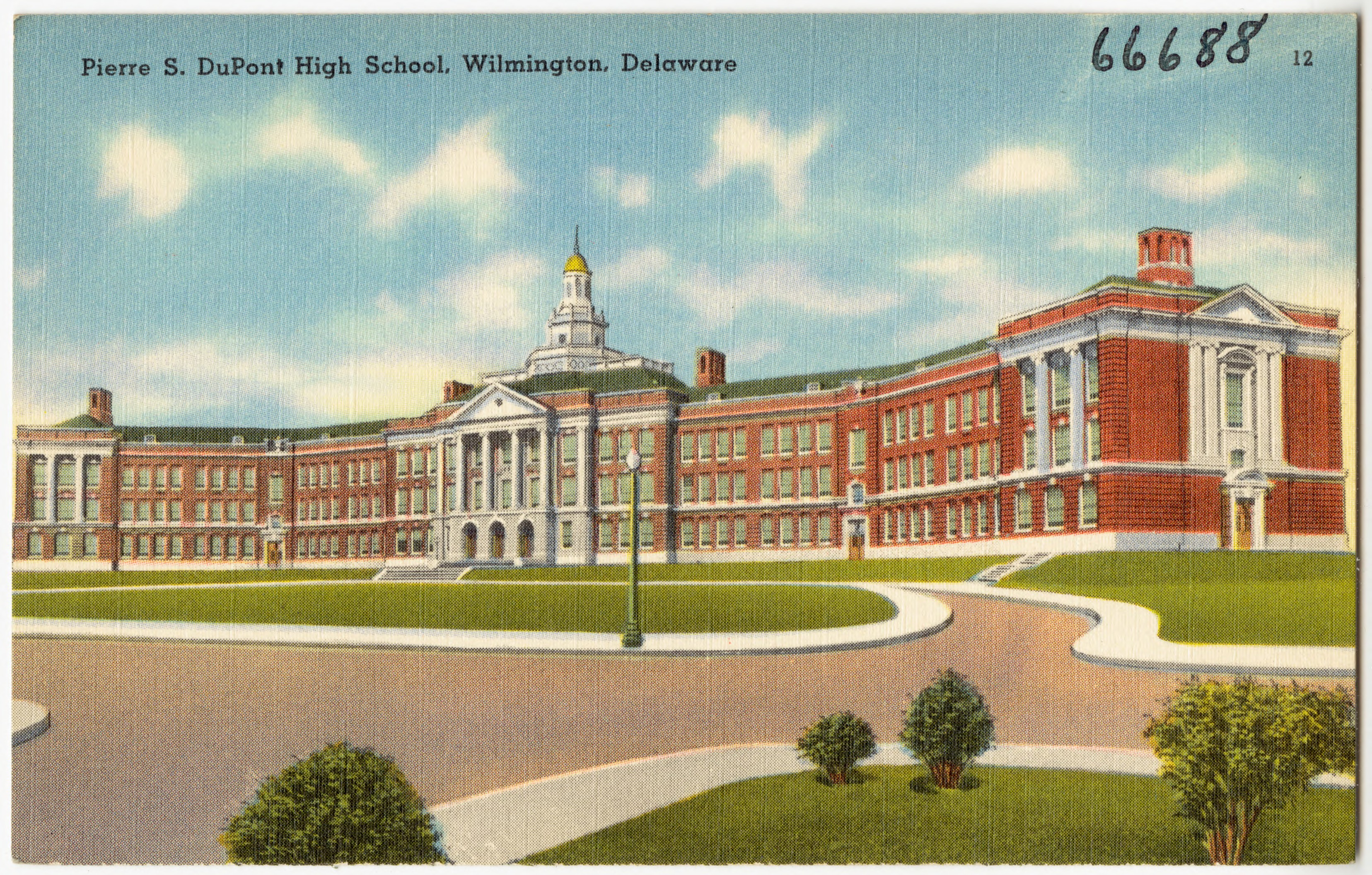
- Pierre S. Dupont High School

- Location within Delaware Location within the United States
- Location: 701 W. 34th St., Wilmington, Delaware
- Coordinates: 39°45′51″N 75°32′0″W
- Area: 10 acres (4.0 ha)
- Built: 1934
- Built by: Smith, Karno
- Architect: E. William Martin
- Architectural style: Colonial Revival, Neo-Georgian
- Website: https://psdupont.brandywineschools.org/
- NRHP reference No.: 86002917
- Added to NRHP: October 23, 1976

P. S. Dupont High School is a historic high school building located in Wilmington, New Castle County, Delaware that houses a middle school. It was built in 1934, and is a four-story, E-shaped, red brick building in a Colonial Revival / Neo-Georgian style. It has a hipped roof covered with dark reddish-brown shingles, topped by a wood, three-level tower and cupola that ends in a multiple-sided, bell-like copper roof and weather vane. The school is named for Pierre S. du Pont (1870–1954).

It was one of three traditional public high schools in Wilmington, and initially did not accept black students, who were required to go to Howard High School. It was disestablished after Wilmington was divided into multiple school districts in the 1980s.

It was added to the National Register of Historic Places in 1986. The school is currently used as a middle school in the Brandywine School District.

== Notable alumni ==
- Velda Jones-Potter, businesswomen & politician
- Daniel Whyte (American football), former professional football player
