= Daniel Whyte (American football) =

American football tight end

No. 80
- Position: Tight end

Personal information
- Born: August 18, 1951 (age 75); West Grove, Pennsylvania, U.S.
- Listed height: 6 ft 1 in (1.85 m)
- Listed weight: 245 lb (111 kg)

Career information
- High school: P. S. duPont (Wilmington, Delaware)
- College: Johnson C. Smith

Career history
- Washington Redskins (1975)*; Charlotte Hornets (1975); Detroit Lions (1976)*
- * Offseason or practice squad member only

Career WFL statistics
- Games played: 11
- Receptions: 13
- Receiving yards: 252
- Receiving touchdowns: 1

Daniel R. Whyte (born August 18, 1951) is an American former professional football tight end. He played for the Charlotte Hornets of the World Football League in 1975 and signed with the Washington Redskins and Detroit Lions of the National Football League.

== Early life and college ==
Whyte attended P. S. duPont High School in Wilmington, Delaware. He played college football at Johnson C. Smith University, where he was a starting left guard as a freshman.

== Professional career ==
Whyte signed with the Washington Redskins in 1975 but was released. He subsequently joined the Charlotte Hornets, playing in 11 games and starting four. He caught 13 passes for 252 yards and one touchdown.

In 1976, Whyte signed with the Detroit Lions. He injured his right shoulder before the team's Hall of Fame Game appearance and underwent surgery. He attempted a comeback the following year, but the injury ended his playing career. The Lions subsequently released him.

== Later work ==
After his playing career, Whyte worked as a talent scout for eight seasons. He earned a bachelor's degree in recreation and sports counseling from Ohio University in 1987 and founded the National Student Athletic Society that year. The organization provided mentoring, academic support and career preparation for student-athletes.

Whyte earned a master's degree in management from Goldey-Beacom College in 2013. He later worked at Gateway Lab School in Wilmington, Delaware, first as a behavioral interventionist and then as director of its athletics program. He also helped found Club R.E.A.L., a youth program in Mount Ida, Maryland.
