= Delaware College of Art and Design =

Art school in Wilmington, Delaware

Delaware College of Art & Design
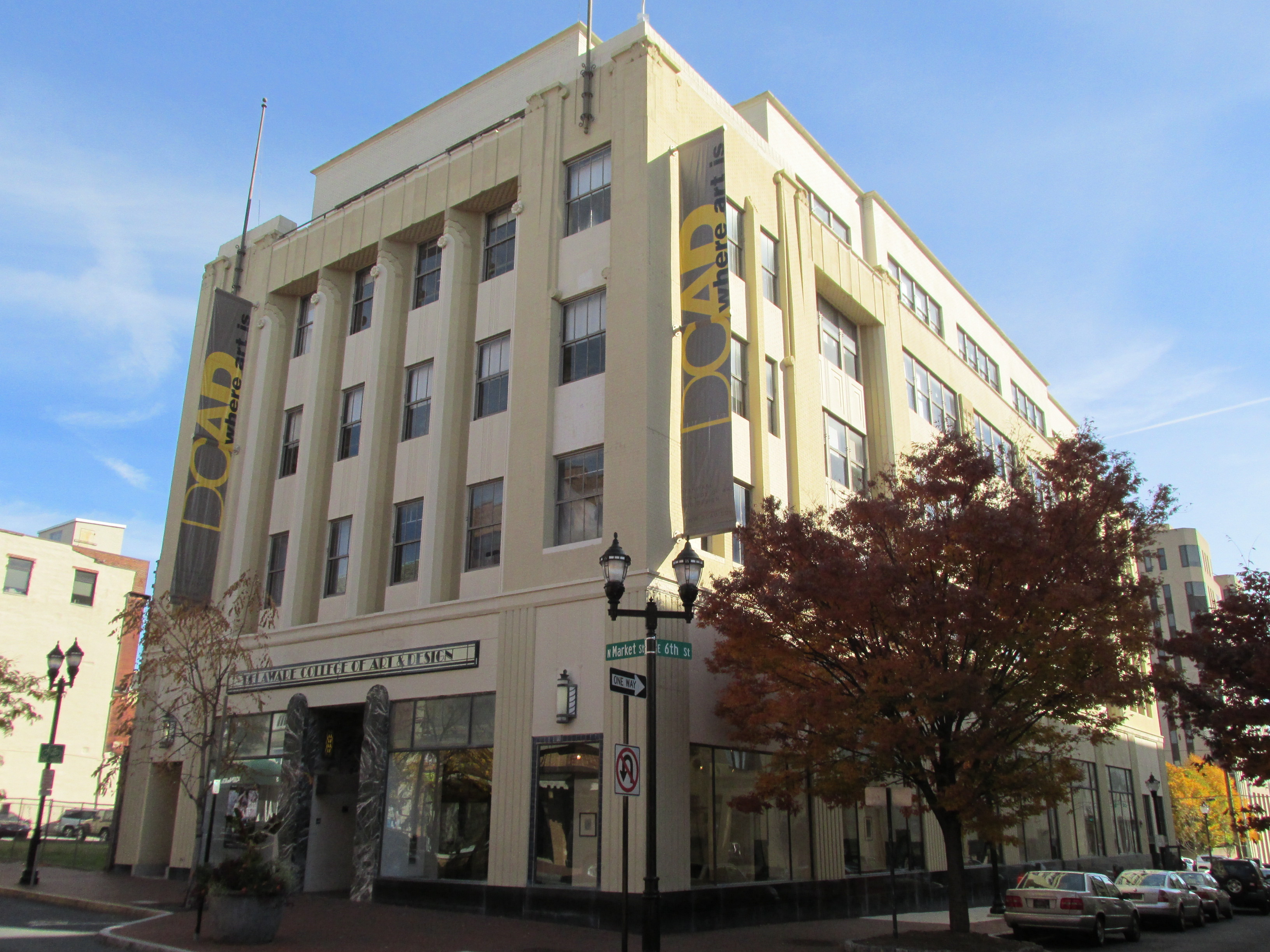
- The historic DCAD Building
- Type: Private art school
- Active: 1997–2024
- Accreditation: MSCHE
- President: Jean Dahlgren
- Faculty: 50
- Location: Wilmington, Delaware, 19801, United States; 39°44′31″N 75°33′00″W
- Campus: Urban
- Website: www.dcad.edu

- Location within Delaware Location within the United States

Delaware College of Art and Design (DCAD) was a private art school in Wilmington, Delaware. It was founded in 1997 through a partnership between the Pratt Institute and the Corcoran College of Art and Design. It was accredited by the Middle States Commission on Higher Education and the National Association of Schools of Art and Design. On May 23, 2024, the college announced it would wind down operations and close permanently.

== History ==
The Wilmington Renaissance Corporation established the school in 1997 as part of their downtown revitalization efforts. The school reached a record attendance of 250 students in 2011, which declined to 160 by 2017. Only 107 students remained in 2024 when the closure was announced due to low enrollment. Both the Moore College of Art and Design and Pennsylvania College of Art and Design agreed to accept incoming freshmen and rising sophomores as part of a teach-out plan.

== Campus ==
DCAD's downtown Wilmington location was in the former Delmarva Power & Light Building at 600 North Market Street. The building was converted for use as studio and classroom space, as well as administrative offices for DCAD faculty and staff. The building was built in the Art Deco style and is listed on the National Register of Historic Places. The 600 North Market building was the initial opening site for the college with an entering student population of 50.

DCAD offered student housing on the adjacent blocks with Saville Apartments to the south at 521 North King Street and a second building to the north at 707 North King Street. The multimillion-dollar ($4.7M) expansion in student housing at 707 North King Street opened for Fall 2012 in response to a significant increase in requests for on-campus residency. The former hotel's kitchen was transformed into a student cafeteria for all resident and commuting students. However, as the student body dwindled, the school sold the Saville residential property in 2021.

== See also ==
- List of art schools
- List of colleges and universities in Delaware
