= Delaware Distance Classic =

The Delaware Distance Classic is a 15-kilometer road running competition held in October near Wilmington, Delaware. It is the event of the year for the Pike Creek Valley Running Club (PCVRC). The course has rotated every few years based on sponsorship. The event began in 1983 as a fund raiser for the PCVRC but the Special Olympics has been the beneficiary for the last few years.
