= Javor Mills =

American football player (born 1979)

No. 70
- Position: Defensive end

Personal information
- Born: May 11, 1979 (age 47); Wilmington, Delaware
- Listed height: 6 ft 5 in (1.96 m)
- Listed weight: 271 lb (123 kg)

Career information
- High school: Wilmington (DE) Concord
- College: Auburn

Career history
- Jacksonville Jaguars (2002-2003); Indianapolis Colts (2005)*; Cologne Centurions (2005)
- * Offseason or practice squad member only
- Stats at Pro Football Reference

Javor Mills (born May 11, 1979) is an American former football defensive end. He played for the Jacksonville Jaguars in 2002.
