= Chip Reid =

American journalist

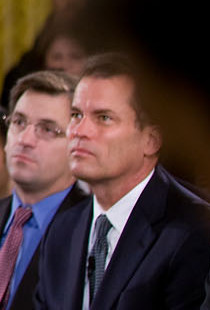
- Reid in 2010
- Born: Charles Henry Reid Jr. February 24, 1955 (age 71); Wilmington, Delaware, United States
- Education: Princeton University; Columbia Law School; Vassar College; Concord High School
- Occupation: Television journalist
- Years active: 1982–present
- Employers: ABC News (1988–89); WTTG-TV (1990–93); WJLA-TV (1994–96); NBC News (1996–2007); CBS News (2007–2022)
- Notable work: Battle Scars
- Spouse: Nina Black (m. 2006)

Charles Henry "Chip" Reid Jr. (born February 24, 1955) is an American broadcast journalist. He was named CBS News National correspondent in June 2011. Prior to that, he had been the network's congressional correspondent and its Chief White House Correspondent, a position he assumed in January 2009.

Prior to his association with CBS, he was employed by NBC News, where he covered politics and Capitol Hill.

== Early life and education ==
Reid was born February 24, 1955 in Wilmington, Delaware to Charles H. Reid Sr. and Norma Reid. He was educated at Concord High School, a public secondary school in Wilmington, Delaware.

Reid then attended Vassar College, a private liberal arts college in the town of Poughkeepsie in New York state, from which he graduated Phi Beta Kappa with a degree in psychology in 1977. He then moved on to Princeton University in New Jersey, graduating with a Master's of Public Affairs degree. Lastly, he earned a Juris Doctor degree from Columbia Law School in 1982.

== Career ==
=== Legal ===
Reid practiced law, as a Counsel to the U.S. Senate Judiciary Committee from 1982 through 1986. He then served as a specialist in litigation, and lobbying from 1986 to 1988. Reid served as General Counsel to Joe Biden’s 1988 Presidentail campaign.

=== Journalism ===
==== ABC ====
Reid began his network journalism career at ABC News as a field producer in Washington. He worked for ABC from 1988 to 1989.

==== TV reporter ====
Reid continued his journalism career working for WTTG-TV in Washington from 1990-93. He moved to WJLA-TV from 1994-96.

==== NBC ====
From 1996 through 2000, Reid was based in Washington, D.C. for NBC; covering among other beltway stories, Al Gore's 2000 Presidential campaign, voting irregularities of the 2000 Presidential election, and the impeachment process of then President Clinton.

Starting in 2001, Reid began working for the Los Angeles base of NBC, spending 6 weeks with a U.S. Marines lead unit during the initial invasion of U.S. troops from Kuwait to Baghdad. After the September 11, 2001 attacks, Reid reported from Ground Zero and the Pentagon, as well as covering stories on the war on terror from Afghanistan, Israel, Uzbekistan, Egypt, and around the world. He continued reporting in this capacity through 2003.

Reid began covering the Senate and the House of Representatives for NBC News in the fall of 2004, and he served as a political coverage anchor for MSNBC, as well as a reporter for all the major NBC News broadcasts.

==== CBS ====
Reid joined CBS News in 2007 as a Capitol Hill correspondent, extensively covering the 2008 presidential campaign. He also traveled with Sen. John McCain during much of the campaign.

During the COVID-19 pandemic, Reid filed two reports about the emotional toll of the social isolation caused by the shutdowns, including one showing his reunion with his own mother in March 2021. He subsequently retired from CBS.

==== Author ====
In 2023, Reid's book Battle Scars: Twenty Years Later, Third Battalion Fifth Marines Looks Back at the Iraq War and How it Changed Their Lives was published by Casemate Publishers. It is about the Marine battalion with whom Reid was embedded for six weeks as an NBC News correspondent during the invasion of Iraq in 2003.

== Personal life ==
Reid and his wife Nina Black live in Washington, D.C.

Reid gave the commencement address to the Vassar College Class of 2011.
