= Concord High School (Delaware) =

Location
- 2501 Ebright Rd; Wilmington, Delaware 19810; United States
- Coordinates: 39°49′49″N 75°31′29″W

Information
- Type: Public
- Established: 1969 (57 years ago)
- School district: Brandywine School District
- CEEB code: 080156
- Principal: Jeffrey Lawson
- Faculty: 75 (FTE) (2022–2023)
- Grades: 9–12
- Enrollment: 1,014 (2024–25)
- Colors: Maroon and white
- Athletics conference: Blue Hen Conference - Flight B
- Mascot: Raider
- Website: www.brandywineschools.org/concord

Concord High School (CHS) is a public secondary school located in unincorporated New Castle County, Delaware, United States, with a Wilmington postal address. It is one of three high schools in the Brandywine School District. There was a total of 1,014 students enrolled in the fall for the 2024–2025 school year. Jeffrey Lawson is the current principal of Concord High School.

Its attendance boundary includes parts of the City of Wilmington, and a small section of Ardentown.

== History ==
CHS opened in 1967 in response to a rapidly rising population that produced too many students for Brandywine High School, then in the Alfred I. duPont District, to handle on its own. Upon opening, it was located on the same campus as Hanby Junior High and taught only ninth and tenth grades. Construction on CHS' own building was delayed due to a worker strike, and it did not open until January 1970, an entire semester after the planned date and still without its gym, auditorium, and swimming pool completed. During the delay, CHS was forced to leave Hanby and move temporarily into Brandywine High School's building; the two schools taught on a rotating basis: BHS students attended in the morning and CHS students attended in the afternoon.

== Athletics ==
Concord is a member of Flight B of the Blue Hen Conference in the Delaware Interscholastic Athletic Association (DIAA); the Raiders compete in Class 2A, District 1 for football. Concord fields a full slate of teams in all three sports seasons, including crew, cross country, field hockey, football, soccer, volleyball, cheerleading, basketball, track, swimming/diving, wrestling, baseball, golf, lacrosse, and softball. Concord's athletic director is Larry Jacobs.

== Notable alumni ==
- Justin Brown (born 1991, class of 2009), CFL wide receiver
- Terri Dendy (born 1965), former track and field athlete
- Vicki Huber (born 1967), Olympic middle-distance runner
- Mary Knisely (born 1959), former middle- and long-distance running; Pan Am champion at 3,000 meters
- Luke Matheny (born 1976, class of 1993), Academy Award-winning motion picture director, writer and actor
- Scott A. McGregor (born 1956, class of 1974), technology executive and philanthropist
- Derrick Milano (born 1993, class of 2012), Grammy Award-winning songwriter
- Javor Mills (born 1979, class of 1998), former NFL player
- Montell Owens (born 1984, class of 2002), former NFL fullback
- Chip Reid (class of 1973), CBS news reporter
- Adam Ruben (born 1979, class of 1997), author and Science Channel host
- Don Schiff (born 1955, class of 1974), musician/rock instrumentalist
- Ron Suskind (born 1959), Pulitzer Prize winner (journalism) and author
- Paul Worrilow (born 1990), NFL linebacker
