= List of Delaware locations by per capita income =

Delaware is the ninth-richest state in the United States of America, with a per capita income of $23,305 (2000) and a personal per capita income of $32,810 (2003). The per capita income in 2010 was $29,007.

== Delaware counties ranked by per capita income ==
Note: Data is from the 2010 United States Census Data and the 2006-2010 American Community Survey 5-Year Estimates.

Rank	County	Per capita income	Median household income	Median family income	Population	Number of households
1	New Castle	$31,220	$62,474	$78,072	538,479	202,651
2	Delaware	$29,007	$57,599	$69,182	897,934	342,297
3	United States	$27,334	$51,914	$62,982	308,745,538	116,716,292
4	Sussex	$26,779	$51,046	$59,053	197,145	79,368
5	Kent	$24,194	$53,183	$60,949	162,310	60,278

== Delaware places ranked by per capita income ==
Rank	Place	County	Per Capita Income	Median House- hold Income	Median Family Income	Population	Number of Households	MSA
1	Greenville	New Castle County	$83,223	$116,674	$136,876	2,332	1,190	Philadelphia—Wilimington—Atlantic City, PA—NJ—DE—MD
2	Henlopen Acres	Sussex County	$82,091	$122,433	$162,681	139	69	Salisbury, MD—DE
3	South Bethany	Sussex County	$53,624	$77,125	$89,666	492	253	Salisbury, MD—DE
4	Dewey Beach	Sussex County	$51,598	$79,471	$97,505	301	161	Salisbury, MD—DE
5	Bethany Beach	Sussex County	$41,306	$51,875	$67,500	903	473	Salisbury, MD—DE
7	Hockessin	New Castle County	$40,516	$100,844	$108,784	12,902	4,464	Philadelphia—Wilimington—Atlantic City, PA—NJ—DE—MD
8	North Star	New Castle County	$39,677	$110,616	$113,621	8,277	2,629	Philadelphia—Wilimington—Atlantic City, PA—NJ—DE—MD
9	Rehoboth Beach	Sussex County	$38,494	$51,429	$58,558	1,495	847	Salisbury, MD—DE
10	Ardentown	New Castle County	$35,577	$64,286	$72,500	300	136	Philadelphia—Wilimington—Atlantic City, PA—NJ—DE—MD
11	Pike Creek	New Castle County	$32,939	$71,655	$84,076	19,751	8,201	Philadelphia—Wilimington—Atlantic City, PA—NJ—DE—MD
12	Lewes	Sussex County	$32,685	$48,707	$59,605	2,932	1,338	Salisbury, MD—DE
13	Ardencroft	New Castle County	$30,480	$56,875	$59,605	267	112	Philadelphia—Wilimington—Atlantic City, PA—NJ—DE—MD
14	Arden	New Castle County	$30,422	$56,732	$70,893	474	229	Philadelphia—Wilimington—Atlantic City, PA—NJ—DE—MD
15	Odessa	New Castle County	$27,662	$53,269	$55,938	286	119	Philadelphia—Wilimington—Atlantic City, PA—NJ—DE—MD
16	Slaughter Beach	Sussex County	$27,290	$41,250	$50,625	198	108	Salisbury, MD—DE
17	Ocean View	Sussex County	$27,188	$47,500	$52,125	1,006	458	Salisbury, MD—DE
18	Highland Acres	Kent County	$27,013	$64,716	$71,974	3,379	1,254	Dover, DE
19	Bethel	Sussex County	$25,254	$34,107	$58,750	184	78	Salisbury, MD—DE
20	Long Neck	Sussex County	$25,172	$34,688	$47,917	1,629	817	Salisbury, MD—DE
21	Glasgow	New Castle County	$24,795	$61,707	$67,252	12,840	4,517	Philadelphia—Wilimington—Atlantic City, PA—NJ—DE—MD
22	New Castle	New Castle County	$24,052	$52,449	$56,368	54,862	32,012	Philadelphia—Wilimington—Atlantic City, PA—NJ—DE—MD
23	Woodside	Kent County	$23,399	$54,250	$53,750	184	70	Dover, DE
24	Riverview	Kent County	$22,766	$64,219	$66,250	1,583	560	Dover, DE
25	Bellefonte	New Castle County	$22,661	$49,231	$59,375	1,249	537	Philadelphia—Wilimington—Atlantic City, PA—NJ—DE—MD
26	Edgemoor	New Castle County	$22,081	$39,931	$45,903	5,992	2,507	Philadelphia—Wilimington—Atlantic City, PA—NJ—DE—MD
27	Delaware City	New Castle County	$21,992	$43,611	$50,294	1,453	567	Philadelphia—Wilimington—Atlantic City, PA—NJ—DE—MD
28	Viola	Kent County	$21,687	$47,813	$49,531	156	62	Dover, DE
29	Bowers	Kent County	$21,404	$37,031	$45,625	305	138	Dover, DE
30	Dagsboro	Sussex County	$21,322	$37,596	$43,750	519	226	Salisbury, MD—DE
31	Wyoming	Kent County	$21,254	$48,452	$54,265	1,141	448	Dover, DE
32	Millville	Sussex County	$21,250	$36,932	$45,417	259	111	Salisbury, MD—DE
33	Camden	Kent County	$21,113	$47,097	$50,347	2,100	835	Dover, DE
34	Bear	New Castle County	$20,715	$53,240	$57,509	17,593	6,027	Philadelphia—Wilimington—Atlantic City, PA—NJ—DE—MD
35	Newark	New Castle County	$20,376	$48,758	$75,188	28,547	8,989	Philadelphia—Wilimington—Atlantic City, PA—NJ—DE—MD
36	Wilmington	New Castle County	$20,236	$35,116	$40,241	72,664	28,617	Philadelphia—Wilimington—Atlantic City, PA—NJ—DE—MD
37	Claymont	New Castle County	$20,211	$40,813	$46,780	9,220	3,792	Philadelphia—Wilimington—Atlantic City, PA—NJ—DE—MD
38	Newport	New Castle County	$19,590	$38,864	$41,771	1,122	456	Philadelphia—Wilimington—Atlantic City, PA—NJ—DE—MD
39	Brookside	New Castle County	$19,527	$50,107	$55,077	14,806	5,465	Philadelphia—Wilimington—Atlantic City, PA—NJ—DE—MD
40	Dover	Kent County	$19,445	$38,669	$48,338	32,135	12,340	Dover, DE
41	Wilmington Manor	New Castle County	$18,934	$43,434	$48,920	8,262	3,040	Philadelphia—Wilimington—Atlantic City, PA—NJ—DE—MD
42	Elsmere	New Castle County	$18,643	$39,415	$46,357	5,800	2,299	Philadelphia—Wilimington—Atlantic City, PA—NJ—DE—MD
43	Kent Acres	Kent County	$18,576	$43,261	$47,692	1,637	649	Dover, DE
44	Middletown	New Castle County	$18,517	$41,663	$47,270	6,161	2,298	Philadelphia—Wilimington—Atlantic City, PA—NJ—DE—MD
45	Clayton	Kent County	$18,268	$43,462	$48,000	1,273	499	Dover, DE
46	Felton	Kent County	$17,854	$42,589	$44,875	784	297	Dover, DE
47	Townsend	New Castle County	$17,671	$47,500	$48,875	346	132	Philadelphia—Wilimington—Atlantic City, PA—NJ—DE—MD
48	Smyrna	Kent County	$17,443	$36,212	$42,355	5,679	2,114	Dover, DE
49	Milton	Sussex County	$17,016	$32,368	$40,313	1,657	700	Salisbury, MD—DE
50	Magnolia	Kent County	$17,001	$39,917	$45,000	226	86	Dover, DE
51	Selbyville	Sussex County	$16,965	$36,250	$41,522	1,645	615	Salisbury, MD—DE
52	Farmington	Kent County	$16,423	$41,458	$38,750	75	31	Dover, DE
53	Milford	Kent County	$16,181	$32,525	$40,333	6,733	2,665	Dover, DE
54	Rodney Village	Kent County	$15,946	$40,875	$41,767	1,602	596	Dover, DE
55	Houston	Kent County	$15,919	$39,545	$46,563	430	151	Dover, DE
56	Kenton	Kent County	$15,539	$38,250	$38,000	237	83	Dover, DE
57	Georgetown	Sussex County	$15,288	$31,875	$37,925	4,643	1,489	Salisbury, MD—DE
58	Millsboro	Sussex County	$15,157	$27,379	$32,708	2,360	1,045	Salisbury, MD—DE
59	Delmar	Sussex County	$15,060	$26,818	$35,521	1,407	542	Salisbury, MD—DE
60	Harrington	Kent County	$15,049	$30,945	$36,815	3,174	1,223	Dover, DE
61	Seaford	Sussex County	$15,022	$28,402	$39,688	6,699	2,629	Salisbury, MD—DE
62	Bridgeville	Sussex County	$14,965	$26,579	$30,083	1,436	570	Salisbury, MD—DE
63	Ellendale	Sussex County	$14,831	$37,083	$42,841	327	113	Salisbury, MD—DE
64	Cheswold	Kent County	$14,588	$38,750	$32,045	313	116	Dover, DE
65	Frederica	Kent County	$14,118	$30,781	$41,389	648	246	Dover, DE
66	Greenwood	Sussex County	$13,918	$35,588	$40,000	837	335	Salisbury, MD—DE
67	Rising Sun-Lebanon	Kent County	$13,868	$37,315	$40,658	2,458	829	Dover, DE
68	Leipsic	Kent County	$13,825	$37,656	$39,219	203	79	Dover, DE
69	Frankford	Sussex County	$13,711	$35,333	$35,729	714	227	Salisbury, MD—DE
70	Laurel	Sussex County	$13,594	$28,321	$30,329	3,668	1,389	Salisbury, MD—DE
71	Woodside East	Kent County	$13,542	$32,431	$32,344	2,174	752	Dover, DE
72	Blades	Sussex County	$13,495	$28,864	$33,194	956	353	Salisbury, MD—DE
73	Little Creek	Kent County	$13,418	$39,375	$41,563	195	67	Dover, DE
74	Dover Air Force Base	Kent County	$12,119	$34,318	$34,659	3,394	1,032	Dover, DE
75	Hartly	Kent County	$11,516	$29,375	$29,375	78	25	Dover, DE
