= List of census-designated places in Delaware =

Map of the United States with Delaware highlighted

This is a list of census-designated places in Delaware. The United States Census Bureau defines census-designated places as unincorporated communities lacking elected municipal officers and boundaries with legal status.

As of the 2020 census, Delaware has 22 census-designated places, up from 19 in the 2010 census.

== Census-designated places ==
| Name | County | Population (2020) | Area (2020) | | Coordinates |
| Name | County | Population (2020) | sq mi | km^{2} | Coordinates |
|---|---|---|---|---|---|
| Bear | New Castle | 23,060 | 5.78 | 15.0 | 39°37′45″N 75°39′30″W |
| Brookside | New Castle | 14,974 | 3.89 | 10.1 | 39°40′01″N 75°43′37″W |
| Claymont | New Castle | 9,895 | 2.15 | 5.6 | 39°48′02″N 75°27′35″W |
| Dover Base Housing | Kent | 2,810 | 0.7 | 1.8 | 39°07′42″N 75°27′53″W |
| Edgemoor | New Castle | 6,635 | 2.18 | 5.6 | 39°45′00″N 75°29′59″W |
| Glasgow | New Castle | 15,288 | 9.93 | 25.7 | 39°36′17″N 75°44′43″W |
| Greenville | New Castle | 3,104 | 2.81 | 7.3 | 39°46′44″N 75°35′54″W |
| Highland Acres | Kent | 3,492 | 1.51 | 3.9 | 39°07′15″N 75°31′19″W |
| Hockessin | New Castle | 13,478 | 10.05 | 26.0 | 39°47′15″N 75°41′48″W |
| Kent Acres | Kent | 2,144 | 0.93 | 2.4 | 39°07′54″N 75°31′30″W |
| Lincoln | Sussex | 894 | 2.81 | 7.3 | 38°52′11″N 75°25′23″W |
| Long Neck | Sussex | 3,017 | 3.13 | 8.1 | 38°37′12″N 75°09′03″W |
| North Star | New Castle | 8,056 | 6.80 | 17.6 | 39°45′40″N 75°43′09″W |
| Pike Creek | New Castle | 7,808 | 2.69 | 7.0 | 39°43′51″N 75°42′15″W |
| Pike Creek Valley | New Castle | 11,692 | 2.87 | 7.4 | 39°44′10″N 75°41′54″W |
| Port Penn | New Castle | 162 | 0.5 | 1.3 | 39°31′00″N 75°34′36″W |
| Rising Sun-Lebanon | Kent | 4,104 | 3.61 | 9.3 | 39°05′59″N 75°30′18″W |
| Riverview | Kent | 2,458 | 3.69 | 9.6 | 39°01′35″N 75°30′39″W |
| Rodney Village | Kent | 1,489 | 0.59 | 1.5 | 39°07′55″N 75°31′57″W |
| Saint Georges | New Castle | 1,957 | 1.45 | 3.8 | 39°33′18″N 75°39′01″W |
| Wilmington Manor | New Castle | 8,162 | 1.63 | 4.2 | 39°41′12″N 75°35′04″W |
| Woodside East | Kent | 2,570 | 1.71 | 4.4 | 39°04′03″N 75°32′15″W |

== See also ==
- List of counties in Delaware
- List of municipalities in Delaware
