= Caesar Rodney School District =

American school district

The Caesar Rodney School District (CRSD) is a public school district based in Wyoming, Delaware (USA). The current superintendent is Dr. Corey Miklus.

== History ==
It was established on July 1, 1915, as State Consolidated District No. 1. The school board later chose the name Caesar Rodney as its namesake and it became the Caesar Rodney Consolidated School District. It merged with six other school districts to form the Caesar Rodney Special School District on July 1, 1919. The Comegys District merged into the Caesar Rodney district in 1937, and 11 other school districts merged into Caesar Rodney from 1919 until 1969. In 1969 the district assumed its current name as the Delaware Legislature forced the Magnolia and Oak Point school districts to merge into Caesar Rodney.

School districts that merged into the district included 14. Comegys/St. Jones, 20. Oak Point, 21. Oak Shade, 22. Camden, 22 1/2. Camden, 24. Petersburg, 25. Dupont, 27. Rising Sun/Lebanon, 27 1/2. Rising Sun/Lebanon, 50. Magnolia, 52. Willow Grove, 53. Frazier, 59. Pratts, 69. Westville, 71. Woodside, 74. Cedar Grove, 86. Logans, 99. duPont, 99 1/2. duPont, 106. Willow Grove, 108. Magnolia, 113. Wyoming, 113 1/2. Wyoming, 122. Rising Sun/Lebanon, 131. Woodside, 150. Star Hill, 151 Wyoming-Camden, 152 Willow Grove, 153. Thompson/Marydel/Parker's Chapel, and 154. Woodside. 23. Sandtown and 155. Mt. Olive were split between Caesar Rodney and Lake Forest. In Kent County, the former school districts numbered 133 and higher were designated for African-Americans during educational segregation in the United States.

== Geography ==
The district covers a 107-square-mile (280 km^{2}) area in central Kent County.

In addition to Wyoming, other communities served by the district include Camden, Highland Acres, Kent Acres, Magnolia, Rising Sun-Lebanon, Rodney Village, Woodside, most of Woodside East, a small portion of Riverview, and the southern part of the state capital, Dover. The Dover Air Force Base also lies within the district. It also includes Marydel and Wild Quail.

== Schools ==
High school

- Caesar Rodney High School

Middle schools

- Dover Air Base Middle School
- Fred Fifer III Middle School
- Magnolia Middle School
- Postlethwait (F. Niel) Middle School

Elementary schools

- Frear (Allen) Elementary School
- Robinson (David E.) Elementary School
- Simpson (W.B.) Elementary School
- Star Hill Elementary School
- Stokes (Nellie H.) Elementary School
- Welch (George) Elementary School

Early childhood centers

- McIlvaine Early Childhood Centers

Special schools

- Caesar Rodney Early Intervention Programs (for students with special needs)

== Athletics ==
The Riders have a history as one of the highest performing Delawarean wrestling schools. In 2008, they also won the Football State Championship over Sussex Central High. Postlethwait and Fifer Middle Schools share the Riders mascot with the high school. Caesar Rodney competes in athletics as a member of the Henlopen Conference.

== Alumni ==
- Ian Snell, former MLB player
- Duron Harmon, New England Patriots defensive back
- Laron Profit, former NBA player
- Ashley Coleman, Miss Teen USA 1999
- Dave Williams, former MLB player
- Natalie Morales, television journalist for NBC News

== See also ==
- List of school districts in Delaware
- Caesar Rodney
