= Lake Forest High School =

Lake Forest High School may refer to:

- Lake Forest High School (Illinois), Lake Forest, Lake County, Illinois
- Lake Forest High School (Delaware), near Felton in Kent County, Delaware
