= Laron Profit =

American basketball player (born 1977)

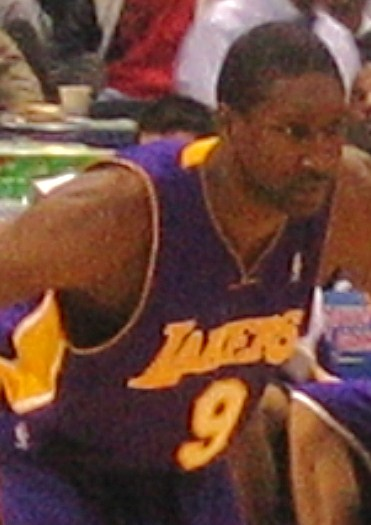
- Profit with the Los Angeles Lakers in 2005

Personal information
- Born: August 5, 1977 (age 49) Charleston, South Carolina, U.S.
- Listed height: 6 ft 5 in (1.96 m)
- Listed weight: 204 lb (93 kg)

Career information
- High school: Caesar Rodney (Camden, Delaware)
- College: Maryland (1995–1999)
- NBA draft: 1999: 2nd round, 38th overall pick
- Drafted by: Orlando Magic
- Playing career: 1999–2010
- Position: Guard / small forward
- Number: 3, 7, 9
- Coaching career: 2012–2016

Career history

Playing
- 1999–2001: Washington Wizards
- 2002: Premiata Montegranaro
- 2003–2004: Guangdong Southern Tigers
- 2004–2005: Washington Wizards
- 2005–2006: Los Angeles Lakers
- 2006–2007: Efes Pilsen
- 2007: Grises de Humacao
- 2008–2010: Libertad de Sunchales

Coaching
- 2012–2016: Orlando Magic (assistant)

Career highlights
- Argentine League Finals MVP (2008); Argentine League champion (2008); CBA champion (2004); 3× Third-team All-ACC (1997–1999)
- Stats at NBA.com
- Stats at Basketball Reference

Bronta Laron Profit (born August 5, 1977) is an American former professional basketball player and coach.

== Early life and college ==
Profit was born in Charleston, South Carolina. Because his stepfather James Truiett served in the United States Air Force, Profit lived in various Air Force bases as a child including Kirtland Air Force Base in Albuquerque, New Mexico, Howard Air Force Base in the Panama Canal Zone, Dover Air Force Base in Dover, Delaware. In 1995, Profit graduated from Caesar Rodney High School in Camden, Delaware as an honor student who scored over 1000 on his first attempt at the SAT exam.

From 1995 to 1999, Profit attended the University of Maryland, College Park. With the Maryland Terrapins basketball team, Profit played as a small forward and earned all-conference all four seasons: Honorable Mention All-ACC as a freshman then for his other three seasons third-team All-ACC. In his junior year, Profit led the ACC in steals with 2.7 steals per game and led the Terrapins in scoring with 15.8 points per game. Profit was an honorable mention All-American as a junior. In his senior year, Profit averaged 12.6 points, 4.6 rebounds, and 2.3 assists per game.

== Professional career ==
=== First stint with Wizards (1999–2001) ===
In the 1999 NBA draft, the Orlando Magic selected Profit in the second round as the 38th pick overall. Profit hoped to transition to a shooting guard professionally. On September 22, 1999, the Magic traded Profit to the Washington Wizards for a second-round draft pick in the 2001 NBA draft.

In his rookie season (1999–2000) with the Wizards, Profit played in 33 games, averaging 1.5 points and 6.8 minutes, and missed 21 games due to tendinitis in a knee. On April 18, 2000, Profit scored a season-high 10 points against the Boston Celtics. The following season, Profit played in 35 games and started the final 12 games of the regular season. Profit averaged 9.7 points, 5.8 assists, and 3.9 rebounds and scored a season-high 18 points twice. Against the Houston Rockets on March 31, 2001, Profit reached season highs in steals (7) and rebounds (8). On April 14 against the Chicago Bulls, Profit had his first double-double in his career from scoring 12 points and a season-high 14 assists.

The Wizards traded Profit to the Orlando Magic, the team that originally drafted Profit, for the draft rights to Brendan Haywood on August 1, 2001. The Magic waived Profit on October 15, and team general manager John Gabriel explained that releasing Profit was the cost of trading the first-round pick Haywood.

=== First international stint (2002–2004) ===
Profit would then play internationally from 2002 to 2004. Starting in January 2002, Profit played six games with Premiata Montegranaro of the Italian Lega Basket Serie A and averaged 13.7 points, 2.8 rebounds, 1.2 assists, and 2.2 steals. From January 2003 to 2004, Profit played with the Guangdong Southern Tigers of the Chinese Basketball Association (CBA). In his second season with the Southern Tigers, Profit averaged 5.1 points and 1.8 rebounds per game. The Guangdong Southern Tigers also won the CBA championship in 2004. During his stint abroad, Profit also attended training camp with the NBA's Milwaukee Bucks in October 2002 and participated with the Philadelphia 76ers in 2003 NBA Summer League.

=== Second stint with Wizards (2004–2005) ===
On October 1, 2004, Profit re-signed with the Washington Wizards as a free agent. Profit scored 11 points in the October 21 preseason 92–83 victory over the defending champion Detroit Pistons. Because he had to fill in roles for injured players and was a free agent who had not played an NBA game in over two years, Profit played longer than expected in that game. After cutting Billy Thomas, the Wizards awarded Profit the 15th and final team roster spot.

Entering the 2004–05 season, the Wizards had only eight available players for opening night, and four (including leading scorers Gilbert Arenas and Larry Hughes) were serving suspensions. Despite these shortcomings, the Wizards rallied from a 19-point deficit to defeat the Memphis Grizzlies 102–91 on the season opener of November 3, 2004. Profit led the Wizards in assists (with 6) and scored 11 points. On March 5, 2005, Profit made the winning tip shot with 3.1 seconds left for the Wizards to defeat the Charlotte Bobcats 86–84. After All-Star forward Antawn Jamison left the game during the third quarter with a sore knee, Wizards coach Eddie Jordan kept Profit for the rest of the game. The Wizards made the NBA Playoffs in 2005 for the first time in eight seasons and had not won a playoff game since 1988. Ultimately, the number-one Eastern Conference team Miami Heat swept the Wizards in four games in the 2005 Eastern Conference Semifinals. Profit played in 42 games (including 4 starts) with Washington during the breakout 2004–05 season and averaged 3.2 points, 1.8 rebounds, and 0.9 assists.

=== Los Angeles Lakers (2005–2006) ===
On August 2, 2005, the Washington Wizards traded Profit and Kwame Brown to the Los Angeles Lakers for Caron Butler and Chucky Atkins. Profit played in 25 games and started one game. In his one start, the November 20, 2005 loss to the Chicago Bulls, Profit played 18 minutes, scored two points off free throws, and made two defensive rebounds and one assist. On December 21, 2005, Profit suffered a season-ending ruptured achilles tendon after substituting into a game for Kobe Bryant, who had just scored 62 points in 3 quarters against the Dallas Mavericks. The Lakers waived Profit on January 17, 2006, to make room for rookie Ronny Turiaf.

=== Second international stint (2006–2010) ===
On December 12, 2006, Anadolu Efes S.K. of the Turkish Basketball League signed Profit to a one-month contract with a full-season option. In seven games with Anadolu Efes, Profit averaged 3.1 points, 3.1 rebounds, and 1.3 assists. Efes released Profit in mid-February 2007.

Profit later joined the team Grises de Humacao, part of the Puerto Rican league BSN, wearing jersey #7. In his debut with Grises on April 25, 2007, Profit had 15 points, 8 rebounds, and 4 assists in the loss. He suffered a torn hamstring in early May 2007. However, Profit later returned in mid-month and scored 23 points in a 105–97 win over Cangrejeros de Santurce on May 14. In a May 18 overtime loss, Profit scored 26. Grises waived Profit by the end of the month. In the 2007 season, Profit played 10 games and averaged 18.5 points, 7.3 rebounds, and 2.4 assists.

Club Deportivo Libertad of the Argentine LNB signed Profit on February 7, 2008. The team won the LNB championship in 2008.

== Coaching career ==
Profit joined the Orlando Magic as an assistant coach on August 30, 2012.

== Hall of Fame ==
In 2016 Profit was inducted into the Delaware Sports Hall of Fame.

== NBA career statistics ==
Legend
GP	Games played	GS	Games started	MPG	Minutes per game
FG%	Field goal percentage	3P%	3-point field goal percentage	FT%	Free throw percentage
RPG	Rebounds per game	APG	Assists per game	SPG	Steals per game
BPG	Blocks per game	PPG	Points per game	**Bold**	Career high

=== Regular season ===
Year	Team	GP	GS	MPG	FG%	3P%	FT%	RPG	APG	SPG	BPG	PPG
1999–00	Washington	33	1	6.8	.356	.176	.400	.8	.8	.2	.1	1.5
2000–01	Washington	35	**12**	**17.3**	.394	.269	.733	**1.8**	**2.5**	**1.0**	**.3**	**4.3**
2004–05	Washington	**42**	4	10.2	.438	**.286**	.640	**1.8**	.9	.4	.1	3.2
2005–06	L. A. Lakers	25	1	11.2	**.476**	.167	**.875**	1.7	.6	.4	.2	4.2
Career		135	18	11.4	.419	.236	.712	1.5	1.2	.5	.2	3.3

=== Playoffs ===
Year	Team	GP	GS	MPG	FG%	3P%	FT%	RPG	APG	SPG	BPG	PPG
2005	Washington	3	0	1.7	.000	—	—	.3	.3	.0	.0	.0
