= Canterbury, Delaware =

Unincorporated community in Delaware, United States

- Unincorporated community
- Location within Delaware Location within the United States
- Coordinates: 39°2′33″N 75°33′20″W
- Country: United States
- State: Delaware
- County: Kent
- Elevation: 52 ft (16 m)
- Time zone: UTC-5 (Eastern (EST))
  - Summer (DST): UTC-4 (EDT)
- Area code: 302
- GNIS feature ID: 216055

Canterbury is an unincorporated community in Kent County, Delaware, United States. Canterbury is located at the intersection of U.S. Route 13 and Delaware Route 15 south of Woodside, north of Felton, and east of Viola.

== History ==
The community was named for the city of Canterbury in England. Canterbury was an important horse changeover along the north–south stagecoach line on the Delmarva Peninsula.

Canterbury's population was 160 in 1890, 162 in 1900, and just 23 in 1960.
