= Woodside Methodist Episcopal Church =

Historic church in Delaware, United States

- U.S. National Register of Historic Places
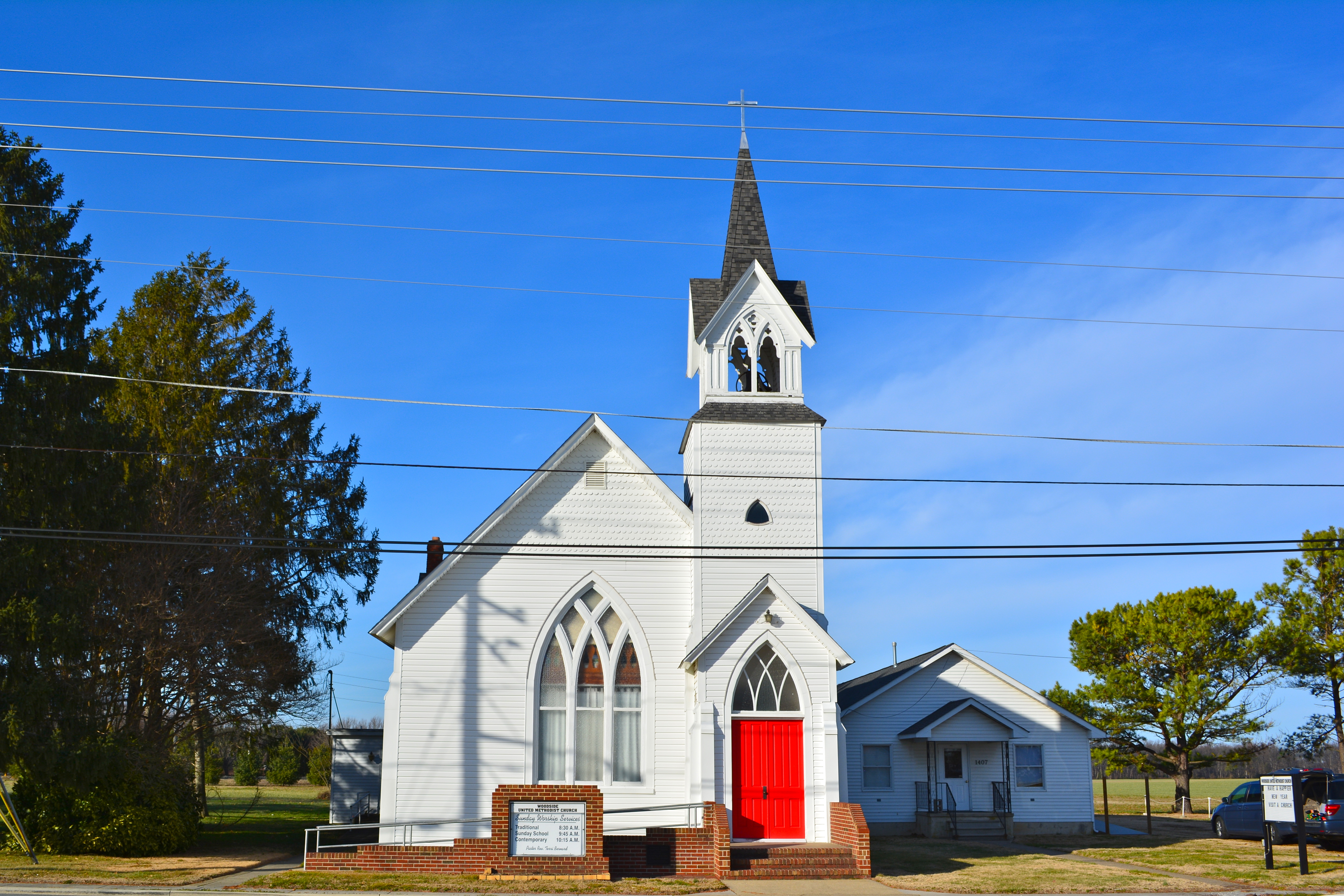
- In 2014

- Location within Delaware Location within the United States
- Location: Main St., North Murderkill Hundred, Woodside, Delaware
- Coordinates: 39°4′19″N 75°34′3″W
- Area: 0.5 acres (0.20 ha)
- Built: 1889
- Architect: Townsend, B.W., and Bro.
- Architectural style: Late Gothic Revival
- NRHP reference No.: 96000107
- Added to NRHP: February 16, 1996

Woodside Methodist Episcopal Church, also known as Woodside United Methodist Church, is a historic Methodist church located on Main Street, and North Murderkill Hundred in Woodside, Kent County, Delaware. It was built in 1889, and is a rectangular frame building in the Late Gothic Revival style. It measures 50 feet, 4 inches, deep by 30 feet, 6 inches wide. It has a steeply pitched gable roof and features a bell tower capped with a steepled, square belfry.

It was added to the National Register of Historic Places in 1996.
