= Brecknock (Camden, Delaware) =

Historic house in Delaware, United States

- U.S. National Register of Historic Places
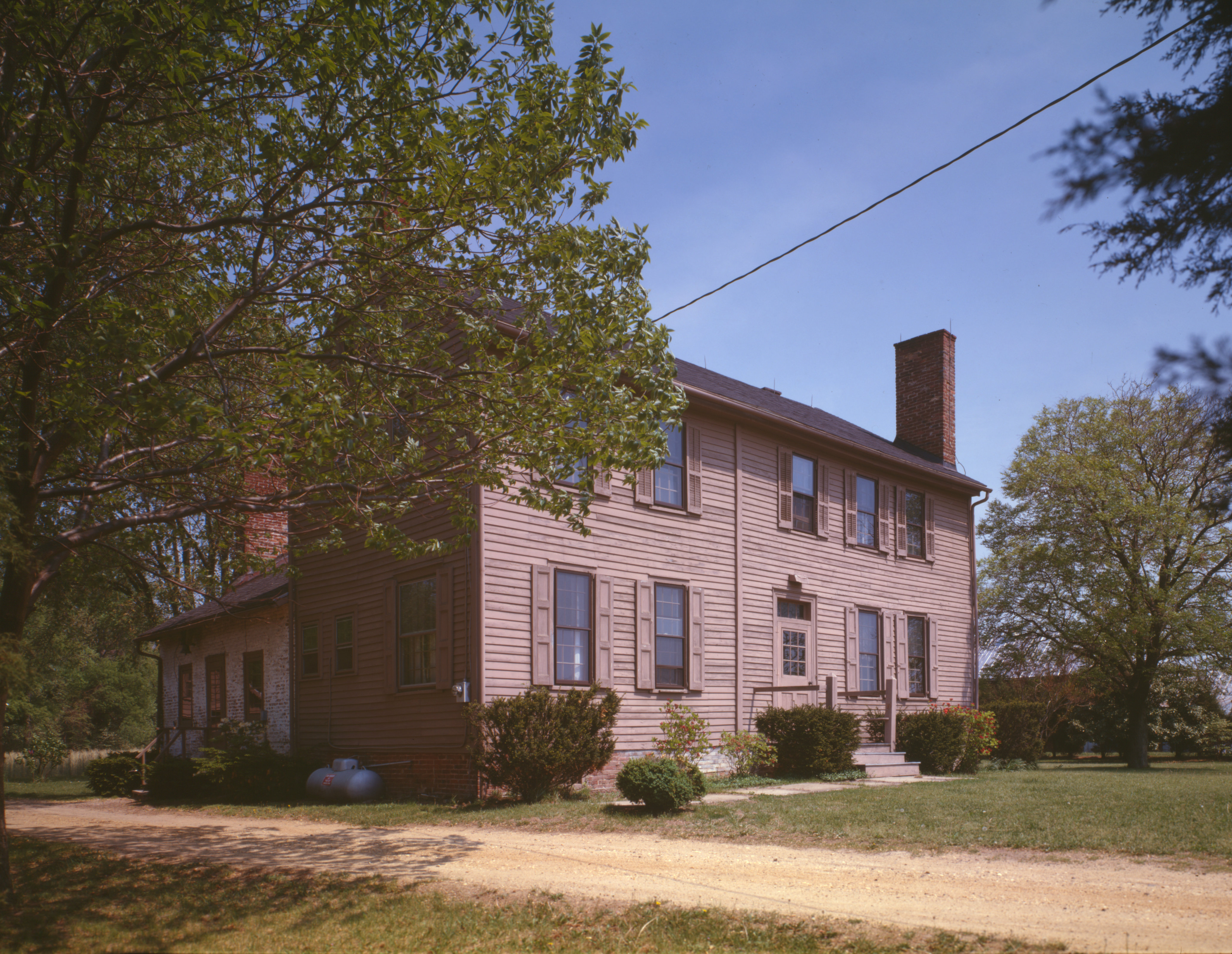
- Brecknock, HABS Photo, May 1982

- Location within Delaware Location within the United States
- Location: 0.5 miles north of Camden off U.S. Route 13, near Camden, Delaware
- Coordinates: 39°7′26″N 75°32′10″W
- Area: 5 acres (2.0 ha)
- Built: 1700
- NRHP reference No.: 74000596
- Added to NRHP: December 24, 1974

Brecknock, also known as the Howell's Mill Seat, is a historic home located near Camden, Kent County, Delaware. The house is in four sections; two of brick and two frame. The original one-room house possibly dates before 1700 and is constructed of brick. A brick section was added in the 1740s. The 2 1/2-story, frame, main house was added in the mid-18th century and abuts the second brick section. The final frame section was added in the 1880s and is a four-room apartment originally built for the wagon driver, but later incorporated into the house.

It was added to the National Register of Historic Places in 1974.
