= Natalie Morales (journalist) =

American journalist (born 1972)

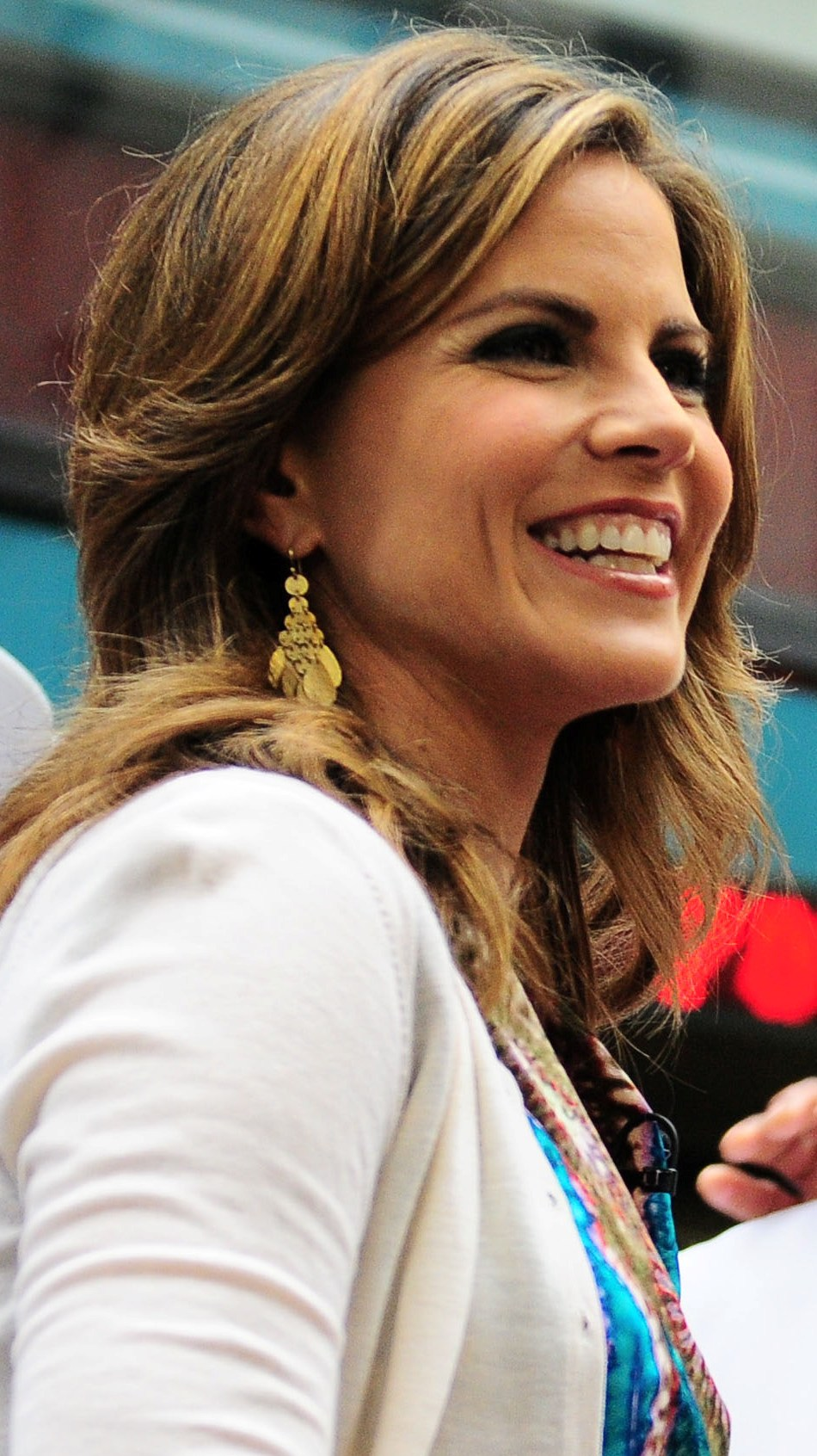
- Morales in May 2011
- Born: Natalie Leticia Morales; June 6, 1972 (age 54); Taipei, Taiwan
- Education: Rutgers University
- Occupation: Journalist
- Years active: 1994–present
- Notable credit(s): Today co-anchor and national correspondent (2006–2011); Today news anchor and third hour co-anchor (2011–2016); Today West Coast anchor (2016–2021); Access Hollywood host (2016–2019); The Talk co-host and moderator (2021–2024)
- Spouse: Joseph Rhodes (m. 1998)
- Children: 2
- Website: Today: Natalie Morales

Natalie Morales-Rhodes (born Natalie Leticia Morales; June 6, 1972) is an American journalist who recently was a co-host and moderator of the CBS Daytime talk show The Talk. Prior to that, Morales worked for NBC News for 22 years in various roles as the West Coast anchor of Today and appeared on Dateline NBC and NBC Nightly News.

In August 2016, after the Rio Summer Olympics, Morales moved to Los Angeles, where she became both the West Coast anchor of Today, and Billy Bush's replacement as host of Access Hollywood and Access Hollywood Live, while continuing as a correspondent for Dateline.

In addition to her other duties, she also hosts the Reelz series Behind Closed Doors with Natalie Morales.

== Early life ==
Morales was born in Taiwan, to a Brazilian mother, Penelope, and a Puerto Rican father, Lieutenant Colonel Mario Morales, Jr. She speaks Spanish and Portuguese and spent the first eighteen years of her life living in the United States and overseas in Panama, Brazil, and Spain as a "U.S. Air Force brat". She graduated in 1990 from Caesar Rodney High School located in Camden, Delaware.

Morales holds a Bachelor of Arts degree from Rutgers University with dual majors in Journalism & Media Studies and Latin American studies. She was a member of Phi Beta Kappa and graduated summa cum laude.

== Career ==
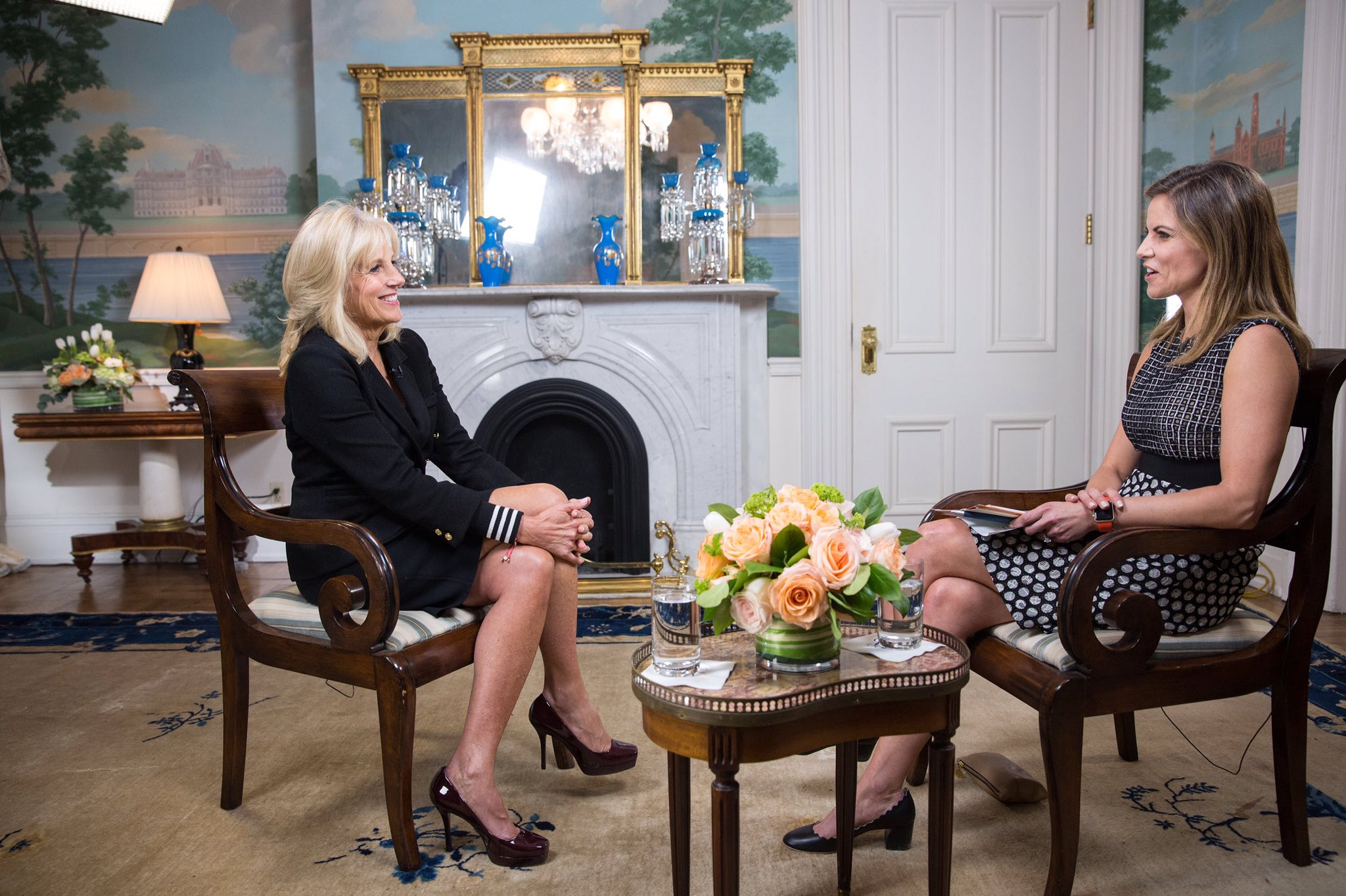
Morales interviewing Jill Biden at the White House in 2016.

Following college, Morales worked at Chase Bank before pursuing her journalism career. She began her on-air career at News 12 – The Bronx as the first morning anchor under News 12 - The Bronx's first news director Roberto Soto, and original studio directors Tom D’Elia, Brian Webb, Darryl Stith, and David Rein. She also served as a camera operator, editor, and producer for that network.

Morales went on to serve as a weekend anchor/reporter and morning co-anchor at WVIT-TV in Hartford, Connecticut, where she reported on the Columbine shootings, Hurricane Floyd, the 2000 Presidential election and the September 11, 2001 attacks. She also co-hosted and reported for the Emmy-nominated documentary, Save Our Sound, a joint production with WNBC on preserving the Long Island Sound. In 1999, she was voted one of the 50 Most Influential Latinas for her news coverage and reports by the Hispanic daily newspaper El Diario La Prensa. Previously, Morales spent two years working behind the scenes at Court TV.

Morales was an anchor and correspondent for MSNBC from 2002 to 2006. She was named one of Hispanic Magazine’s Top Trendsetters of 2003.

Morales joined the Today show in 2006 as a national correspondent, and was named co-anchor of the third hour of the show in March 2008. In 2010, Morales served as the host for the one-off Sister Wives Special. On May 9, 2011, it was announced that Morales would replace Ann Curry as the news anchor for Today, when Curry succeeded Meredith Vieira as host of Today in June 2011. In 2016, it was announced that Morales would be moving west to host Access and become the West Coast anchor of Today. In 2019, Morales stepped away from hosting Access and remained on Today.

In October 2021, Morales left NBC News after 22 years; she then joined the CBS Daytime talk show The Talk as a permanent co-host and moderator, serving in this role until the show ended in December 2024. In October 2022, CBS announced that Morales would be joining CBS News as a correspondent, especially contributing stories to 48 Hours.

== Personal life ==
Morales married Joseph Rhodes on August 22, 1998. In 2002, they purchased a US$1 million townhouse in Hoboken, New Jersey, and expanded it in 2008 to 3,600 square feet. In June 2016, after Morales was made the West Coast anchor of Today, the family put the Hoboken townhouse on the market, and moved into a house in Brentwood, Los Angeles, California, the following month. By October, the townhouse had sold for $3.1 million.

In November 2003, Morales gave birth to a son via C-section at Hoboken's St. Mary Hospital. Their second son was born in late 2008.

Morales is an avid runner, having competed in five marathons, including three New York City Marathons. She has run and completed the 1995, 1996, and 2006 NYC Marathons. Morales also participates in triathlons. She has been featured in a full-length article and on the cover of the October 2010 issue of Triathlete Magazine.

Media offices
Preceded by Carrie Ann Inaba	The Talk co-host 2021-2024	Incumbent
