= Duron Harmon =

American football player (born 1991)

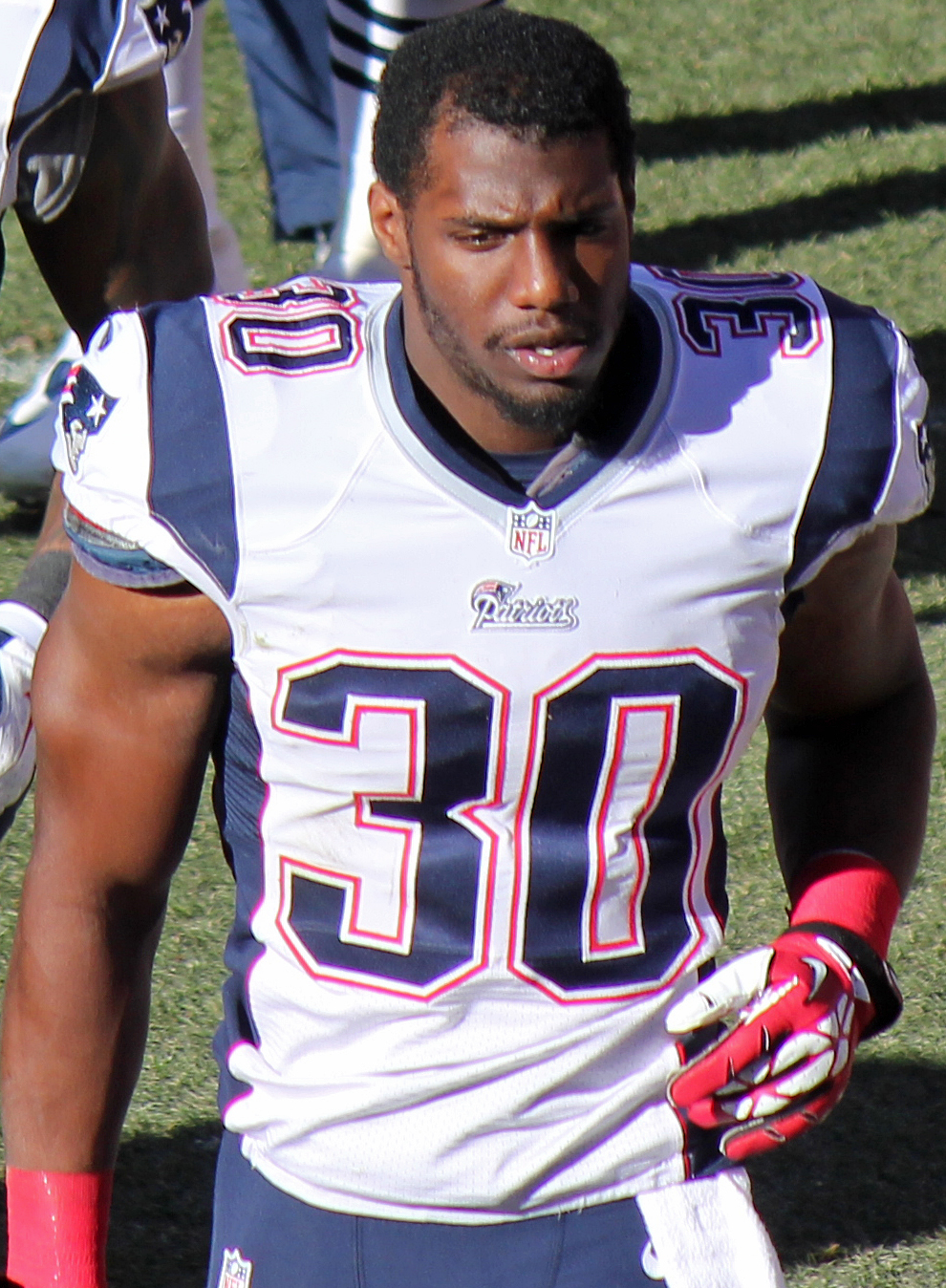
- Harmon with the New England Patriots in 2014

No. 21, 30, 26, 37
- Position: Safety

Personal information
- Born: January 24, 1991 (age 35); Magnolia, Delaware, U.S.
- Listed height: 6 ft 0 in (1.83 m)
- Listed weight: 205 lb (93 kg)

Career information
- High school: Caesar Rodney (Camden, Delaware)
- College: Rutgers (2009–2012)
- NFL draft: 2013: 3rd round, 91st overall pick

Career history
- New England Patriots (2013–2019); Detroit Lions (2020); Atlanta Falcons (2021); Las Vegas Raiders (2022); Baltimore Ravens (2023)*; Chicago Bears (2023); Cleveland Browns (2023)
- * Offseason or practice squad member only

Awards and highlights
- 3× Super Bowl champion (XLIX, LI, LIII); 2× First-team All-Big East (2011, 2012)

Career NFL statistics
- Total tackles: 423
- Sacks: 1
- Forced fumbles: 3
- Fumble recoveries: 3
- Interceptions: 24
- Pass deflections: 45
- Touchdowns: 1
- Stats at Pro Football Reference

Duron Harmon (born January 24, 1991) is an American former professional football player who was a safety for 11 seasons in the National Football League (NFL). He played college football for the Rutgers Scarlet Knights and was selected by the New England Patriots in the third round of the 2013 NFL draft. Harmon was nicknamed “the Closer” by fans and media for his ability to come up with late, game-sealing interceptions during his Patriots tenure. Harmon was also a member of the Detroit Lions, Atlanta Falcons, Las Vegas Raiders, Baltimore Ravens, Chicago Bears, and Cleveland Browns.

== Early life ==
Harmon was born on January 24, 1991, in Magnolia, Delaware. He attended Caesar Rodney High School in Camden, Delaware, where he played high school football.

== College career ==
While attending Rutgers University, Harmon played for the Scarlet Knights from 2009 to 2012. Following his senior season in 2012, Harmon was a first-team All-Big East Conference selection at safety and participated in the NFLPA Collegiate Bowl.

== Professional career ==
=== Pre-draft ===
Coming out of Rutgers, Harmon was not one of the 60 defensive backs to receive an invitation to the NFL Scouting Combine. On March 13, 2013, he was one of 17 prospects to attend Rutgers' Pro day. Harmon performed all of the required combine and positional drills for scouts and team representatives from all 32 NFL teams. At the conclusion of the pre-draft process, he was projected to be a seventh-round pick or undrafted free agent by NFL draft experts and scouts. Harmon was ranked the 16th-best strong safety prospect in the draft by DraftScout.com.

Pre-draft measurables
Height	Weight	Arm length	Hand span	Wingspan	40-yard dash	10-yard split	20-yard split	20-yard shuttle	Three-cone drill	Vertical jump	Broad jump	Bench press
6 ft 0 1/4 in (1.84 m)	196 lb (89 kg)	30 3/4 in (0.78 m)	9 3/8 in (0.24 m)	6 ft 2 7/8 in (1.90 m)	4.51 s	1.60 s	2.67 s	4.40 s	7.02 s	36 in (0.91 m)	10 ft 5 in (3.18 m)	15 reps
All values from Rutger's Pro Day

=== New England Patriots ===
==== 2013 ====
The New England Patriots selected Harmon in the third round (91st overall) of the 2013 NFL draft. He was the second defensive back selected by the Patriots, behind Logan Ryan (83rd overall). The selection of Harmon by the Patriots in the third round surprised many draft evaluators and analysts and was seen as a reach. When his selection was announced, ESPN and NFL Network failed to play Harmon's college highlights as typically done with draft announcements since they were not expecting him to be drafted.

On May 15, 2013, the Patriots signed Harmon to a four-year, $2.711 million contract that included a $533,600 signing bonus. Throughout training camp, Harmon competed against Adrian Wilson, Steve Gregory, and Tavon Wilson for the job as the starting strong safety after it was left vacant by the departure of Patrick Chung. Head coach Bill Belichick named Harmon the backup strong safety behind Steve Gregory to start the regular season.

After missing the season opener against the Buffalo Bills due to a hamstring injury, Harmon made his professional regular season debut during Week 2 against the New York Jets on Thursday Night Football and finished the 13–10 victory with a solo tackle. During a Week 7 30–27 road loss to the Jets, Harmon had a solo tackle and a pass deflection. In the next game against the Miami Dolphins, he recorded a pass deflection and his first NFL interception off of Ryan Tannehill during the 27–17 victory. The following week against the Pittsburgh Steelers, Harmon had four combined tackles (three solo), a pass deflection, and an interception in the 55–31 victory.

Following a Week 10 bye, the Patriots went on the road to face the Carolina Panthers on Monday Night Football. Harmon earned his first career start in place of Steve Gregory, who suffered a finger injury earlier in the week, and finished the 24–20 loss with three solo tackles. In the next game against the Denver Broncos, Harmon made his second consecutive start and recorded a season-high 11 combined tackles (seven solo) during the 34–31 comeback overtime victory. During a Week 16 41–7 road victory over the Baltimore Ravens, he had three combined tackles (two solo) and a pass deflection.

Harmon finished his rookie year with 31 combined tackles (24 solo), four pass deflections, and two interceptions in 15 games and three starts. The Patriots finished atop the AFC East with a 12–4 record and qualified for the playoffs as the #2-seed. In the playoffs, Harmon mainly saw action on special teams and recorded no statistics before the Patriots lost on the road to the Broncos in the AFC Championship Game.

==== 2014 ====
Entering training camp in 2014, Harmon was slated to be the starting strong safety after the departure of Steve Gregory. He competed against Kanorris Davis and Patrick Chung and ultimately lost the job to Chung and was relegated to backup strong safety.

During a Week 5 43–17 victory over the Cincinnati Bengals, Harmon had a fumble recovery. In the next game against the Bills, he recorded a season-high three combined tackles during the 37–22 road victory. During Week 15 against the Dolphins, Harmon had a pass deflection and an interception in the 41–13 victory.

Harmon finished his second professional season with 12 combined tackles (eight solo), a fumble recovery, a pass deflection, and an interception in 16 games and no starts. The Patriots finished atop the AFC East with a 12–4 record and qualified for the playoffs as the #1-seed. In the Divisional Round against the Ravens, Harmon recorded a solo tackle, a pass deflection, and an interception off of Joe Flacco during the 35–31 victory. After the game, Harmon stated: "That's the biggest pick of my life." The Patriots would go on to win Super Bowl XLIX over the Seattle Seahawks by a score of 28–24.

==== 2015 ====
In the 2015 season, Harmon was mainly used as the Patriots' third safety alongside Devin McCourty and Patrick Chung primarily in nickel and dime packages.

During the season-opener against the Steelers, Harmon recorded three combined tackles (two solo), a pass deflection, and an interception in the 28–21 victory. In the next game against the Bills, he had his second interception of the season during the 40–32 road victory.

During a Week 6 34–27 road victory over the Indianapolis Colts, Harmon had two solo tackles and a pass deflection. Two weeks later against the Jets on Thursday Night Football, he recorded a tackle, two pass deflections, and an interception in the 36–7 victory. During Week 16 against the Jets, Harmon had a season-high six combined tackles (four solo) in the 26–20 overtime road loss.

Harmon finished the 2015 season with 20 combined tackles (14 solo), five pass deflections, and three interceptions in 16 games and five starts. The Patriots finished atop the AFC East with a 12–4 record and qualified for the playoffs as the #2-seed. In the Divisional Round against the Kansas City Chiefs, Harmon recorded a pass deflection during the 27–20 victory.

==== 2016 ====
In the 2016 season, Harmon was once again used as the Patriots' primary third safety in nickel and dime packages.

During a Week 2 31–24 victory over the Dolphins, Harmon had a solo tackle, two pass deflections, and an interception. In the next game against the Houston Texans on Thursday Night Football, he recorded a solo tackle and a fumble recovery during the 27–0 shutout victory. During Week 11 against the San Francisco 49ers, Harmon had a season-high six solo tackles and a forced fumble in the 30–17 road victory.

Harmon finished the 2016 season with 29 combined tackles (24 solo), two pass deflections, an interception, a forced fumble, and a fumble recovery in 16 games and four starts. The Patriots finished atop the AFC East with a 14–2 record and qualified for the playoffs as the #1-seed. In the Divisional Round against the Texans, Harmon recorded a tackle, a pass deflection, and an interception off of Brock Osweiler during the 34–16 victory. During Super Bowl LI against the Atlanta Falcons, Harmon had three solo tackles in the 34–28 overtime victory. The game featured the largest comeback in Super Bowl history as the Patriots trailed by 25 points in the third quarter.

==== 2017 ====
On March 9, 2017, Harmon, who was a free agent at the time, signed a four-year contract worth a maximum of $20 million to remain with the Patriots. The deal included a $5 million signing bonus and $1.5 million in guaranteed salary. On September 5, 2017, Harmon was named a Patriots captain for the first time in his career.

During Week 3 against the Texans, Harmon recorded two solo tackles, a pass deflection, and his first interception of the season off of Deshaun Watson on the final play of the 36–33 comeback victory. Two weeks later against the Tampa Bay Buccaneers on Thursday Night Football, Harmon had a tackle and a pass deflection in the 19–14 road victory. In the next game against the Jets, he recorded three combined tackles (two solo) and a pass deflection during the 24–17 road victory.

During a Week 7 23–7 victory over the Falcons on Sunday Night Football, Harmon had a season-high four combined tackles (one solo) and a pass deflection. During Week 11 against the Oakland Raiders at Estadio Azteca, he recorded a solo tackle, a pass deflection, and an interception in the 33–8 victory. In the next game against the Dolphins, Harmon once again had a solo tackle, a pass deflection, and an interception during the 35–17 victory.

During Week 15 against the Steelers, Harmon made the game-sealing interception as the Patriots won 27–24, allowing them to clinch the AFC East. The interception was his fourth of the 2017 season, and his third in the final two minutes of a game. Harmon finished the 2017 season with 23 combined tackles (16 solo), seven pass deflections, and four interceptions in 16 games and three starts. The Patriots went on to finish the season with a 13–3 record and had home field advantage throughout the playoffs as the #1-seed. During Super Bowl LII against the Philadelphia Eagles, Harmon had five combined tackles (three solo), a pass deflection, and an interception in the 41–33 loss.

==== 2018 ====
Harmon switched his jersey number from No. 30 to No. 21 with the arrival of Jason McCourty and the departure of Malcolm Butler.

During a Week 2 31–20 road loss to the Jacksonville Jaguars, Harmon had two solo tackles and a fumble recovery. In the next game against the Detroit Lions on Sunday Night Football, he recorded a season-high eight combined tackles (seven solo) during the 26–10 road loss. Three weeks later against the Chiefs on Sunday Night Football, Harmon had three solo tackles, a pass deflection, and his first interception of the season off of Patrick Mahomes in the 43–40 victory.

During Week 13 against the Minnesota Vikings, Harmon recorded a solo tackle, a pass deflection, and an interception in the 24–10 victory. Two weeks later against the Steelers, he had a solo tackle, a season-high two pass deflections, and intercepted Ben Roethlisberger twice during the 17–10 road loss.

Harmon finished the 2018 season with 38 combined tackles (32 solo), four interceptions, four pass deflections, and a fumble recovery in 16 games and six starts. The Patriots finished atop the AFC East with an 11–5 record and qualified for the playoffs as the #2-seed. During Super Bowl LIII against the Los Angeles Rams, Harmon had a late hit that caused Brandin Cooks to drop a potential game-winning touchdown in the fourth quarter of the 13–3 victory.

==== 2019 ====
During Week 2 against the Dolphins, Harmon recorded two solo tackles and a pass deflection in the 43–0 shutout road victory. In the next game against the Jets, he once again had two solo tackles and a pass deflection during the 30–14 victory. Three weeks later against the New York Giants on Thursday Night Football, Harmon recorded two combined tackles (one solo) and his first interception of the season off Daniel Jones and returned it for 27 yards in the 35–14 victory.

During a Week 7 33–0 shutout road victory over the Jets on Monday Night Football, Harmon had a pass deflection and an interception. In the regular season finale against the Dolphins, he recorded two solo tackles and a pass deflection during the 27–24 loss.

Harmon finished the 2019 season with 22 combined tackles (19 solo), two interceptions, and five pass deflections in 16 games and eight starts. The Patriots finished atop the AFC East with a 12–4 record and qualified for the playoffs as the #3-seed. During the Wild Card Round against the Tennessee Titans, Harmon recorded two solo tackles, a pass deflection, and an interception in the 20–13 loss.

=== Detroit Lions ===
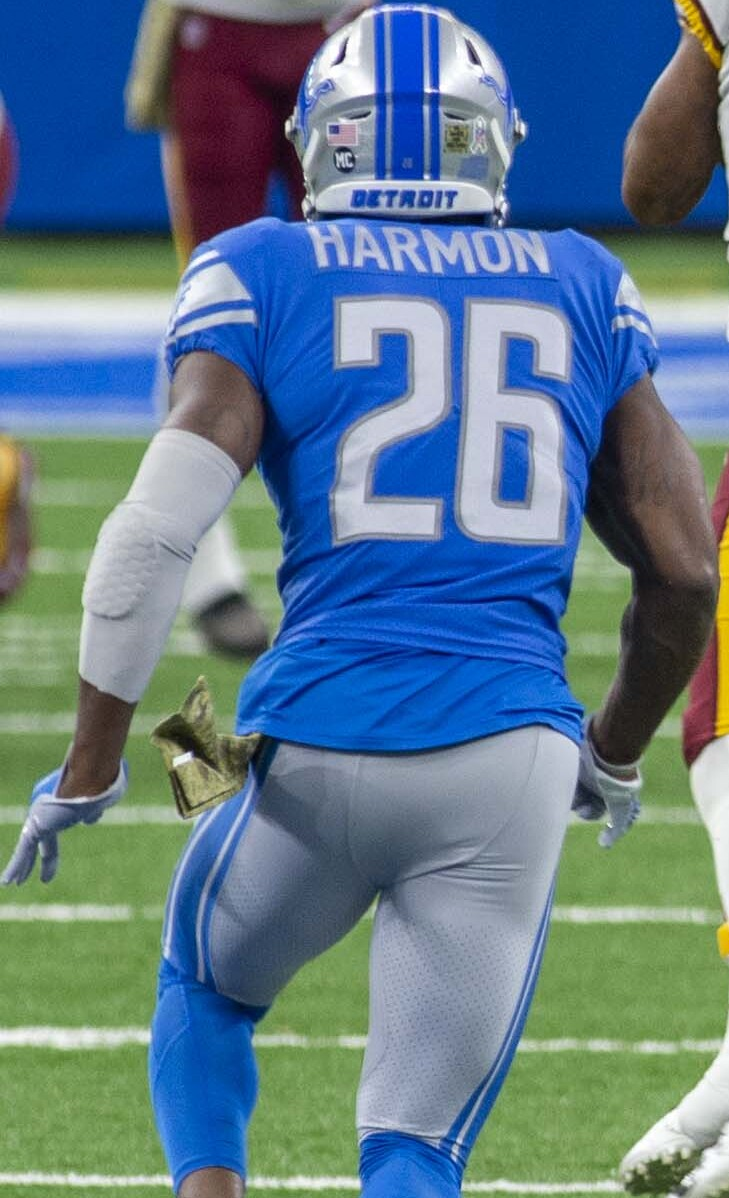
Harmon in 2020

On March 18, 2020, the Patriots traded Harmon and a seventh-round draft pick in 2020 to the Detroit Lions in exchange for the Seattle Seahawks' fifth-round 2020 draft pick. The trade reunited him with Lions head coach Matt Patricia, who was the defensive coordinator during Harmon's first five seasons with the Patriots.

Harmon made his Lions debut during the season opener against the Chicago Bears and finished the 27–23 loss with five combined tackles (four solo). In the next game against the Green Bay Packers, Harmon recorded four combined tackles (three solo) and a pass deflection during the 42–21 road loss. The following week against the Arizona Cardinals, Harmon had five combined tackles (three solo), a season-high two pass deflections, and his first interception of the season in the 26–23 road victory.

During a Week 6 34–16 road victory over the Jaguars, Harmon recorded a pass deflection and an interception. During Week 15 against the Titans, he had a season-high 10 combined tackles (five solo) in the 46–25 road loss. In the regular season finale against the Vikings, Harmon recorded a season-high nine solo tackles and a pass deflection during the narrow 37–35 loss.

Harmon finished the 2020 season with 73 combined tackles (54 solo), two interceptions, and five pass deflections in 16 games and starts.

=== Atlanta Falcons ===
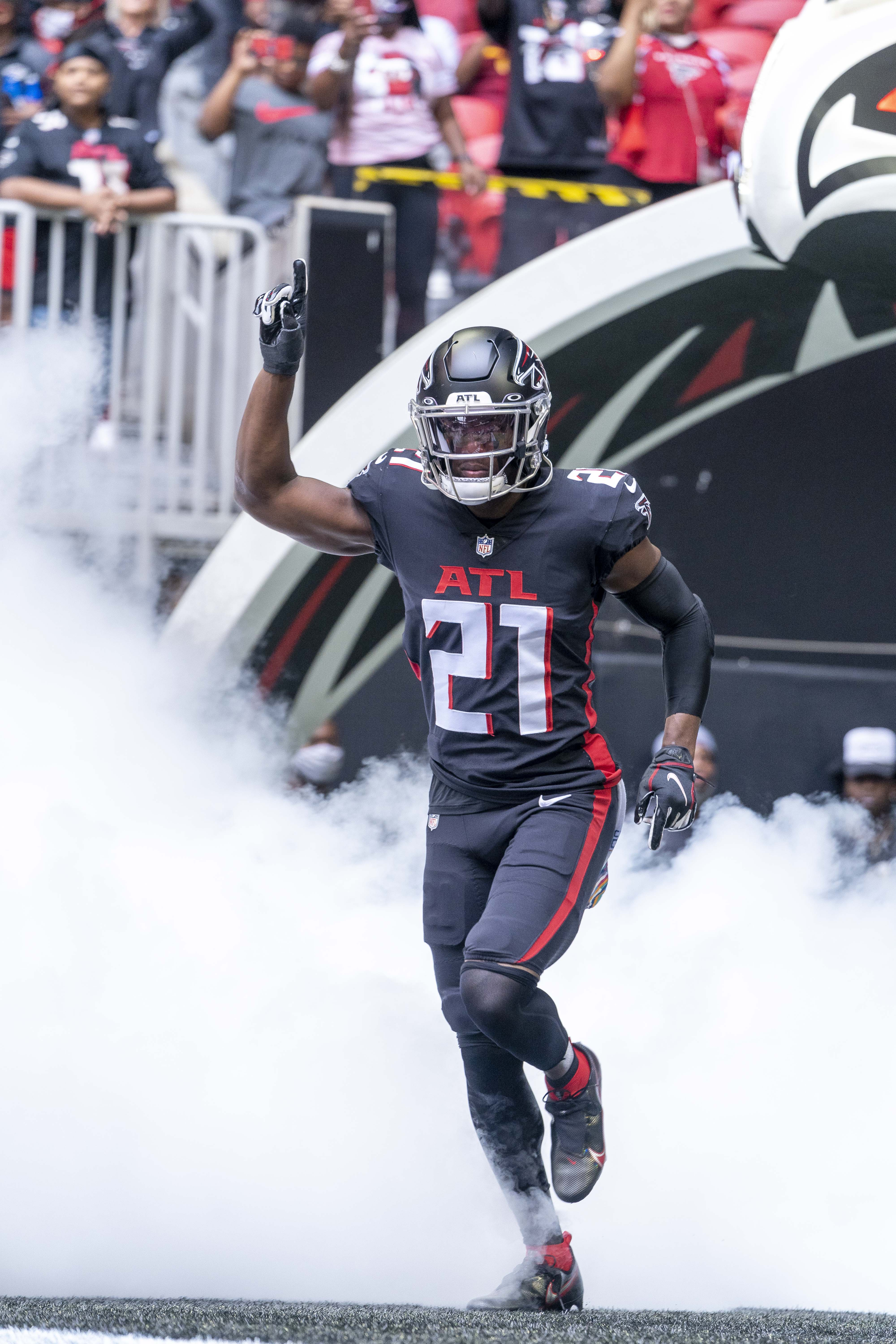
Harmon in 2021

On April 15, 2021, Harmon signed a one-year contract with the Atlanta Falcons.

Harmon made his Falcons debut in the season opener against the Eagles and finished the 32–6 loss with a season-high seven combined tackles (six solo). Three weeks later against the Washington Football Team, Harmon had four combined tackles (three solo) and a pass deflection in the 34–30 loss.

During a narrow Week 9 27–25 road loss to the New Orleans Saints, Harmon recorded two solo tackles and a pass deflection. Three weeks later against the Jaguars, he had two solo tackles, a pass deflection, and his first interception of the season in the 21–14 road victory. During Week 16 against his former team, the Lions, Harmon tied his season high of seven combined tackles (two solo) in the 20–16 victory. In the next game against the Bills, he recorded five combined tackles (three solo), two pass deflections, and an interception during the 29–15 road loss.

Harmon finished the 2021 season with 67 combined tackles (44 solo), two interceptions, and five pass deflections in 17 games and starts.

=== Las Vegas Raiders ===
On March 24, 2022, Harmon signed a one-year contract with the Las Vegas Raiders.

Harmon made his Raiders debut during the season-opener against the Los Angeles Chargers and finished the 24–19 road loss with three combined tackles (two solo). In the next game against the Cardinals, Harmon recorded five combined tackles (three solo) and a pass deflection during the 29–23 overtime loss. The following week against the Titans, he had four combined tackles (two solo), a pass deflection, and his first interception of the season in the narrow 24–22 road loss.

During a Week 4 32–23 victory over the Broncos, Harmon recorded three combined tackles (two solo) and a forced fumble. Three weeks later against the Texans, he had six combined tackles (five solo), a pass deflection, and a 73-yard interception return for a touchdown in the 38–20 victory. In the next game against the Saints, Harmon recorded four combined tackles (two solo) and a pass deflection during the 24–0 shutout road loss.

During Week 12 against the Seahawks, Harmon had seven solo tackles and a pass deflection in the 40–34 overtime road victory. In the next game against the Chargers, he recorded six combined tackles (four solo) and a forced fumble during the 27–20 victory. During a Week 17 37–34 overtime loss to the 49ers, Harmon had a season-high nine combined tackles (eight solo).

Harmon finished the 2022 season with 86 combined tackles (63 solo), two interceptions, five pass deflections, two forced fumbles, and a defensive touchdown in 17 games and starts.

=== Baltimore Ravens ===
On September 12, 2023, Harmon was signed to the Baltimore Ravens' practice squad.

=== Chicago Bears ===
On October 3, 2023, the Chicago Bears signed Harmon to their active roster.

Harmon made his Bears debut in Week 6 against the Vikings, but recorded no statistics during the 19–13 loss. Two weeks later against the Chargers, Harmon had five combined tackles (four solo) in the 30–13 road loss.

Harmon was released on November 8.

=== Cleveland Browns ===
On November 22, 2023, Harmon was signed to the Cleveland Browns' practice squad. He was signed to the active roster on December 13.

Harmon made his Browns debut during Week 15 against his former team, the Bears, and finished the 20–17 victory with two solo tackles and a pass deflection. In the next game against the Texans, Harmon recorded three solo tackles, a pass deflection, and an interception during the 36–22 road victory. During the regular season finale against the Bengals, he had a season-high seven combined tackles (four solo) and his first NFL sack in the 31–14 road victory.

In seven games and one start on the Bears and Browns rosters during the 2023 season, Harmon accumulated 22 combined tackles (18 solo), a sack, an interception, and two pass deflections. The Browns finished second in the AFC North with an 11–6 record and qualified for the playoffs as the #5-seed. During the Wild Card Round against the Texans, Harmon recorded a solo tackle in the 45–14 road loss.

=== Retirement ===
On September 3, 2025, Harmon announced his retirement from professional football after not playing in the 2024 season.

== NFL career statistics ==
Legend
	Won the Super Bowl
**Bold**	Career high

=== Regular season ===
Year	Team	Games		Tackles				Interceptions						Fumbles			
Year	Team	GP	GS	Cmb	Solo	Ast	Sck	Int	Yds	Avg	Lng	TD	PD	FF	FR	Yds	TD
2013	NE	15	3	31	24	7	0.0	2	44	21.0	42	0	4	0	0	0	0
2014	NE	16	0	12	8	4	0.0	1	60	**60.0**	60	0	1	0	**1**	−1	0
2015	NE	16	5	20	14	6	0.0	3	50	16.7	30	0	5	0	0	0	0
2016	NE	16	4	29	24	5	0.0	1	0	0.0	0	0	2	1	**1**	0	0
2017	NE	16	3	23	16	7	0.0	**4**	12	3.0	12	0	**7**	0	0	0	0
2018	NE	16	6	38	32	6	0.0	**4**	0	0.0	0	0	4	0	**1**	**4**	0
2019	NE	16	8	22	19	3	0.0	2	27	13.5	27	0	5	0	0	0	0
2020	DET	16	16	73	54	19	0.0	2	22	11.0	21	0	5	0	0	0	0
2021	ATL	17	17	67	44	**23**	0.0	2	0	0.0	0	0	5	**2**	0	0	0
2022	LV	17	16	**86**	**63**	**23**	0.0	2	**86**	43.0	**73T**	**1**	5	0	0	0	0
2023	CHI	3	1	6	5	1	0.0	0	0	0.0	0	0	0	0	0	0	0
2023	CLE	4	0	16	13	3	**1.0**	1	0	0.0	0	0	2	0	0	0	0
Career		168	79	423	316	107	1.0	24	301	12.5	73T	1	45	1	3	3	0

=== Postseason ===
Year	Team	Games		Tackles				Interceptions						Fumbles			
Year	Team	GP	GS	Cmb	Solo	Ast	Sck	Int	Yds	Avg	Lng	TD	PD	FF	FR	Yds	TD
2013	NE	2	0	0	0	0	0.0	0	0	0.0	0	0	0	0	0	0	0
2014	NE	3	0	1	1	0	0.0	**1**	0	0.0	0	0	**1**	0	0	0	0
2015	NE	2	2	0	0	0	0.0	0	0	0.0	0	0	**1**	0	0	0	0
2016	NE	3	3	**6**	3	**3**	0.0	**1**	**31**	**31.0**	**31**	0	**1**	0	0	0	0
2017	NE	3	1	**6**	**4**	2	0.0	**1**	8	8.0	8	0	**1**	0	0	0	0
2018	NE	3	0	0	0	0	0.0	0	0	0.0	0	0	0	0	0	0	0
2019	NE	1	0	2	2	0	0.0	**1**	0	0.0	0	0	**1**	0	0	0	0
2023	CLE	1	0	1	1	0	0.0	0	0	0.0	0	0	0	0	0	0	0
Career		18	6	16	11	5	0.0	4	39	9.8	31	0	5	0	0	0	0

== Legal troubles ==
On March 24, 2018, it was revealed that Harmon had possession of marijuana while landing in Costa Rica. He was detained and denied entry after marijuana and paraphernalia were found in his luggage. About 58 grams of marijuana were found inside a can of iced tea, three pipes with cannabis oil, a THC candy, and four glass containers with compressed marijuana that weighed 4.3 grams. Harmon was not arrested, but was instead sent back to the United States.
