= Lake Forest School District =

School district in Delaware, United States

Coordinates: 38.989418°N 75.551224°W

Lake Forest School District, in Kent County, Delaware, was created when funding was not sufficient for three proximal districts (Harrington School District, Felton School District, and Frederica School District) so the three were merged to create a new combined district in 1969. Its headquarters are in an unincorporated area of Kent County with a Felton postal address.

It includes Bowers, Felton, Harrington, Viola, most of Riverview, most of Frederica, and some of Woodside East.

== Schools ==
High schools

- Lake Forest High School

Middle schools

- Chipman (W.T.) Middle School

Elementary schools

- Lake Forest Central Elementary School
- Lake Forest East Elementary School
- Lake Forest North Elementary School
- Lake Forest South Elementary School

Early childhood centers

- Delaware Early Childhood Center
