= Viola, Delaware =

- Town
- Location of Viola in Kent County, Delaware.

- Location within the state of Delaware Viola (the United States)
- Coordinates: 39°02′34″N 75°34′19″W
- Country: United States
- State: Delaware
- County: Kent

Area
  - Total: 0.18 sq mi (0.46 km^{2})
  - Land: 0.18 sq mi (0.46 km^{2})
  - Water: 0 sq mi (0.00 km^{2})
- Elevation: 59 ft (18 m)

Population (2020)
  - Total: 140
  - Density: 790.4/sq mi (305.16/km^{2})
- Time zone: UTC−5 (Eastern (EST))
  - Summer (DST): UTC−4 (EDT)
- ZIP code: 19979
- Area code: 302
- FIPS code: 10-74330
- GNIS feature ID: 214796
- Website: viola.delaware.gov

Viola is a town in Kent County, Delaware, United States. It is part of the Dover metropolitan area. The population was 140 in 2020.

== History ==
Viola was built in 1856 after the Delaware Railroad opened a station. The town was laid out on a grant called Golden Thicket, owned by William Shores in 1681.

== Geography ==
Viola is located at 39°02′34″N 75°34′19″W (39.0428907, –75.5718695).

According to the United States Census Bureau, the town has a total area of 0.2 square miles (0.52 km^{2}), all land.

== Demographics ==
Historical population
Census	Pop.	Note	%±
1920	114		—
1930	104		−8.8%
1940	113		8.7%
1950	134		18.6%
1960	159		18.7%
1970	154		−3.1%
1980	167		8.4%
1990	153		−8.4%
2000	156		2.0%
2010	157		0.6%
2020	140		−10.8%
U.S. Decennial Census

As of the census of 2000, there were 156 people, 62 households, and 48 families living in the town. The population density was 878.4 inhabitants per square mile (339.2/km^{2}). The racial makeup of the town was 93.59% White, 4.49% African American and 1.92% Asian. Hispanic or Latino of any race made up 1.92% of the population.

Of the 62 households, 30.6% have at least one person under the age of 18, 62.9% had married couples, 11.3% had a single woman householder, 21.0% had non-families, and 19.4% were owned by a single person, with 8.1% who were 65 years or older. The average household size was 2.52 and the average family size was 2.78.

About 21.2% of the population were under the age of 18, 8.3% from 18 to 24, 26.3% from 25 to 44, 32.7% from 45 to 64, and 11.5% 65 years or older. The median age was 41 years. For every 100 females, there were 110.8 males. For every 100 females age 18 and over, there were 101.6 males.

The median income for a household was $47,813 and the median income for a family was $49,531. Males had a median income of $39,250 versus $24,250 for females. The per capita income for the town was $21,687. About 3.4% of the population live below the poverty line, 16.7% of which are 65 or older.

The only non-residential structures within town limits are a post office, a VCF Ruritan hall, and the Felton-Viola United Methodist Church. The town council has recently implemented strict zoning regulations designed to prevent suburban sprawl. The regulations prohibit businesses with more than two employees, restrict the construction of multi-family dwellings, and forbid any annexation of outlying parcels into the original town proper.

== Education ==
Viola is within the Lake Forest School District. The zoned high school is Lake Forest High School.

== Infrastructure ==
=== Transportation ===
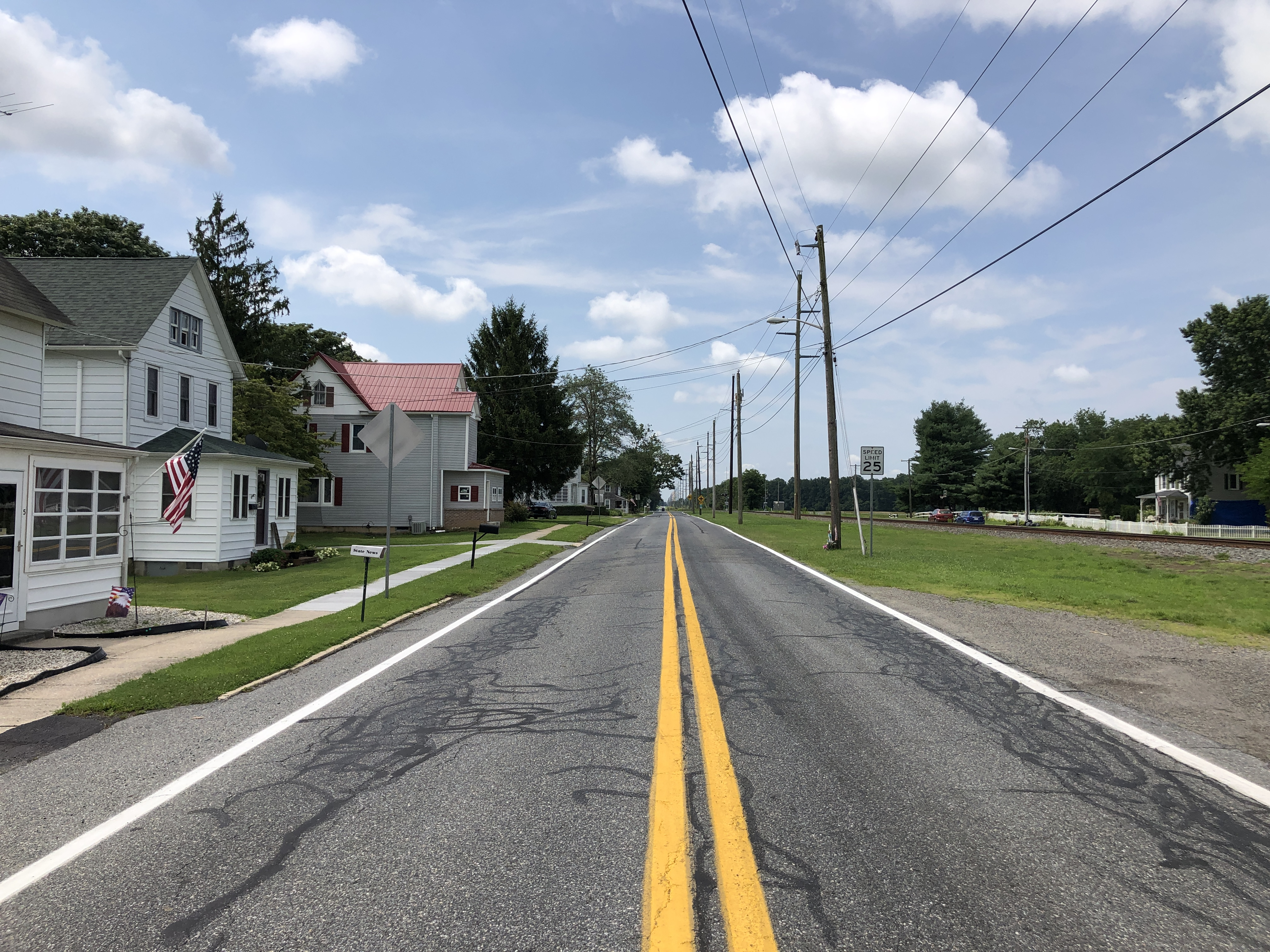
View south along Main Street in Viola

Main Street is the main north–south road through Viola. The road is called Turkey Point Road outside the town limits and leads north toward Woodside and south toward Felton. Evens Road is the main east–west road through Viola and leads east to an intersection with U.S. Route 13 in Canterbury. US 13 heads north toward Dover and south toward Harrington. The Delmarva Central Railroad's Delmarva Subdivision line passes north–south through Viola.

=== Utilities ===
Delmarva Power, a subsidiary of Exelon, provides electricity to Viola. Chesapeake Utilities provides natural gas to the town.
