= Highland Acres, Delaware =

Census-designated place in Delaware, United States

- CDP
- Location in Kent County and the state of Delaware.

- Location within the state of Delaware Highland Acres (the United States)
- Coordinates: 39°07′15″N 75°31′19″W
- Country: United States
- State: Delaware
- County: Kent

Area
  - Total: 1.52 sq mi (3.93 km^{2})
  - Land: 1.49 sq mi (3.87 km^{2})
  - Water: 0.023 sq mi (0.06 km^{2})
- Elevation: 46 ft (14 m)

Population (2020)
  - Total: 3,492
  - Density: 2,339.9/sq mi (903.43/km^{2})
- Time zone: UTC-5 (Eastern (EST))
  - Summer (DST): UTC-4 (EDT)
- Area code: 302
- FIPS code: 10-34810
- GNIS feature ID: 217510

Highland Acres is a census-designated place (CDP) in Kent County, Delaware, United States. It is part of the Dover, Delaware Metropolitan Statistical Area. As of the 2020 census, Highland Acres had a population of 3,492.

== Geography ==
Highland Acres is located at 39°07′15″N 75°31′19″W (39.1209458, -75.5218680).

According to the United States Census Bureau, the CDP has a total area of 1.6 square miles (4.1 km^{2}), of which 1.6 square miles (4.1 km^{2}) is land and 0.04 square miles (0.10 km^{2}) (2.50%) is water.

== Demographics ==
Historical population
Census	Pop.	Note	%±
1970	1,471		—
1980	2,994		103.5%
1990	3,151		5.2%
2000	3,379		7.2%
2010	3,459		2.4%
2020	3,492		1.0%
U.S. Decennial Census

=== 2020 census ===
As of the 2020 census, Highland Acres had a population of 3,492. The median age was 46.0 years. 21.1% of residents were under the age of 18 and 24.3% of residents were 65 years of age or older. For every 100 females there were 91.1 males, and for every 100 females age 18 and over there were 88.8 males age 18 and over.

100.0% of residents lived in urban areas, while 0.0% lived in rural areas.

There were 1,321 households in Highland Acres, of which 29.0% had children under the age of 18 living in them. Of all households, 55.7% were married-couple households, 13.7% were households with a male householder and no spouse or partner present, and 25.1% were households with a female householder and no spouse or partner present. About 22.1% of all households were made up of individuals and 13.7% had someone living alone who was 65 years of age or older.

There were 1,399 housing units, of which 5.6% were vacant. The homeowner vacancy rate was 1.0% and the rental vacancy rate was 4.9%.

Racial composition as of the 2020 census
Race	Number	Percent
White	2,348	67.2%
Black or African American	590	16.9%
American Indian and Alaska Native	18	0.5%
Asian	149	4.3%
Native Hawaiian and Other Pacific Islander	0	0.0%
Some other race	54	1.5%
Two or more races	333	9.5%
Hispanic or Latino (of any race)	197	5.6%

=== 2000 census ===
As of the census of 2000, there were 3,379 people, 1,254 households, and 1,005 families residing in the CDP. The population density was 2,162.9 inhabitants per square mile (835.1/km^{2}). There were 1,293 housing units at an average density of 827.7 per square mile (319.6/km^{2}). The racial makeup of the CDP was 82.84% White, 11.45% African American, 0.38% Native American, 2.57% Asian, 0.44% from other races, and 2.31% from two or more races. Hispanic or Latino of any race were 2.57% of the population.

There were 1,254 households, out of which 32.1% had children under the age of 18 living with them, 68.5% were married couples living together, 8.5% had a female householder with no husband present, and 19.8% were non-families. 16.6% of all households were made up of individuals, and 7.8% had someone living alone who was 65 years of age or older. The average household size was 2.69 and the average family size was 3.01.

In the CDP, the population was spread out, with 24.4% under the age of 18, 7.0% from 18 to 24, 23.8% from 25 to 44, 30.8% from 45 to 64, and 14.0% who were 65 years of age or older. The median age was 42 years. For every 100 females, there were 92.9 males. For every 100 females age 18 and over, there were 90.6 males.

The median income for a household in the CDP was $64,716, and the median income for a family was $71,974. Males had a median income of $42,841 versus $31,028 for females. The per capita income for the CDP was $27,013. About 4.6% of families and 5.6% of the population were below the poverty line, including 11.7% of those under age 18 and 4.6% of those age 65 or over.

== Education ==
Highland Acres is located in the Caesar Rodney School District. Residents north of West Lebanon Road are zoned to W. Reilly Brown Elementary School in Dover, and in turn those zoned to Brown are zoned to Fred Fifer III Middle School in Camden. Residents south of West Lebanon Road are zoned to Allen Frear Elementary School in Rising Sun-Lebanon and they in turn are zoned to Postlethwait Middle School, also in Rising Sun-Lebanon. Caesar Rodney High School in Camden is the comprehensive high school for the entire district.
