= Caesar Rodney High School =

Location
- 239 Old North Road; Camden, Delaware 19934; United States; 39°07′07″N 75°32′28″W

Information
- Type: Public
- Established: 1967 (59 years ago)
- School district: Caesar Rodney School District
- CEEB code: 080005
- Principal: Freeman Williams III
- Grades: 9–12
- Enrollment: 2,242 (2023-2024)
- Colors: Blue and gold
- Athletics conference: Henlopen Conference - Northern Division
- Mascot: Riders
- Nickname: CR
- Newspaper: The Rider Eye
- Website: crhs.crk12.org

Caesar Rodney High School is a public high school located in Camden, Delaware, just south of Dover. The school is in Caesar Rodney School District. Its enrollment is over 2,000. During 1983 to 1984, Caesar Rodney was recognized as a Blue Ribbon School by the US Department of Education.

In addition to Camden, other communities served by the Caesar Rodney district include Highland Acres, Kent Acres, Magnolia, Rising Sun-Lebanon, Rodney Village, Woodside, Wyoming, most of Woodside East, a small portion of Riverview, and the southern part of the state capital, Dover. The Dover Air Force Base also lies within the district.

== Notable alumni ==
- Ashley Coleman (1999) - won Miss Teen Delaware and later won Miss Teen USA 1999; became the first delegate from Delaware to win national title
- Duron Harmon (2009) - 3 time NFL Super Bowl champion safety for the New England Patriots; safety for the Atlanta Falcons football team
- Natalie Morales (1990) NBC News journalist and coanchor of the today show
- Laron Profit - played in the National Basketball Association for the Washington Wizards and Los Angeles Lakers
- Ian Snell - professional baseball pitcher for the Seattle Mariners and Pittsburgh Pirates
- Dave Williams - professional baseball player for the Pittsburgh Pirates, Cincinnati Reds, and New York Mets
