= Woodside East, Delaware =

Census-designated place in Delaware, United States

- CDP
- Location in Kent County and the state of Delaware.

- Location within the state of Delaware Woodside East (the United States)
- Coordinates: 39°04′03″N 75°32′15″W
- Country: United States
- State: Delaware
- County: Kent

Area
  - Total: 1.71 sq mi (4.44 km^{2})
  - Land: 1.71 sq mi (4.44 km^{2})
  - Water: 0 sq mi (0.00 km^{2})
- Elevation: 46 ft (14 m)

Population (2020)
  - Total: 2,570
  - Density: 1,499.9/sq mi (579.11/km^{2})
- Time zone: UTC-5 (Eastern (EST))
  - Summer (DST): UTC-4 (EDT)
- Area code: 302
- FIPS code: 10-80895
- GNIS feature ID: 2390538

Woodside East is a census-designated place (CDP) in Kent County, Delaware, United States. It is part of the Dover, Delaware Metropolitan Statistical Area. As of the 2020 census, Woodside East had a population of 2,570.

== Geography ==
Woodside East is located at 39°04′03″N 75°32′15″W (39.0675435, -75.5376242).

According to the United States Census Bureau, the CDP has a total area of 1.7 square miles (4.4 km^{2}), all land.

== Demographics ==
Historical population
Census	Pop.	Note	%±
1980	1,490		—
1990	1,655		11.1%
2000	2,174		31.4%
2010	2,316		6.5%
2020	2,570		11.0%
U.S. Decennial Census

=== 2020 census ===
As of the 2020 census, Woodside East had a population of 2,570. The median age was 37.6 years. 25.4% of residents were under the age of 18 and 16.4% of residents were 65 years of age or older. For every 100 females there were 89.4 males, and for every 100 females age 18 and over there were 87.2 males age 18 and over.

100.0% of residents lived in urban areas, while 0.0% lived in rural areas.

There were 895 households in Woodside East, of which 33.9% had children under the age of 18 living in them. Of all households, 44.4% were married-couple households, 16.3% were households with a male householder and no spouse or partner present, and 30.9% were households with a female householder and no spouse or partner present. About 25.7% of all households were made up of individuals and 10.2% had someone living alone who was 65 years of age or older.

There were 970 housing units, of which 7.7% were vacant. The homeowner vacancy rate was 1.2% and the rental vacancy rate was 8.1%.

Racial composition as of the 2020 census
Race	Number	Percent
White	1,412	54.9%
Black or African American	736	28.6%
American Indian and Alaska Native	19	0.7%
Asian	30	1.2%
Native Hawaiian and Other Pacific Islander	0	0.0%
Some other race	75	2.9%
Two or more races	298	11.6%
Hispanic or Latino (of any race)	269	10.5%

=== 2000 census ===
As of the 2000 census, there were 2,174 people, 752 households, and 557 families residing in the CDP. The population density was 1,272.7 inhabitants per square mile (491.4/km^{2}). There were 855 housing units at an average density of 500.5 per square mile (193.2/km^{2}). The racial makeup of the CDP was 66.33% White, 28.24% African American, 0.55% Native American, 0.78% Asian, 0.05% Pacific Islander, 0.87% from other races, and 3.17% from two or more races. Hispanic or Latino of any race were 2.39% of the population.

There were 752 households, out of which 46.1% had children under the age of 18 living with them, 46.8% were married couples living together, 20.6% had a female householder with no husband present, and 25.8% were non-families. 18.9% of all households were made up of individuals, and 3.6% had someone living alone who was 65 years of age or older. The average household size was 2.89 and the average family size was 3.28.

In the CDP, the population was spread out, with 34.7% under the age of 18, 9.2% from 18 to 24, 30.8% from 25 to 44, 18.5% from 45 to 64, and 6.7% who were 65 years of age or older. The median age was 30 years. For every 100 females, there were 90.4 males. For every 100 females age 18 and over, there were 86.5 males.

The median income for a household in the CDP was $32,431, and the median income for a family was $32,344. Males had a median income of $29,750 versus $19,865 for females. The per capita income for the CDP was $13,542. About 15.0% of families and 16.1% of the population were below the poverty line, including 19.1% of those under age 18 and 6.8% of those age 65 or over.

== Education ==
Most of Woodside East is located in the Caesar Rodney School District. Portions are zoned to Nellie Stokes Elementary School in Camden, while others are zoned to Star Hill Elementary School, in an unincorporated area, and to Frear Elementary School in Rising Sun-Lebanon. Stokes areas are zoned to Fifer Middle School in Camden while Star Hill and Frear areas are zoned to Postlethwait Middle School, in Rising Sun-Lebanon. Caesar Rodney High School in Camden is the comprehensive high school for the entire district.

Some of Woodside East is in the Lake Forest School District. That area's zoned high school is Lake Forest High School.
