= Kenny Bailey =

American football player (born 1974)

No. 20
- Position: Defensive back

Personal information
- Born: February 3, 1974 (age 52)
- Listed height: 5 ft 10 in (1.78 m)
- Listed weight: 180 lb (82 kg)

Career information
- High school: Lake Forest High School; Felton, Delaware
- College: Delaware
- NFL draft: 1997: undrafted

Career history
- England Monarchs (1998); New Jersey Red Dogs / Gladiators (2000–2001); Tennessee Valley Vipers (2002–2003)
- Stats at ArenaFan.com

Kenny Bailey (born February 3, 1974) is an American former professional football defensive back. He played college football for Delaware before playing for the England Monarchs of NFL Europe in 1998.

Bailey signed with the New Jersey Red Dogs in 2000. He was placed on injured reserve by the New Jersey Red Dogs on April 11, 2000, and activated from the list on May 31, 2000. He was re-signed by the newly-renamed New Jersey Gladiators on March 8, 2001. He was waived by the Gladiators on July 4, 2001.

Bailey signed with the Tennessee Valley Vipers for the 2002 af2 season, and led the team in tackles for the season with 88. After missing the first three games of the 2003 season with a broken foot, the Vipers activated him from injured reserve on May 1, 2003. He was named defensive player of the week for week 10 of the 2003 af2 season with the Tennessee Valley Vipers.
