= Kent Acres, Delaware =

Census-designated place in Delaware, United States

- CDP
- Location in Kent County and the state of Delaware.

- Location within the state of Delaware Kent Acres (the United States)
- Coordinates: 39°07′54″N 75°31′30″W
- Country: United States
- State: Delaware
- County: Kent

Area
  - Total: 0.93 sq mi (2.41 km^{2})
  - Land: 0.85 sq mi (2.20 km^{2})
  - Water: 0.081 sq mi (0.21 km^{2})
- Elevation: 33 ft (10 m)

Population (2020)
  - Total: 2,144
  - Density: 2,525.0/sq mi (974.89/km^{2})
- Time zone: UTC-5 (Eastern (EST))
  - Summer (DST): UTC-4 (EDT)
- Area code: 302
- FIPS code: 10-38710
- GNIS feature ID: 214188

Kent Acres is a census-designated place (CDP) in Kent County, Delaware, United States. It is part of the Dover, Delaware Metropolitan Statistical Area. As of the 2020 census, Kent Acres had a population of 2,144.

== Geography ==
Kent Acres is located at 39°07′54″N 75°31′30″W.

According to the United States Census Bureau, the CDP has a total area of 0.9 square miles (2.3 km^{2}), of which 0.9 square miles (2.3 km^{2}) is land and 0.04 square miles (0.10 km^{2}) (3.26%) is water.

== Demographics ==
Historical population
Census	Pop.	Note	%±
1970	1,573		—
1980	1,590		1.1%
1990	1,807		13.6%
2000	1,637		−9.4%
2010	1,890		15.5%
2020	2,144		13.4%
U.S. Decennial Census

=== 2020 census ===
As of the 2020 census, Kent Acres had a population of 2,144. The median age was 38.7 years. 26.1% of residents were under the age of 18 and 17.1% of residents were 65 years of age or older. For every 100 females there were 83.9 males, and for every 100 females age 18 and over there were 85.7 males age 18 and over.

100.0% of residents lived in urban areas, while 0.0% lived in rural areas.

There were 767 households in Kent Acres, of which 34.3% had children under the age of 18 living in them. Of all households, 49.2% were married-couple households, 14.7% were households with a male householder and no spouse or partner present, and 30.0% were households with a female householder and no spouse or partner present. About 23.3% of all households were made up of individuals and 13.5% had someone living alone who was 65 years of age or older.

There were 822 housing units, of which 6.7% were vacant. The homeowner vacancy rate was 1.4% and the rental vacancy rate was 4.3%.

Racial composition as of the 2020 census
Race	Number	Percent
White	1,150	53.6%
Black or African American	537	25.0%
American Indian and Alaska Native	14	0.7%
Asian	115	5.4%
Native Hawaiian and Other Pacific Islander	0	0.0%
Some other race	94	4.4%
Two or more races	234	10.9%
Hispanic or Latino (of any race)	222	10.4%

=== 2000 census ===
As of the census of 2000, there were 1,637 people, 649 households, and 460 families residing in the CDP. The population density was 1,852.3 inhabitants per square mile (715.2/km^{2}). There were 700 housing units at an average density of 792.1 per square mile (305.8/km^{2}). The racial makeup of the CDP was 73.55% White, 19.85% African American, 0.12% Native American, 1.47% Asian, 2.02% from other races, and 2.99% from two or more races. Hispanic or Latino of any race were 4.58% of the population.

There were 649 households, out of which 33.1% had children under the age of 18 living with them, 49.9% were married couples living together, 16.0% had a female householder with no husband present, and 29.0% were non-families. 23.7% of all households were made up of individuals, and 8.5% had someone living alone who was 65 years of age or older. The average household size was 2.52 and the average family size was 2.96.

In the CDP, the population was spread out, with 26.8% under the age of 18, 6.1% from 18 to 24, 30.6% from 25 to 44, 23.0% from 45 to 64, and 13.5% who were 65 years of age or older. The median age was 37 years. For every 100 females, there were 91.9 males. For every 100 females age 18 and over, there were 87.1 males.

The median income for a household in the CDP was $43,261, and the median income for a family was $47,692. Males had a median income of $33,967 versus $23,393 for females. The per capita income for the CDP was $18,576. About 7.7% of families and 12.3% of the population were below the poverty line, including 19.2% of those under age 18 and 9.9% of those age 65 or over.

== Education ==
Kent Acres is located in the Caesar Rodney School District. Residents are zoned to W. Reilly Brown Elementary School in Dover, and in turn those zoned to Brown are zoned to Fred Fifer III Middle School in Camden. Caesar Rodney High School in Camden is the comprehensive high school for the entire district.
