= Ashley Coleman =

American model (born 1981)

- Born: November 10, 1981 (age 44); Camden, Delaware, U.S.
- Height: 5 ft 8 in (1.73 m)
- Beauty pageant titleholder
- Title: Miss Delaware Teen USA 1999; Miss Teen USA 1999
- Hair color: Brown
- Eye color: Hazel

Ashley Coleman (born 10 November 1981) is an American model and beauty queen who won Miss Teen USA 1999 representing her hometown of Camden and the state of Delaware. Coleman graduated from Caesar Rodney High School in 1999. Before winning her state title, she had modeled for Tommy Hilfiger, Rite Aid, Johnson & Johnson, Seventeen, and Teen People.

Coleman won her first title, Miss Delaware Teen USA, in 1998 and won the Miss Teen USA 1999 title at Shreveport, Louisiana, on August 24, 1999. Coleman was crowned by Vanessa Minnillo of South Carolina and later gave up her title to Jillian Parry from Pennsylvania on August 26, 2000.

After winning the title, she attended the University of Miami and took classes at Delaware State University, completing three years toward a degree in education. Before completing her final year, Coleman moved to Los Angeles in 2003 to enter the entertainment industry.

In Los Angeles, Coleman appeared on The Price Is Right and pursued further modeling work. In 2006, she returned to the pageant scene, placing third runner-up to Tamiko Nash in the Miss California USA 2006 pageant.
