= Woodside, Delaware =

- Town
- Location of Woodside in Kent County, Delaware.

- Location within the state of Delaware Woodside (the United States)
- Coordinates: 39°04′17″N 75°34′06″W
- Country: United States
- State: Delaware
- County: Kent
- Incorporated: April 4, 1911

Area
  - Total: 0.17 sq mi (0.43 km^{2})
  - Land: 0.17 sq mi (0.43 km^{2})
  - Water: 0 sq mi (0.00 km^{2})
- Elevation: 59 ft (18 m)

Population (2020)
  - Total: 190
  - Density: 1,131.8/sq mi (436.98/km^{2})
- Time zone: UTC−5 (Eastern (EST))
  - Summer (DST): UTC−4 (EDT)
- ZIP code: 19980
- Area code: 302
- FIPS code: 10-80830
- GNIS feature ID: 214881
- Website: woodside.delaware.gov

Woodside is a town in Kent County, Delaware, United States. It is part of the Dover metropolitan area. The population was 190 in 2020.

== History ==
Woodside was originally named the "Village of Fredonia" and underwent a name change to Woodside that was passed by the Delaware General Assembly on March 17, 1869. Woodside developed as a shipping center for fruit and grain after the Delaware Railroad was built in 1856. The Woodside Methodist Episcopal Church was listed on the National Register of Historic Places in 1996.

== Geography ==
Woodside is located at 39°04′17″N 75°34′06″W (39.0715017, –75.5682584).

According to the United States Census Bureau, the town has a total area of 0.2 square miles (0.52 km^{2}), all land.

== Demographics ==
Historical population
Census	Pop.	Note	%±
1920	140		—
1930	140		0.0%
1940	189		35.0%
1950	157		−16.9%
1960	189		20.4%
1970	223		18.0%
1980	248		11.2%
1990	140		−43.5%
2000	184		31.4%
2010	181		−1.6%
2020	190		5.0%
U.S. Decennial Census

At the 2000 census there were 184 people, 70 households, and 52 families living in the town. The population density was 1,130.6 inhabitants per square mile (436.5/km^{2}). There were 72 housing units at an average density of 442.4 per square mile (170.8/km^{2}). The racial makeup of the town was 96.20% White, 0.54% African American, 1.09% Asian, 0.54% from other races, and 1.63% from two or more races. Hispanic or Latino of any race were 1.09%.

Of the 70 households 31.4% had children under the age of 18 living with them, 61.4% were married couples living together, 11.4% had a female householder with no husband present, and 25.7% were non-families. 20.0% of households were one person and 12.9% were one person aged 65 or older. The average household size was 2.63 and the average family size was 2.94.

The age distribution was 22.3% under the age of 18, 6.5% from 18 to 24, 33.7% from 25 to 44, 25.0% from 45 to 64, and 12.5% 65 or older. The median age was 39 years. For every 100 females, there were 87.8 males. For every 100 females age 18 and over, there were 81.0 males.

The median household income was $54,250 and the median family income was $53,750. Males had a median income of $35,417 versus $21,875 for females. The per capita income for the town was $23,399. About 3.9% of families and 7.9% of the population were below the poverty line, including none of those under the age of eighteen and 15.0% of those sixty five or over.

== Education ==
Woodside is located in the Caesar Rodney School District. Students are zoned to Nellie Hughes Stokes Elementary School in Camden, and in turn are zoned to Fred Fifer III Middle School in Camden. Caesar Rodney High School in Camden is the comprehensive high school for the entire district.

== Infrastructure ==
=== Transportation ===
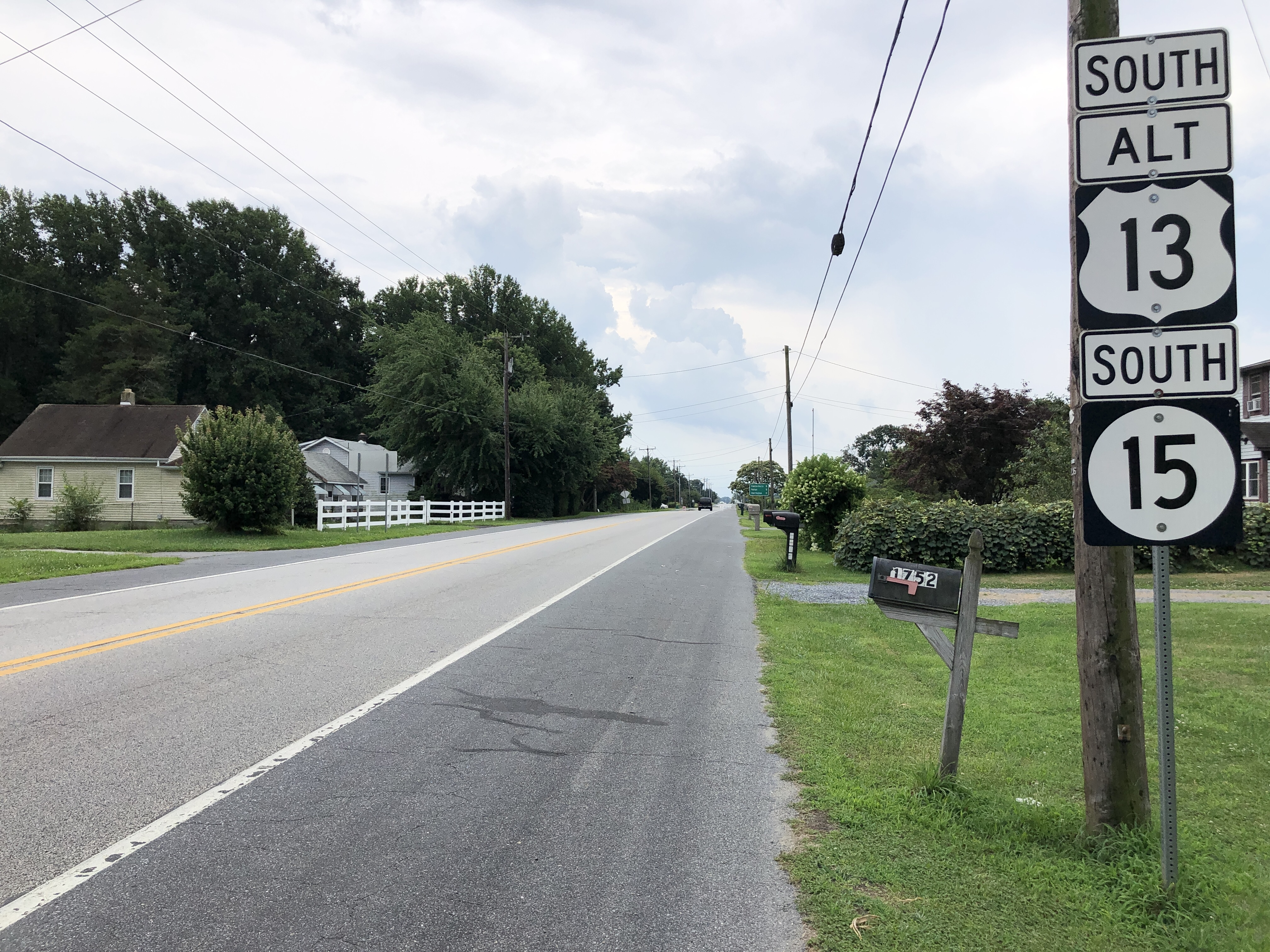
US 13 Alt/DE 15 southbound in Woodside

U.S. Route 13 Alternate passes north–south through Woodside on Upper King Road, heading south to Canterbury and north to Camden. Delaware Route 10 Alternate passes east–west through Woodside on Main Street. Delaware Route 15 passes through Woodside by heading north along US 13 Alternate and west along DE 10 Alternate before heading north along Dundee Road. U.S. Route 13 passes to the east of Woodside along Dupont Highway, heading north toward Dover and south toward Harrington. DART First State provides bus service to the Woodside area along Route 117, which heads north toward Camden to connect to the local bus routes serving the Dover area and south toward Harrington. The Delmarva Central Railroad's Delmarva Secondary line passes north–south through Woodside.

=== Utilities ===
Delmarva Power, a subsidiary of Exelon, provides electricity to Woodside. Chesapeake Utilities provides natural gas to the town.
