= Riverview, Delaware =

Census-designated place in Delaware, United States

- CDP
- Location in Kent County and the state of Delaware.

- Location within the state of Delaware Riverview (the United States)
- Coordinates: 39°01′35″N 75°30′39″W
- Country: United States
- State: Delaware
- County: Kent

Area
  - Total: 3.69 sq mi (9.56 km^{2})
  - Land: 3.61 sq mi (9.35 km^{2})
  - Water: 0.081 sq mi (0.21 km^{2})
- Elevation: 30 ft (9.1 m)

Population (2020)
  - Total: 2,458
  - Density: 680.7/sq mi (262.82/km^{2})
- Time zone: UTC-5 (Eastern (EST))
  - Summer (DST): UTC-4 (EDT)
- Area code: 302
- FIPS code: 10-61480
- GNIS feature ID: 215502

Riverview is a census-designated place (CDP) in Kent County, Delaware, United States. It is part of the Dover, Delaware Metropolitan Statistical Area. As of the 2020 census, Riverview had a population of 2,458.

== Geography ==
Riverview is located at 39°01′35″N 75°30′39″W.

According to the United States Census Bureau, the CDP has a total area of 3.7 square miles (9.6 km^{2}), of which 3.6 square miles (9.3 km^{2}) is land and 0.1 square miles (0.26 km^{2}) (1.91%) is water.

== Demographics ==
Historical population
| Census | Pop. | Note | %± |
|---|---|---|---|
| 1990 | 1,138 | | — |
| 2000 | 1,583 | | 39.1% |
| 2010 | 2,456 | | 55.1% |
| 2020 | 2,458 | | 0.1% |
U.S. Decennial Census

=== 2020 census ===
As of the 2020 census, Riverview had a population of 2,458. The median age was 44.8 years. 22.1% of residents were under the age of 18 and 19.3% of residents were 65 years of age or older. For every 100 females there were 98.2 males, and for every 100 females age 18 and over there were 93.0 males age 18 and over.

76.6% of residents lived in urban areas, while 23.4% lived in rural areas.

There were 906 households in Riverview, of which 31.0% had children under the age of 18 living in them. Of all households, 64.3% were married-couple households, 12.9% were households with a male householder and no spouse or partner present, and 17.9% were households with a female householder and no spouse or partner present. About 19.1% of all households were made up of individuals and 9.0% had someone living alone who was 65 years of age or older.

There were 927 housing units, of which 2.3% were vacant. The homeowner vacancy rate was 0.8% and the rental vacancy rate was 3.7%.

Racial composition as of the 2020 census
| Race | Number | Percent |
|---|---|---|
| White | 1,848 | 75.2% |
| Black or African American | 295 | 12.0% |
| American Indian and Alaska Native | 10 | 0.4% |
| Asian | 51 | 2.1% |
| Native Hawaiian and Other Pacific Islander | 1 | 0.0% |
| Some other race | 44 | 1.8% |
| Two or more races | 209 | 8.5% |
| Hispanic or Latino (of any race) | 167 | 6.8% |

=== 2000 census ===
As of the census of 2000, there were 1,583 people, 560 households, and 455 families residing in the CDP. The population density was 440.1 inhabitants per square mile (169.9/km^{2}). There were 574 housing units at an average density of 159.6 per square mile (61.6/km^{2}). The racial makeup of the CDP was 88.44% White, 7.26% African American, 0.25% Native American, 1.52% Asian, 0.06% Pacific Islander, 1.07% from other races, and 1.39% from two or more races. 2.27% of the population were Hispanic or Latino of any race.

There were 560 households, out of which 41.4% had children under the age of 18 living with them, 69.3% were married couples living together, 8.4% had a female householder with no husband present, and 18.6% are non-families. 13.8% of all households were made up of individuals, and 3.4% had someone living alone who is 65 years of age or older. The average household size was 2.83 and the average family size was 3.09.

In the CDP, the population was spread out, with 28.1% under the age of 18, 7.4% from 18 to 24, 33.0% from 25 to 44, 24.1% from 45 to 64, and 7.3% who are 65 years of age or older. The median age was 36 years. For every 100 females, there were 98.1 males. For every 100 females age 18 and over, there were 94.5 males.

The median income for a household in the CDP was $64,219, and the median income for a family was $66,250. Males had a median income of $39,458 versus $24,605 for females. The per capita income for the CDP was $22,766. 1.9% of the population and 0.9% of families were below the poverty line. Out of the total population, 2.4% of those under the age of 18 and none of those 65 and older were living below the poverty line.

== Education ==
Most of Riverview is in the Lake Forest School District. That area's zoned high school is Lake Forest High School.

Some of Riverview is located in the Caesar Rodney School District. Portions are zoned to Star Hill Elementary School, in an unincorporated area, and in turn are zoned to Postlethwait Middle School, in Rising Sun-Lebanon. Caesar Rodney High School in Camden is the comprehensive high school for the entire district.
