= Lake Forest High School (Delaware) =

High school in Delaware, United States

Coordinates: 38°59′15″N 75°33′06″W

Lake Forest High School is a public high school in an unincorporated area of Kent County with a Felton postal address. It is a part of the Lake Forest School District.

The school services Bowers, Felton, Harrington, Viola, most of Riverview, most of Frederica, and some of Woodside East.

It is a small Division II Henlopen Conference School.

== Notable alumni ==
- Kenny Bailey, football player
