= Rodney Village, Delaware =

Census-designated place in Delaware, United States

- CDP
- Location in Kent County and the state of Delaware.

- Location within the state of Delaware Rodney Village (the United States)
- Coordinates: 39°07′55″N 75°31′57″W
- Country: United States
- State: Delaware
- County: Kent

Area
  - Total: 0.59 sq mi (1.53 km^{2})
  - Land: 0.59 sq mi (1.53 km^{2})
  - Water: 0 sq mi (0.00 km^{2})
- Elevation: 36 ft (11 m)

Population (2020)
  - Total: 1,489
  - Density: 2,522.2/sq mi (973.84/km^{2})
- Time zone: UTC-5 (Eastern (EST))
  - Summer (DST): UTC-4 (EDT)
- Area code: 302
- FIPS code: 10-61720
- GNIS feature ID: 214555

Rodney Village is a census-designated place (CDP) in Kent County, Delaware, United States. It is part of the Dover, Delaware Metropolitan Statistical Area. As of the 2020 census, Rodney Village had a population of 1,489.

== Geography ==
Rodney Village is located at 39°07′55″N 75°31′57″W (39.1320569, -75.5324240).

According to the United States Census Bureau, the CDP has a total area of 0.6 square miles (1.6 km^{2}), all land.

== Demographics ==
Historical population
Census	Pop.	Note	%±
1970	2,127		—
1980	1,753		−17.6%
1990	1,745		−0.5%
2000	1,602		−8.2%
2010	1,487		−7.2%
2020	1,489		0.1%
U.S. Decennial Census

=== 2020 census ===
As of the 2020 census, Rodney Village had a population of 1,489. The median age was 34.7 years. 26.1% of residents were under the age of 18 and 15.8% of residents were 65 years of age or older. For every 100 females there were 88.0 males, and for every 100 females age 18 and over there were 82.4 males age 18 and over.

100.0% of residents lived in urban areas, while 0.0% lived in rural areas.

There were 550 households in Rodney Village, of which 33.6% had children under the age of 18 living in them. Of all households, 31.1% were married-couple households, 22.4% were households with a male householder and no spouse or partner present, and 39.1% were households with a female householder and no spouse or partner present. About 30.4% of all households were made up of individuals and 10.2% had someone living alone who was 65 years of age or older.

There were 612 housing units, of which 10.1% were vacant. The homeowner vacancy rate was 1.0% and the rental vacancy rate was 14.3%.

Racial composition as of the 2020 census
Race	Number	Percent
White	442	29.7%
Black or African American	767	51.5%
American Indian and Alaska Native	8	0.5%
Asian	57	3.8%
Native Hawaiian and Other Pacific Islander	0	0.0%
Some other race	65	4.4%
Two or more races	150	10.1%
Hispanic or Latino (of any race)	167	11.2%

=== 2010 census ===
In 2010, Rodney Village had a population of 1,487 people. The racial makeup of the CDP was 38.9% White, 49.3% African American, 0.6% Native American, 4.2% Asian, 0.0% Pacific Islander, 2.4% from other races, and 4.6% from two or more races. 7.0% of the population were Hispanic or Latino of any race.

=== 2000 census ===
As of the census of 2000, there were 1,602 people, 596 households, and 413 families residing in the CDP. The population density was 2,652.6 inhabitants per square mile (1,024.2/km^{2}). There were 630 housing units at an average density of 1,043.2 per square mile (402.8/km^{2}). The racial makeup of the CDP was 49.13% White, 38.83% African American, 0.75% Native American, 4.00% Asian, 1.62% from other races, and 5.68% from two or more races. Hispanic or Latino of any race were 6.24% of the population.

There were 596 households, out of which 32.0% had children under the age of 18 living with them, 43.1% were married couples living together, 19.6% had a female householder with no husband present, and 30.7% were non-families. 21.6% of all households were made up of individuals, and 7.4% had someone living alone who was 65 years of age or older. The average household size was 2.62 and the average family size was 3.06.

In the CDP, the population was spread out, with 26.1% under the age of 18, 13.7% from 18 to 24, 27.7% from 25 to 44, 21.3% from 45 to 64, and 11.2% who were 65 years of age or older. The median age was 34 years. For every 100 females, there were 100.0 males. For every 100 females age 18 and over, there were 97.3 males.

The median income for a household in the CDP was $40,875, and the median income for a family was $41,767. Males had a median income of $28,676 versus $23,750 for females. The per capita income for the CDP was $15,946. About 5.1% of families and 8.1% of the population were below the poverty line, including 11.3% of those under age 18 and 7.8% of those age 65 or over.

== Education ==
Rodney Village is located in the Caesar Rodney School District. Residents are zoned to W. Reily Brown Elementary School in Dover, and in turn those zoned to Brown are zoned to Fred Fifer III Middle School in Camden. Caesar Rodney High School in Camden is the comprehensive high school for the entire district.
