= Rising Sun-Lebanon, Delaware =

Census-designated place in Delaware, United States

- CDP
- Location in Kent County and the state of Delaware.

- Location within the state of Delaware Rising Sun-Lebanon (the United States)
- Coordinates: 39°05′59″N 75°30′18″W
- Country: United States
- State: Delaware
- County: Kent

Area
  - Total: 3.61 sq mi (9.35 km^{2})
  - Land: 3.58 sq mi (9.26 km^{2})
  - Water: 0.035 sq mi (0.09 km^{2})
- Elevation: 26 ft (7.9 m)

Population (2020)
  - Total: 4,104
  - Density: 1,148.2/sq mi (443.31/km^{2})
- Time zone: UTC-5 (Eastern (EST))
  - Summer (DST): UTC-4 (EDT)
- Area code: 302
- FIPS code: 10-61265
- GNIS feature ID: 2389754

Rising Sun-Lebanon is a census-designated place (CDP) in Kent County, Delaware, United States. It is part of the Dover, Delaware Metropolitan Statistical Area. As of the 2020 census, Rising Sun-Lebanon had a population of 4,104.

== Geography ==
Rising Sun-Lebanon is located at 39°05′59″N 75°30′18″W (39.0998156, -75.5050260).

According to the United States Census Bureau, the CDP has a total area of 3.6 square miles (9.2 km^{2}), of which 3.4 square miles (8.8 km^{2}) is land and 0.2 square miles (0.4 km^{2}) (4.76%) is water.

== Demographics ==
Historical population
Census	Pop.	Note	%±
1980	2,176		—
1990	2,177		0.0%
2000	2,458		12.9%
2010	3,391		38.0%
2020	4,104		21.0%
U.S. Decennial Census

=== 2020 census ===
As of the 2020 census, Rising Sun-Lebanon had a population of 4,104. The median age was 34.7 years. 27.0% of residents were under the age of 18 and 12.4% of residents were 65 years of age or older. For every 100 females, there were 95.5 males, and for every 100 females age 18 and over, there were 93.1 males age 18 and over.

100.0% of residents lived in urban areas, while 0.0% lived in rural areas.

There were 1,400 households in Rising Sun-Lebanon, of which 41.0% had children under the age of 18 living in them. Of all households, 52.1% were married-couple households, 14.8% were households with a male householder and no spouse or partner present, and 24.7% were households with a female householder and no spouse or partner present. About 18.5% of all households were made up of individuals and 6.7% had someone living alone who was 65 years of age or older.

There were 1,505 housing units, of which 7.0% were vacant. The homeowner vacancy rate was 1.7% and the rental vacancy rate was 7.2%.

Racial composition as of the 2020 census
Race	Number	Percent
White	2,290	55.8%
Black or African American	985	24.0%
American Indian and Alaska Native	36	0.9%
Asian	233	5.7%
Native Hawaiian and Other Pacific Islander	7	0.2%
Some other race	128	3.1%
Two or more races	425	10.4%
Hispanic or Latino (of any race)	369	9.0%

=== 2000 census ===
As of the census of 2000, there were 2,458 people, 829 households, and 669 families residing in the CDP. The population density was 724.3 inhabitants per square mile (279.7/km^{2}). There were 940 housing units at an average density of 277.0 per square mile (107.0/km^{2}). The racial makeup of the CDP was 75.71% White, 15.58% African American, 0.49% Native American, 2.36% Asian, 2.56% from other races, and 3.30% from two or more races. Hispanic or Latino of any race were 5.94% of the population.

There were 829 households, out of which 49.1% had children under the age of 18 living with them, 64.4% were married couples living together, 12.9% had a female householder with no husband present, and 19.2% were non-families. 14.5% of all households were made up of individuals, and 4.6% had someone living alone who was 65 years of age or older. The average household size was 2.97 and the average family size was 3.29.

In the CDP, the population was spread out, with 35.0% under the age of 18, 11.4% from 18 to 24, 35.3% from 25 to 44, 12.7% from 45 to 64, and 5.5% who were 65 years of age or older. The median age was 27 years. For every 100 females, there were 97.0 males. For every 100 females age 18 and over, there were 95.7 males.

The median income for a household in the CDP was $37,315, and the median income for a family was $40,658. Males had a median income of $27,031 versus $21,302 for females. The per capita income for the CDP was $13,868. About 4.1% of families and 6.6% of the population were below the poverty line, including 7.4% of those under age 18 and 2.9% of those age 65 or over.

== Education ==
Rising Sun-Lebanon is located in the Caesar Rodney School District. Portions are zoned to Allen Frear Elementary School in Rising Sun-Lebanon while others are zoned to Star Hill Elementary School, in an unincorporated area. Both areas in turn are zoned to Postlethwait Middle School, also in Rising Sun-Lebanon. Caesar Rodney High School in Camden is the comprehensive high school for the entire district.
