= Camden, Delaware =

- Town
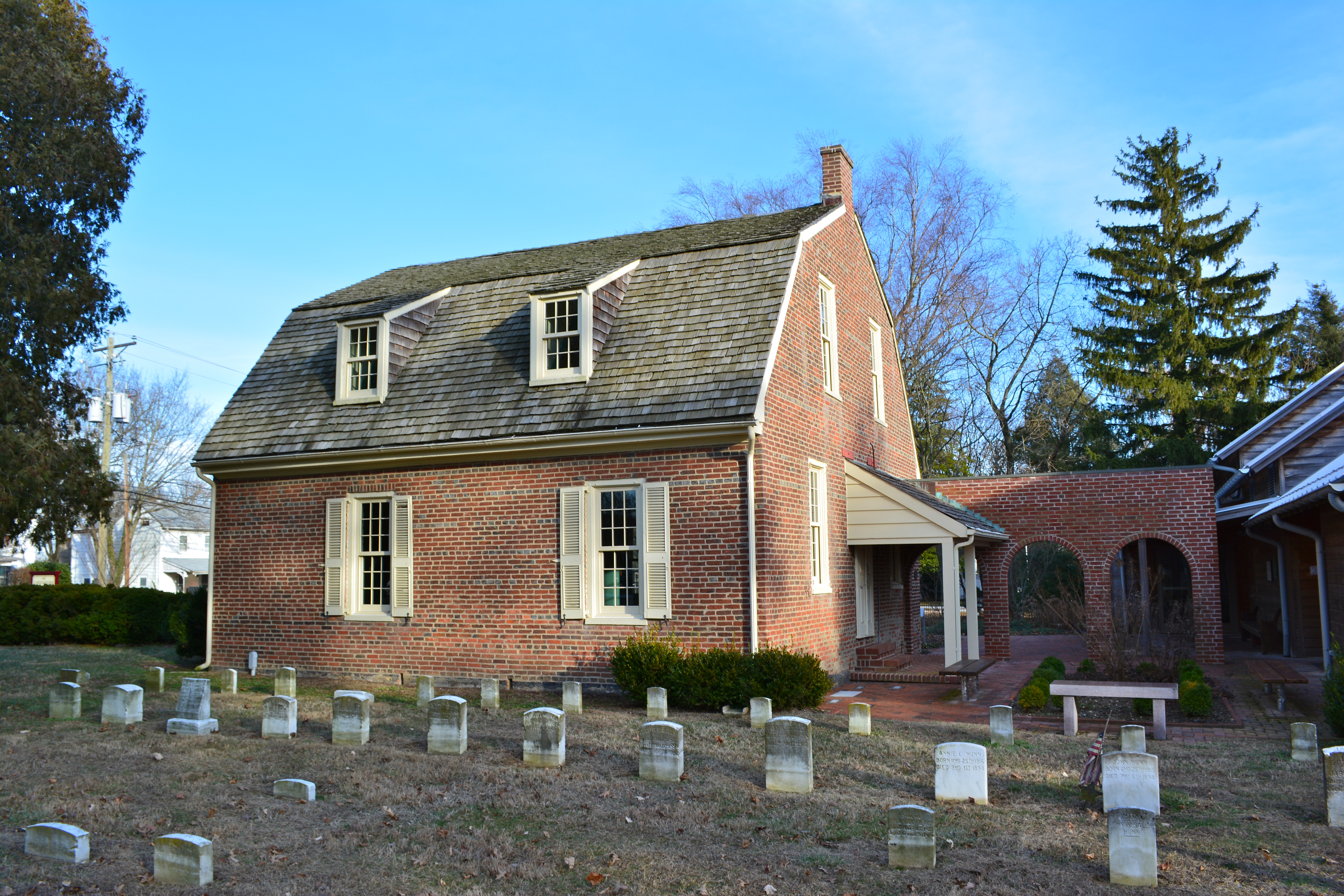
- 1805 Camden Friends Meetinghouse

- Seal

- Location of Camden in Kent County, Delaware.

- Location within the state of Delaware Camden (the United States)
- Coordinates: 39°06′48″N 75°32′31″W
- Country: United States
- State: Delaware
- County: Kent

Government
  - Type: Mayor-council
  - Mayor: Larry Dougherty
  - Vice-Mayor: Vicki Rhodes

Area
  - Total: 3.75 sq mi (9.70 km^{2})
  - Land: 3.75 sq mi (9.70 km^{2})
  - Water: 0 sq mi (0.00 km^{2})
- Elevation: 39 ft (12 m)

Population (2020)
  - Total: 3,715
  - Density: 991.8/sq mi (382.92/km^{2})
- Time zone: UTC−5 (Eastern (EST))
  - Summer (DST): UTC−4 (EDT)
- ZIP code: 19934
- Area code: 302
- FIPS code: 10-10760
- GNIS feature ID: 213746
- Website: camden.delaware.gov

Camden is a town in Kent County, Delaware, United States. It is part of the Dover metropolitan area. The population was 3,715 in 2020.

== History ==
Camden was established in 1783 as a community originally known as Mifflin's Crossroads. The community of Mifflin's Crossroads was a Quaker settlement laid out by Daniel Mifflin on the Piccadilly tract. The town originally gained some commercial trade through wharves in nearby Forest Landing and Lebanon on the St. Jones River. From these wharves, regular boat service connected the area to Philadelphia and New York City, with local merchants shipping cordwood, staves, grain, and Spanish-oak bark. The Delaware Railroad was built through nearby Wyoming in the 1850s and expanded the market for local farm products, bringing increased prosperity to Camden. The town has numerous historic properties and part of it is designated as the Camden Historic District. In addition, Brecknock, Camden Friends Meetinghouse, Star Hill AME Church, and Zion African Methodist Episcopal Church are all listed individually on the National Register of Historic Places.

On February 22, 1975, a vote was held to merge with the bordering town of Wyoming; the residents of Camden voted 117 to 49 in favor of merging the towns, but the measure failed when Wyoming residents voted against the measure by a similar proportion in reverse: 113 against to 78 in favor. The Wyoming town council had previously opposed a merger attempt in 1967.

== Geography ==
Camden is located at 39°06′48″N 75°32′31″W (39.1134458, –75.5418687).

According to the United States Census Bureau, the town has a total area of 1.9 square miles (4.9 km^{2}), all land.

Because of the small size of this town, and its even smaller neighbor of Wyoming, the U.S. Postal Service has jointly assigned the towns a single ZIP code, 19934, which is designated as the Camden-Wyoming ZIP code.

=== Climate ===
The climate in this area is characterized by hot, humid summers and generally mild to cool winters. According to the Köppen Climate Classification system, Camden has a humid subtropical climate, abbreviated "Cfa" on climate maps.

Climate data for Camden, Delaware
Month	Jan	Feb	Mar	Apr	May	Jun	Jul	Aug	Sep	Oct	Nov	Dec	Year
Record high °F (°C)	77 (25)	80 (27)	87 (31)	97 (36)	98 (37)	100 (38)	104 (40)	102 (39)	98 (37)	95 (35)	85 (29)	75 (24)	104 (40)
Mean daily maximum °F (°C)	43 (6)	47 (8)	55 (13)	66 (19)	75 (24)	83 (28)	87 (31)	85 (29)	79 (26)	69 (21)	59 (15)	47 (8)	66 (19)
Mean daily minimum °F (°C)	27 (−3)	29 (−2)	36 (2)	44 (7)	54 (12)	63 (17)	69 (21)	67 (19)	60 (16)	49 (9)	40 (4)	31 (−1)	47 (8)
Record low °F (°C)	−7 (−22)	−11 (−24)	7 (−14)	14 (−10)	28 (−2)	41 (5)	45 (7)	35 (2)	30 (−1)	25 (−4)	11 (−12)	−3 (−19)	−11 (−24)
Average precipitation inches (mm)	3.41 (87)	3.18 (81)	4.31 (109)	3.88 (99)	4.25 (108)	4.00 (102)	4.09 (104)	4.36 (111)	4.13 (105)	3.42 (87)	3.48 (88)	3.65 (93)	46.16 (1,174)
Source: The Weather Channel

== Demographics ==
Historical population
Census	Pop.	Note	%±
1870	657		—
1880	702		6.8%
1890	553		−21.2%
1900	586		6.0%
1910	553		−5.6%
1920	531		−4.0%
1930	464		−12.6%
1940	682		47.0%
1950	606		−11.1%
1960	1,125		85.6%
1970	1,241		10.3%
1980	1,757		41.6%
1990	1,899		8.1%
2000	2,100		10.6%
2010	3,464		65.0%
2020	3,715		7.2%
U.S. Decennial Census

=== 2020 census ===
As of the 2020 census, Camden had a population of 3,715. The median age was 41.7 years. 21.6% of residents were under the age of 18 and 23.0% of residents were 65 years of age or older. For every 100 females there were 92.7 males, and for every 100 females age 18 and over there were 85.3 males age 18 and over.

98.8% of residents lived in urban areas, while 1.2% lived in rural areas.

There were 1,495 households in Camden, of which 31.7% had children under the age of 18 living in them. Of all households, 46.7% were married-couple households, 16.2% were households with a male householder and no spouse or partner present, and 31.0% were households with a female householder and no spouse or partner present. About 26.8% of all households were made up of individuals and 15.1% had someone living alone who was 65 years of age or older.

There were 1,579 housing units, of which 5.3% were vacant. The homeowner vacancy rate was 1.9% and the rental vacancy rate was 5.2%.

Racial composition as of the 2020 census
Race	Number	Percent
White	2,163	58.2%
Black or African American	919	24.7%
American Indian and Alaska Native	22	0.6%
Asian	158	4.3%
Native Hawaiian and Other Pacific Islander	4	0.1%
Some other race	101	2.7%
Two or more races	348	9.4%
Hispanic or Latino (of any race)	265	7.1%

=== 2000 census ===
As of the census of 2000, there were 2,100 people, 835 households, and 573 families residing in the town. The population density was 1,130.9 inhabitants per square mile (436.6/km^{2}). There were 886 housing units at an average density of 477.1 units per square mile (184.2 units/km^{2}). The racial makeup of the town was 76.67% White, 18.00% African American, 0.81% Native American, 1.38% Asian, 0.14% Pacific Islander, 0.90% from other races, and 2.10% from two or more races. Hispanic or Latino of any race were 2.90% of the population.

There were 835 households, out of which 35.1% had children under the age of 18 living with them, 50.2% were married couples living together, 15.3% had a female householder with no husband present, and 31.3% were non-families. 24.1% of all households were made up of individuals, and 8.4% had someone living alone who was 65 years of age or older. The average household size was 2.51 and the average family size was 3.02.

In the town, the population was spread out, with 27.0% under the age of 18, 9.1% from 18 to 24, 30.7% from 25 to 44, 21.6% from 45 to 64, and 11.6% who were 65 years of age or older. The median age was 36 years. For every 100 females, there were 90.9 males. For every 100 females age 18 and over, there were 83.3 males.

The median income for a household in the town was $47,097, and the median income for a family was $50,347. Males had a median income of $32,154 versus $25,261 for females. The per capita income for the town was $21,113. About 1.8% of families and 4.9% of the population were below the poverty line, including 4.7% of those under age 18 and 2.4% of those age 65 or over.

== Infrastructure ==
=== Transportation ===
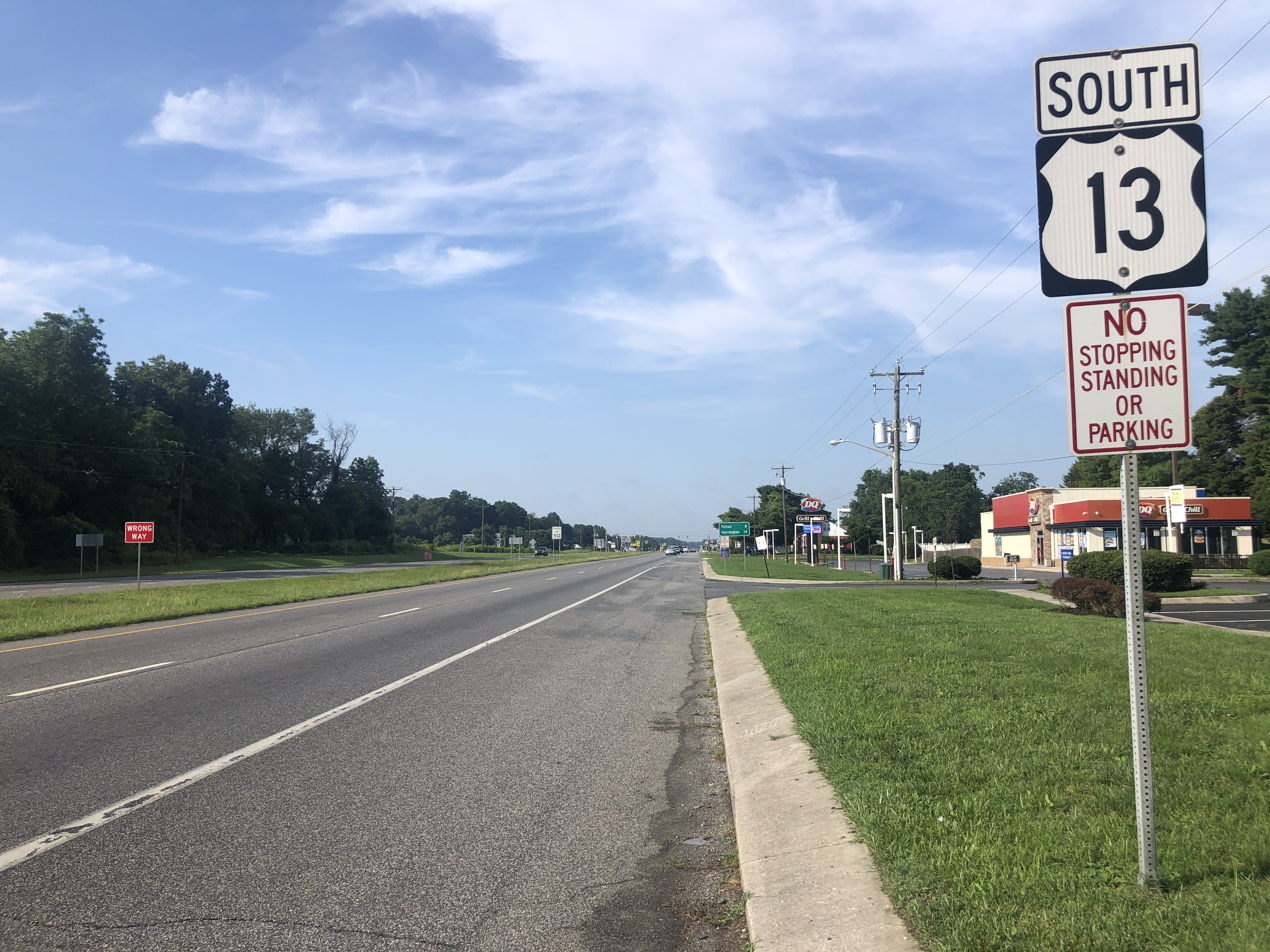
US 13 southbound in Camden

U.S. Route 13 runs north–south through the eastern part of Camden, heading north toward Dover and south toward Salisbury. U.S. Route 13 Alternate passes north–south through the center of Camden on Main Street. Delaware Route 10 runs east–west through Camden on Camden Wyoming Avenue, heading west through rural western Kent County to the Maryland border and east toward Dover Air Force Base. DART First State provides bus service to Camden along Route 104, which runs from the Walmart in Camden north to the Dover Transit Center in Dover and connects to other local bus routes serving the Dover area; Route 117, which runs from the Walmart in Camden south to Harrington; and Route 303, which heads north to Dover and south to Georgetown.

=== Utilities ===
Delmarva Power, a subsidiary of Exelon, provides electricity to Camden. Chesapeake Utilities provides natural gas to the town. The Camden-Wyoming Sewer & Water Authority provides sewer and water service to Camden and the neighboring town of Wyoming. Trash and recycling collection in Camden is provided under contract by Republic Services.

== Education ==
Camden is located in the Caesar Rodney School District. It is divided between the boundaries of Nellie Hughes Stokes Elementary School in Camden and W. B. Simpson Elementary School in Wyoming. Students zoned to Stokes and Simpson are zoned to Fred Fifer III Middle School in Camden. Areas east of US 13 zoned to W. Reily Brown Elementary in Dover are on land zoned as commercial. Caesar Rodney High School in Camden is the comprehensive high school for the entire district.

== Government ==
- Mayor: Larry Dougherty
- Vice-Mayor: Vicki Rhodes
- Councilman: Dan Woodall
- Councilwoman: Darlene Sturgeon
- Councilman: Dan Ridgley
- Chief of Police: Marcus Whitney
- Town Manager: Harold Scott

== Notable people ==
- Ashley Coleman, Miss Delaware Teen USA 1999, Miss Teen USA 1999 (born and grew up in Camden)
- Eric Buckson, born in Camden and a current Kent County Levy Court Commissioner
- Henry Hayes Lockwood, born in Camden Civil War general
- Charles L. Terry Jr., born in Camden, 65th Governor of Delaware
- R. Thomas Wagner, Jr., State Auditor of Delaware and former Mayor of Camden
