= Special routes of U.S. Route 13 =

Special routes of U.S. Route 13

Highway system
- United States Numbered Highway System; List; Special; Divided

U.S. Route 13 (US 13) runs along the Atlantic coastline for over 500 miles (800 km), passing through five states. Along its route, it possessed numerous special routes, which are all loops off the mainline US 13. At present, there are at least 15 special routes in existence: two in North Carolina, five in Virginia, two in Maryland, four in Delaware, and two in Pennsylvania. 13 others have existed in the past but have been deleted.

== North Carolina ==
=== Bethel business loop ===
U.S. Highway 13 Business
- Location: Bethel, North Carolina
- Length: 2.9 mi (4.7 km)
- Existed: 2004–present

U.S. Highway 13 Business (US 13 Bus.) is a business route of US 13, passing through Bethel in the state of North Carolina. It is entirely overlapped with North Carolina Highway 11 Bus. (NC 11 Bus.). The route branches from US 13 just south of the town and follows South Main Street through the town, intersecting US 64 Alternate (US 64 Alt.) within. It rejoins US 13 just south of its interchange with US 64.

Major intersections

| County | Location | mi | km | Destinations | Notes |
|---|---|---|---|---|---|
| Pitt | | 0.0 | 0.0 | US 13 / NC 11 / NC 11 Bus. begins – Greenville, Williamston | South end of NC 11 Business overlap |
| Pitt | Bethel | 1.2 | 1.9 | US 64 Alt. – Tarboro, Parmele, Williamston | |
| Edgecombe | | 2.9 | 4.7 | US 13 / NC 11 / NC 11 Bus. ends – Greenville, Williamston | North end of NC 11 Business overlap |
1.000 mi = 1.609 km; 1.000 km = 0.621 mi: Concurrency terminus

=== Windsor alternate route ===
U.S. Highway 13A
- Location: Windsor, North Carolina
- Length: 2.2 mi (3.5 km)
- Existed: 1957–1960

U.S. Highway 13A (US 13A) was an alternate route of US 13 serving Windsor, North Carolina. Established by 1957 when mainline US 13 was bypassed west of Windsor, the alternate route followed the original alignment through downtown Windsor. In 1960, it was redesignated as a business route.

=== Windsor business loop ===
U.S. Highway 13 Business
- Location: Windsor, North Carolina
- Length: 2.2 mi (3.5 km)
- Existed: 1960–present

U.S. Highway 13 Business (US 13 Bus.) is a business route of US 13 serving Windsor, North Carolina. It begins by following US 17 off the concurrency with US 13 south of the town but leaves US 17 at the very next intersection, following South Granville Street. It then turns onto West Granville Street, where it follows NC 308, and then north on North King Street, leaving behind NC 308. US 13 Bus. continues north along King Street until it rejoins US 13 north of the town.

Major intersections

The entire route is in Windsor, Bertie County.

| mi | km | Destinations | Notes |
|---|---|---|---|
| 0.0 | 0.0 | US 13 / US 17 – Williamston, Ahoskie, Edenton | South end of US 17 Business overlap |
| 0.1 | 0.16 | US 17 Bus. north | North end of US 17 Business overlap |
| 0.9 | 1.4 | NC 308 west (Sterlingworth Street) – Lewiston Woodville | West end of NC 308 overlap |
| 1.2 | 1.9 | NC 308 east (King Street) | East end of NC 308 overlap |
| 2.2 | 3.5 | US 13 / US 17 – Williamston, Ahoskie, Edenton | |
1.000 mi = 1.609 km; 1.000 km = 0.621 mi

== Virginia ==
=== Suffolk business loop ===
U.S. Route 13 Business
- Location: Suffolk, Virginia
- Length: 6.43 mi (10.35 km)

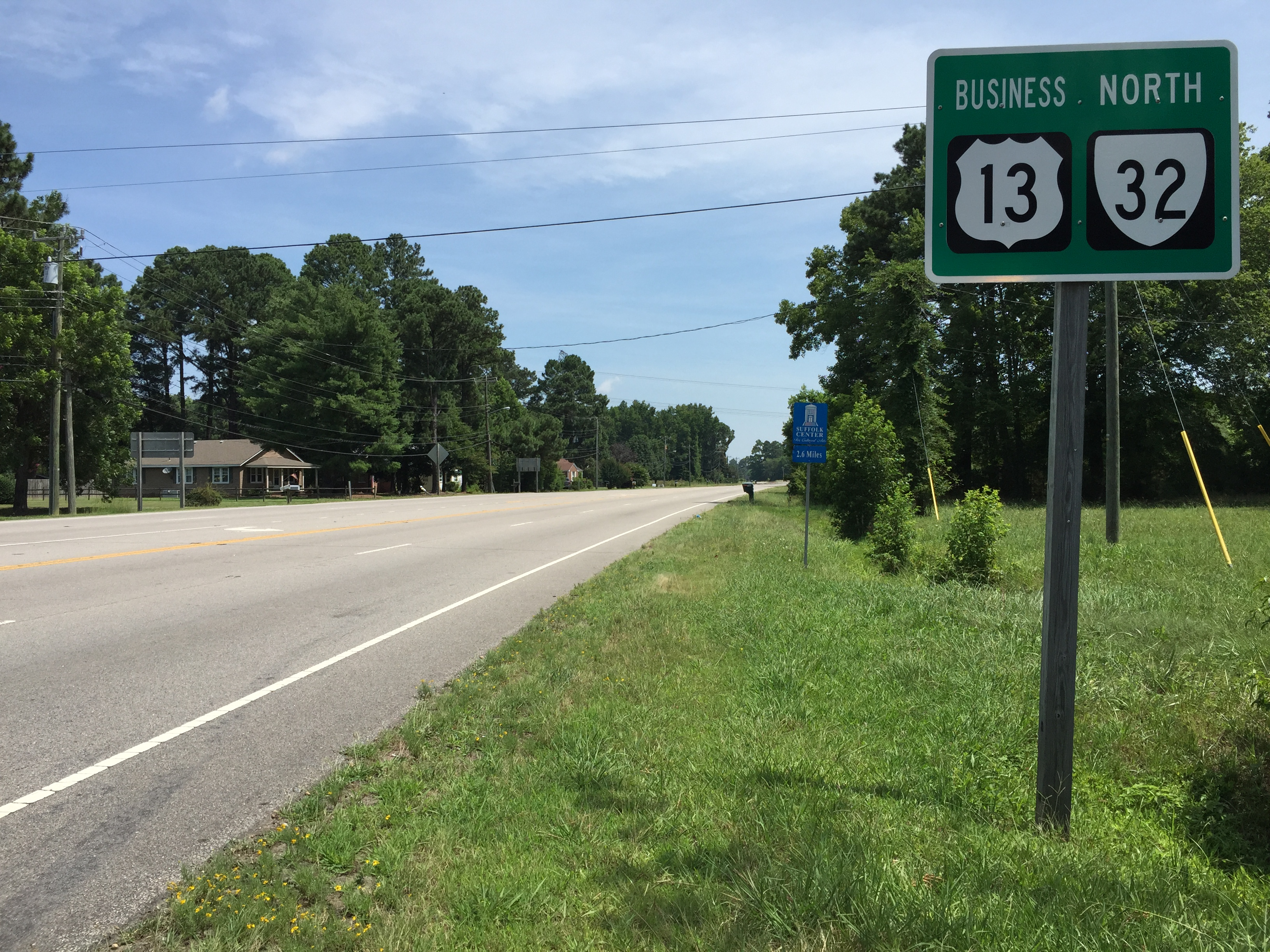
View north along US 13 Bus. and SR 32 at US 13 in Suffolk

U.S. Route 13 Business (US 13 Bus.) is a business route of US 13 serving the city of Suffolk in the state of Virginia. It consists of the original routing of the highway before mainline US 13 was rerouted onto a freeway bypass to the west and north of the city. It begins near Suffolk Executive Airport, where US 13 leaves the roadway at a trumpet interchange, traveling west, while US 13 Bus. continues north on Carolina Road concurrent with State Route 32 (SR 32). As it travels deeper into the city, it intersects Washington Street, which carries SR 337, and becomes concurrent with SR 10. The three routes follow Main Street north until it meets US 58 Bus. and US 460 Bus. Here, US 13 Bus. joins the two business routes and heads east on Constance Road. The name changes to Portsmouth Boulevard and US 13 Bus./US 58 Bus./US 460 Bus. cross SR 337. The three-route overlap of business routes rejoin their mainline route, US 13/US 58/US 460, at a directional interchange (with no access to the southbound/westbound carriageway from the northbound business route) and resumes toward Norfolk.

Major intersections

The entire route is in Suffolk.

| mi | km | Destinations | Notes |
|---|---|---|---|
| 0.00 | 0.00 | US 13 / SR 32 south (Carolina Road/Suffolk Bypass) to US 58 – Norfolk, Emporia | Interchange, south end of SR 32 overlap |
| 2.05 | 3.30 | SR 337 (Washington Street) SR 10 begins | South end of SR 10 overlap |
| 2.73 | 4.39 | US 58 Bus. west (Constance Road) US 460 Bus. / SR 10 west / SR 32 north (Main Street) | North end of SR 10/SR 32 overlap, south end of US 58 Bus./US 460 Bus. overlap |
| 5.21 | 8.38 | SR 337 (Nansemond Parkway/East Washington Street) – Driver | |
| 6.43 | 10.35 | US 13 north / US 58 / US 460 east (Portsmouth Boulevard) | Interchange, north end of US 58 Bus./US 460 Bus. overlap |
1.000 mi = 1.609 km; 1.000 km = 0.621 mi: Concurrency terminus

=== Norfolk spur route ===
U.S. Route 13 Spur
- Location: Norfolk, Virginia

=== Cheriton business loop ===
U.S. Route 13 Business
- Location: Cheriton, Virginia
- Length: 1.59 mi (2.56 km)

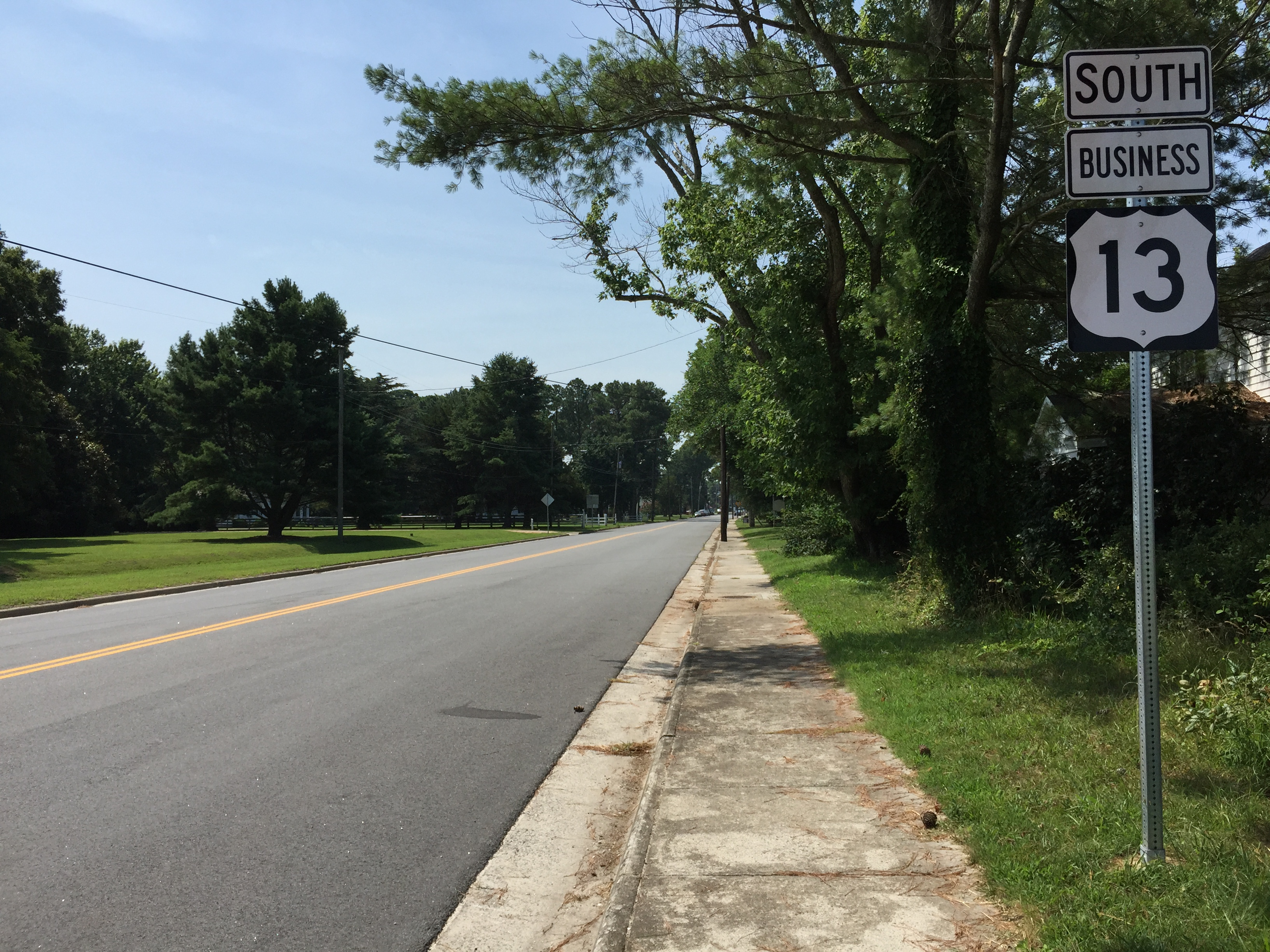
View south along US 13 Bus. at US 13 in Cheriton

U.S. Route 13 Business (US 13 Bus.) is a business route of US 13 serving Cheriton in the state of Virginia. The route begins at an intersection with mainline US 13 and SR 184, where SR 184 goes westward and US 13 Bus. leaves to the east of US 13. The route follows Bayside Road for its entire length, providing access to Oyster via Sunnyside Road.

Major intersections

The entire route is in Northampton County.

| Location | mi | km | Destinations | Notes |
|---|---|---|---|---|
| Cape Junction | 0.00 | 0.00 | US 13 (Lankford Highway) SR 184 west (Stone Road) | |
| Cheriton | 1.59 | 2.56 | US 13 (Lankford Highway) | |
1.000 mi = 1.609 km; 1.000 km = 0.621 mi

=== Cheriton bypass route ===
U.S. Route 13 Bypass
- Location: Cheriton, Virginia

=== Eastville business loop ===
U.S. Route 13 Business
- Location: Eastville, Virginia
- Length: 2.71 mi (4.36 km)

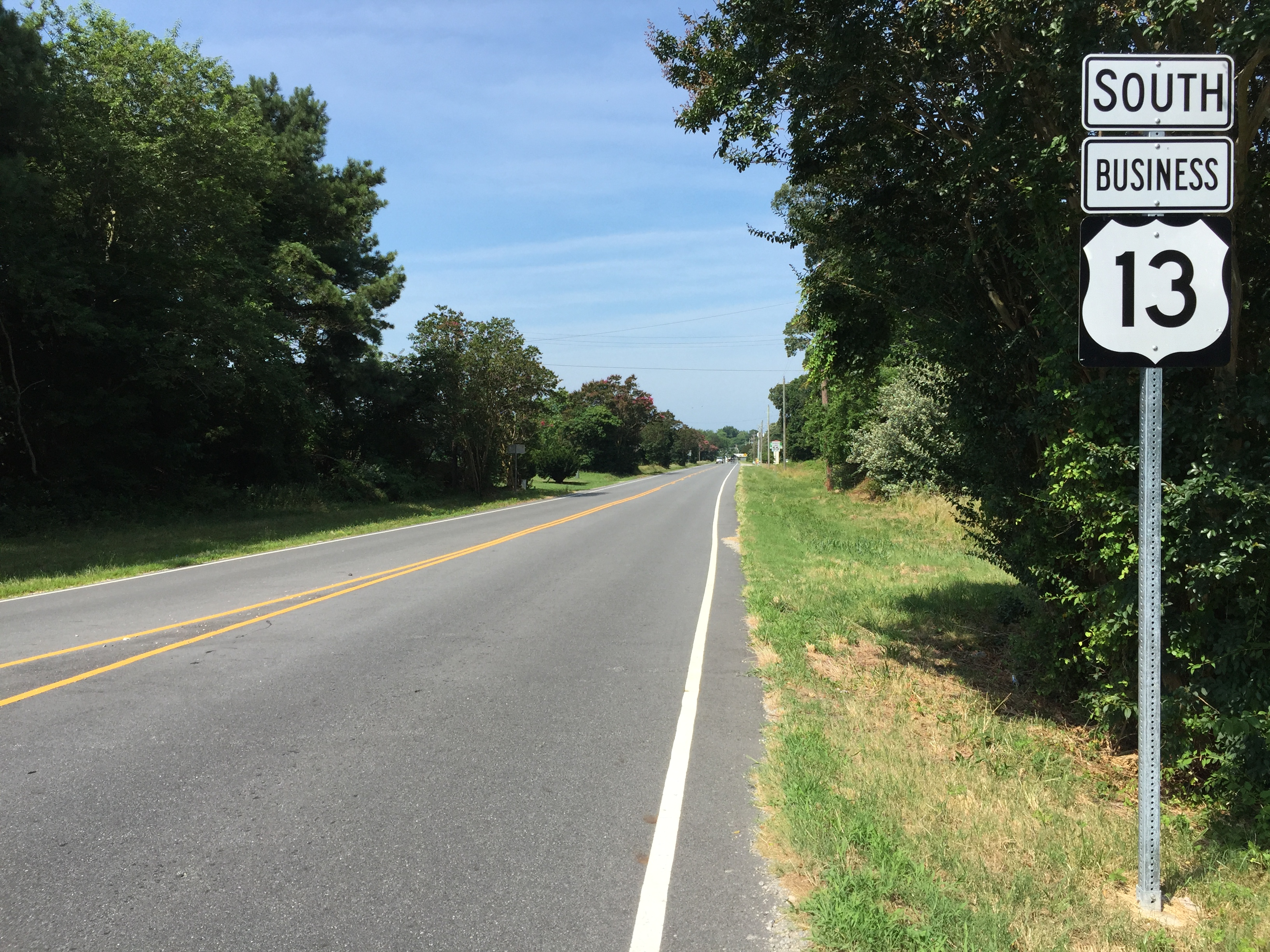
View south along US 13 Bus. at US 13 just north of Eastville

U.S. Route 13 Business (US 13 Bus.) is a business route of US 13 serving Eastville in the state of Virginia. It is a two-lane road which follows Courthouse Road for its entire length. It begins in Stumptown, where it leaves US 13 at an intersection to the west, passes through Eastville, and recombines with US 13 north of town in Kendall Grove. The route provides access to Old Town Neck Drive, which leads to the Chesapeake Bay.

Major intersections

The entire route is in Eastville, Northampton County.

| mi | km | Destinations | Notes |
|---|---|---|---|
| 0.00 | 0.00 | US 13 (Lankford Highway) | |
| 2.71 | 4.36 | US 13 (Lankford Highway) | |
1.000 mi = 1.609 km; 1.000 km = 0.621 mi

=== Eastville bypass route ===
U.S. Route 13 Bypass
- Location: Eastville, Virginia

=== Exmore business loop ===
U.S. Route 13 Business
- Location: Exmore, Virginia
- Length: 2.14 mi (3.44 km)

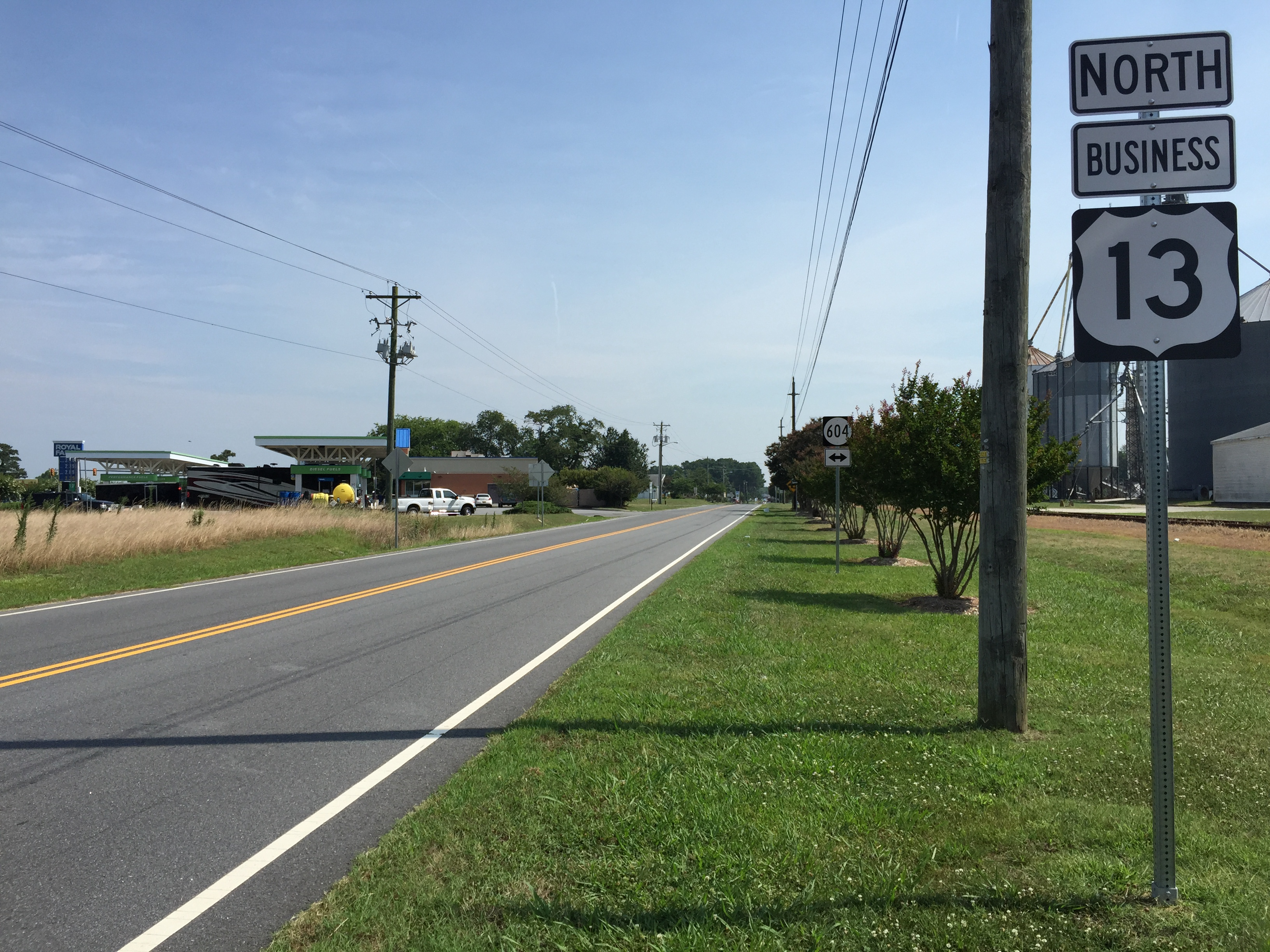
View north along US 13 Bus. at US 13 in Exmore

U.S. Route 13 Business (US 13 Bus.) is a business route of US 13 serving Exmore in the state of Virginia. It begins with an intersection south of town with US 13, parallel to a railroad alignment, and carries Exmore's Main Street. In town, it intersects SR 183 before leaving Main Street for Lincoln Avenue; Main Street continues as SR 178. Lincoln Avenue sends US 13 Bus. back to its parent just south of the Accomack County line.

Major intersections

The entire route is in Exmore, Northampton County.

| mi | km | Destinations | Notes |
|---|---|---|---|
| 0.00 | 0.00 | US 13 (Lankford Highway) | |
| | | SR 183 west (Occohannock Neck Road) | |
| 1.50 | 2.41 | SR 178 north (Main Street) to US 13 | |
| 2.14 | 3.44 | US 13 (Lankford Highway) | |
1.000 mi = 1.609 km; 1.000 km = 0.621 mi

=== Exmore bypass route ===
U.S. Route 13 Bypass
- Location: Exmore, Virginia

=== Onley–Accomac business loop ===
U.S. Route 13 Business
- Location: Onley–Accomac, Virginia
- Length: 5.73 mi (9.22 km)
- Tourist routes: Virginia Byway

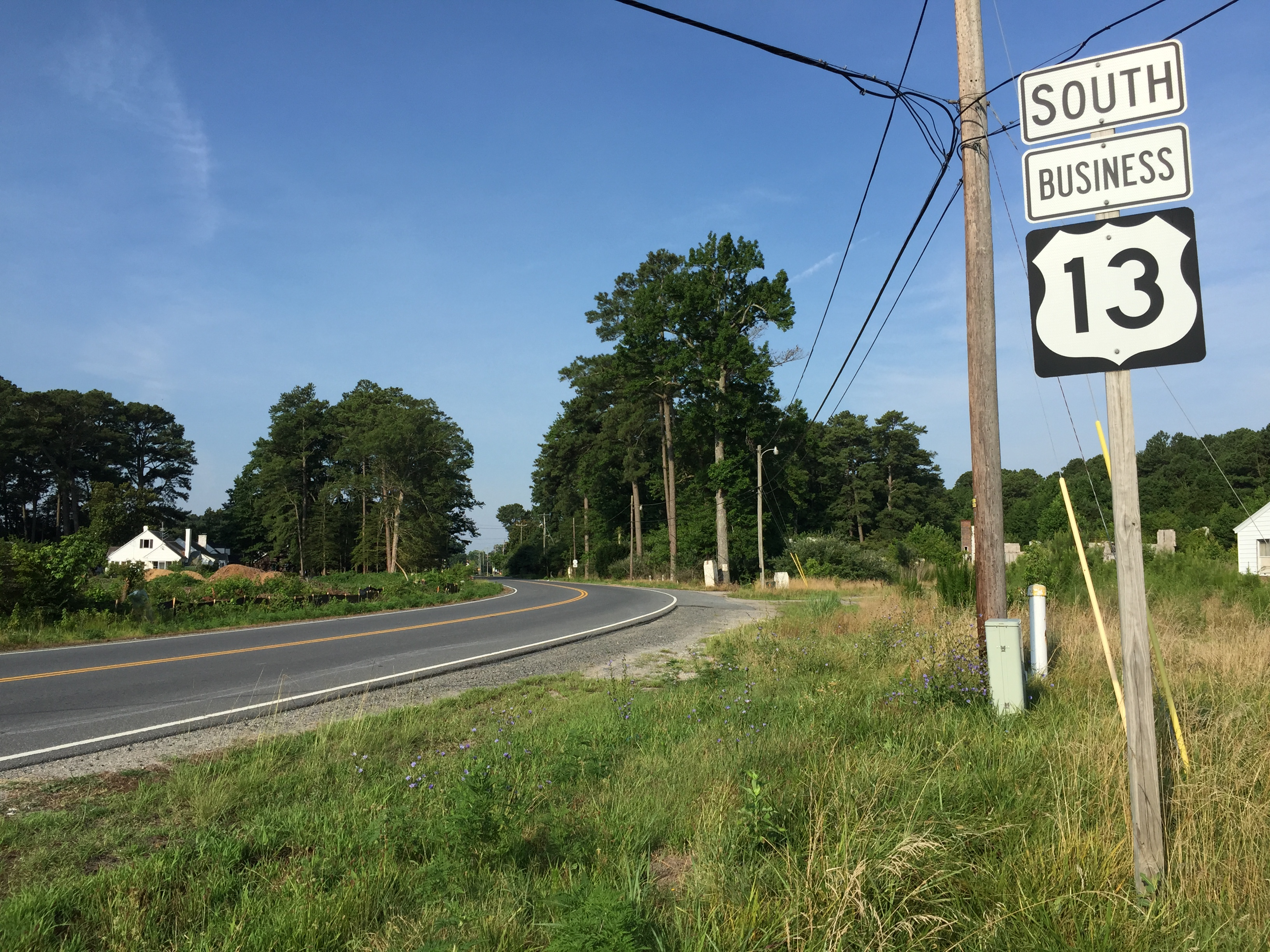
View south along US 13 Bus. at SR 659 in Tasley

U.S. Route 13 Business (US 13 Bus.) is a business route of US 13 serving Onley, Tasley, and Accomac in the state of Virginia, weaving across the parent US 13 several times. It begins in Onley in the south with an intersection with US 13, leaving the mainline route to the east and following Coastal Avenue. It closely parallels a railroad alignment as both of them pass under the mainline US 13 with no interchange, now following the route to its west. SR 650 intersects that route just before it curves to the northeast, meeting SR 316 (Greenbush Avenue) and SR 126 (Fairgrounds Road) at a roundabout. US 13 Business heads east here and takes on the name Tasley Road as it passes through Tasley. Tasley Road carries US 13 Bus. back toward its parent, intersecting it and continuing across as it enters Accomac on Front Street. Front Street eventually expands into a four-lane boulevard just before it rejoins mainline US 13, the southbound lanes intersecting with the north bound merging into it as a ramp.

Major intersections

The entire route is in Accomack County.

| Location | mi | km | Destinations | Notes |
|---|---|---|---|---|
| Onley | 0.00 | 0.00 | US 13 (Lankford Highway) | |
| Onley | | | SR 179 west (West Main Street) – Onancock | |
| Tasley | 1.35 | 2.17 | US 13 (Lankford Highway) | Interchange |
| Tasley | 1.77 | 2.85 | SR 126 west (Fairgrounds Road) – Onancock SR 316 north (Greenbush Road) – Parksley | Roundabout |
| Accomac | | | US 13 (Lankford Highway) | |
| Accomac | 5.73 | 9.22 | US 13 (Lankford Highway) | |
1.000 mi = 1.609 km; 1.000 km = 0.621 mi

=== Tasley bypass route ===
U.S. Route 13 Bypass
- Location: Tasley, Virginia

=== Accomac bypass route ===
U.S. Route 13 Bypass
- Location: Accomac, Virginia

== Maryland ==
=== Pocomoke City business loop ===
U.S. Route 13 Business
- Location: Pocomoke City, Maryland
- Length: 2.48 mi (3.99 km)
- Existed: 1994–present

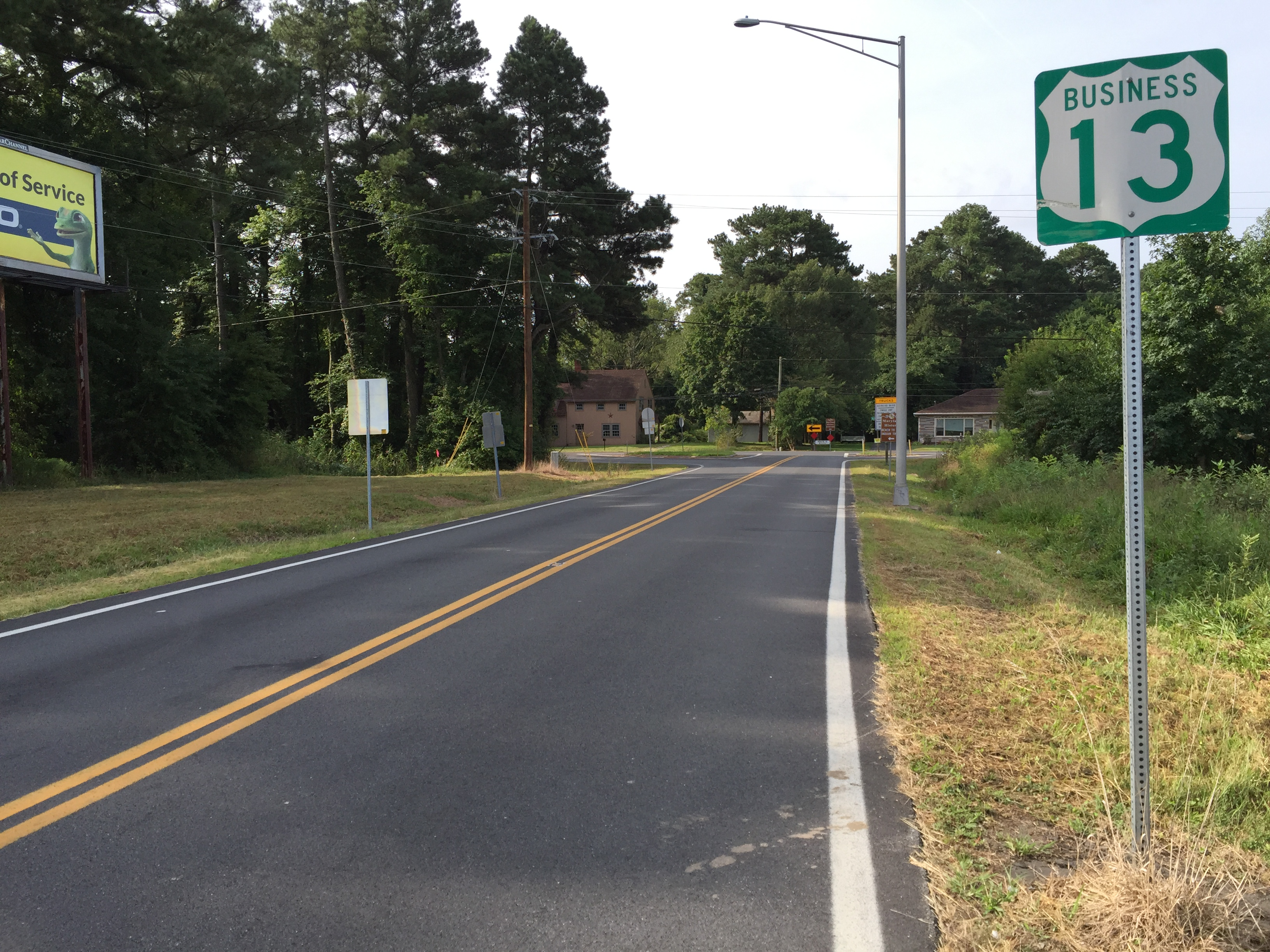
View south along US 13 Bus. past its northern terminus at US 13 just north of Pocomoke City

U.S. Route 13 Business (US 13 Bus.) is a 2.48-mile (3.99 km) business route of US 13 that passes through Pocomoke City in Worcester and Somerset counties in Maryland.

The route begins south of Pocomoke City; US 13's four-lane divided mainline curves away to the right around the town, while US 13 Bus. continues straight ahead as a two-lane town street.

After intersecting Maryland Route 366 (MD 366), the route connects with the original southern terminus of US 113, the latter having been rolled back to terminate at mainline US 13. For a time, the marooned segment was part of MD 250 but is now designated MD 250A. Continuing north, the route heads toward the city waterfront and business district, passing through a pair of intersections with traffic lights permanently set to "flash" mode due to lack of traffic.

The route soon reaches the Pocomoke River, crossing it on a drawbridge that was first constructed in the 1920s, reconstructed in the 1990s, and continues in active service today. After crossing the river, the route heads out of town into rural surroundings before terminating on US 13 at the southern terminus of MD 364.

The route was originally created as a segment of MD 675 by 1975, when the four-lane divided Ocean Highway opened around the eastern and northern edges of the town for US 13, allowing through traffic to avoid congested inner-city streets. The road was eventually designated US 13 Bus.

Major intersections

| County | Location | mi | km | Destinations | Notes |
|---|---|---|---|---|---|
| Worcester | Pocomoke City | 0.00 | 0.00 | US 13 south (Ocean Highway) | Southern terminus; access from US 13 Bus. to southbound US 13 and from northbound US 13 to US 13 Bus. |
| Worcester | Pocomoke City | 0.41 | 0.66 | MD 366 east (Stockton Road) – Stockton | Western terminus of MD 366 |
| Worcester | Pocomoke City | 0.50 | 0.80 | MD 250A north (Old Virginia Road) to US 113 | Southern terminus of MD 250A; former US 113/MD 250 |
| Worcester | Pocomoke City | 1.54 | 2.48 | 6th Street to MD 756 | |
| Worcester | Pocomoke City | 1.86 | 2.99 | 2nd Street to MD 371 | |
| Somerset | West Pocomoke | 2.48 | 3.99 | US 13 (Ocean Highway) / MD 364 north (Dividing Creek Road) – Salisbury, Pocomoke State Forest | Northern terminus; southern terminus of MD 364 |
1.000 mi = 1.609 km; 1.000 km = 0.621 mi: Incomplete access

=== Salisbury business loop ===
U.S. Route 13 Business
- Location: Fruitland–Salisbury, Maryland
- Length: 8.14 mi (13.10 km)
- Existed: 1982–present

U.S. Route 13 Business (US 13 Bus.) is a business route of US 13 in the state of Maryland. The highway runs 8.14 miles (13.10 km) between US 13 south of Fruitland and US 13 and US 50 on the north side of Salisbury. US 13 Bus. is a four-lane highway with divided and undivided sections that provides access to downtown Salisbury, where the highway intersects US 50 Bus., Salisbury University, and Fruitland, where the highway meets MD 513. US 13 Bus. was constructed as a new alignment of US 13 in several steps in the 1930s and early 1940s. The section of the highway through Salisbury was originally constructed with four lanes, while the portion of the highway through Fruitland and at the northern end was expanded to a divided highway in the first half of the 1950s. US 13 Bus. was designated when US 13 was moved to the Salisbury Bypass upon its completion in 1982.

== Maryland-Delaware ==
=== Delmar alternate route ===
U.S. Route 13 Alternate
- Location: Delmar, Maryland–Seaford, Delaware
- Length: 18.76 mi (30.19 km)
- Existed: 1954–1957

U.S. Route 13 Alternate (US 13 Alt.) was a 18.76-mile (30.19 km) alternate route extending from US 13 in Delmar, Maryland, to Hearne's Mill near Seaford, Delaware. US 13 Alt. began at US 13 south of Delmar in Wicomico County, Maryland, heading northwest into the town on two-lane undivided Bi State Boulevard. The road turned north and came to an intersection with MD 455, at which point it crossed the state line and entered Delmar in Sussex County, Delaware. The route continued north before it left Delmar and headed through rural areas, with a Pennsylvania Railroad line a short distance to the west and US 13 to the east. Farther north, US 13 Alt. entered Laurel, where it became Central Avenue. In Laurel, the route intersected DE 24 and crossed Broad Creek on a drawbridge. The road curved to the northwest and left the town and continued through rural land along Seaford Road, with the railroad tracks to the west and US 13 to the east. The route entered the town of Blades, where it headed north on and reached a junction with DE 20 at High Street. At this point, DE 20 turned north for a concurrency with US 13 Alt., and the two routes continued north, crossing the Nanticoke River on a drawbridge. Here, the road entered the city of Seaford and became Front Street, running north. On the northern edge of Seaford, DE 20 split from US 13 Alt. by turning west onto Stein Highway. From this point, US 13 Alt. left Seaford and became Bridgeville Highway, heading northeast through rural areas to its northern terminus at an intersection with US 13 at Hearne's Mill.

US 13 Alt. was designated in 1954 following the completion of a new divided highway alignment of US 13 between south of Delmar, Maryland, and north of Seaford, Delaware. The route was decommissioned in 1957. By 1983, the portion of the former route in Maryland was designated as a section of MD 675. The former route in Delaware is state-maintained and is designated as Road 13. Despite the fact that the road has been decommissioned, locals in Wicomico and Sussex counties still refer to the route as "Alternate 13" or "U.S. Route 13A".

Major intersections

| County | Location | mi | km | Destinations | Notes |
|---|---|---|---|---|---|
| Wicomico | Delmar | 0.00 | 0.00 | US 13 (Ocean Highway) – Salisbury | Southern terminus |
| Wicomico – Sussex | Delmar, MD – Delmar, DE | 2.09 | 3.36 | MD 455 (East State Street) | Maryland-Delaware state line, current Route 54 |
| Sussex | Laurel | 9.16 | 14.74 | DE 24 (Market Street) | |
| Sussex | Blades | 15.15 | 24.38 | DE 20 east (High Street) | South end of DE 20 overlap |
| Sussex | Seaford | 16.03 | 25.80 | DE 20 west (Stein Highway) – Federalsburg, West Seaford | North end of DE 20 overlap |
| Sussex | Seaford | 18.76 | 30.19 | US 13 (Sussex Highway) | Northern terminus |
1.000 mi = 1.609 km; 1.000 km = 0.621 mi: Concurrency terminus

== Delaware ==
=== Bridgeville business loop ===
U.S. Route 13 Business
- Location: Bridgeville, Delaware
- Length: 2.46 mi (3.96 km)
- Existed: 1970–present

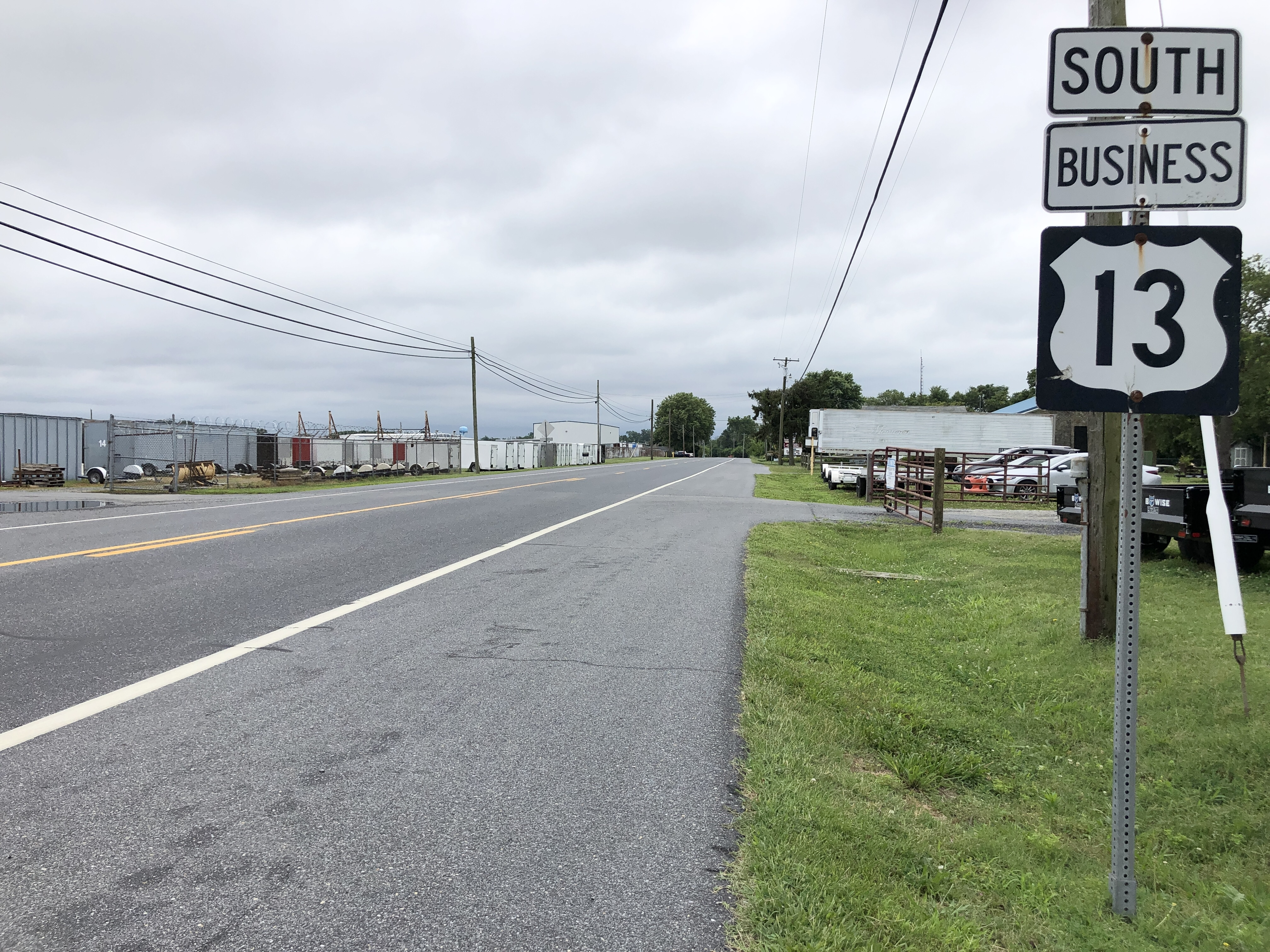
US 13 Bus. southbound past US 13/DE 404 north of Bridgeville

U.S. Route 13 Business (US 13 Bus.) is a 2.46-mile (3.96 km) business route of US 13 that passes through the town of Bridgeville in Sussex County, Delaware. The business route begins at an intersection with US 13 and DE 404 south of Bridgeville, where it heads west concurrent with DE 404 Bus. as four-lane divided South Main Street. The road immediately curves to the north as it passes to the west of businesses, narrowing into a two-lane undivided road. The route heads north-northwest through farmland before heading into Bridgeville, where it passes homes. In the center of town, DE 404 Bus. splits from US 13 Bus. by heading to the west. US 13 Bus. becomes North Main Street and curves to the north-northeast, leaving Bridgeville and heading through farmland with some development. The business route has a junction with Redden Road before it reaches its northern terminus at an intersection with US 13/DE 404 only accessible to and from the southbound lanes of US 13. US 13 Bus. has an annual average daily traffic count ranging from a high of 6,171 vehicles at the north end of the DE 404 Bus. concurrency to a low of 3,429 vehicles at the northern border of Bridgeville.

The route was originally built as a state highway south of Bridgeville by 1920 and north of Bridgeville by 1924 and received the US 13 designation in 1926. In 1952, US 13 was rerouted to bypass Bridgeville to the east on a new divided highway. The former alignment through Bridgeville became US 13 Alt. by 1957. US 13 Bus. was established in 1970, replacing the previous US 13 Alt. designation. In June 2007, a $15-million (equivalent to $21.8 million in 2024) project began that realigned the intersection at the southern terminus with US 13 and DE 404 from a skewed intersection to a perpendicular intersection and built service roads on both sides of US 13. The project was intended to improve safety at the intersection, which saw a high accident rate due to its design. Work on the project was completed on May 21, 2009, with the Delaware Department of Transportation (DelDOT) secretary Carolann Wicks and President of Commissioners for the Town of Bridgeville William Jefferson in attendance at a ceremony.

Major intersections

The entire route is in Bridgeville, Sussex County.

| mi | km | Destinations | Notes |
|---|---|---|---|
| 0.00 | 0.00 | US 13 / DE 404 west (Sussex Highway) – Seaford, Fenwick Island DE 404 east (Seashore Highway) – Georgetown, Beaches DE 404 Bus. begins | Southern terminus; south end of DE 404 Bus. overlap; eastern terminus of DE 404 Bus. |
| 1.50 | 2.41 | DE 404 Bus. west (Market Street) | North end of DE 404 Bus. overlap |
| 2.46 | 3.96 | US 13 south / DE 404 east (Sussex Highway) | Northern terminus; no access to or from northbound US 13/westbound DE 404 |
1.000 mi = 1.609 km; 1.000 km = 0.621 mi: Concurrency terminus; Incomplete access

=== Bridgeville alternate route ===
U.S. Route 13 Alternate
- Location: Bridgeville, Delaware
- Length: 2.46 mi (3.96 km)
- Existed: 1957–1970

U.S. Route 13 Alternate (US 13 Alt.) was a 2.46-mile (3.96 km) alternate route of US 13 that passed through the town of Bridgeville in Sussex County, Delaware. US 13 Alt. began at an intersection with US 13 and DE 404 southeast of Bridgeville, heading northwest concurrent with DE 404 on two-lane undivided Main Street. The road entered Bridgeville and headed north through the town, with DE 404 splitting from US 13 Alt. by heading west along Market Street. US 13 Alt. left Bridgeville and continued northeast to its terminus at another intersection with US 13. US 13 Alt. was designated in 1957 on the former routing of US 13 through Bridgeville that was bypassed. US 13 Alt. was decommissioned in 1970 when it was replaced with US 13 Bus.

Major intersections

The entire route was in Bridgeville, Sussex County.

| mi | km | Destinations | Notes |
|---|---|---|---|
| 0.00 | 0.00 | US 13 (Sussex Highway) – Seaford, Fenwick Island DE 404 east (Seashore Highway) – Georgetown, Beaches | Southern terminus; south end of DE 404 overlap |
| 1.50 | 2.41 | DE 404 west (Market Street) | North end of DE 404 overlap |
| 2.46 | 3.96 | US 13 south (Sussex Highway) | Northern terminus; no access to or from northbound US 13 |
1.000 mi = 1.609 km; 1.000 km = 0.621 mi: Concurrency terminus; Incomplete access

=== Camden alternate route ===
U.S. Route 13 Alternate
- Location: Woodside–Camden, Delaware
- Length: 5.69 mi (9.16 km)
- Existed: 1952–present
- Tourist routes: Harriet Tubman Underground Railroad Byway

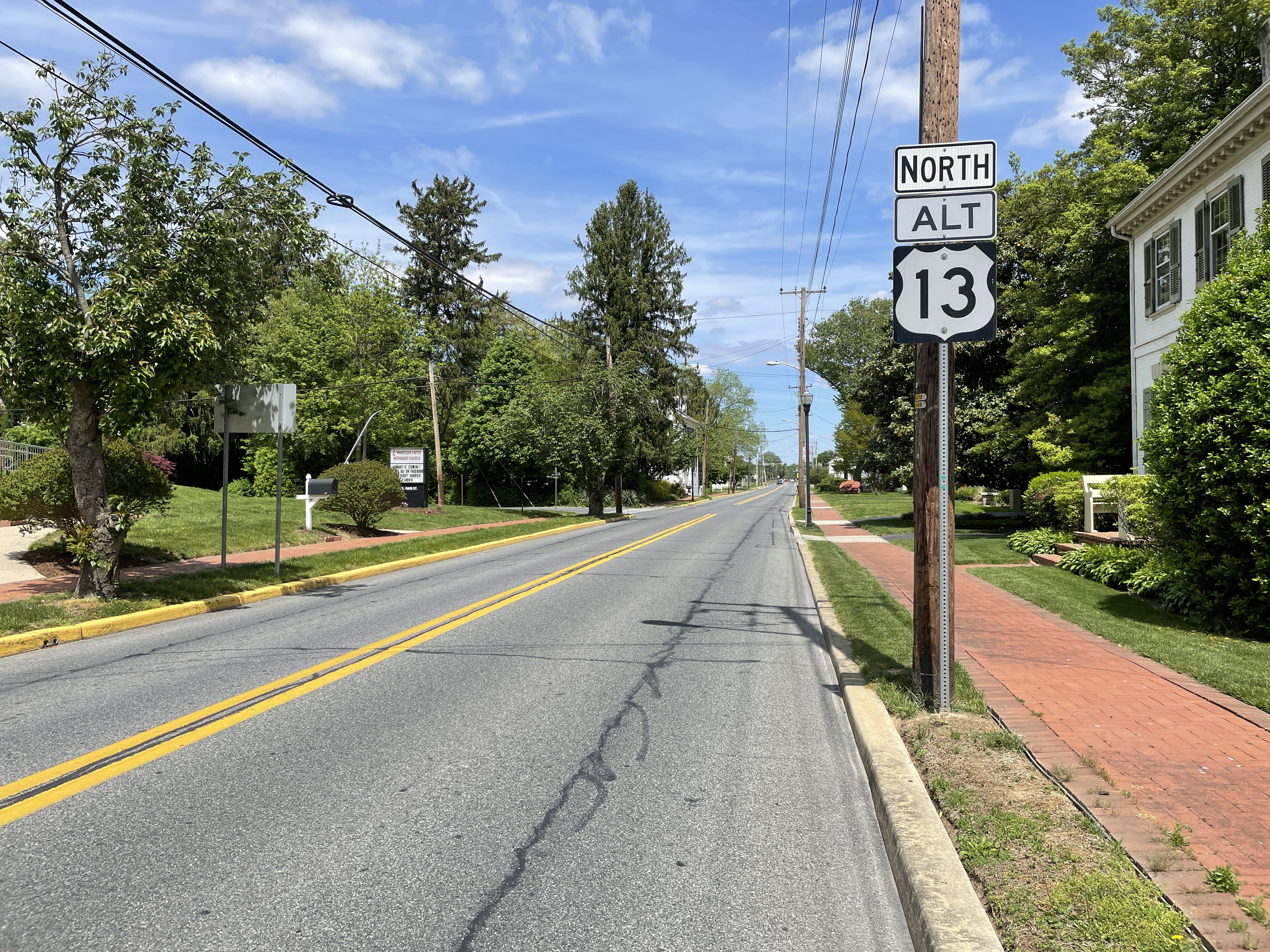
US 13 Alt. northbound past DE 10 in Camden

U.S. Route 13 Alternate (US 13 Alt.) is a 5.69-mile (9.16 km) alternate route of US 13 that passes through the towns of Woodside and Camden in Kent County, Delaware. The route's southern terminus is at US 13 and DE 15 near Canterbury. From here, US 13 Alt. heads northwest concurrent with DE 15 on two-lane undivided Upper King Road. The alternate route passes through farmland with some homes before reaching Woodside. In this town, the road heads through residential areas and intersects DE 10 Alt., where DE 15 splits from US 13 Alt. by heading west along DE 10 Alt. US 13 Alt. leaves Woodside and runs north through a mix of farmfields and woods with some homes, crossing Tidbury Creek to the east of Derby Pond. The route curves northeast and passes a mix of agricultural areas and residential subdivisions before it enters Camden. In this town, the road becomes Main Street and is lined with homes, crossing DE 10. US 13 Alt. continues past more residences and businesses and crosses Old North Road, where it becomes Old Camden Road and heads to the east of Caesar Rodney High School. The alternate route intersects Caboose Road, a one-way road which heads east to provide access to US 13. A short distance later, US 13 Alt. reaches its northern terminus at an intersection with US 13 in the northern part of Camden east of Brecknock County Park. The portion of the route between Voshells Mill Road and a point north of Old North Road in Camden is part of the Harriet Tubman Underground Railroad Byway, a Delaware Byway. US 13 Alt. has an annual average daily traffic count ranging from a high of 10,269 vehicles at the South Street intersection in Camden to a low of 3,845 vehicles at the southern border of Woodside.

By 1920, the portion of road south of Woodside was under contract as a state highway while the portion north of there was proposed as one. The state highway was completed by 1924 and was designated as US 13 in 1926. In 1952, US 13 was rerouted to a new divided highway alignment to the east of Woodside and Camden, and US 13 Alt. was designated onto the former alignment that was bypassed.

Major intersections

The entire route is in Kent County.

| Location | mi | km | Destinations | Notes |
|---|---|---|---|---|
| Canterbury | 0.00 | 0.00 | US 13 / DE 15 south (South Dupont Highway) | South end of DE 15 overlap; southern terminus |
| Woodside | 1.76 | 2.83 | DE 10 Alt. / DE 15 north (Main Street/Walnut Shade Road) – Petersburg, Rising Sun | North end of DE 15 overlap |
| Camden | 4.89 | 7.87 | DE 10 (Camden Wyoming Avenue) – Willow Grove | |
| Camden | 5.35 | 8.61 | Caboose Road to US 13 (South Dupont Highway) | One-way eastbound |
| Camden | 5.69 | 9.16 | US 13 south (South Dupont Highway) | No access from northbound US 13 Alt. to northbound US 13; northern terminus |
1.000 mi = 1.609 km; 1.000 km = 0.621 mi: Concurrency terminus; Incomplete access

=== Dover alternate route ===
U.S. Route 13 Alternate
- Location: Dover, Delaware
- Length: 3.86 mi (6.21 km)
- Existed: 1959–present
- Tourist routes: Harriet Tubman Underground Railroad Byway

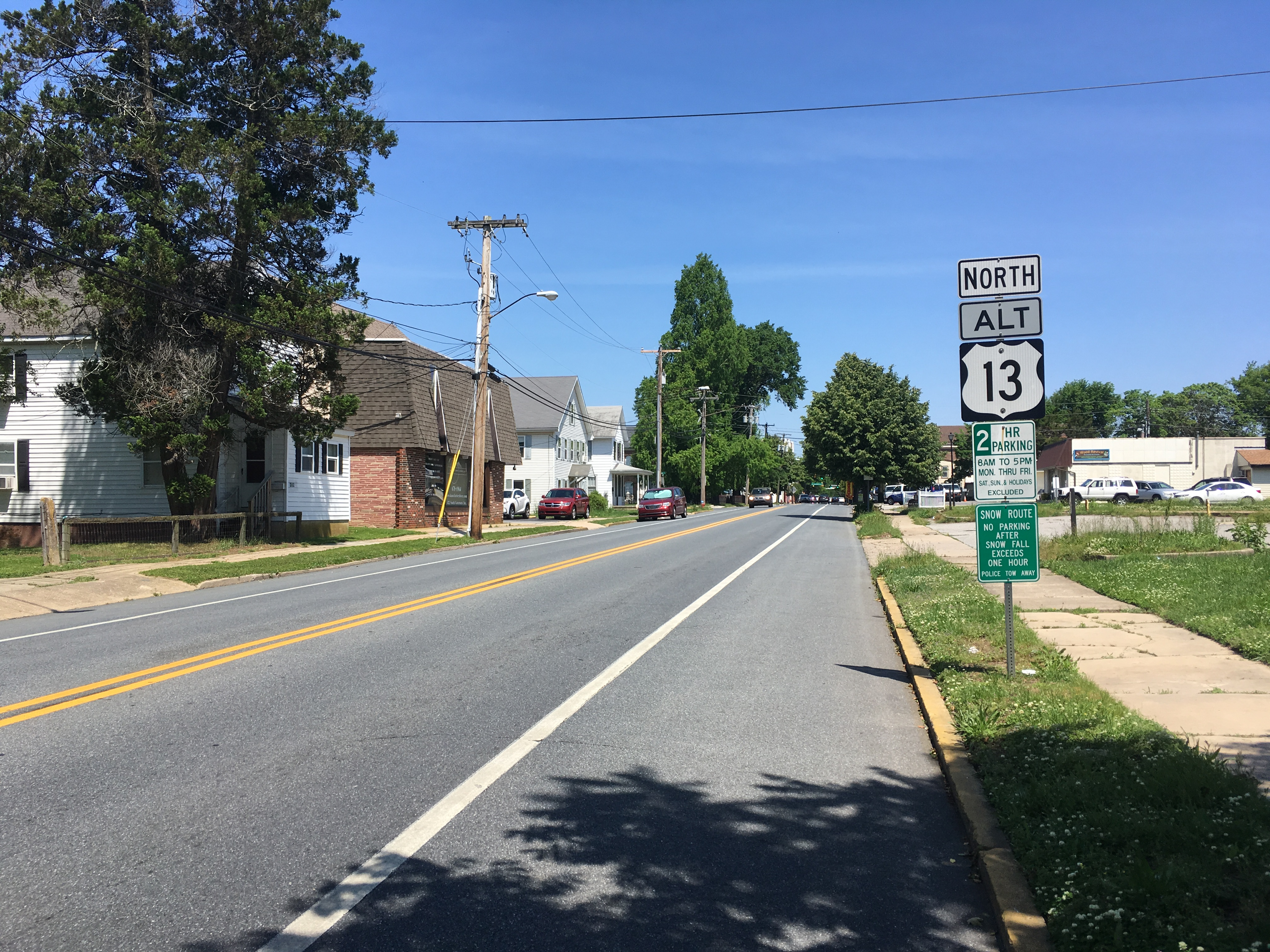
US 13 Alt. northbound past Water Street in Dover

U.S. Route 13 Alternate (US 13 Alt.) is a 3.86-mile (6.21 km) alternate route of US 13 that passes through the downtown area of the city of Dover in Kent County, Delaware. The route's southern terminus is at US 13 in Rodney Village; this intersection has no access from southbound US 13 Alt. to northbound US 13. From here, the alternate route heads north on South Governors Avenue, a three-lane road with a center left-turn lane. The road passes homes to the west and businesses to the east, entering Dover at the Webbs Lane intersection. The route curves northeast past more commercial establishments prior to bending north and crossing Puncheon Run, passing through residential areas with a few businesses. US 13 Alt. heads into more commercial areas and passes to the west of Bayhealth Hospital, Kent Campus, where it bends to the north-northwest. At this point, the route loses the center turn lane and becomes a two-lane undivided road. The road heads into downtown Dover, where it intersects West Loockerman Street. The route becomes lined with homes before it crosses DE 8. Past this intersection, US 13 Alt. becomes North Governors Avenue and passes to the west of the Delaware State University Downtown campus before it continues through residential areas. The route splits from North Governors Avenue and heads northeast on Governors Boulevard to an intersection with Walker Road and North State Street. At this intersection, US 13 Alt. turns north onto four-lane undivided North State Street and crosses Silver Lake. The road heads into business areas and gains a center left-turn lane while it carries two northbound lanes and one southbound lane. US 13 Alt. reaches its northern terminus at an intersection with US 13 and Leipsic Road near Dover Motor Speedway and the Bally's Dover hotel, casino, and harness racetrack; this intersection has no access from northbound US 13 to southbound US 13 Alt. The portion of the route between North State Street/Walker Road and the northern terminus at US 13 in Dover is part of the Harriet Tubman Underground Railroad Byway, a Delaware Byway. US 13 Alt. has an annual average daily traffic count ranging from a high of 14,324 vehicles at the northern terminus at US 13 to a low of 5,311 vehicles at the Walker Road intersection.

State Street through Dover was originally designated as part of US 13 in 1926, while Governors Avenue became part of a realigned US 13 in 1930 after it was reconstructed. In 1937, the narrow crossing of Silver Lake was replaced with a new, wider bridge. In April 1952, US 13 was shifted to a divided highway bypass to the east of downtown Dover. US 13 Alt. was designated onto the former alignment of US 13 through downtown Dover by 1959.

Major intersections

The entire route is in Kent County.

| Location | mi | km | Destinations | Notes |
|---|---|---|---|---|
| Rodney Village | 0.00 | 0.00 | US 13 south (South Dupont Highway) | No access from southbound US 13 Alt. to northbound US 13; southern terminus |
| Dover | 2.44 | 3.93 | DE 8 (West Division Street) | |
| Dover | 3.86 | 6.21 | US 13 (North Dupont Highway) – Smyrna, Camden | No access from northbound US 13 to southbound US 13 Alt.; northern terminus |
1.000 mi = 1.609 km; 1.000 km = 0.621 mi: Incomplete access

=== Wilmington business loop ===
U.S. Route 13 Business
- Location: Wilmington, Delaware
- Length: 8.19 mi (13.18 km)
- Existed: 1970–present
- Tourist routes: Harriet Tubman Underground Railroad Byway; Washington–Rochambeau Revolutionary Route

U.S. Route 13 Business (US 13 Bus.) is an 8.19-mile (13.18 km) business route of US 13 that runs through the heart of the city of Wilmington in New Castle County, Delaware, where US 13 bypasses downtown Wilmington to the east, running near Interstate 495 (I-495) and the Delaware River. US 13 Bus. begins at US 13 at the southern border of Wilmington and heads north toward the downtown area, where it splits into a one-way pair. Past downtown, the business route heads through the northeastern part of the city on North Market Street before continuing through suburban Brandywine Hundred on Philadelphia Pike. US 13 Bus. reaches its northern terminus at US 13 in Claymont. US 13 Bus. is a four-lane road for much of its length. The portion of the route between A Street and DE 9 (4th Street) in Wilmington is part of the Harriet Tubman Underground Railroad Byway, a Delaware Byway. The Philadelphia Pike was built in the 1820s and improved to a state highway by 1920. US 13 was designated to run through downtown Wilmington and along Philadelphia Pike in 1926. US 13 Bus. was designated in 1970 when US 13 was routed to bypass Wilmington along the former US 13 Alt.

=== Wilmington alternate route ===
U.S. Route 13 Alternate
- Location: Wilmington, Delaware
- Length: 8.70 mi (14.00 km)
- Existed: 1939–1970

U.S. Route 13 Alternate (US 13 Alt.) was an 8.70-mile (14.00 km) alternate route of US 13 located in the city of Wilmington in the state of Delaware. The route served as an eastern bypass of the city. US 13 Alt. began at an intersection with US 13/US 202 at the southern edge of the city of Wilmington, heading northeast on Heald Street. The route crossed a Reading Company railroad line at-grade before it curved to the north-northeast and came to a bridge over a Penn Central Transportation Company railroad line. US 13 Alt. came to an intersection with the northern terminus of DE 9 before it reached Christiana Avenue, where it turned northwest and crossed over the Christina River on a drawbridge. At this point, the alternate route became 4th Street and passed under a Penn Central Transportation Company railroad line before it turned northeast onto the one-way pair of Church Street northbound and Spruce Street southbound. US 13 Alt. ran through the eastern portion of the city before both directions rejoined at 11th Street. The route headed northeast and passed over Brandywine Creek, becoming a divided highway called Northeast Boulevard that ran through more of Wilmington. The road curved east and left Wilmington, becoming Governor Printz Boulevard and passing through the community of Edgemoor. Here, US 13 Alt. turned northeast and ran parallel to a Penn Central Transportation Company railroad line and the Delaware River, both to the east of the route. The road continued past Holly Oak before it reached Claymont. Here, US 13 Alt. turned northwest and came to its northern terminus at an intersection with US 13.

Plans were made in 1918 for a bypass to the east of downtown Wilmington for through traffic, avoiding Market Street. The bypass would utilize Heald, Church, and Spruce streets and would construct Northeast Boulevard heading northeast from the Eleventh Street Bridge. The bypass was needed as Philadelphia Pike had steep grades that were difficult for trucks at the time. In 1934, the state highway department began work on this bypass. Among them was the improvement of Church and Spruce streets by widening and paving them. In addition, the Northeast Boulevard was built, running from the Eleventh Street Bridge over the Brandywine Creek northeast to Edgemoor Road in Edgemoor. Construction began this year on an extension of the road northeast to Holly Oak. The following year, the Northeast Boulevard was completed between Edgemoor and Holly Oak. The construction of the Northeast Boulevard led to increased residential and industrial development along the route. In the later part of 1936, construction began on the portion of the Wilmington bypass along Heald Street along with Northeast Boulevard (renamed Governor Printz Boulevard) between Holly Oak and Claymont. Both of these projects were finished in late 1937 and completed a bypass of the portion of US 13 through Wilmington. This bypass route was designated as US 13 Alt. in 1939. In 1939, construction was authorized to widen Governor Printz Boulevard into a divided highway. The widening of the road to a divided highway was completed in 1940. In 1942, a bridge was completed on Heald Street that eliminated the grade crossing with a Pennsylvania Railroad line. US 13 Alt. was widened to four lanes between 11th Street and 30th Street in Wilmington in 1956. In 1970, US 13 was rerouted to bypass downtown Wilmington on the US 13 Alt. alignment while US 13 Bus. was designated onto the former US 13 alignment from the southern border of Wilmington to Claymont.

Major intersections

The entire route was in New Castle County.

| Location | mi | km | Destinations | Notes |
|---|---|---|---|---|
| Wilmington | 0.00 | 0.00 | US 13 / US 202 (Dupont Highway/South Walnut Street) – Delaware Memorial Bridge, Dover, Wilmington | Southern terminus |
| Wilmington | 1.25 | 2.01 | DE 9 south (New Castle Avenue) – New Castle | Northern terminus of DE 9 |
| Claymont | 8.70 | 14.00 | US 13 (Philadelphia Pike) | Northern terminus |
1.000 mi = 1.609 km; 1.000 km = 0.621 mi

== Delaware-Pennsylvania ==
=== Marcus Hook bypass route ===
U.S. Route 13 Bypass
- Location: Claymont, Delaware–Chester, Pennsylvania
- Existed: by 1950–1960s

U.S. Route 13 Bypass (US 13 Byp.) was a bypass of a portion of US 13 between Claymont, Delaware and Chester, Pennsylvania, bypassing Marcus Hook, Pennsylvania. The bypass route split from US 13 in Claymont, heading northwest on Naamans Road (present-day DE 92) before turning northeast onto Ridge Road. The road crossed into Pennsylvania and continued along Ridge Road through Lower Chichester Township, passing through the community of Linwood, where it intersected PA 452. The bypass then continued through Trainer. US 13 Byp. continued into Chester and became 9th Street, ending at US 13 at the intersection of 9th Street and Highland Avenue at which point US 13 continued along 9th Street. Pennsylvania Route 891 (PA 891) was designated to run between the Delaware border and US 13 in Chester along Ridge Road and 9th Street by 1940. US 13 Byp. was designated by 1950, replacing the PA 891 designation in Pennsylvania. US 13 Byp. was decommissioned in the 1960s.

Major intersections

| State | County | Location | mi | km | Destinations | Notes |
|---|---|---|---|---|---|---|
| Delaware | New Castle | Claymont | | | US 13 (Philadelphia Pike) | Southern terminus |
| Pennsylvania | Delaware | Lower Chichester Township | | | PA 452 (Market Street) | |
| Pennsylvania | Delaware | Chester | | | US 13 (9th Street/Highland Avenue) | Northern terminus |
1.000 mi = 1.609 km; 1.000 km = 0.621 mi

== Pennsylvania ==
=== Chester business loop ===
U.S. Route 13 Business
- Location: Trainer–Chester, Pennsylvania
- Length: 3.431 mi (5.522 km)
- Existed: 2022–present

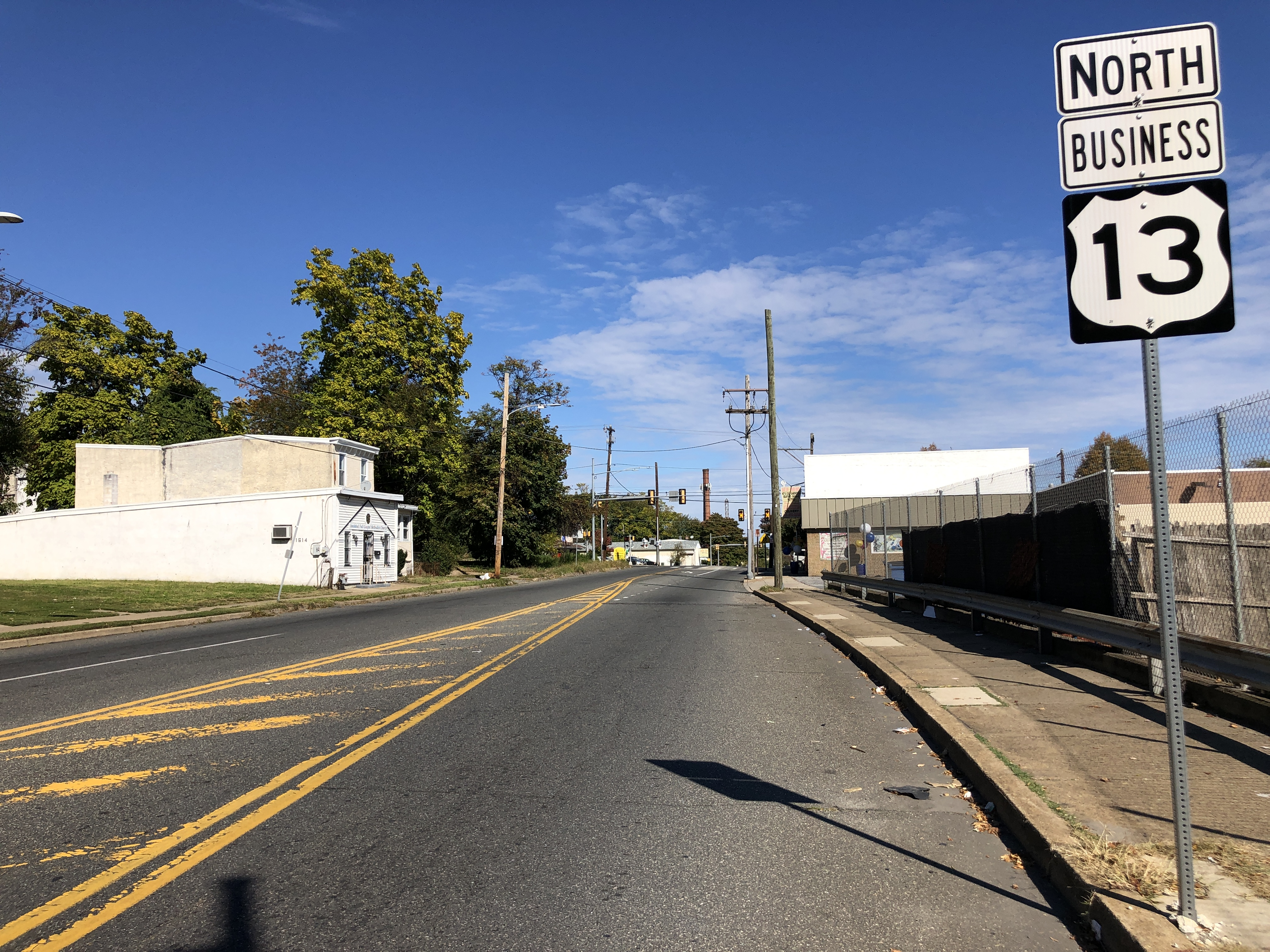
US 13 Bus. northbound past US 322 in Chester

U.S. Route 13 Business (US 13 Bus.) is a business route of US 13 in Chester, Pennsylvania, that follows the former alignment of US 13 along Post Road, 4th Street, Highland Avenue, and 9th Street between US 13 and PA 291 in Trainer and US 13 at Morton Avenue in Chester. US 13 Bus. begins at an intersection with US 13 and the western terminus of PA 291 in the borough of Trainer, heading northeast along two-lane undivided Post Road. The road continues through urban residential and industrial areas as it enters the city of Chester, where the road name becomes West 4th Street. US 13 Bus. passes near urban homes and businesses, turning northwest onto Highland Avenue. The route passes under Amtrak's Northeast Corridor railroad line east of Highland Avenue station serving SEPTA's Wilmington/Newark Line before running past more homes and turning northeast onto West 9th Street. US 13 Bus. continues through urban neighborhoods and passes the former Community Hospital of Chester. The route comes to a partial interchange with the US 322 freeway providing access to and from the Commodore Barry Bridge over the Delaware River. Following this, the road continues past urban residences and businesses, passing south of Chester High School and crossing Chester Creek. Past this, the name of the road changes to East 9th Street. US 13 Bus. reaches a junction with the southern terminus of PA 352 and Avenue of the States and continues northeast to intersect PA 320, which is routed on the one-way pair of Madison Street northbound and Upland Street southbound. The route reaches its northern terminus at US 13 at Morton Avenue.

In November 2020, the American Association of State Highway and Transportation Officials approved the realignment of US 13 through Chester along PA 291 and Morton Avenue and the establishment of US 13 Bus. along the former alignment of US 13. Sign changes were completed on February 11, 2022.

Major intersections

The entire route is in Delaware County.

| Location | mi | km | Destinations | Notes |
|---|---|---|---|---|
| Trainer | 0.000 | 0.000 | US 13 / PA 291 east (Post Road/Price Street) | Southern terminus; western terminus of PA 291 |
| Chester | 1.541 | 2.480 | US 322 east (Commodore Barry Bridge) / Flower Street – Bridgeport, NJ | Interchange; entrance to eastbound US 322 and exit from westbound US 322 |
| Chester | 3.010 | 4.844 | PA 352 north (Edgmont Avenue) | Southern terminus of PA 352 |
| Chester | 3.132 | 5.040 | PA 320 north (Madison Street) | |
| Chester | 3.218 | 5.179 | PA 320 south (Upland Street) | |
| Chester | 3.431 | 5.522 | US 13 (Morton Avenue) to I-95 north | Northern terminus |
1.000 mi = 1.609 km; 1.000 km = 0.621 mi: Incomplete access

=== Chester bypass route ===
U.S. Route 13 Bypass
- Location: Chester–Collingdale, Pennsylvania

U.S. Route 13 Bypass (US 13 Byp.) was a bypass of US 13 between Chester and Collingdale in Delaware County, Pennsylvania. The route began at US 13 in Chester, heading north on Kerlin Street. US 13 Byp. crossed the Chester Creek into Upland, where it turned east onto Upland Avenue, heading northeast back into Chester. Upon crossing PA 352, the bypass route headed east on 22nd Street, intersecting PA 320 before crossing the Ridley Creek out of Chester. Here, US 13 Byp. continued northeast along MacDade Boulevard through suburban areas. The route crossed PA 420 north of Prospect Park before it reached its northern terminus at an intersection with US 13 in Collingdale. Pennsylvania Route 520 (PA 520) was first designated by 1930 to follow 22nd Street and MacDade Boulevard between PA 352 in Chester and US 13 in Darby. US 13 Byp. was designated in the 1940s, replacing the PA 520 designation along 22nd Street and MacDade Boulevard. US 13 Byp. was decommissioned in the 1960s.

Major intersections

The entire route was in Delaware County.

| Location | mi | km | Destinations | Notes |
|---|---|---|---|---|
| Chester | | | US 13 (9th Street) | Southern terminus |
| Chester | | | PA 352 (Edgmont Avenue) | |
| Chester | | | PA 320 (Providence Avenue) | |
| Ridley Township | | | PA 420 (Kedron Avenue) | |
| Collingdale | | | US 13 (MacDade Boulevard/Chester Pike) | Northern terminus |
1.000 mi = 1.609 km; 1.000 km = 0.621 mi

=== Philadelphia bypass route ===
U.S. Route 13 Bypass
- Location: Darby–Hunting Park, Pennsylvania

U.S. Route 13 Bypass (US 13 Byp.) was a bypass of a portion of US 13 in Philadelphia, Pennsylvania. It split from US 13 in Darby, Delaware County. The route headed north on Main Street before becoming Lansdowne Avenue and running through Yeadon, Lansdowne, and Upper Darby Township. In Llanerch, US 13 Byp. turned northeast to form a concurrency with US 1 on Township Line Road and crossing PA 3. The two routes continued northeast and became City Avenue, forming the border between Montgomery County to the northwest and Philadelphia to the southeast. Along City Avenue, the bypass route intersected US 30 Byp. (Haverford Road/Avenue), US 30, and PA 23 (Conshohocken State Road/Conshohocken Avenue). At an interchange with I-80S, US 1 split from US 13 Byp. and US 13 Byp. crossed the Schuylkill River and fully entered Philadelphia. Here, the route came to an interchange with US 422 (Ridge Avenue) and Lincoln Drive and ran east along East River Drive to reach its northern terminus at an intersection with US 1/US 13 (Hunting Park Avenue) in the Hunting Park section of the city. US 13 Byp. was first designated by 1940, where it followed Main Street and Lansdowne Avenue to Llanerch, where it picked up a concurrency with US 1 Byp. and continued northeast along Township Line Road, City Avenue, East River Drive, Hunting Park Avenue, and Roosevelt Boulevard to Levick Street, where US 13 Byp. ended and US 13 continued along Levick Street. By 1950, the northern terminus of US 13 Byp. was cut back to Broad Street along Roosevelt Boulevard, being replaced by mainline US 13 north of there. The northern terminus was further scaled back to Hunting Park Avenue and East River Drive by 1960, with more of mainline US 13 replacing the bypass designation. Also by this time, the US 1 Byp. concurrency was removed, with mainline US 1 running concurrent with US 13 Byp. on Township Line Road, City Avenue, and East River Drive. US 13 Byp. was decommissioned in the 1960s.

Major intersections

| County | Location | mi | km | Destinations | Notes |
|---|---|---|---|---|---|
| Delaware | Darby | | | US 13 (MacDade Boulevard) | Southern terminus |
| Delaware | Upper Darby | | | US 1 south (Township Line Road) – Media | South end of US 1 overlap |
| Delaware | Upper Darby | | | PA 3 (West Chester Pike) | |
| Montgomery–Philadelphia county line | Lower Merion Township–Philadelphia line | | | US 30 Byp. (Haverford Road/Haverford Avenue) | |
| Montgomery–Philadelphia county line | Lower Merion Township–Philadelphia line | | | US 30 (Lancaster Avenue) | |
| Montgomery–Philadelphia county line | Lower Merion Township–Philadelphia line | | | PA 23 (Conshohocken State Road/Conshohocken Avenue) | |
| Montgomery–Philadelphia county line | Lower Merion Township–Philadelphia line | | | I-80S / PA 43 (Schuylkill Expressway) – Valley Forge, Central Philadelphia | Interchange |
| Philadelphia | Philadelphia | | | US 422 (Ridge Avenue); Lincoln Drive | Interchange |
| Philadelphia | Philadelphia | | | US 1 north / US 13 (Hunting Park Avenue) | Northern terminus, north end of US 1 overlap |
1.000 mi = 1.609 km; 1.000 km = 0.621 mi

=== Bensalem Township alternate truck route ===
U.S. Route 13 Alternate Truck
- Location: Bensalem Township, Pennsylvania
- Existed: 2013–present

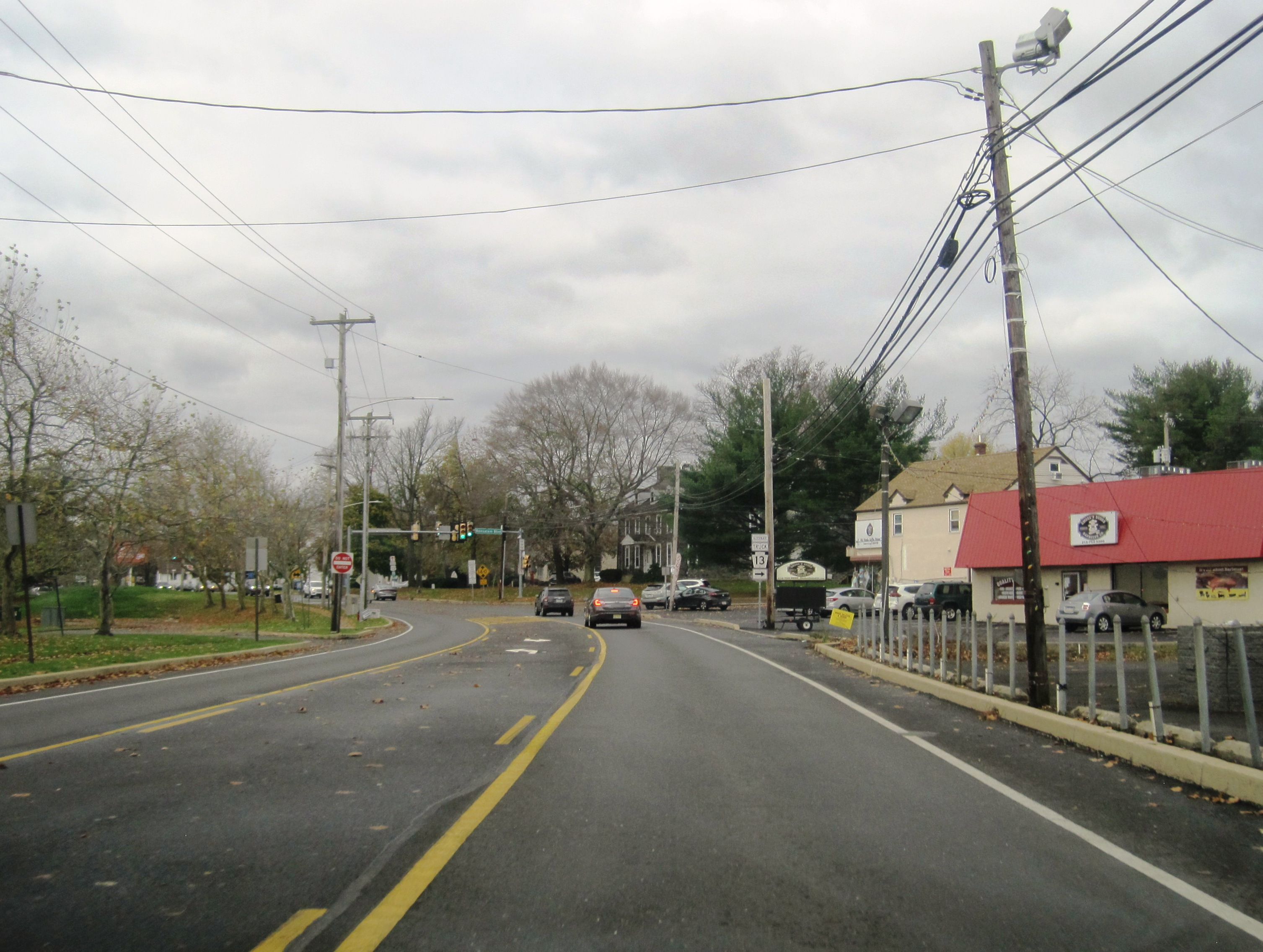
Southbound US 13 approaching US 13 Alt. Truck at Bensalem Boulevard in Bensalem (erroneously signed as PA 13)

U.S. Route 13 Alternate Truck (US 13 Alt. Truck) is a truck route around a weight-restricted bridge on US 13 over the St. Francis Creek in Bensalem Township, Pennsylvania, on which trucks over 32 short tons (29 t; 29 long tons) and combination loads over 40 short tons (36 t; 36 long tons) are prohibited. The route follows PA 132, PA 513, Gibson Road, and Bensalem Boulevard. US 13 Alt. Truck was signed in 2013.

== See also ==
- List of special routes of the United States Numbered Highway System
