= Cow Marsh Old School Baptist Church =

Historic church in Delaware, United States

- U.S. National Register of Historic Places
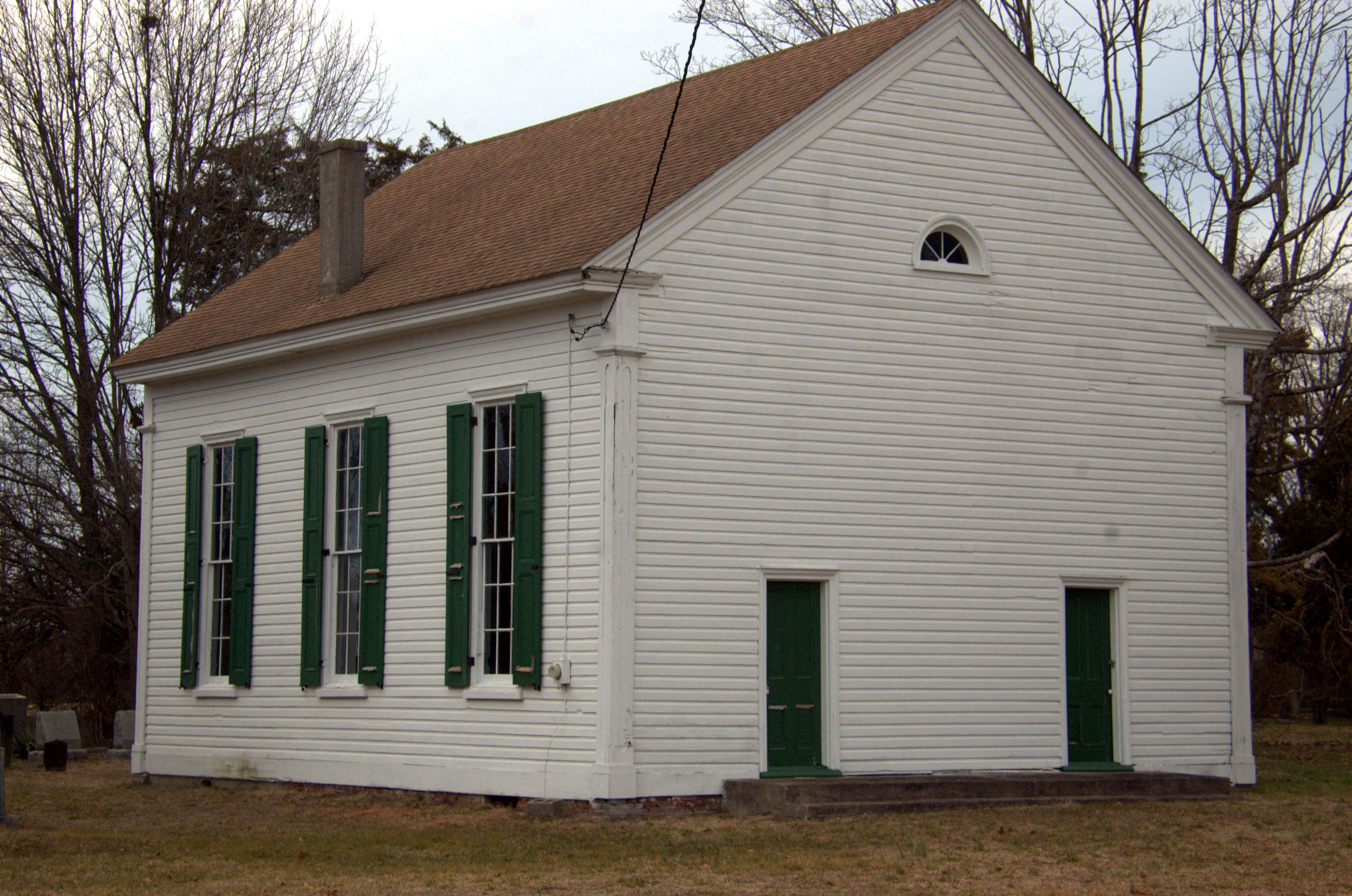

- Location within Delaware Location within the United States
- Location: Northeast of Sandtown on Delaware Route 10, near Sandtown, Delaware
- Coordinates: 39°2′31″N 75°41′42″W
- Area: 2.5 acres (1.0 ha)
- Built: 1872
- NRHP reference No.: 76000571
- Added to NRHP: June 24, 1976

Cow Marsh Old School Baptist Church, also known as Mount Moriah Baptist Church, is a historic Baptist church near Sandtown, Kent County, Delaware. It was built in 1872, and is a simple one-story, rectangular frame building. It is sheathed in clapboard, has a low gable roof, and features corner pilasters.

It was added to the National Register of Historic Places in 1976.
