= Sandtown, Delaware =

Unincorporated community in Delaware, United States

- Unincorporated community
- Location within Delaware Location within the United States
- Coordinates: 39°2′0″N 75°43′8″W
- Country: United States
- State: Delaware
- County: Kent
- Elevation: 59 ft (18 m)
- Time zone: UTC-5 (Eastern (EST))
  - Summer (DST): UTC-4 (EDT)
- Area code: 302
- GNIS feature ID: 216203

Sandtown is an unincorporated community in Kent County, Delaware, United States. Sandtown is located on Delaware Route 10, just east of the Maryland border.

The Cow Marsh Old School Baptist Church, Dill Farm Site, and White-Warren Tenant House are listed on the National Register of Historic Places.
