= White-Warren Tenant House =

Historic house in Delaware, US

- White–Warren tenant house
- U.S. National Register of Historic Places
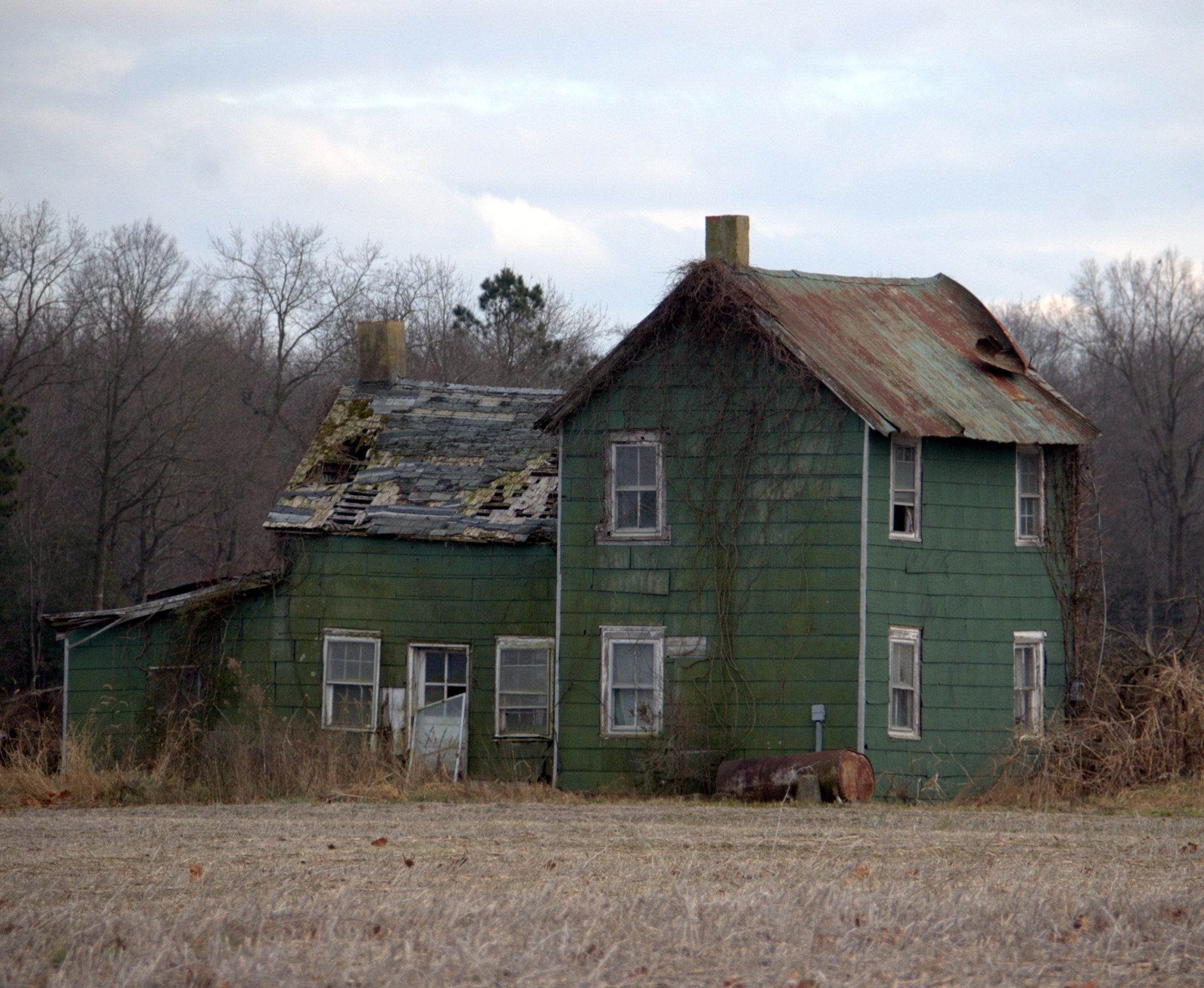

- Location within Delaware Location within the United States
- Location: Northeastern side of Road 261, Sandtown, Delaware
- Coordinates: 39°0′56″N 75°40′15″W
- Area: 1 acre (0.40 ha)
- MPS: House and Garden in Central Delaware MPS
- NRHP reference No.: 01001009
- Added to NRHP: September 21, 2001

The White–Warren tenant house is a historic home located at Sandtown, Delaware, United States. It was most likely built in the 1860s or 1870s as a 1 1/2-story, three-bay one-room plan "house and garden" dwelling. The second floor is linked by a narrow winder stair. It was expanded in the early 20th century with an addition to the gable end and a one-room, one-story, shed-roofed kitchen addition. The house was moved to its current location around 1930. It was occupied by farm laborers working on the White–Warren farm.

It was listed on the National Register of Historic Places in 2001.
