= Dill Farm Site =

Archaeological site in Delaware, United States

- U.S. National Register of Historic Places
- Nearest city: Sandtown, Delaware
- Area: 55 acres (22 ha)
- NRHP reference No.: 78000893
- Added to NRHP: October 2, 1978

The Dill Farm Site (7K-E-12) is a prehistoric archaeological site in Kent County, Delaware, near the town of Sandtown. The site located in a formerly swampy area, has yielded dates (some by radiocarbon dating, others by pollen analysis) of 500 BC and 8000 BC. Carey Complex ceramics (dating to c. 600 AD) have also been found at the 55-acre (22 ha) site.

The site was listed on the National Register of Historic Places in 1978.

== See also ==
- National Register of Historic Places listings in Kent County, Delaware
