= M. Evelyn Killen =

American temperance advocate

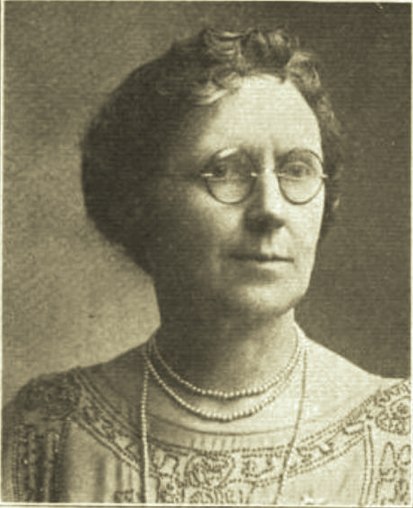
- Born: Mary Evelyn Meredith; September 10, 1871; Petersburg, Delaware, U.S.
- Died: February 4, 1951; Felton, Delaware, U.S.
- Occupation: temperance movement advocate
- Known for: President, Delaware State Woman's Christian Temperance Union
- Spouse: John Walson Killen (m. 1893; died 1928)

M. Evelyn Killen (née Meredith; 1871–1951) was an American temperance movement advocate who served as President of the Delaware State Woman's Christian Temperance Union (WCTU).

== Early life and education ==
Mary Evelyn Meredith was born on a farm near Petersburg, Delaware, September 10, 1871. Her parents were Peter Knotts Meredith (1833–1909) and Susannah (Broadway) Meredith (1839–1905). Mary's siblings were Leora and William.

She was educated in the local district school, at Felton, Delaware high school and seminary, and at Swarthmore College (for two years).

Early in life, Killen had begun to take an interest in the temperance cause, joining the local Band of Hope.

== Career ==
After her marriage in 1893, Killen entered actively into the work of the WCTU of Felton, and served that organization in various official positions. In 1908, she was made president of the city Union, an office which she held for eight years; and from 1916, she was recording secretary. In 1911, she became recording secretary of the Kent County, Delaware Union and held that position for eleven years, after which she served as vice-president for one year and as president for two years, resigning in May, 1925. In 1923, she was elected vice-president of the Delaware State WCTU, and after a year's service, she succeeded to the presidency, which office she continued to hold at least until 1928. She was also general secretary of the Felton Young People's Branch of the WCTU. In 1931, she was the director of motion pictures for the Delaware WCTU. Even in later years, she remained active in Delaware State Union work, being referred to as Honorary president.

== Personal life ==
In 1893, she married John Walson Killen (1857–1928), a farmer and nurseryman, of Felton. Their children were, Rachel, Ambrose, and William.

Evelyn Killen died in Felton, on February 4, 1951.
