= Willow Grove, Delaware =

Unincorporated community in Delaware, United States

- Unincorporated community
- Location within Delaware Location within the United States
- Coordinates: 39°4′15″N 75°37′42″W
- Country: United States
- State: Delaware
- County: Kent
- Elevation: 56 ft (17 m)
- Time zone: UTC-5 (Eastern (EST))
  - Summer (DST): UTC-4 (EDT)
- Area code: 302
- GNIS feature ID: 214858

Willow Grove is an unincorporated community in Kent County, Delaware, United States. Willow Grove is located on Delaware Route 10, southwest of Camden.
