= Delaware Route 10 =

State highway in Kent County, Delaware, United States

Delaware Route 10

Route information
- Maintained by DelDOT
- Length: 16.12 mi (25.94 km)
- Existed: 1936–present
- Tourist routes: Harriet Tubman Underground Railroad Byway

Major junctions
- West end: MD 287 in Sandtown
- DE 10 Alt. near Willow Grove; DE 15 near Camden; US 13 Alt. in Camden; US 13 in Camden; DE 10 Alt. in Highland Acres
- East end: DE 1 at Dover AFB

Location
- Country: United States
- State: Delaware
- Counties: Kent

Highway system
- Delaware State Route System; List; Byways
| ← DE 9A | → DE 11 |

Delaware Route 10 (DE 10) is a state highway in Kent County, Delaware. It runs from Maryland Route 287 (MD 287) at the Maryland border in Sandtown east to an interchange with the DE 1 freeway at the North Gate of Dover Air Force Base in the southeastern part of the city of Dover. The route passes through the towns of Camden and Wyoming along the way. From the Maryland border to Camden, it is a two-lane undivided road that passes through rural areas. DE 10 is a four-lane divided highway called Lebanon Road between U.S. Route 13 (US 13) in Camden and DE 1. DE 10 has one alternate route, DE 10 Alternate (DE 10 Alt.), which runs between Willow Grove and Highland Acres along an alignment further to the south, passing through Woodside and Rising Sun.

What is now DE 10 between the Maryland border and Camden was constructed as a state highway in stages in the 1920s and early 1930s. The route was first designated by 1936 to follow its current alignment between the Maryland border and Camden and current Rising Sun Road to US 113 Alt. in Rising Sun. By 1969, DE 10 was rerouted to follow Lebanon Road, a road completed by 1966, to US 113 (now DE 1) at Dover Air Force Base. Lebanon Road was improved into a divided highway by 1981.

== Route description ==
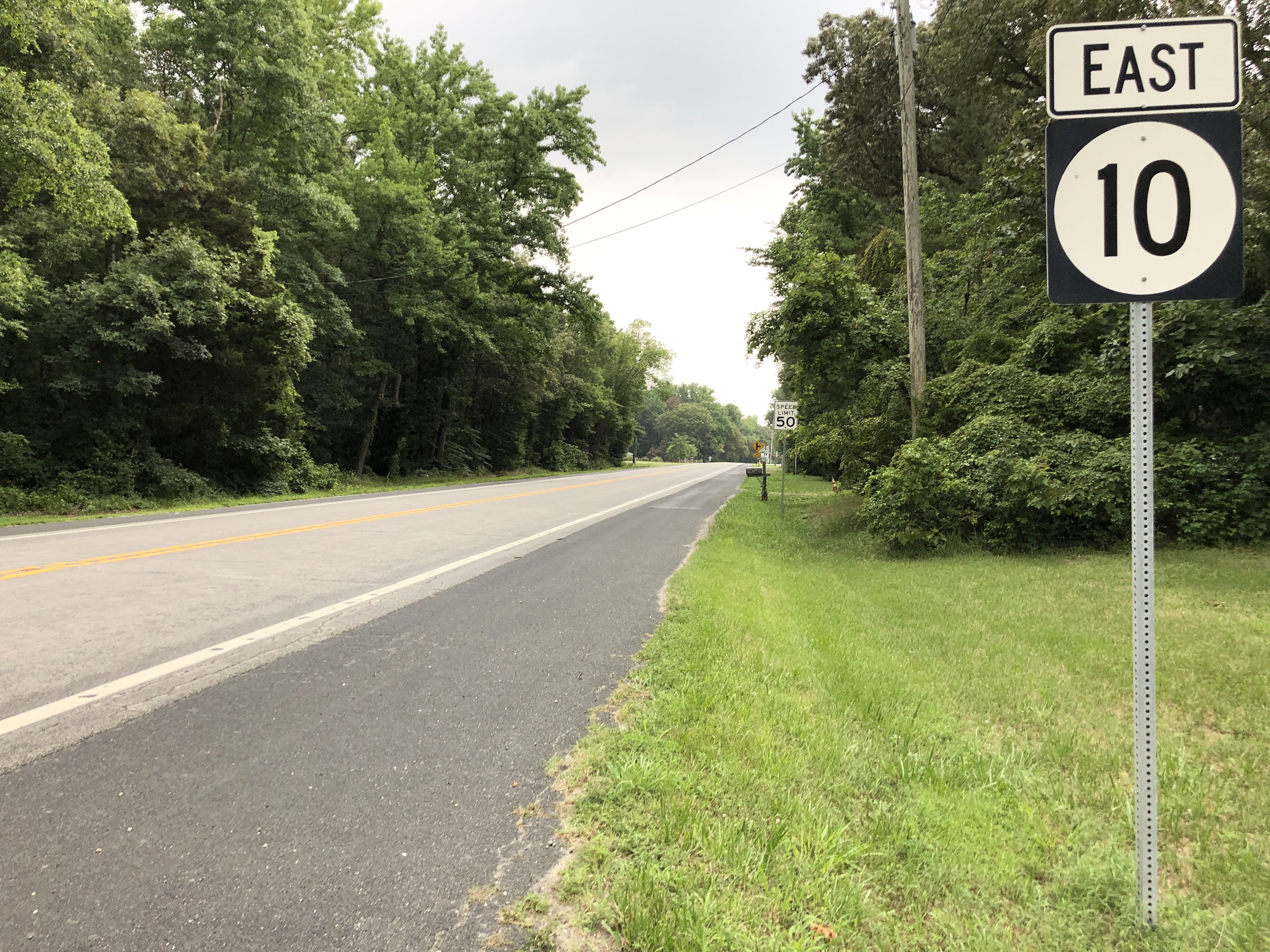
DE 10 eastbound past western terminus at MD 287 at the Maryland border in Sandtown

DE 10 begins at the Maryland border west of the community of Sandtown, where the road continues west into that state as MD 287. From the state line, the route heads east on two-lane undivided Willow Grove Road through a mix of farmland and woodland with some homes. DE 10 passes through Sandtown, where it intersects Sandtown Road. The road curves northeast and runs through the community of Petersburg before coming to an intersection with the western terminus of DE 10 Alt. DE 10 passes to the southeast of the community of Willow Grove and continues northeast. The route heads through rural areas with increasing residential development and intersects DE 15 at a roundabout, where the route briefly becomes a divided highway, before crossing the Delmarva Central Railroad's Delmarva Subdivision line at-grade.

The road continues northeast into the town of Camden and passes homes along with some businesses, becoming Caesar Rodney Avenue at the South Street intersection. DE 10 forms the border between the town of Wyoming to the west and Camden to the east and curves north before turning east onto Camden Wyoming Avenue and fully entering Camden. The route continues through residential areas, passing north of the Camden Friends Meetinghouse and crossing US 13 Alt. in the center of town. On the eastern edge of Camden, the road turns into a divided highway and comes to an intersection with US 13.

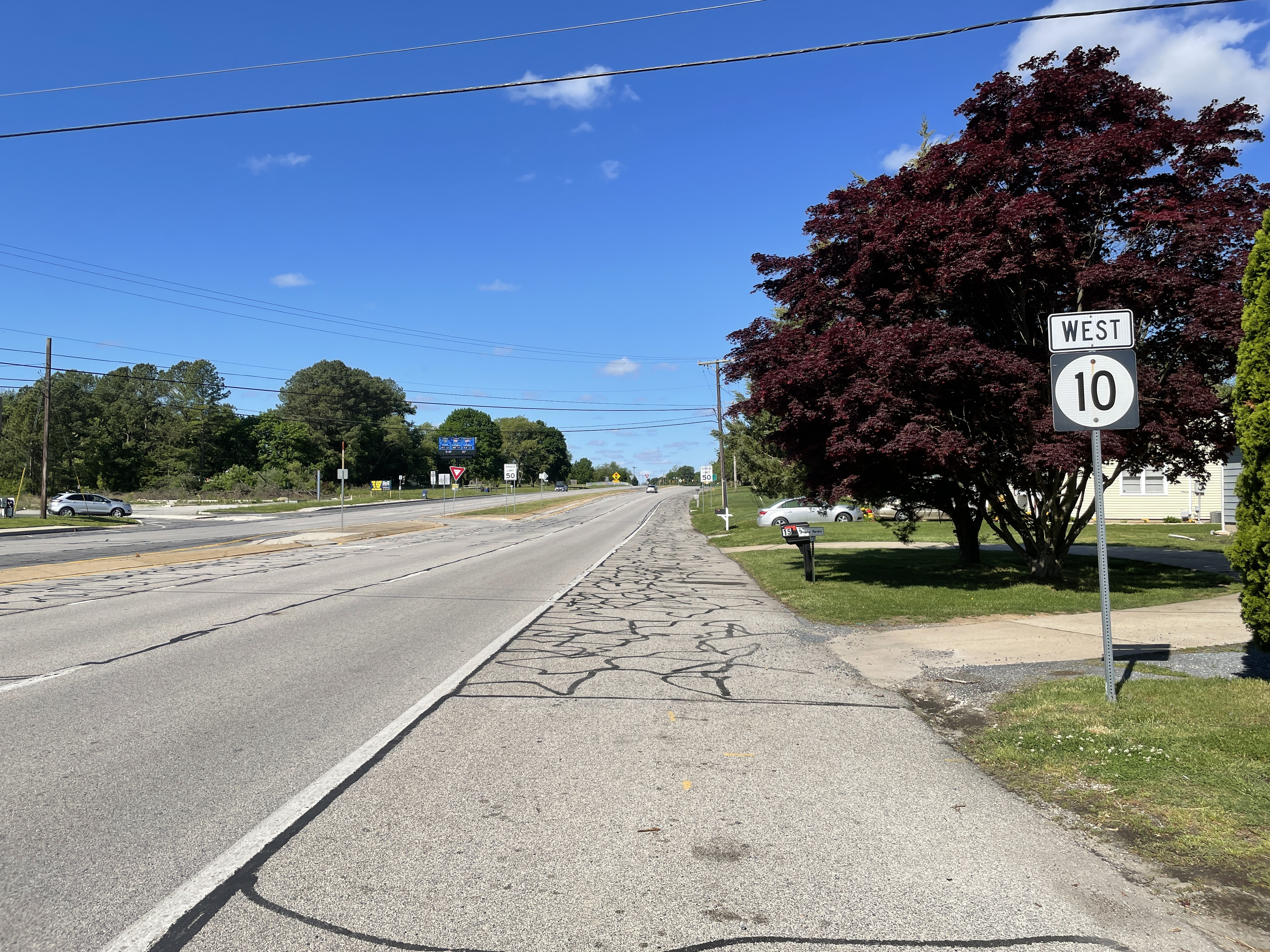
DE 10 westbound past DE 10 Alt. in Highland Acres

Past the intersection with US 13, DE 10 becomes West Lebanon Road, a four-lane divided highway, and intersects Rising Sun Road, which leads southeast to the community of Rising Sun. The road heads east-northeast and passes through areas of suburban residential development to the south of the city of Dover in Highland Acres. The route comes to an intersection with South State Street, where DE 10 Alt. returns to the route. DE 10 becomes East Lebanon Road and runs east through a mix of residential and commercial development. The route intersects Sorghum Mill Road, which leads south to the community of Lebanon, and curves to the northeast. The road crosses the St. Jones River in marshland and continues into a business area, reaching an interchange with access to and from the southbound direction the DE 1 freeway. DE 10 comes to its eastern terminus within this interchange at an intersection with Bay Road at the North Gate of Dover Air Force Base. Bay Road heads north to provide access to and from the northbound direction of DE 1.

The portion of the route between the Maryland border and US 13 Alt. in Camden and between DE 10 Alt. and Gateway South Boulevard near Lebanon is part of the Harriet Tubman Underground Railroad Byway, a Delaware Byway. DE 10 has an annual average daily traffic count ranging from a high of 23,644 vehicles at the eastern terminus at Bay Road to a low of 2,774 vehicles at the Sandtown Road intersection.

== History ==
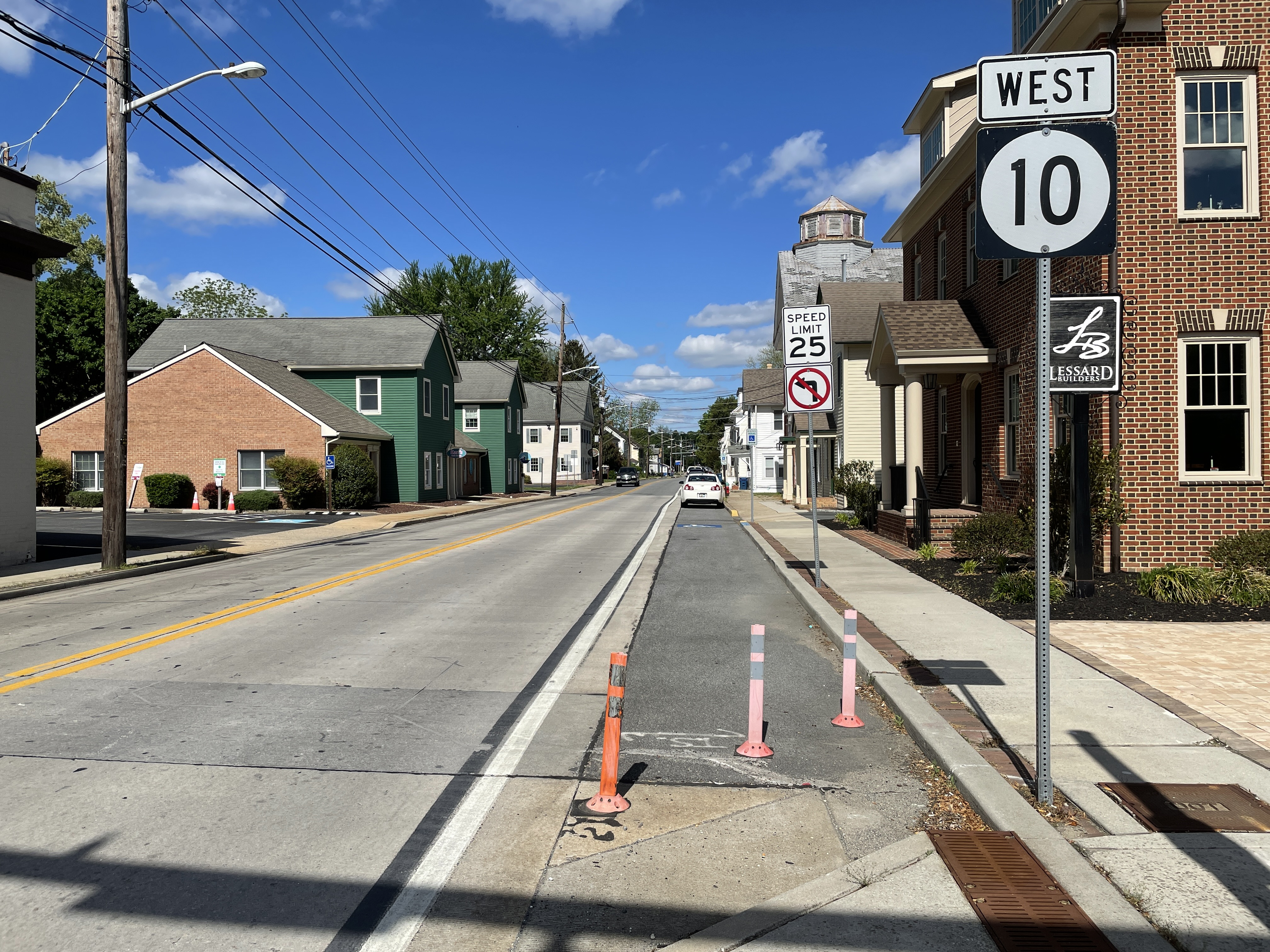
DE 10 westbound past US 13 Alt. in Camden

By 1920 what is now DE 10 existed as an unimproved county road. The portion of the current route through Camden, as well as the road between Camden and Rising Sun, was upgraded to a state highway by 1924. By 1925 the road was completed as a state highway between Willow Grove and Camden, while the portion between the Maryland border near Sandtown and Willow Grove was under proposal as a state highway. The portion of road west of Willow Grove became a state highway by 1931. DE 10 was assigned to run from the Maryland border near Sandtown to US 113 Alt. (South State Street) in Rising Sun by 1936, following its current alignment between the Maryland border and Camden and Rising Sun Road between Camden and Rising Sun. By 1964, the route was realigned to bypass Willow Grove to the southeast, with the former alignment now Willow Tree Circle. The Lebanon Road portion of DE 10 was constructed by 1966, connecting the route east of Camden to US 113 (Bay Road) at Dover Air Force Base. DE 10 was rerouted to follow Lebanon Road to US 113 by 1969.

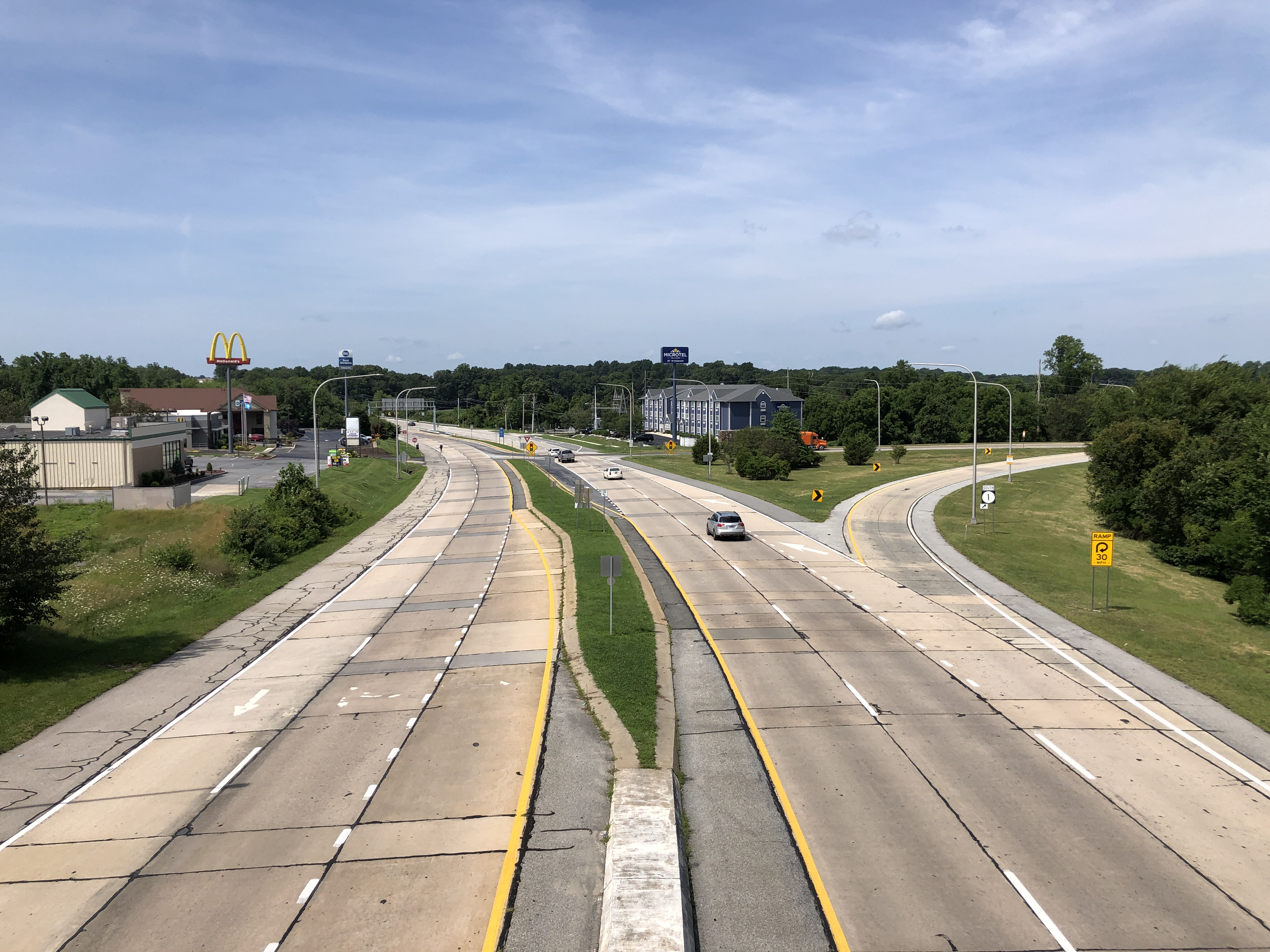
DE 10 westbound at DE 1 past the entrance to Dover Air Force Base

The Lebanon Road portion of the route between US 13 and US 113 was completely widened into a divided highway by 1981. In 1993, the DE 1 freeway was completed in the area of the eastern terminus, with an interchange to that road built that incorporated ramps to both DE 10 and the existing US 113, which merged with DE 1 at this point. The US 113 designation was removed from the area in 2004, leaving DE 10 terminating only with DE 1. On June 5, 2017, construction began for a roundabout at the junction with DE 15 west of Camden in order to improve safety at the intersection. The roundabout was completed by September 2017.

There are plans to build a bypass of the section of DE 10 through Camden in order to improve safety and reduce congestion on the alignment through the town. The bypass is proposed to run to the south of Camden, running from DE 10 at the western end of Camden east to a roundabout with DE 10 and Rising Sun Road east of the town. Construction of the bypass is planned to begin in 2024 and be completed in 2026. On July 10, 2024, a groundbreaking ceremony was held for the eastern portion of the bypass east of the US 13 intersection, with Delaware Department of Transportation secretary Nicole Majeski and state and local officials in attendance.

== Major intersections ==
The entire route is in Kent County.

| Location | mi | km | Destinations | Notes |
|---|---|---|---|---|
| Sandtown | 0.00 | 0.00 | MD 287 west (Sandtown Road) – Goldsboro | Maryland state line; western terminus |
| Willow Grove | | | DE 10 Alt. east (Henry Cowgill Road) – Woodside | Western terminus of DE 10 Alt. |
| Camden | 10.10 | 16.25 | DE 15 (Moose Lodge Road/Dundee Road) | Roundabout |
| Camden | 12.94 | 20.82 | US 13 Alt. (Main Street) | |
| Camden | 13.19 | 21.23 | US 13 (South Dupont Highway) – Dover, Harrington, Felton | |
| Highland Acres | 14.39 | 23.16 | DE 10 Alt. west (South State Street) – Rising Sun | Eastern terminus of DE 10 Alt. |
| Dover AFB | 16.19 | 26.06 | DE 1 to I-95 / Bay Road – Dover, Dover AFB Main Gate, Beaches | DE 1 exit 95; access to northbound DE 1 and from southbound DE 1 via Bay Road; eastern terminus |
| Dover AFB | 16.19 | 26.06 | Dover AFB North Gate | Continuation beyond DE 10 |
1.000 mi = 1.609 km; 1.000 km = 0.621 mi

== Delaware Route 10 Alternate ==
Delaware Route 10 Alternate
- Location: Willow Grove–Highland Acres
- Length: 9.23 mi (14.85 km)
- Existed: 1988–present
- Tourist routes: Harriet Tubman Underground Railroad Byway

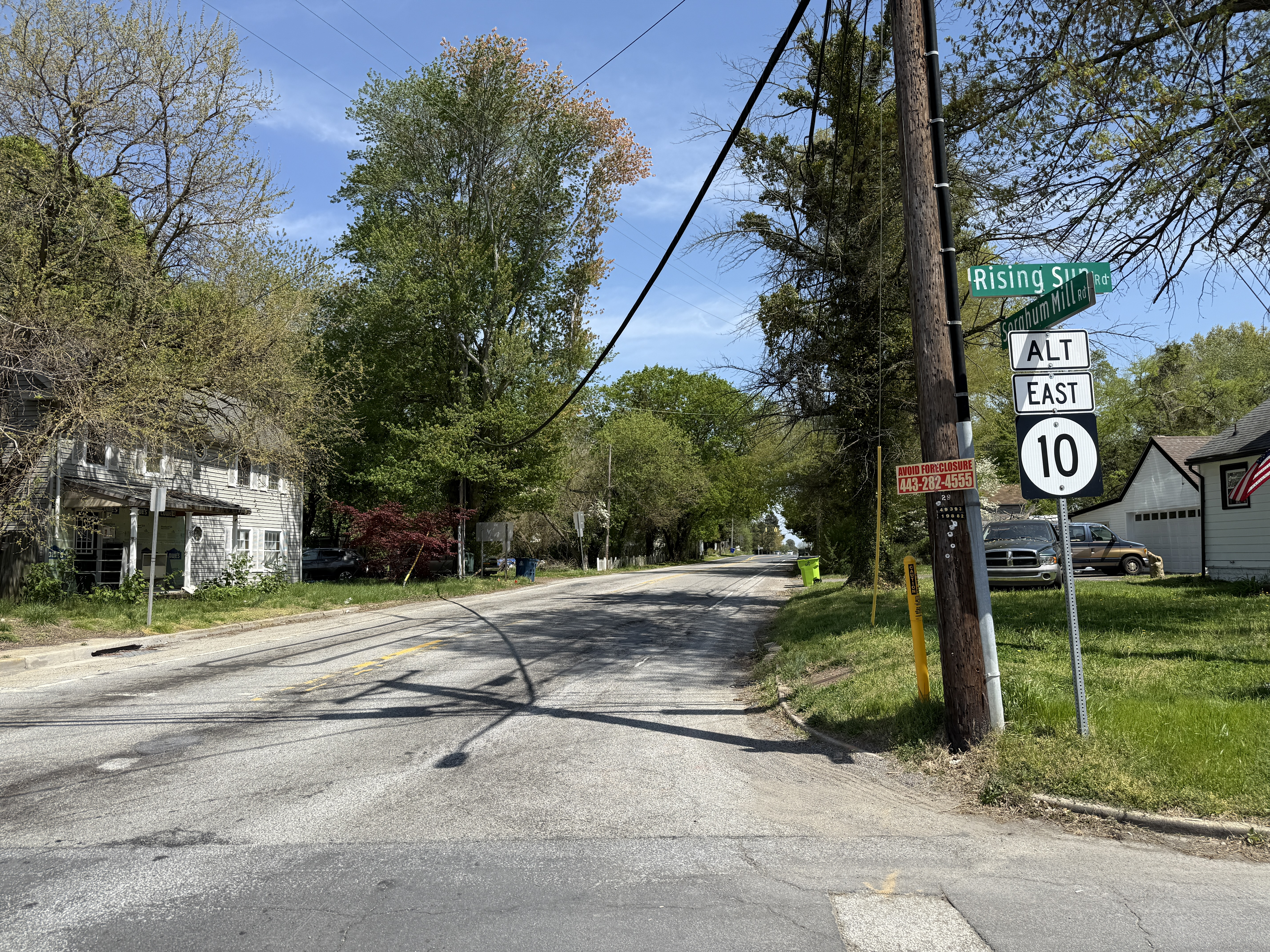
DE 10 Alt. eastbound in Rising Sun

Delaware Route 10 Alternate (DE 10 Alt.) is an alternate route of DE 10 between Willow Grove and Highland Acres. The route heads east from DE 10 on two-lane undivided Henry Cowgill Road, passing through a mix of farmland and woodland with some homes and crossing Tidbury Creek. DE 10 Alt. reaches the town of Woodside and intersects DE 15, with that route becoming concurrent with DE 10 Alt. on Main Street. The road crosses the Delmarva Central Railroad's Delmarva Subdivision line at-grade and becomes lined with homes. At an intersection with US 13 Alt., DE 15 splits from DE 10 Alt. by heading south of US 13 Alt. DE 10 Alt. becomes Walnut Shade Road and comes to an intersection with US 13 on the eastern edge of Woodside. Past this intersection the route passes to the south of Polytech High School and enters a mix of farms, woods, and residential development to the north of the community of Woodside East, curving to the northeast and reaching an intersection with Peachtree Run before heading north-northeast. DE 10 Alt. reaches the community of Rising Sun, turning northeast onto Sorghum Mill Road at the Voshells Mill Star Hill Road/Rising Sun Road intersection before making a turn to the north onto South State Street. The route passes through woods, crossing Tidbury Creek, and runs through residential development before ending at another intersection with DE 10, with South State Street continuing north toward Dover.

The portion of the route between Voshells Mill Star Hill Road/Rising Sun Road and South State Street/Sorghum Mill Road in Rising Sun is part of the Harriet Tubman Underground Railroad Byway, a Delaware Byway. DE 10 Alt. has an annual average daily traffic count ranging from a high of 11,746 vehicles at the eastern terminus at DE 10 to a low of 1,341 vehicles at the western border of Woodside.

The road was constructed as a state highway between Woodside and Rising Sun in 1931 and between Willow Grove and Woodside the following year. DE 10 Alt. was designated by 1988 onto its current alignment. Prior to 2004, the South State Street portion of DE 10 Alt. was concurrent with US 113 Alt., which was decommissioned when US 113 was truncated from Dover to Milford. There are plans to construct a roundabout at the intersection with Peachtree Run east of Woodside. Construction is planned to begin in the later part of 2024 and be completed in 2025.

Major intersections

The entire route is in Kent County.

| Location | mi | km | Destinations | Notes |
|---|---|---|---|---|
| Willow Grove | 0.00 | 0.00 | DE 10 (Willow Grove Road) – Petersburg, Sandtown, Willow Grove | Western terminus |
| Woodside | 3.66 | 5.89 | DE 15 north (Dundee Road) | West end of DE 15 overlap |
| Woodside | 4.17 | 6.71 | US 13 Alt. / DE 15 south (Upper King Road) – Camden, Canterbury | East end of DE 15 overlap |
| Woodside | 4.70 | 7.56 | US 13 (South Dupont Highway) – Camden, Dover, Felton | |
| Highland Acres | 9.23 | 14.85 | DE 10 (Lebanon Road) – Camden, Dover AFB | Eastern terminus |
1.000 mi = 1.609 km; 1.000 km = 0.621 mi: Concurrency terminus
