= List of places referred to as the Center of the Universe =

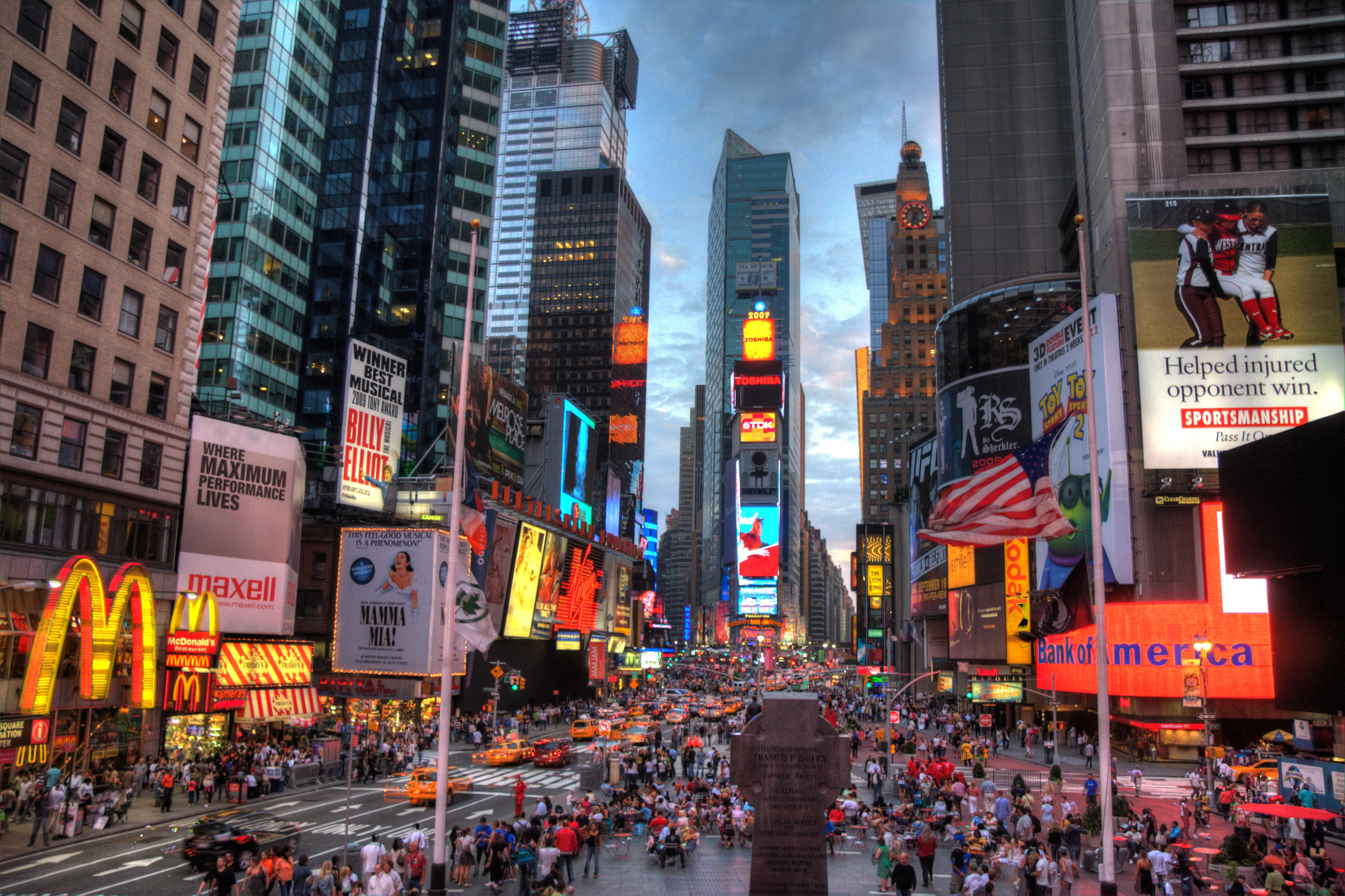
New York City, Manhattan, and Times Square are commonly referred to as "The Center of the Universe".

Several places have been given the nickname "Center (or Centre) of the Universe". In addition, several fictional works have described a depicted location as being at the Center of the Universe.

Modern models of the Universe suggest it does not have a center, unlike previous systems which placed Earth (geocentrism) or the Sun (heliocentrism) at the Center of the Universe.

== Nicknames of places ==
=== Astronomy ===
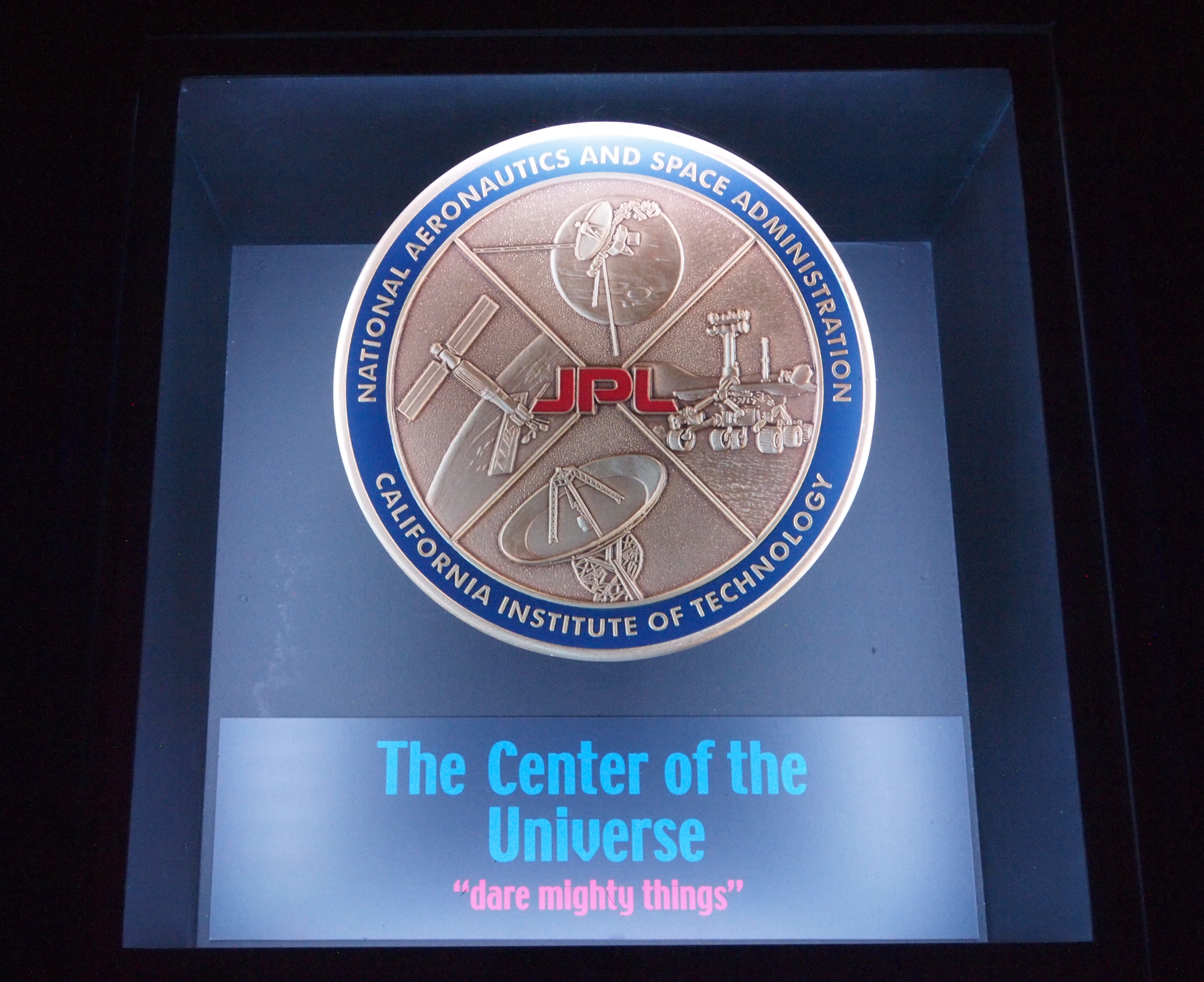
Plaque on the floor of the Space Flight Operations Facility of the NASA Deep Space Network proclaiming the site to be "The Center of the Universe"

- Centre of the Universe, the former interpretive centre at the Dominion Astrophysical Observatory in Saanich, British Columbia, Canada
- Naro Space Center, the only spaceport in South Korea
- (United States) Space Flight Operations Facility, the operations control center of the NASA Deep Space Network at the Jet Propulsion Laboratory in Pasadena, California
- Tanegashima Space Center, the main spaceport of Japan

=== Geography ===
==== Asia ====
===== China =====
- Wudaokou, Beijing
- Cao County, Heze, Shandong Province

==== Europe ====
===== Belgium =====
- Zulte – Local artist Roger Raveel claimed Zulte as the center of the universe by placing a sculpture in the garden of the Roger Raveel Museum titled this is now at this moment for you the center of the universe.

===== Finland =====
- Kuopio Market Square – nicknamed as Mualiman napa by the people of Kuopio, literally meaning the "Center of the Universe".

===== France =====
- Perpignan – Salvador Dalí considered its train station as the Center of the Universe.

==== Greece ====
- Omphalos of Delphi - an "omphalos", religious stone, regarded by the Ancient Greeks to be the center or "navel" of the cosmos, coming from a myth related to Zeus

===== Slovakia =====
- Monument, educational trail and geographical point referred to as "Center of the World and the Universe", created by local artists near Vrbové town.

===== United Kingdom =====
- Hammersmith – local historian Keith Whitehouse claimed it as the Centre of the Universe due to its history of radical politics and invention.
- Huddersfield – as mentioned in the Iron Maiden B-Side 'The Sheriff of Huddersfield'
- Kirmington – home of Guy Martin referred to as ‘Center of T’ Universe’.
- Wolverhampton – Sir Terry Wogan referred to Wolverhampton as the Centre of the Universe because there, the bathwater goes straight down the plughole.

==== North America ====
===== Canada =====
- A site near Kamloops, British Columbia has been referred to as a spiritual "Centre of the Universe".
- Toronto, Ontario – a term used derisively by residents of the rest of Canada in reference to the city. See also: nicknames for Toronto.

===== Mexico =====
- Teotihuacan in modern-day Mexico – considered the Center of the Universe by many Mesoamerican tribes, including the Aztecs, and was a model city for the later indigenous civilizations. It was called the "birthplace of the gods" and heavily influenced the region despite being abandoned for centuries.

===== United States =====
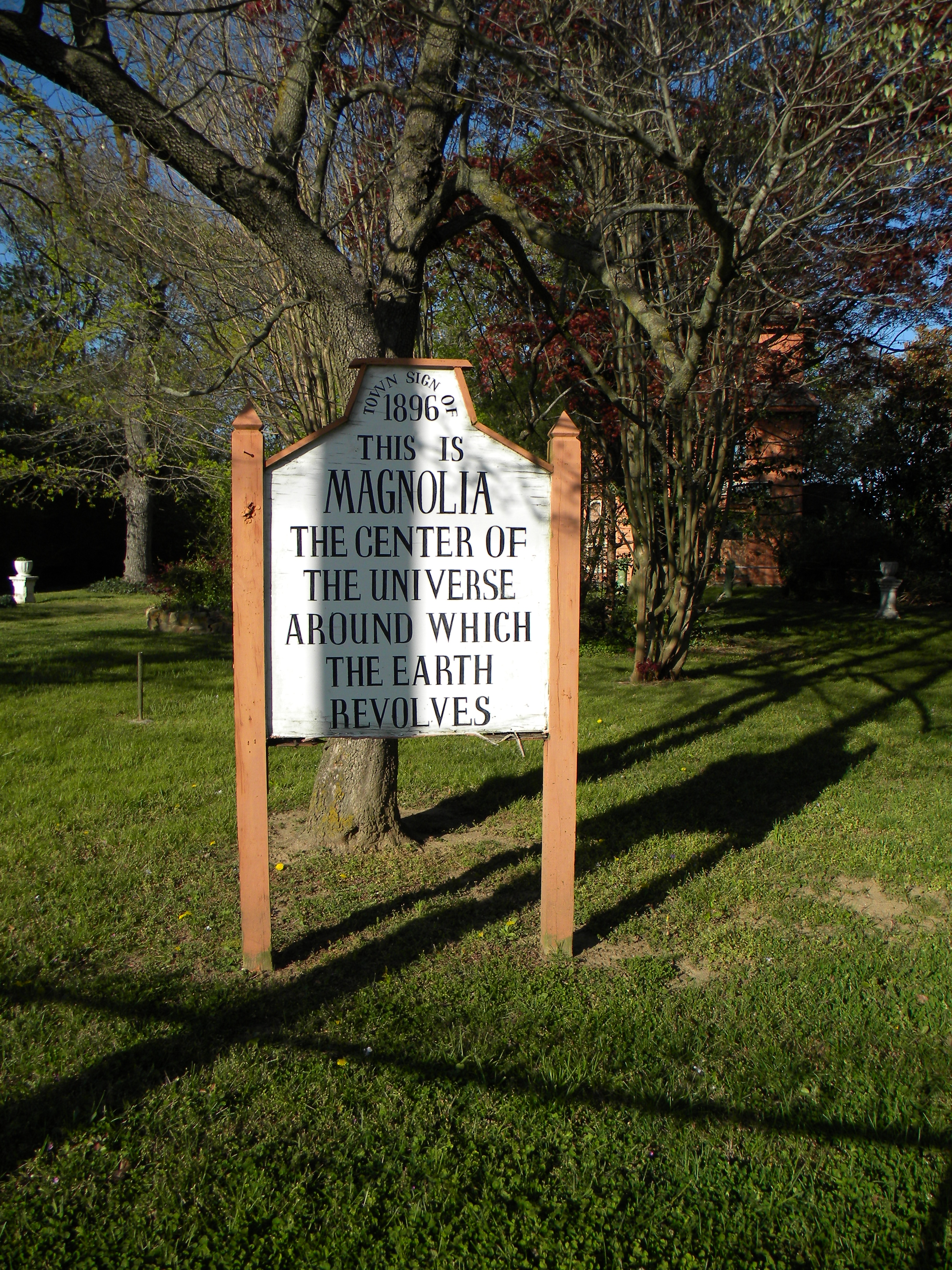
Sign outside of the John B. Lindale House proclaiming Magnolia, Delaware as "The Center of the Universe around which the Earth revolves"

- A concrete circle at the apex of a rebuilt span of the old Boston Avenue viaduct, between 1st and Archer Streets, in Tulsa, Oklahoma is known as "The Center of the Universe". The spot produces an acoustical anomaly and it is for which the Center of the Universe Festival and Ms. Center of the Universe Pageant are named.
- Albuquerque, New Mexico – a large sculpted-hallway structure with short corridors aligned to north-south, east-west, and up-down, at the main campus of the University of New Mexico is known as "The Center of the Universe".
- Alumni Hall (University of Notre Dame), South Bend, Indiana
- Ashland, Virginia – the actual, cosmological Center of the Universe, as declared by former Mayor Dick Gillis.
- César Chávez Park, Berkeley, California – more specifically, the sundial at the center of the park, located in the middle of the Bay Area.
- Epping, New Hampshire – bumper stickers sold at town hall state "Epping is the Center of the Universe"
- Fremont, Seattle, Washington – a neighborhood in Seattle is the “official” Center of the Universe: sign at the Center of the Universe.
- John B. Lindale House in Magnolia, Delaware – displays a sign proclaiming "This is Magnolia, the Center of the Universe around which the Earth revolves".
- New York City
  - Manhattan – often referred to as the Center of the Universe.
  - Times Square
- Otter Creek, Maine – A bench with "Otter Creek, Maine – Capital of the World and Center of the Universe" across back seat of a bench in village. The slogan appears on patches, hats and printed material. Patches and books of stories sold at the village market.
- Palm Court, New College of Florida in Sarasota, Florida – enshrined the Center of the Universe in 1965.
- Philo, Illinois – The legend "Center of the Universe" is painted on the village water tower, along with its zipcode.
- The center of the Great Dome on the campus of the Massachusetts Institute of Technology.
- Wallace, Idaho – declared by a mayoral proclamation to be the Center of the Universe based on the theory of probabilism: if you cannot prove that Wallace is not the Center of the Universe, then it must be the Center of the Universe. This philosophy was penned by journalist, David Bond, claiming it as a "spoof" highlighting the EPA's "unfalsifiable science of probabilism" in the declaration of the Silver Valley as a super-fund site.
- Three Rivers, Michigan – declared by the Three Rivers City Commission mainly based on a number of stories collected by a local resident of people from Three Rivers finding other people in unexpected places with connections to the Three Rivers area while they travel.

==== Oceania ====
===== Australia =====
- Glen Waverley, Melbourne, Victoria – nicknamed "The Centre of the Universe" (Chinese: "宇宙中心") by the local Chinese residents due to its convenient location, ample amenities, good weather, and favourable living conditions.

== Fiction ==
Depictions of a "Center of the Universe" in fiction include:

- Any place other than The Restaurant at the End of the Universe in The Hitchhiker's Guide to the Galaxy series.
- Azathoth, "The Blind Idiot God", in H.P. Lovecraft's Cthulhu Mythos.
- Eternia, the planet that is home to the Masters of the Universe.
- In the game Ratchet & Clank Future: A Crack in Time for the PS3, The Great Clock was said to be constructed at the exact Center of the Universe (give or take fifty feet).
- In the game Super Mario Galaxy for the Wii, Mario travels to the final area, named the Center of the Universe.
- Nibbler's home planet Eternium, in Futurama.
- Oa, a planet at the center of the DC Comics Universe.
- San Dimas, California in Bill & Ted's Excellent Adventure.
- Terminus, in the Doctor Who serial Terminus.

== See also ==
- Center of the universe (disambiguation)
- List of cities nicknamed Hub of the Universe
- Earth's inner core
- Galactic Center
- Geographical centre of Earth
- Great Attractor
- History of the center of the Universe
- Sun – the center of the Solar System
