= Omphalos (disambiguation) =

An omphalos is a type of ancient religious stone artifact.

Omphalos may also refer to:

- 7 Splinters in Time (working title Omphalos), a 2018 American independent science fiction film produced by Red Giant Media
- Omfalos, a concrete and rock sculpture attributed to the Swedish artist Lars Vilks
- Omphalos (book), by Philip Gosse, written in 1857
- "Omphalos" (story), a science fantasy short story by American author Ted Chiang
- Omphalos hypothesis, an attempt to reconcile scientific evidence with a literal interpretation of the Christian bible
