= Cotu =

Cotu, CotU, COTU, may refer to:

== Places in Romania ==
Cotu may refer to several villages in Romania:

- Cotu, a village in Cuca Commune, Argeș County
- Cotu, a village in Uda Commune, Argeș County
- Cotu, a village in Copălău Commune, Botoşani County
- Cotu, a village in Breasta Commune, Dolj County
- Cotu Băii, a village in Fântâna Mare Commune, Suceava County
- Cotu Ciorii, a village in C. A. Rosetti Commune, Buzău County
- Cotu Dobei, a village in Fântânele Commune, Suceava County
- Cotu Grosului, a village in Filipești Commune, Bacău County
- Cotu lui Ivan, a village in Golăiești Commune, Iași County
- Cotu Lung and Cotu Mihalea, villages in Siliștea Commune, Brăila County
- Cotu Morii, a village in Popricani Commune, Iași County
- Cotu Malului, a village in Leordeni Commune, Argeș County
- Cotu Miculinţi, a village in Coțușca Commune, Botoşani County
- Cotu Văii, a village in Albești Commune, Constanța County
- Cotu Vameş, a village in Horia Commune, Neamț County

== Other uses ==
- DC Comics' Challengers of the Unknown
- Cities of the Underworld, a U.S. TV series
- UK RAF Coastal Operations Training Units; see List of Royal Air Force Operational Training Units
- Central Organization of Trade Unions, Kenya

== See also ==
- List of places referred to as the Center of the Universe (CotU)
- Cotus (disambiguation)
- Center of the universe (disambiguation) (CotU, COTU)
