= Cotus =

Cotus may refer to:

== Places ==
- Cotuș River, Transylvania, Romania; a tributary of the Mureș River
- Cotuș, Sângeorgiu de Mureș, Mureș County, Transylvania, Romania; a village

== People and characters ==
- Cotus (Aedui) (1st century BCE), a Romanized Celt, who lost the election to magistrate of the Haedui to Convictolitavis
- Cotus, a character from the Shakespeare play Coriolanus
- Cotus, a fictional character from the TV show The Tomorrow People; see List of The Tomorrow People serials

== Other uses ==
- United States Congress, the Congress of the United States (COTUS)
- United States Constitution, the Constitution of the United States (COTUS)

== See also ==
- Cotu (disambiguation), for the singular of Cotus
