= Magnolia, Delaware =

- Town
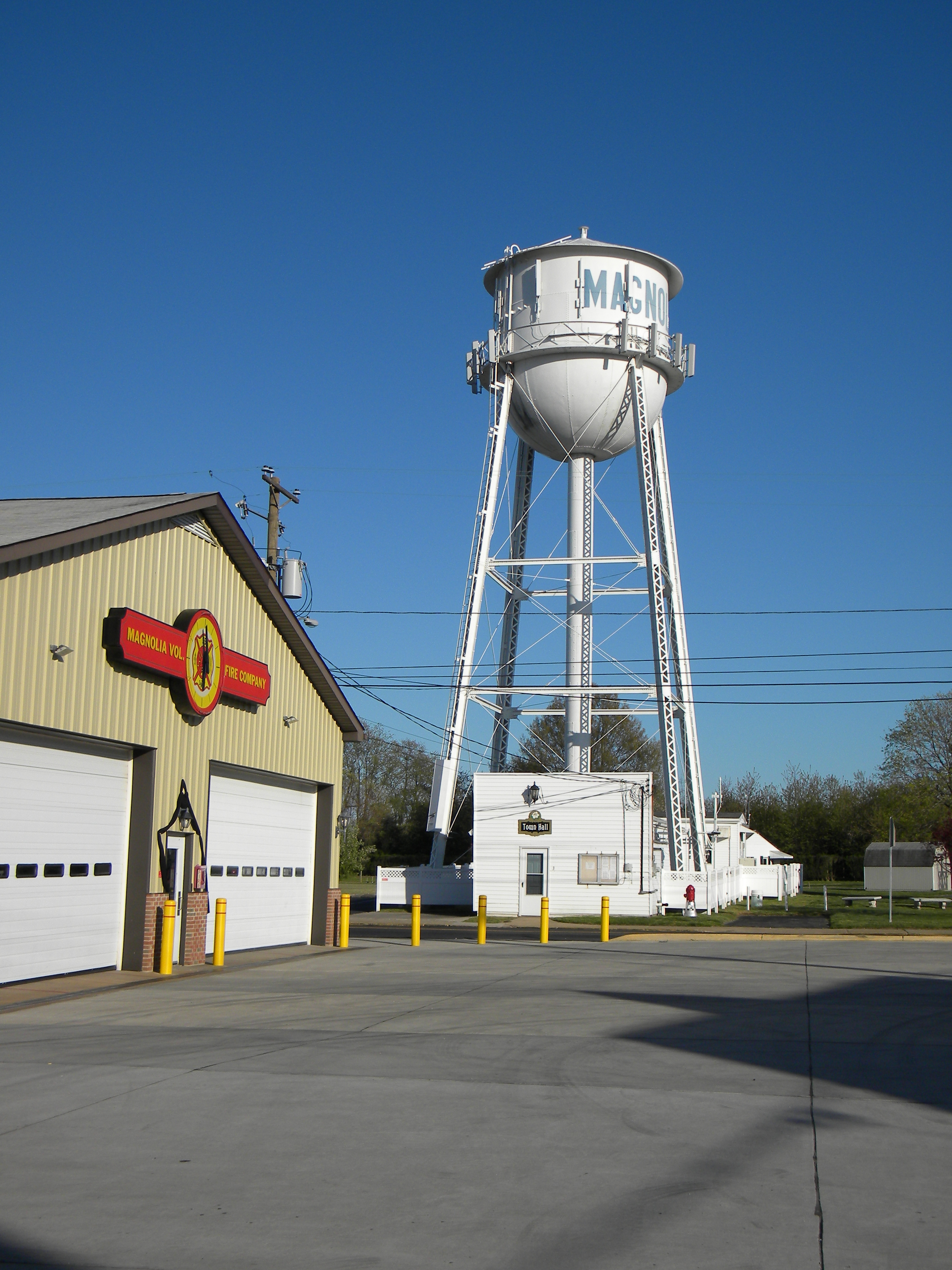
- Magnolia Fire Company, with Town Hall and water tower in background

- Location of Magnolia in Kent County, Delaware.

- Location within the state of Delaware Magnolia (the United States)
- Coordinates: 39°04′16″N 75°28′34″W
- Country: United States
- State: Delaware
- County: Kent

Area
  - Total: 0.20 sq mi (0.51 km^{2})
  - Land: 0.20 sq mi (0.51 km^{2})
  - Water: 0 sq mi (0.00 km^{2})
- Elevation: 26 ft (7.9 m)

Population (2020)
  - Total: 277
  - Density: 1,416/sq mi (546.6/km^{2})
- Time zone: UTC−5 (Eastern (EST))
  - Summer (DST): UTC−4 (EDT)
- ZIP code: 19962
- Area code: 302
- FIPS code: 10-44430
- GNIS feature ID: 214264
- Website: magnolia.delaware.gov

Magnolia is a town in Kent County, Delaware, United States. It is part of the Dover metro area. Recent estimates put the population at around 235, however, the population was 277 at the 2020 census.

== History ==
The area was known as Caroon Manor when it was first founded and the land had been given by the Duke of York. The town of Magnolia was incorporated in 1885 and was named for the Duke of York's favorite tree, the Magnolia. When it was incorporated, the founders chose for the town to have a circular boundary to represent brotherhood. The boundary was 1/4 mile (0.40 km) in diameter. The town of Magnolia retains its original boundaries as the town council has decided against annexation of land to change the boundaries.

The John B. Lindale House displays a sign claiming that Magnolia is "the Center of the Universe around which the Earth revolves". Along with the Matthew Lowber House, the Gov. George Truitt House, and three archaeological sites, it is listed on the National Register of Historic Places.

== Geography ==
Magnolia is located at 39°04′16″N 75°28′34″W (39.0712238, –75.4760327).

According to the United States Census Bureau, the town has a total area of 0.2 square miles (0.52 km^{2}), all land.

== Demographics ==
Historical population
Census	Pop.	Note	%±
1880	193		—
1890	216		11.9%
1900	208		−3.7%
1910	210		1.0%
1920	177		−15.7%
1930	173		−2.3%
1940	218		26.0%
1950	207		−5.0%
1960	310		49.8%
1970	319		2.9%
1980	283		−11.3%
1990	211		−25.4%
2000	226		7.1%
2010	225		−0.4%
2020	277		23.1%
U.S. Decennial Census

At the 2000 census there were 226 people in 86 households, including 57 families, in the town. The population density was 1,178.7 inhabitants per square mile (455.1/km^{2}). There were 96 housing units at an average density of 500.7 units per square mile (193.3 units/km^{2}). The racial makeup of the town was 85.40% White, 10.18% African American, 0.44% Native American, 0.44% Asian, 2.21% from other races, and 1.33% from two or more races. Hispanic or Latino of any race were 3.10%.

Of the 86 households 38.4% had children under the age of 18 living with them, 48.8% were married couples living together, 14.0% had a female householder with no husband present, and 32.6% were non-families. 22.1% of households were one person and 5.8% were one person aged 65 or older. The average household size was 2.63 and the average family size was 3.10.

The age distribution was 31.0% under the age of 18, 7.1% from 18 to 24, 32.3% from 25 to 44, 18.6% from 45 to 64, and 11.1% 65 or older. The median age was 31 years. For every 100 females, there were 115.2 males. For every 100 females age 18 and over, there were 100.0 males.

The median household income was $39,917 and the median family income was $45,000. Males had a median income of $36,250 versus $20,417 for females. The per capita income for the town was $17,001. About 10.8% of families and 11.0% of the population were below the poverty line, including 7.1% of those under the age of eighteen and 40.6% of those sixty five or over.

== Education ==
Magnolia is located in the Caesar Rodney School District.

J. Ralph McIlvane Early Childhood Center is in Magnolia. Portions are zoned to Allen Frear Elementary School in Rising Sun-Lebanon while others are zoned to Star Hill Elementary School, in an unincorporated area. Both areas in turn are zoned to Postlethwait Middle School, also in Rising Sun-Lebanon. Caesar Rodney High School in Camden is the comprehensive high school for the entire district.

== Infrastructure ==
=== Transportation ===
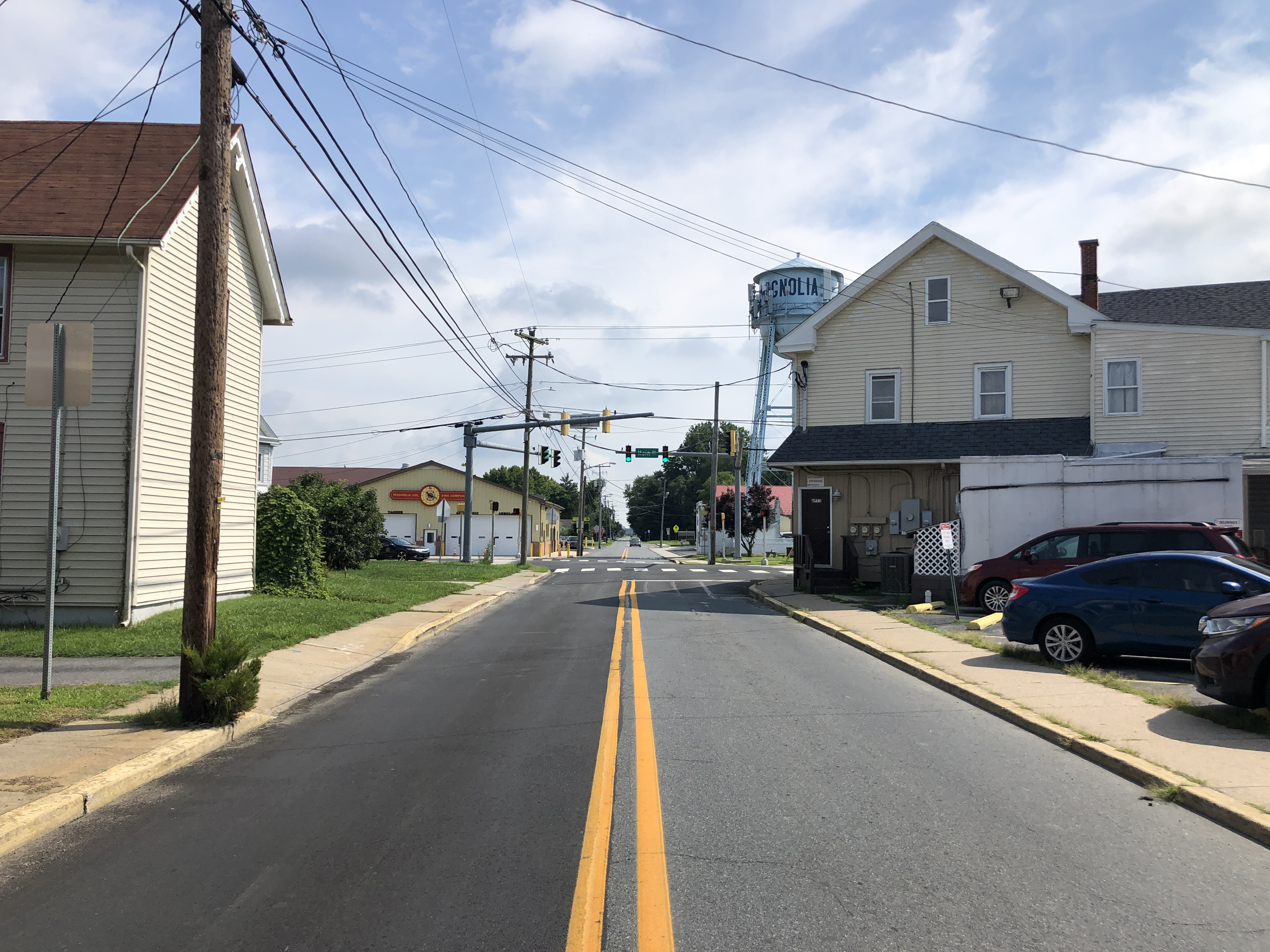
Walnut Street approaching Main Street in Magnolia

Main Street (former U.S. Route 113 Alt.) is the main north–south road through Magnolia, heading north as South State Street toward Dover and south as Clapham Road toward DE 1 in Little Heaven. Walnut Street is the main east–west road through Magnolia, heading west as Irish Hill Road toward Canterbury and east as Barkers Landing Road to an interchange with DE 1. DART First State provides bus service to Magnolia along Route 303, which runs north to Dover and south to Milford and Georgetown.

=== Utilities ===
Delmarva Power, a subsidiary of Exelon, provides electricity to Magnolia. Chesapeake Utilities provides natural gas to the town. The town's Water Department provides water to Magnolia.

== Notable person ==
- Duron Harmon (born 1991), American football safety
