= Omfalos =

Concrete and rock sculpture of Lars Vilks

Omfalos is a concrete and rock sculpture attributed to the Swedish artist Lars Vilks. It was forcefully removed from a natural reserve area where it had been unlawfully erected, and currently belongs to the collections of the Moderna Museet.

== The sculpture ==
The name, Omfalos, derives from the Greek ομφαλός (omphalos), meaning "center of the world". It refers to the ancient sculpture Omphalos found at Delphi, Greece.

The sculpture was erected in 1999 in the Kullaberg natural reserve in Skåne County, Sweden, and takes the form of a 1.6-meter-tall (5.2 ft) pillar. The local authorities deemed the construction of Omfalos to be in violation of the regulations governing the natural reserve, and initiated a legal process to have it destroyed or removed from the site. Lars Vilks denied being the creator of the work, but it was attributed to him over the course of the proceedings. In 2001, a crane barge transported the sculpture from the site, damaging it in the process. The then-current owner, the artist Ernst Billgren, donated it to Moderna Museet, a modern art museum in Stockholm, Sweden. Lars Vilks was granted the authorities' approval to erect an 8 cm memorial at the original site.

== Relation to other works ==
Lars Vilks had previously and without permission erected two other sculptures in the Kullaberg natural reserve - the Nimis and the Arx, made from driftwood and rock respectively, in 1980. When they were discovered in 1982, the local authorities decided that they were in violation of building code laws. Despite the authorities' efforts to have Nimis and Arx removed as well as several instances of vandalism and fire, repaired versions of both sculptures were still standing 40 years after their construction. Lars Vilks considers the sculptures and the controversy surrounding them to be works of conceptual art, with the legal proceedings comprising the most important part. The area, proclaimed by Vilks as the sovereign micronation of Ladonia, has become a tourist attraction with approximately 90,000 visitors annually.
