= Matthew Lowber House =

Historic house in Delaware, United States

- U.S. National Register of Historic Places
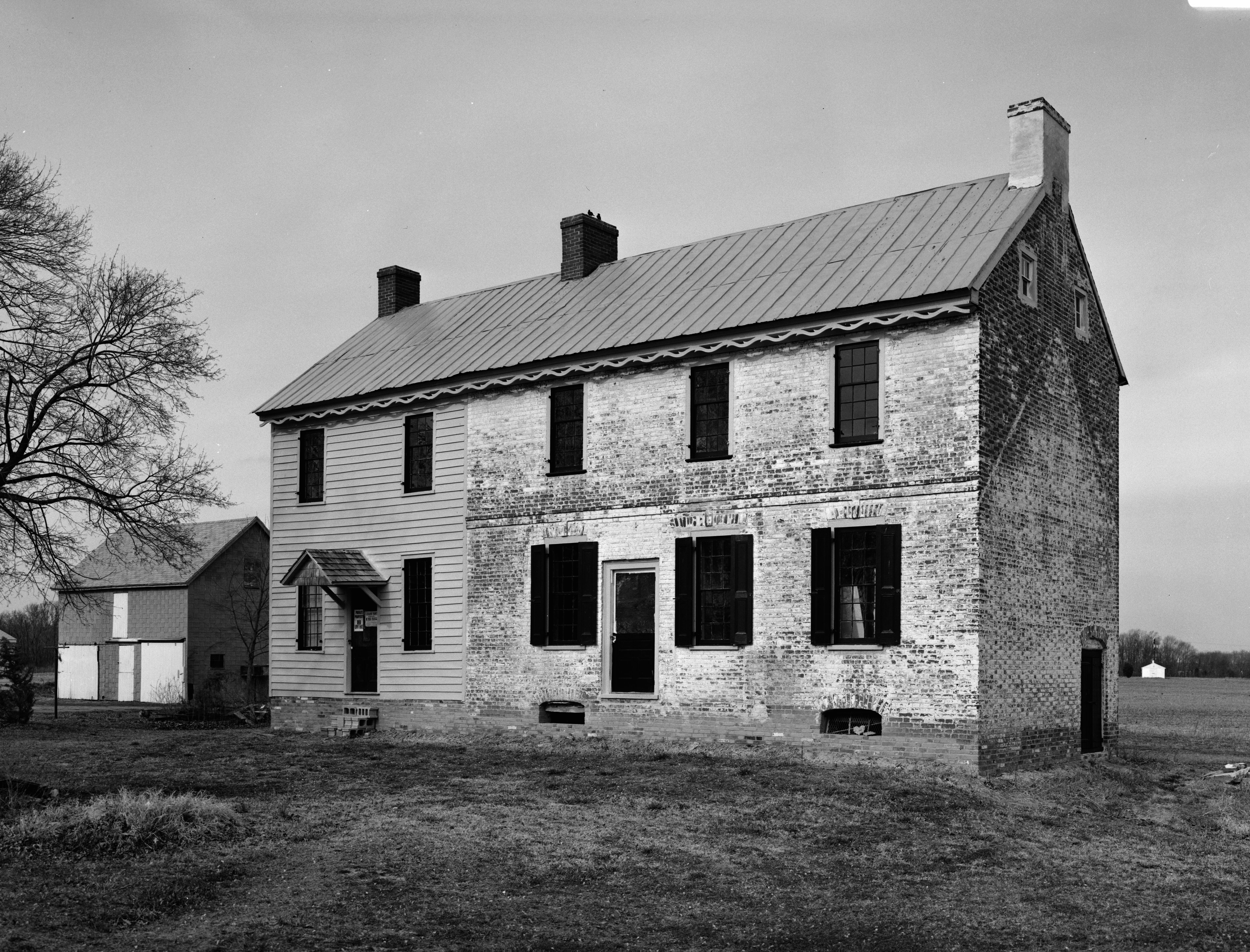
- Matthew Lowber House, HABS Photo, July 1982

- Location within Delaware Location within the United States
- Location: E of Main St., Magnolia, Delaware
- Coordinates: 39°4′21″N 75°28′50″W
- Area: 0.2 acres (0.081 ha)
- Built: 1774, c. 1855
- NRHP reference No.: 71000221
- Added to NRHP: April 16, 1971

Matthew Lowber House is a historic home located at Magnolia, Kent County, Delaware. It was built in 1774, and is a two-story, three-bay, brick dwelling, with a two-bay frame addition added about 1855. The interior has excellent panelling, the original wide floor boards, and a winding enclosed stairway. An addition was added to the back of the house in 2020.

It was listed on the National Register of Historic Places in 1973.
