= List of cities nicknamed Hub of the Universe =

The title Hub of the Universe is referenced by these North American cities:

- Marion, Illinois
  - "Marion is nicknamed 'The Hub of the Universe' because of its location at the crossroads of Illinois Route 13 and Interstate 57."
- Boston, Massachusetts
  - "Hub of the Universe: a term specially applied to Boston, Mass., and by extension to other cities"

== See also ==
- List of places referred to as the Center of the Universe
