= Center of the universe (disambiguation) =

Center of the universe is a concept that lacks a coherent definition in modern astronomy.

Center of the universe or Centre of the universe may also refer to:

== Music ==
- Center of the Universe (album), by Giant Sand, 1992
- Center of the Universe, a 2007 album by Admiral Twin
- "Center of the Universe" (song), by Axwell, 2013
- "Center of the Universe", a song by Built to Spill from the 1999 album Keep It Like a Secret
- "Centre of the Universe", a song by Kamelot from the 2003 album Epica
- "Center of the Universe", a song by the Eagles from the 2007 album Long Road Out of Eden

== Television ==
- Center of the Universe (TV series), an American sitcom 2004–05
- "Center of the Universe", the second episode of the drama series Tulsa King

== Places ==
- List of places referred to as the Center of the Universe

== See also ==
- Centered in the Universe, a fulldome presentation that premiered in 2006, at the Griffith Observatory in Los Angeles
- Axis mundi
- Earth's inner core
- Galactic Center
- Geographical centre of Earth
- Great Attractor
- Sun, the center of the Solar System
