= Center of the universe =

Historical concept in cosmology

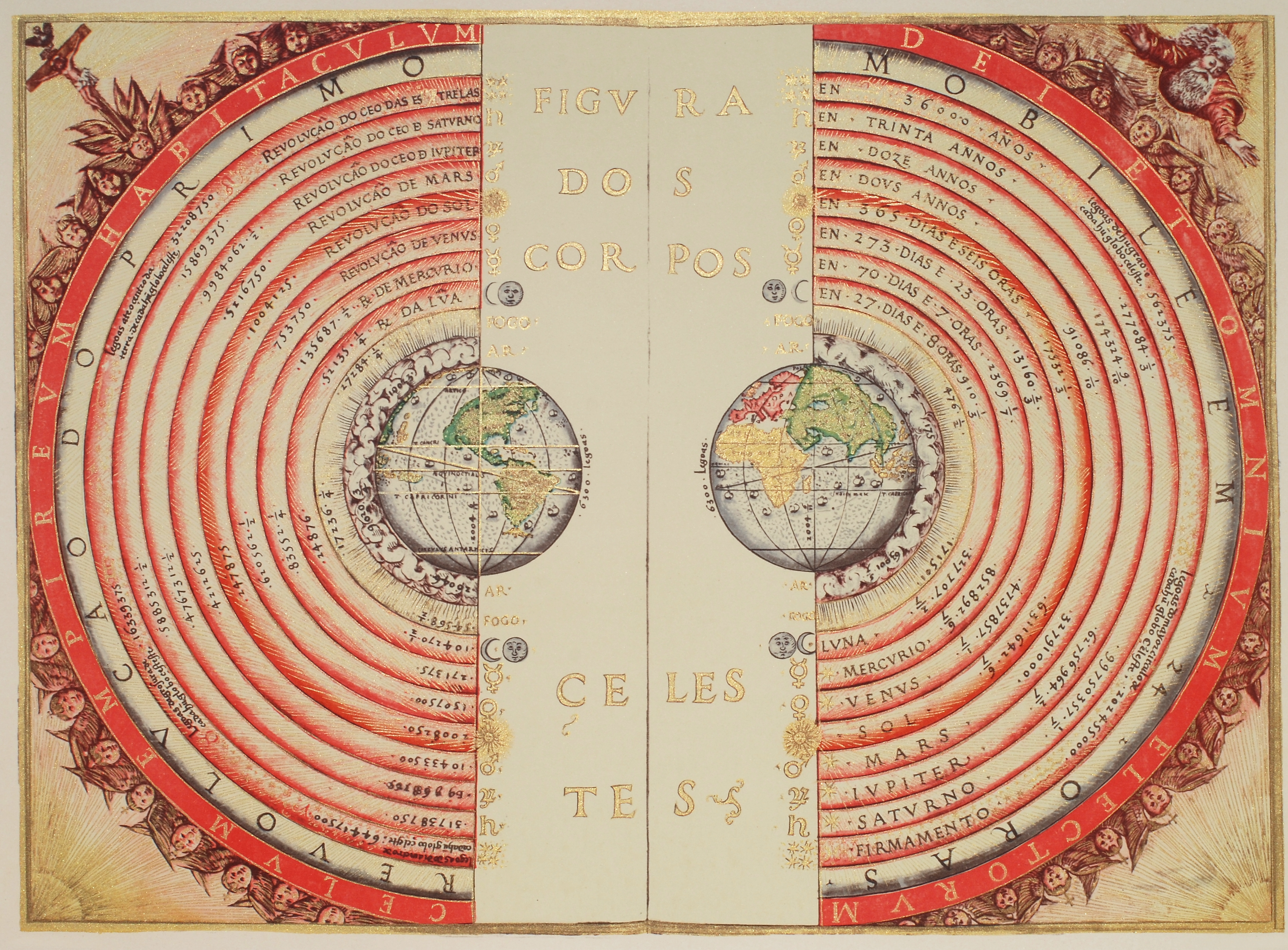
Figure of the heavenly bodies — an illustration of the Ptolemaic geocentric system by Portuguese cosmographer and cartographer Bartolomeu Velho, 1568 (Bibliothèque Nationale, Paris), depicting Earth as the centre of the Universe

The center of the universe is a concept in historical cosmological models prior to the 20th century. Modern cosmological theories are based on the Copernican principle that all locations are equivalent and the universe has no spatial center.

Historically, different people have suggested various locations as the center of the Universe. Many mythological cosmologies included an axis mundi, the central axis of a flat Earth that connects the Earth, heavens, and other realms together. In the 4th century BC Greece, philosophers developed the geocentric model, based on astronomical observation; this model proposed that the center of the Universe lies at the center of a spherical, stationary Earth, around which the Sun, Moon, planets, and stars rotate. With the development of the heliocentric model by Nicolaus Copernicus in the 16th century, the Sun was believed to be the center of the Universe, with the planets (including Earth) and stars orbiting it.

In the early-20th century, the discovery of other galaxies and the development of the Big Bang theory led to the development of cosmological models of a homogeneous, isotropic Universe which has no distinct spatial central point because, given that space expands from a shared central point in time (the Big Bang), the center of the universe is everywhere.

== Outside astronomy ==
Nature timeline
← / Earliest stars; ← / Earliest galaxy; ← / Earliest quasar / black hole; ← / Omega Centauri; ← / Andromeda Galaxy; ← / Milky Way spirals; ← / NGC 188 star cluster; ← / Alpha Centauri; ← / Accelerated expansion; ← / Earth / Solar System; ← / Earliest known life; ← / Atmospheric oxygen; ← / Sexual reproduction; ← / Earliest fungi; ← / Earliest land plants; ← / Cambrian explosion; ← / Earliest mammals; ← / Earliest apes / humans
(billion years ago)

In religion and mythology, the axis mundi (also cosmic axis, world axis, world pillar, columna cerului, center of the world) is a point described as the center of the world, the connection between it and Heaven, or both.

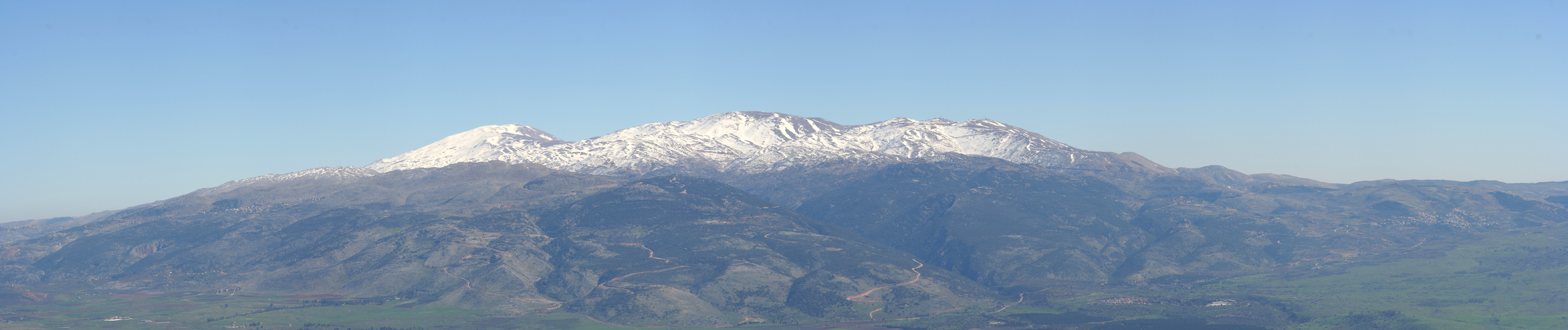
Mount Hermon in Lebanon was regarded in some cultures as the axis mundi.

Mount Hermon was regarded as the axis mundi in Canaanite tradition, from where the sons of God are introduced descending in 1 Enoch (1En6:6). The ancient Greeks regarded several sites as places of earth's omphalos (navel) stone, notably the oracle at Delphi, while still maintaining a belief in a cosmic world tree and in Mount Olympus as the abode of the gods. Judaism has the Temple Mount and Mount Sinai, Christianity has the Mount of Olives and Calvary, Islam has Mecca, said to be the place on earth that was created first, and the Temple Mount (Dome of the Rock). In Shinto, the Ise Shrine is the omphalos. In addition to the Kun Lun Mountains, where it is believed the peach tree of immortality is located, the Chinese folk religion recognizes four other specific mountains as pillars of the world.

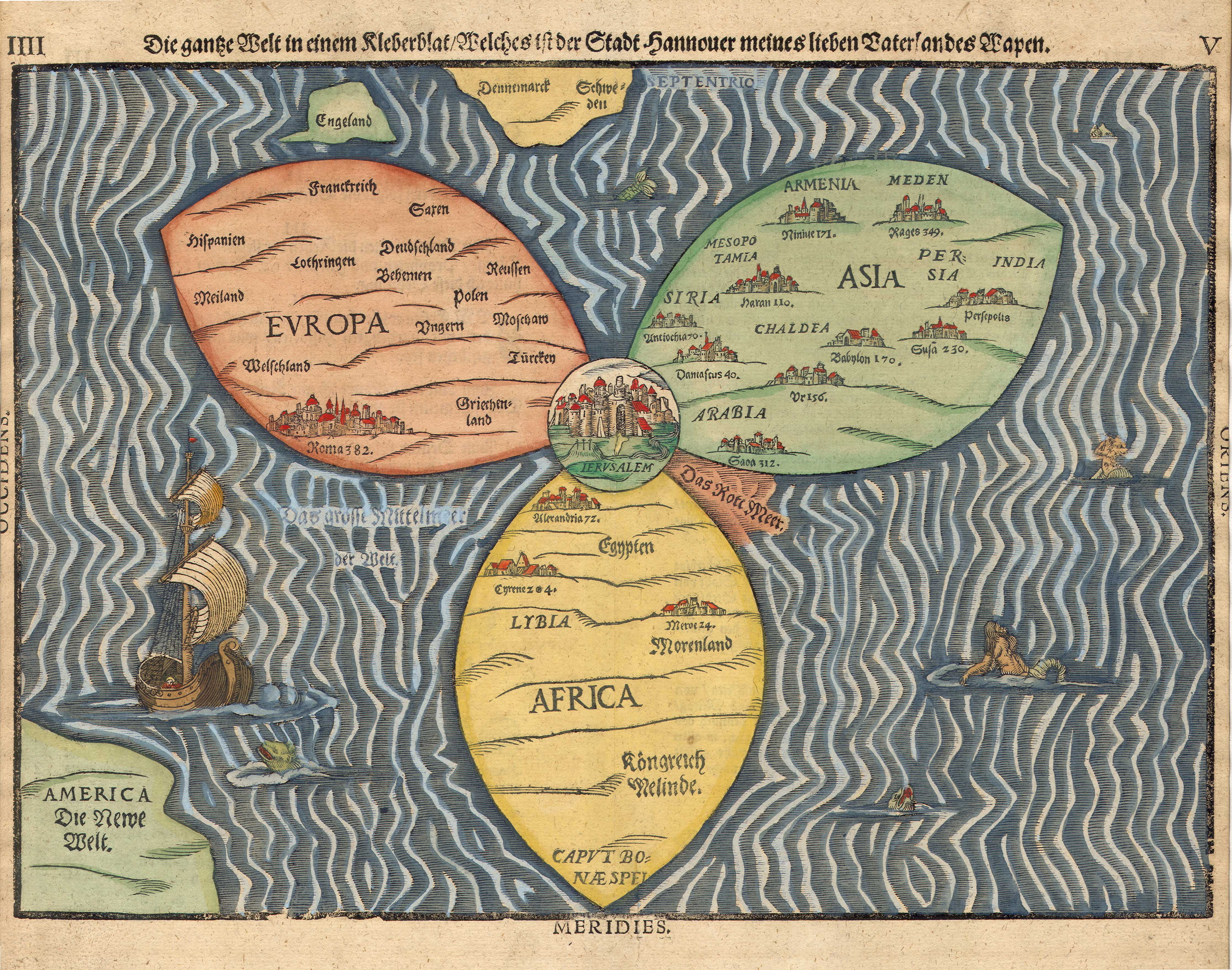
A 1581 map depicting Jerusalem as the center of the world

Sacred places constitute world centers (omphalos) with the altar or place of prayer as the axis. Altars, incense sticks, candles and torches form the axis by sending a column of smoke, and prayer, toward heaven. The architecture of sacred places often reflects this role. "Every temple or palace--and by extension, every sacred city or royal residence--is a Sacred Mountain, thus becoming a Centre." The stupa of Hinduism, and later Buddhism, reflects Mount Meru. Cathedrals are laid out in the form of a cross, with the vertical bar representing the union of Earth and heaven as the horizontal bars represent union of people to one another, with the altar at the intersection. Pagoda structures in Asian temples take the form of a stairway linking Earth and heaven. A steeple in a church or a minaret in a mosque also serve as connections of Earth and heaven. Structures such as the maypole, derived from the Saxons' Irminsul, and the totem pole among indigenous peoples of the Americas also represent world axes. The calumet, or sacred pipe, represents a column of smoke (the soul) rising form a world center. A mandala creates a world center within the boundaries of its two-dimensional space analogous to that created in three-dimensional space by a shrine.

In medieval times some Christians thought of Jerusalem as the center of the world (Latin: umbilicus mundi, Greek: Omphalos), and was so represented in the so-called T and O maps. Byzantine hymns speak of the Cross being "planted in the center of the earth."

== Center of a flat Earth ==
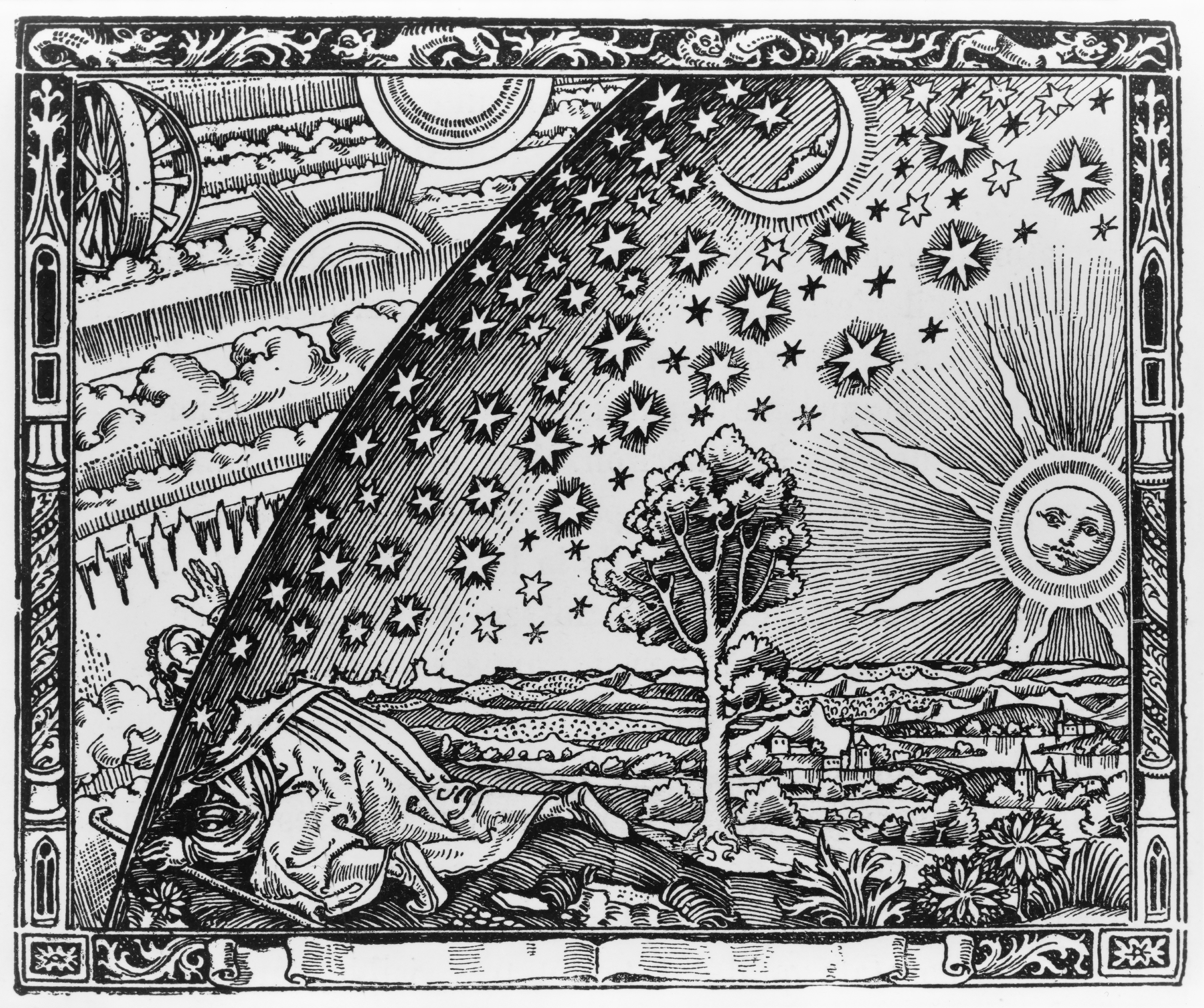
The Flammarion engraving (1888) depicts a traveller who arrives at the edge of a Flat Earth and sticks his head through the firmament.

The Flat Earth model is a belief that the Earth's shape is a plane or disk covered by a firmament containing heavenly bodies. Most pre-scientific cultures have had conceptions of a Flat Earth, including Greece until the classical period, the Bronze Age and Iron Age civilizations of the Near East until the Hellenistic period, India until the Gupta period (early centuries AD) and China until the 17th century. It was also typically held in the aboriginal cultures of the Americas, and a flat Earth domed by the firmament in the shape of an inverted bowl is common in pre-scientific societies. There would also be a unique point at the center of a spherical firmament (or a firmament that was a half-sphere).

== Earth as the center of the Universe ==
The Flat Earth model gave way to an understanding of a Spherical Earth. Aristotle (384–322 BC) provided observational arguments supporting the idea of a spherical Earth, namely that different stars are visible in different locations, travelers going south see southern constellations rise higher above the horizon, and the shadow of Earth on the Moon during a lunar eclipse is round, and spheres cast circular shadows while discs generally do not.

This understanding was accompanied by models of the Universe that depicted the Sun, Moon, stars, and naked eye planets circling the spherical Earth, including the noteworthy models of Aristotle (see Aristotelian physics) and Ptolemy. This geocentric model was the dominant model from the 4th century BC until the 17th century AD.

== Sun as center of the Universe ==
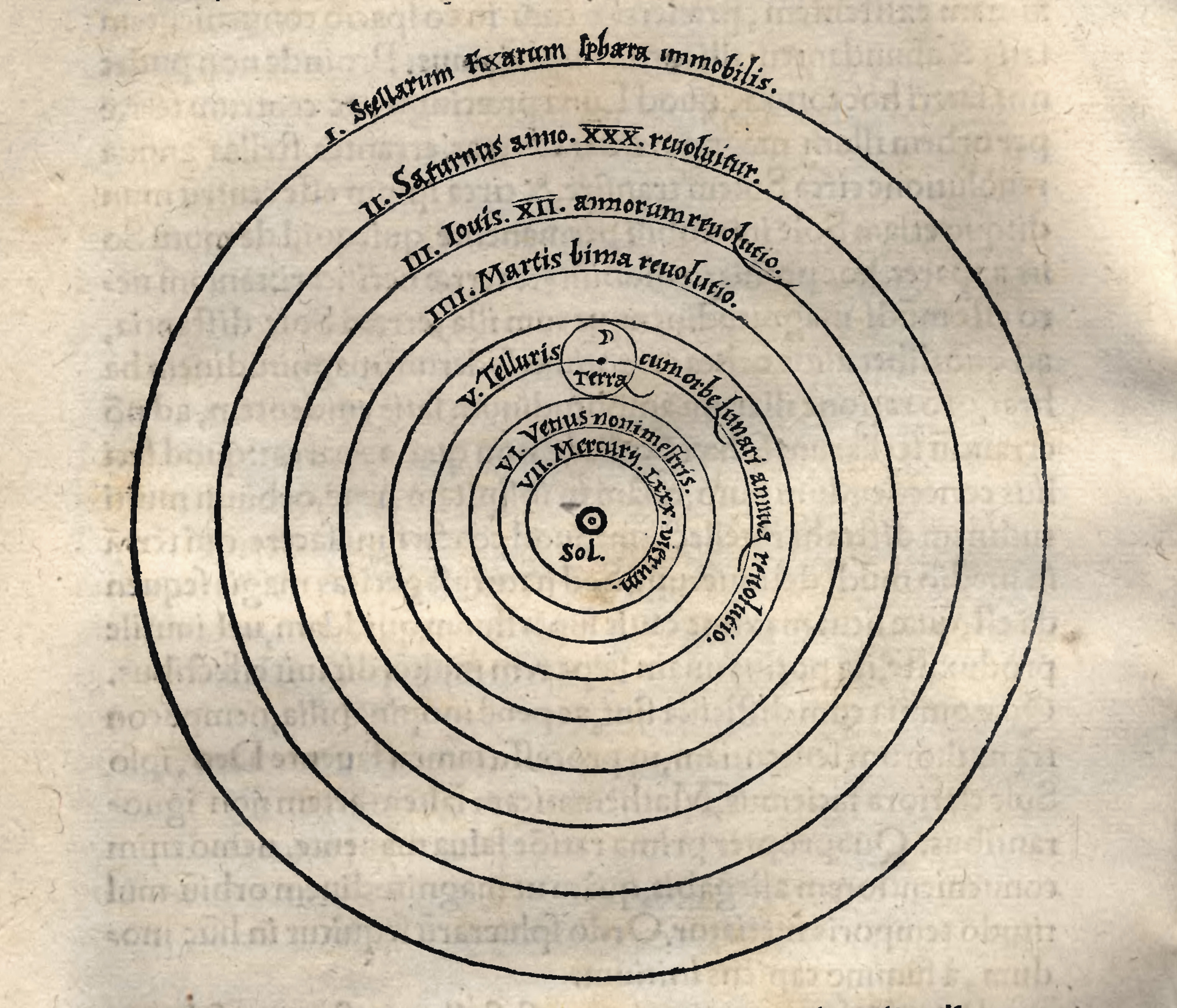
The heliocentric model from Nicolaus Copernicus' De revolutionibus orbium coelestium

Heliocentrism, or heliocentricism, (Note: Copernican heliocenterism held that the Sun itself was the center of the entire Universe. As it is modernly understood, Heliocenterism refers to the much narrower concept that the Sun is the center of the Solar System, not the center of the entire Universe.) is the astronomical model in which the Earth and planets revolve around a relatively stationary Sun at the center of the Solar System. The word comes from the Greek (ἥλιος helios 'sun' and κέντρον kentron 'center').

The notion that the Earth revolves around the Sun had been proposed as early as the 3rd century BC by Aristarchus of Samos, (Note: The work of Aristarchus's in which he proposed his heliocentric system has not survived. We only know of it now from a brief passage in Archimedes's The Sand Reckoner.) but had received no support from most other ancient astronomers.

Nicolaus Copernicus' major theory of a heliocentric model was published in De revolutionibus orbium coelestium (On the Revolutions of the Celestial Spheres), in 1543, the year of his death, though he had formulated the theory several decades earlier. Copernicus' ideas were not immediately accepted, but they did begin a paradigm shift away from the Ptolemaic geocentric model to a heliocentric model. The Copernican Revolution, as this paradigm shift would come to be called, would last until Isaac Newton’s work over a century later.

Johannes Kepler published his first two laws about planetary motion in 1609, having found them by analyzing the astronomical observations of Tycho Brahe. Kepler's third law was published in 1619. The first law was "The orbit of every planet is an ellipse with the Sun at one of the two foci."

In 1610, Galileo's student Benedetto Castelli suggested to Galileo that the Copernican model would predict that Venus would have phases like the phases of the moon. In late 1610 Galileo used one of his telescopes to record the phases of Venus, confirming the prediction. Neither Aristotelian physics nor Ptolemaic cosmology could explain these observations. The Tychonic system, which incorporated some Copernican ideas, would also predict Venusian phases, but Galileo rejected its physical assumption that Earth was fixed while much larger planets orbited the Sun.

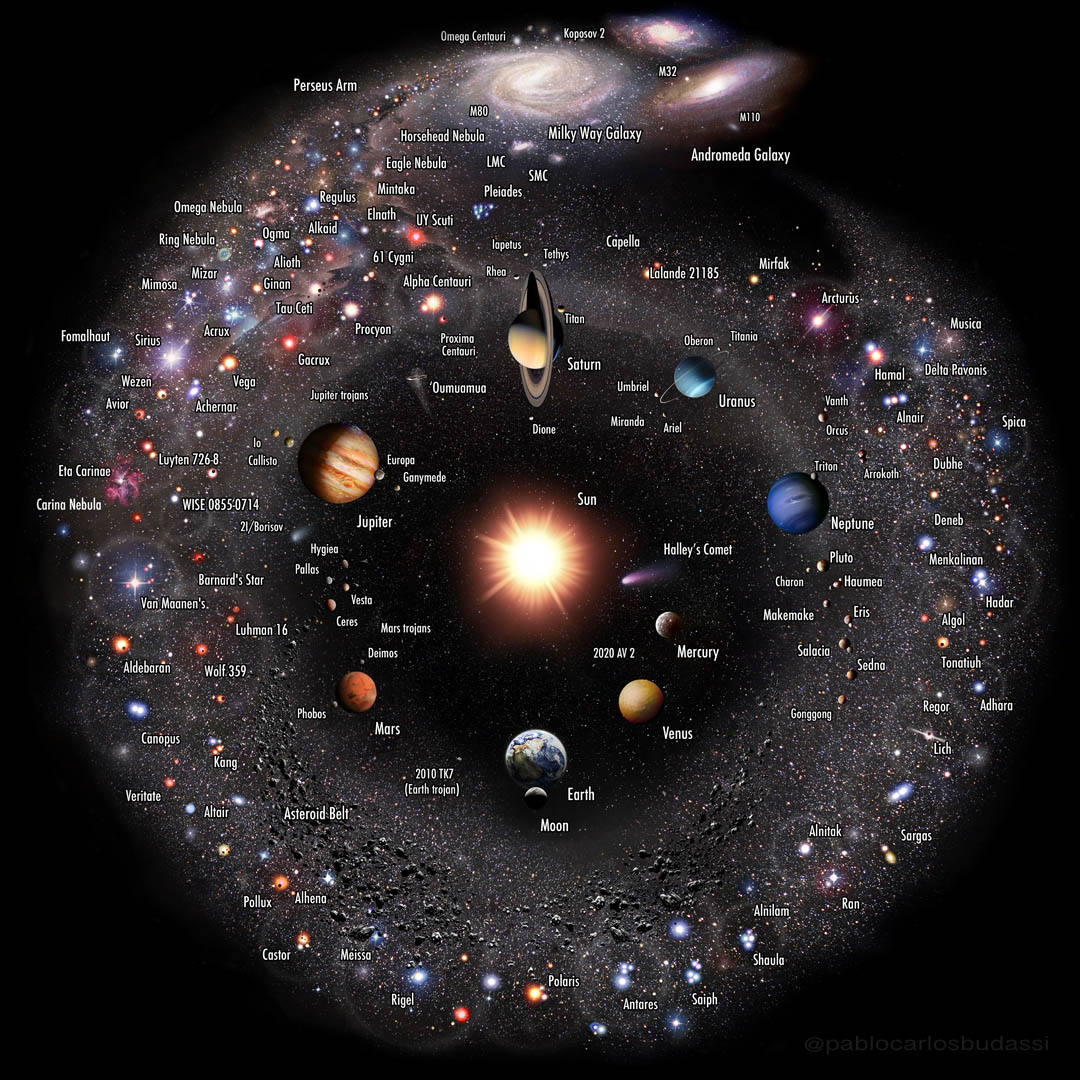
Modern illustration of the cosmic neighborhood centered on the Sun

Newton made clear his heliocentric view of the Solar System – developed in a somewhat modern way, because already in the mid-1680s he recognised the "deviation of the Sun" from the centre of gravity of the Solar System. For Newton, it was not precisely the centre of the Sun or any other body that could be considered at rest, but rather "the common centre of gravity of the Earth, the Sun and all the Planets is to be esteem'd the Centre of the World", and this centre of gravity "either is at rest or moves uniformly forward in a right line" (Newton adopted the "at rest" alternative in view of common consent that the centre, wherever it was, was at rest).

== Milky Way's Galactic Center as center of the Universe ==
Before the 1920s, it was generally believed that there were no galaxies other than the Milky Way (see for example The Great Debate). Thus, to astronomers of previous centuries, there was no distinction between a hypothetical center of the galaxy and a hypothetical center of the universe.

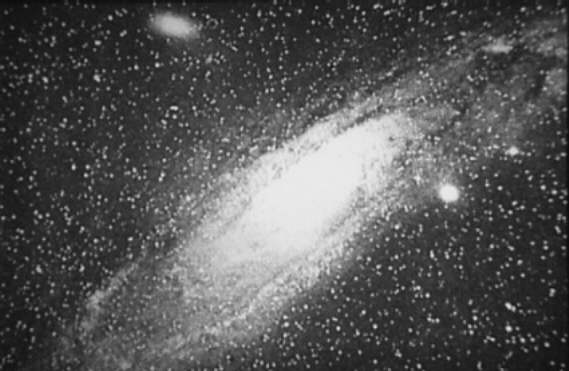
Great Andromeda Nebula by Isaac Roberts (1899)

In 1750 Thomas Wright, in his work An Original Theory or New Hypothesis of the Universe, correctly speculated that the Milky Way might be a body of a huge number of stars held together by gravitational forces rotating about a Galactic Center, akin to the Solar System but on a much larger scale. The resulting disk of stars can be seen as a band on the sky from the Earth's perspective inside the disk. In a treatise in 1755, Immanuel Kant elaborated on Wright's idea about the structure of the Milky Way. In 1785, William Herschel proposed such a model based on observation and measurement, leading to scientific acceptance of galactocentrism, a form of heliocentrism with the Sun at the center of the Milky Way.

The 19th century astronomer Johann Heinrich von Mädler proposed the Central Sun Hypothesis, according to which the stars of the universe revolved around a point in the Pleiades.

== The nonexistence of a center of the Universe ==
In 1917, Heber Doust Curtis observed a nova within what then was called the "Andromeda Nebula". Searching the photographic record, 11 more novas were discovered. Curtis noticed that novas in Andromeda were drastically fainter than novas in the Milky Way. Based on this, Curtis was able to estimate that Andromeda was 500,000 light-years away. As a result, Curtis became a proponent of the so-called "island Universes" hypothesis, which held that objects previously believed to be spiral nebulae within the Milky Way were actually independent galaxies.

In 1920, the Great Debate between Harlow Shapley and Curtis took place, concerning the nature of the Milky Way, spiral nebulae, and the dimensions of the Universe. To support his claim that the Great Andromeda Nebula (M31) was an external galaxy, Curtis also noted the appearance of dark lanes resembling the dust clouds in this galaxy, as well as the significant Doppler shift. In 1922 Ernst Öpik presented an elegant and simple astrophysical method to estimate the distance of M31. His result put the Andromeda Nebula far outside this galaxy at a distance of about 450,000 parsec, which is about 1,500,000 light years. Edwin Hubble settled the debate about whether other galaxies exist in 1925 when he identified extragalactic Cepheid variable stars for the first time on astronomical photos of M31. These were made using the 2.5 metre (100 in) Hooker telescope, and they enabled the distance of Great Andromeda Nebula to be determined. His measurement demonstrated conclusively that this feature was not a cluster of stars and gas within this galaxy, but an entirely separate galaxy located a significant distance from the Milky Way. This proved the existence of other galaxies.

=== Expanding Universe ===
Hubble also demonstrated that the redshift of other galaxies is approximately proportional to their distance from Earth (Hubble's law). This raised the appearance of this galaxy being in the center of an expanding Universe, however, Hubble rejected the findings philosophically:

...if we see the nebulae all receding from our position in space, then every other observer, no matter where he may be located, will see the nebulae all receding from his position. However, the assumption is adopted. There must be no favoured location in the Universe, no centre, no boundary; all must see the Universe alike. And, in order to ensure this situation, the cosmologist postulates spatial isotropy and spatial homogeneity, which is his way of stating that the Universe must be pretty much alike everywhere and in all directions."

The redshift observations of Hubble, in which galaxies appear to be moving away from us at a rate proportional to their distance from us, are now understood to be associated with the expansion of the universe. All observers anywhere in the Universe will observe the same effect.

=== Copernican and cosmological principles ===
The Copernican principle, named after Nicolaus Copernicus, states that the Earth is not in a central, specially favored position. Hermann Bondi named the principle after Copernicus in the mid-20th century, although the principle itself dates back to the 16th-17th century paradigm shift away from the geocentric Ptolemaic system.

The cosmological principle is an extension of the Copernican principle which states that the Universe is homogeneous (the same observational evidence is available to observers at different locations in the Universe) and isotropic (the same observational evidence is available by looking in any direction in the Universe). A homogeneous, isotropic Universe does not have a center.

== See also ==
- Cosmic microwave background
- Earth's inner core
- Galactic Center
- Geographical centre of Earth
- Great Attractor
- Illustris project
- List of places referred to as the Center of the Universe
- Multiverse
- Religious cosmology
- Sun – the center of the Solar System
- Three-torus model of the universe
