= John B. Lindale House =

Historic house in Delaware, United States

- U.S. National Register of Historic Places
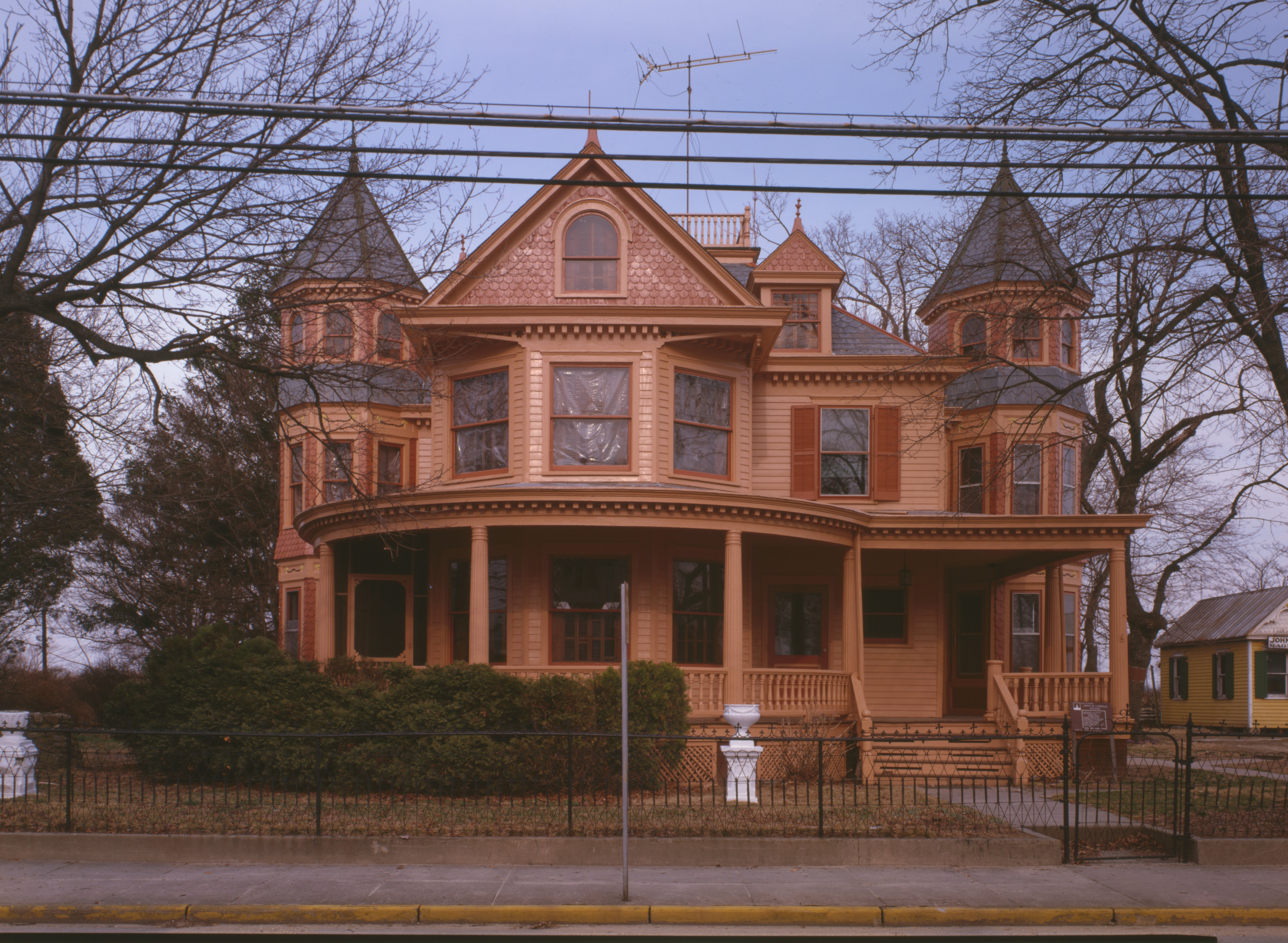
- John B. Lindale House, HABS Photo, July 1982

- Location within Delaware Location within the United States
- Location: 24 Main St., Magnolia, Delaware 39° 4'12.00"É 75°28'29.79"Ny
- Coordinates: 39°4′12″N 75°28′30″W
- Area: 3 acres (1.2 ha)
- Built: 1886
- Architect: Fisher, Charles G.
- Architectural style: Queen Anne
- NRHP reference No.: 73002231
- Added to NRHP: May 8, 1973

John B. Lindale House is a historic home located at Magnolia, Kent County, Delaware. It was built in 1886, and is a two-story, frame dwelling, in the Queen Anne style. It is almost square in plan, and features two-story bay windows, a large semi-circular projection, and polygonal turret towers.

It was listed on the National Register of Historic Places in 1973.
