= Apollo Omphalos (Athens) =

Ancient Greek sculpture

- Greek: Ἀπόλλων ἐπὶ τοῦ Ὀμφαλου
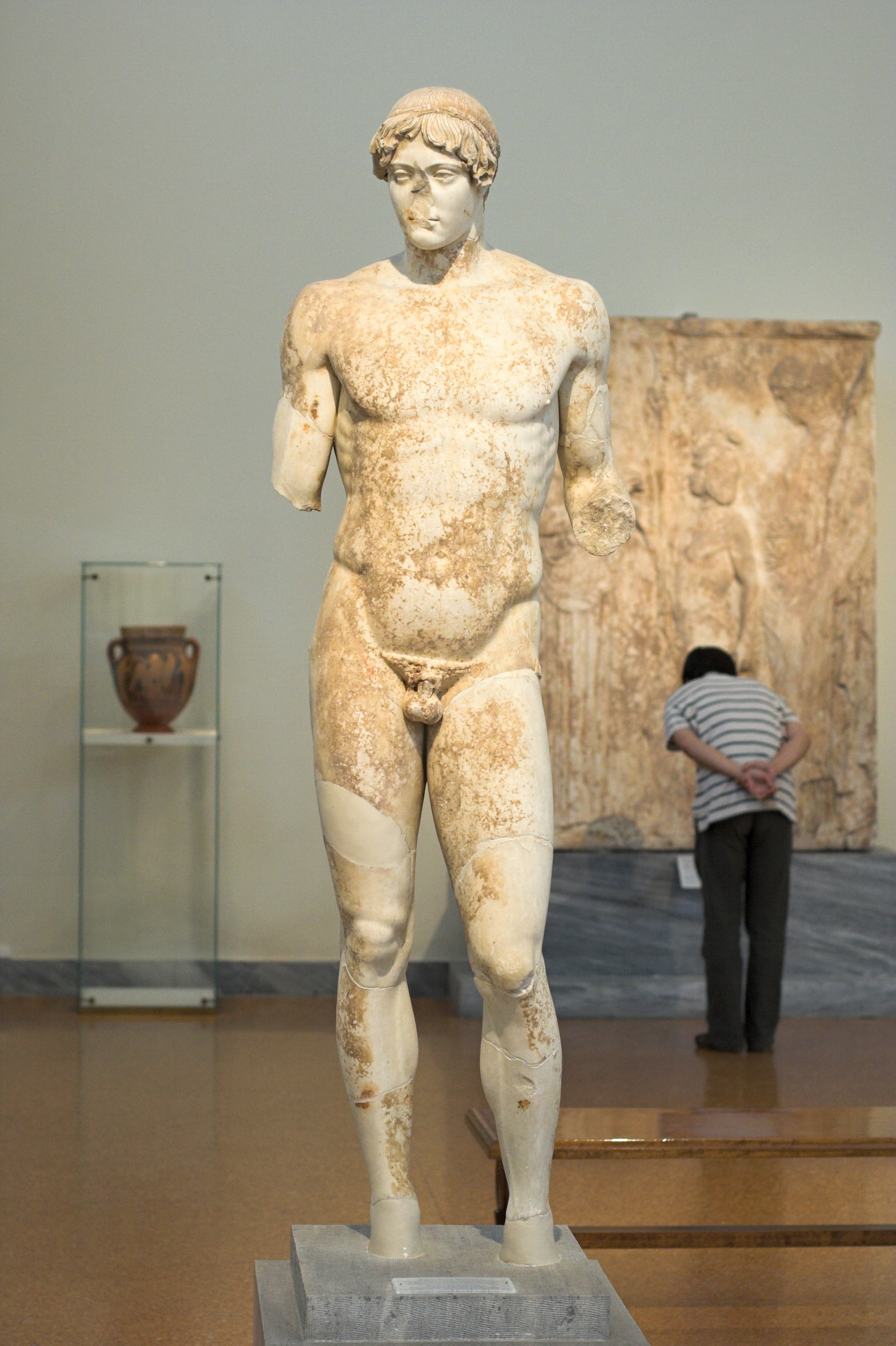
- The statue today
- Year: 2nd century AD
- Catalogue: No 45
- Medium: Marble
- Movement: Early archaic
- Subject: the god Apollo
- Dimensions: 1.76 m (69 in)
- Condition: Restored fragments
- Location: National Archaeological Museum, Athens
- Owner: Greece
- Website: https://www.namuseum.gr/

The Apollo Omphalos (Ancient Greek: Ἀπόλλων ἐπὶ τοῦ Ὀμφαλού) is an ancient Roman marble copy of a Greek original bronze sculpture in typical late Archaic period style, depicting Apollo, the Greek god of music, medicine, and prophecy. Today it is housed in the National Archaeological Museum of Athens, in Greece. The sculpture was found in several fragments which were put together, and bears several signs of damage.

== History ==
It was found in the Theatre of Dionysus in the Acropolis in the year 1862, and dubbed "Apollo Omphalos" because it was thought to have originally stood on an omphalos-shaped base. It was found in multiple fragments that were then put up together. Its accession number in the NAMA is 45.

== Description ==
The statue is made of pentelic marble, and is 1.76 m. tall (lifesize).

Apollo Omphalos is nude, standing firmly on his right leg while the left one is relaxed, slightly bent at knee-height; the pose's strong contrapposto causes the god's buttocks to move to the right. His hair is arranged in thick and heavy tresses, with two braids tied around his head. The statue is a second century AD Roman copy of an original Greek bronze one that was produced around 460-450 BC, and attributed to either Kalamis or Onatas. Waldstein tried to argue that the original sculpture was produced by Pythagoras of Rhegium, but this has been rejected.

The art movement it copies is the Archaic Greek art, which one can tell from Apollo's haircut, his stiff pose, the wide shoulders, the smaller head, and his face's rather vacant expression; nevertheless the body's composition shows the great knowledge and perception of nature of its artist.

== Condition ==
The statue was found in a fragmentary condition; the feet from the ankles down, the arms below the elbows, the nose and the mouth are all broken and missing, while parts of the thighs and left upper arm had to be restored.

== See also ==
- Hermes of Andros
- Apollon of Olympia
- Apollo of Cyrene
- Omphalos of Delphi

== Bibliography ==
- Kaltsas, Nikolaos (2002). Sculpture in the National Archaeological Museum, Athens. Los Angeles, US: The J. Paul Getty Museum. ISBN 0-89236-686-9.
- Kavvadias, Panagiotis (1890). Γλυπτά του Εθνικού Μουσείου [Sculptures of the National Museum] (in Greek). Athens, Greece: S. K. Vlastos.
