= Space Flight Operations Facility =

- Space Flight Operations Facility (The Center of the Universe)
- U.S. National Register of Historic Places
- U.S. National Historic Landmark
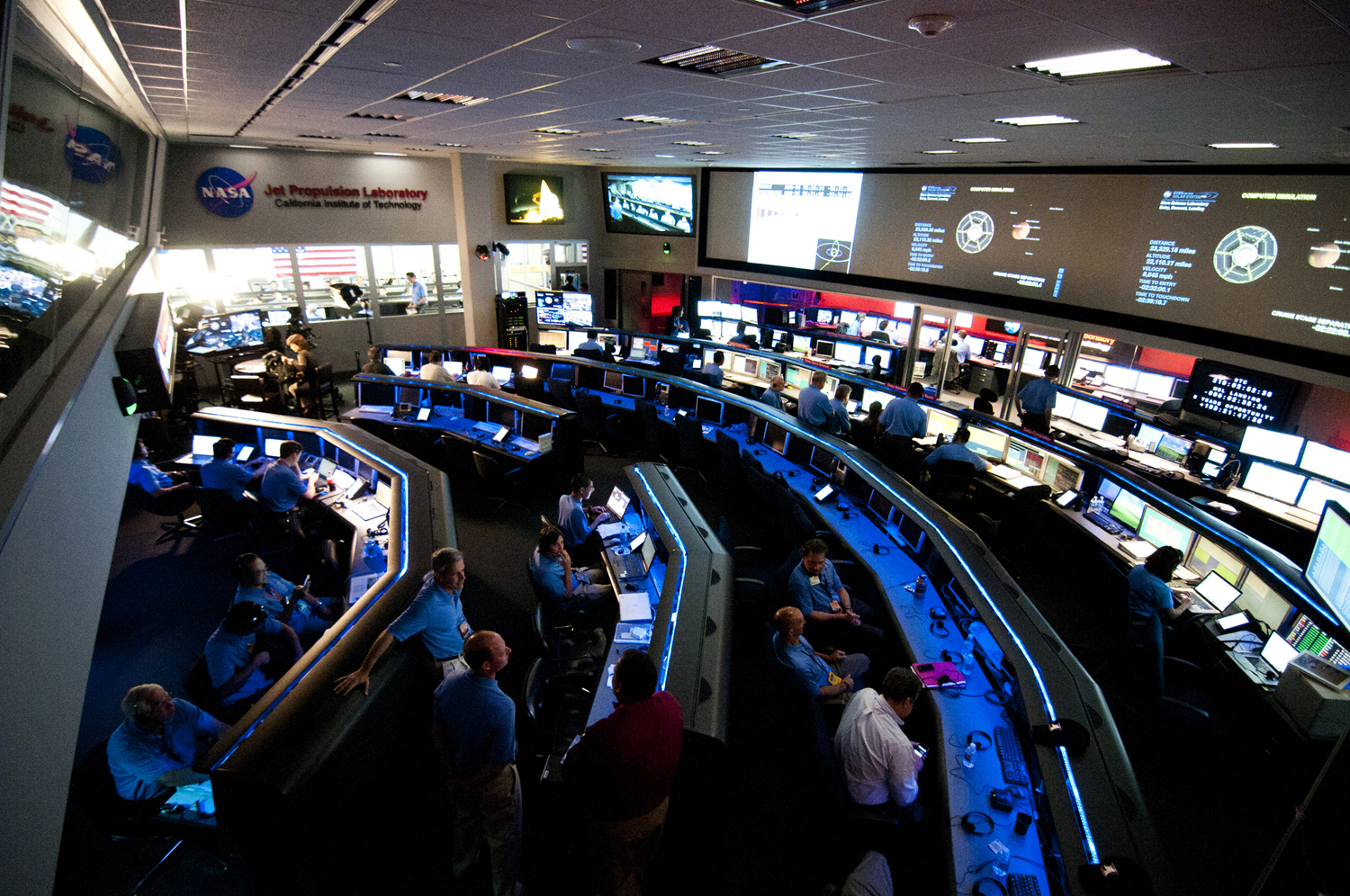
- The Space Flight Operations Center, a National Historic Landmark, has been operational and staffed every day since 1964.

- Location within the Los Angeles metropolitan area Location within California Location within the United States
- Location: Building 230, Jet Propulsion Laboratory, Pasadena, California
- Coordinates: 34°12′3.91″N 118°10′25.01″W
- Area: 122,074 square feet (11,340 m²)
- Built: 14th May 1964; 62 years ago
- Architect: NASA
- NRHP reference No.: 85002814

Significant dates
- Added to NRHP: October 03, 1985
- Designated NHL: October 3, 1985

The Space Flight Operations Facility (SFOF) is a building containing a control room and related computing and communications equipment areas at the Jet Propulsion Laboratory in Pasadena, California. NASA's Deep Space Network is operated from this facility. The SFOF has monitored and controlled all interplanetary and deep space exploration for NASA and other international space agencies since 1964. The facility also acted as a backup communications facility for Apollo missions.

It was declared a National Historic Landmark in 1985 and is on the National Register of Historic Places.

Public tours are available with advance planning.

== History ==
In the early years, the operations control center of the Deep Space Network did not have a permanent facility. It was a makeshift setup with numerous desks and phones installed in a large room near the computers used to calculate orbits. In July 1961, NASA started the construction of the permanent facility, Space Flight Operations Facility (SFOF). The facility was completed in October 1963 dedicated on May 14, 1964. In the initial setup of the SFOF, there were 31 consoles, 100 closed-circuit television cameras, and more than 200 television displays to support Ranger 6 to Ranger 9 and Mariner 4.

== Current operations ==
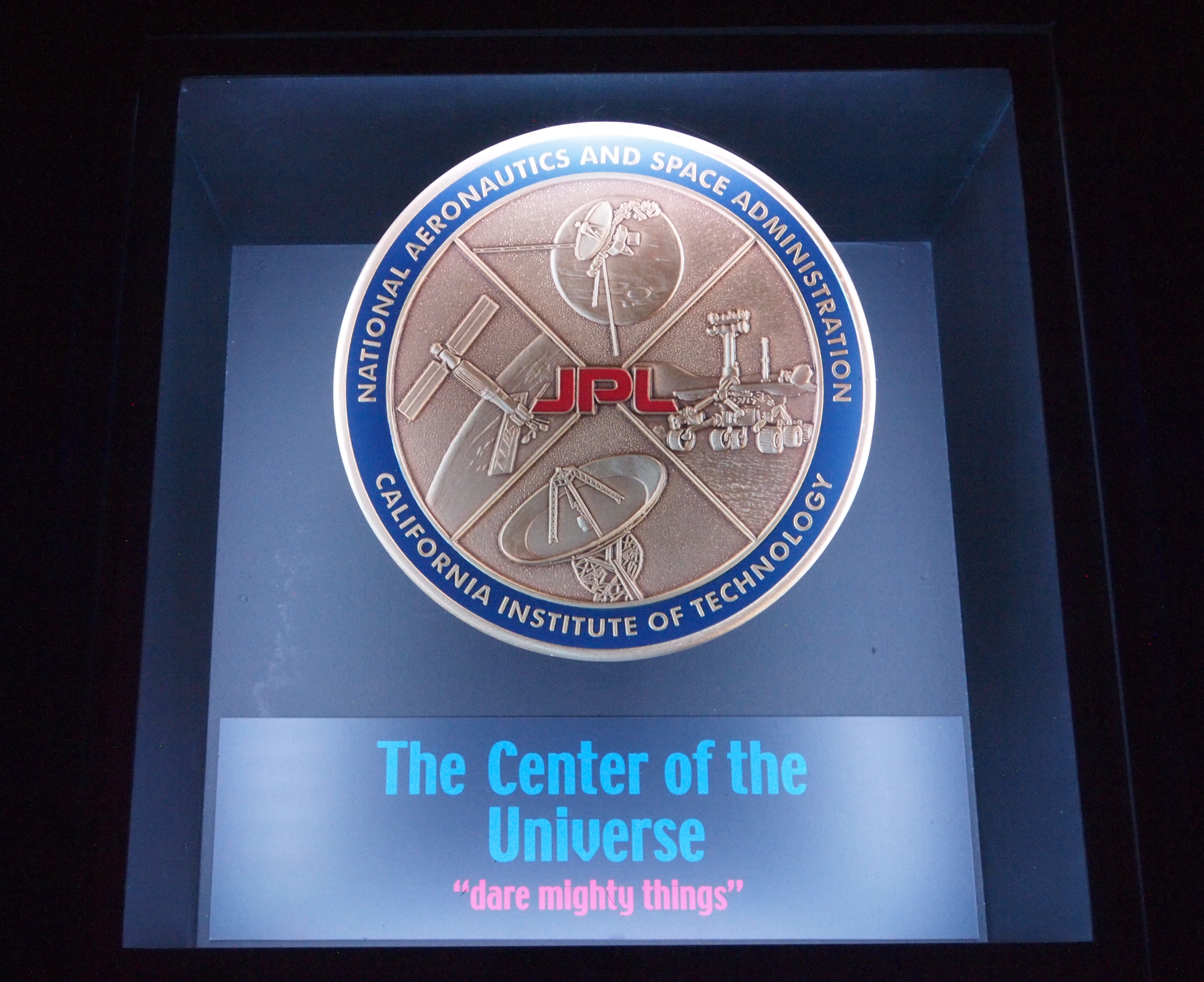
The Center of the Universe plaque

As of 2012, there were 22 spacecraft monitored from this facility. Depending on the operations of the spacecraft, they are scheduled to be online for 1 to 10 hours at a time. Notable is that the facility also processes the signal from Voyager 1 that is sent from about 11 billion miles from Earth. With data feeding into the Space Flight Operations Facility from every NASA spacecraft beyond low Earth orbit, including rovers, orbiters, and deep-space probes, there is a plaque in the middle of the room designating the facility "The Center of the Universe."

panaorama of the SFOF from the center of the room between the Cassini and Curiosity mission control consoles

== See also ==
A list of other Deep Space Network facilities:

- Goldstone Deep Space Communications Complex
- Madrid Deep Space Communication Complex
- Canberra Deep Space Communication Complex
