= Omphalos =

Religious stone artefact

An omphalos is a religious stone artefact. In Ancient Greek, the word ὀμφᾰλός (omphalós) means "navel". Among the Ancient Greeks, it was a widespread belief that Delphi was the center of the world. According to the myths regarding the founding of the Delphic Oracle, Zeus, in his attempt to locate the center of the Earth, launched two eagles from the two ends of the world, and the eagles, starting simultaneously and flying at equal speed, crossed their paths above the area of Delphi, and so that was the place where Zeus placed the stone. The Latin term is umbilicus mundi, 'navel of the world'.

Omphalos is also the name of the stone given to Cronus.

== Delphi ==
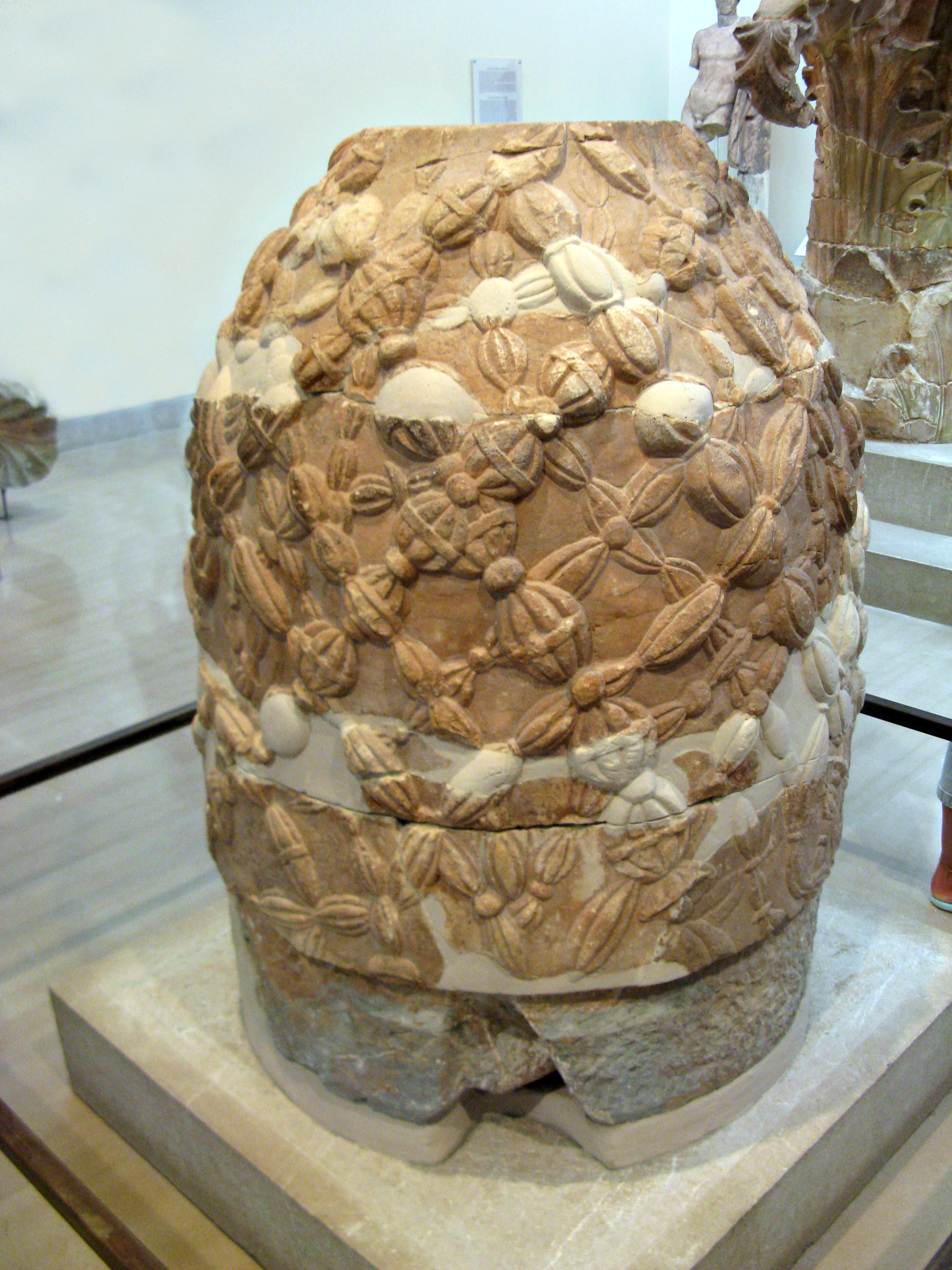
The Omphalos of Delphi

Most accounts locate the Delphi omphalos in the adyton (sacred part of the temple) near the Pythia (oracle). The stone sculpture itself, which may be a copy, has a carving of a knotted net covering its surface and a hollow center, widening towards the base. The omphalos represents the stone which Rhea wrapped in swaddling clothes, pretending it was Zeus, in order to deceive Cronus. (Cronus was the father who swallowed his children so as to prevent them from usurping him as he had deposed his own father, Uranus.)

Omphalos stones were believed to allow direct communication with the gods. Holland (1933) suggested that the stone was hollow to allow intoxicating vapours breathed by the Oracle to channel through it. Erwin Rohde wrote that the Python at Delphi was an earth spirit, who was conquered by Apollo and buried under the Omphalos. However, understanding of the use of the omphalos is uncertain due to destruction of the site by Theodosius I and Arcadius in the 4th century CE.

== Art ==
Omphalos is a public art sculpture by Dimitri Hadzi formerly located in Harvard Square, Cambridge, Massachusetts under the Arts on the Line program. The sculpture was removed on 2014, to be relocated to Rockport, Massachusetts.

Omfalos is a concrete and rock sculpture by the conceptual artist Lars Vilks, previously standing in the Kullaberg nature reserve, Skåne County, Sweden. As of 2001, the sculpture belongs to the collections of Moderna Museet in Stockholm, Sweden.

== Literature ==
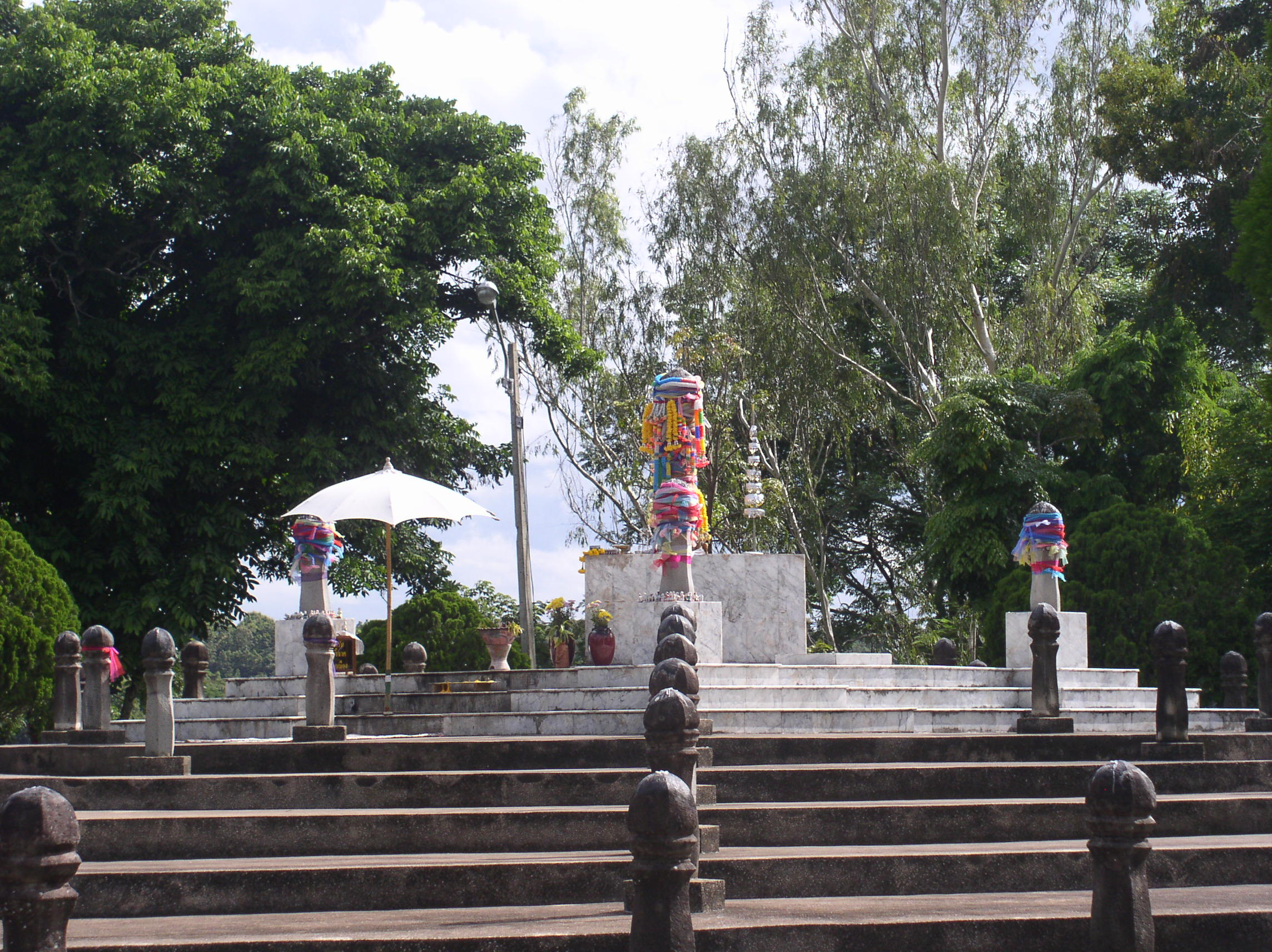
Omphalos of Chiang Rai, Thailand.

In literature, the word omphalos has held various meanings but usually refers to the stone at Delphi. Authors who have used the term include: Homer, Pausanias, D.H. Lawrence, James Joyce, Philip K. Dick, Jacques Derrida, Ted Chiang, Sandy Hingston and Seamus Heaney. For example, Joyce uses the term in the novel, Ulysses:

"Billy Pitt had them built," Buck Mulligan said, "when the French were on the sea but ours is the omphalos." [Chapter 1]

One of her sisterhood lugged me squealing into life. Creation from nothing. What has she in the bag? A misbirth with a trailing navelcord, hushed in ruddy wool. The cords of all link back, strandentwining cable of all flesh. That is why mystic monks. Will you be as gods? Gaze in your omphalos. [Chapter 3]

[...] to set up there a national fertilising farm to be named Omphalos with an obelisk hewn and erected after the fashion of Egypt and to offer his dutiful yeoman services for the fecundation of any female of what grade of life soever who should there direct to him with the desire of fulfilling the functions of her natural. [Chapter 14]

In Ted Chiang's short story "Omphalos" (2019), the protagonist is forced to question her belief about where the center of the world is located.

In "The Toome Road", a Seamus Heaney poem from the 1979 anthology Field Work, Heaney writes about an encounter with a convoy of armoured cars in Northern Ireland, "… O charioteers, above your dormant guns, It stands here still, stands vibrant as you pass, The invisible, untoppable omphalos."

== Omphalos syndrome ==
Omphalos syndrome refers to the belief that a place of geopolitical power and currency is the most important place in the world.

== See also ==
- Axis mundi – Earth's axis, or a Heaven-Earth connection
- Apollo Omphalos – Ancient Greek sculpture
- Benben stone – Sacred stone in the temple of Ra at Heliopolis
- Black Stone – Islamic relic at the Kaaba in Mecca
- Foundation Stone – Rock at centre of the Dome of the Rock shrine
- Kaaba – Building at the center of Masjid al-Haram
- Kanrodai – Sacred pillar in Tenrikyo and its derived religions
- Lapis Niger – Ancient shrine at the Forum Romanum
- Lia Fáil – Standing stone on the Hill of Tara, Ireland
- Lingam – Aniconic representation of the Hindu god Shiva
- Name of Mexico
- Stone of Scone – Ancient Scottish coronation artefact
- Umbilicus urbis Romae – Archaeological site in Rome, Italy
- Omphale – Daughter of Iardanus, in Greek mythology
