= Omphalos of Delphi =

Ancient marble monument in Greece

Coordinates: 38.4816887°N 22.5013012°E

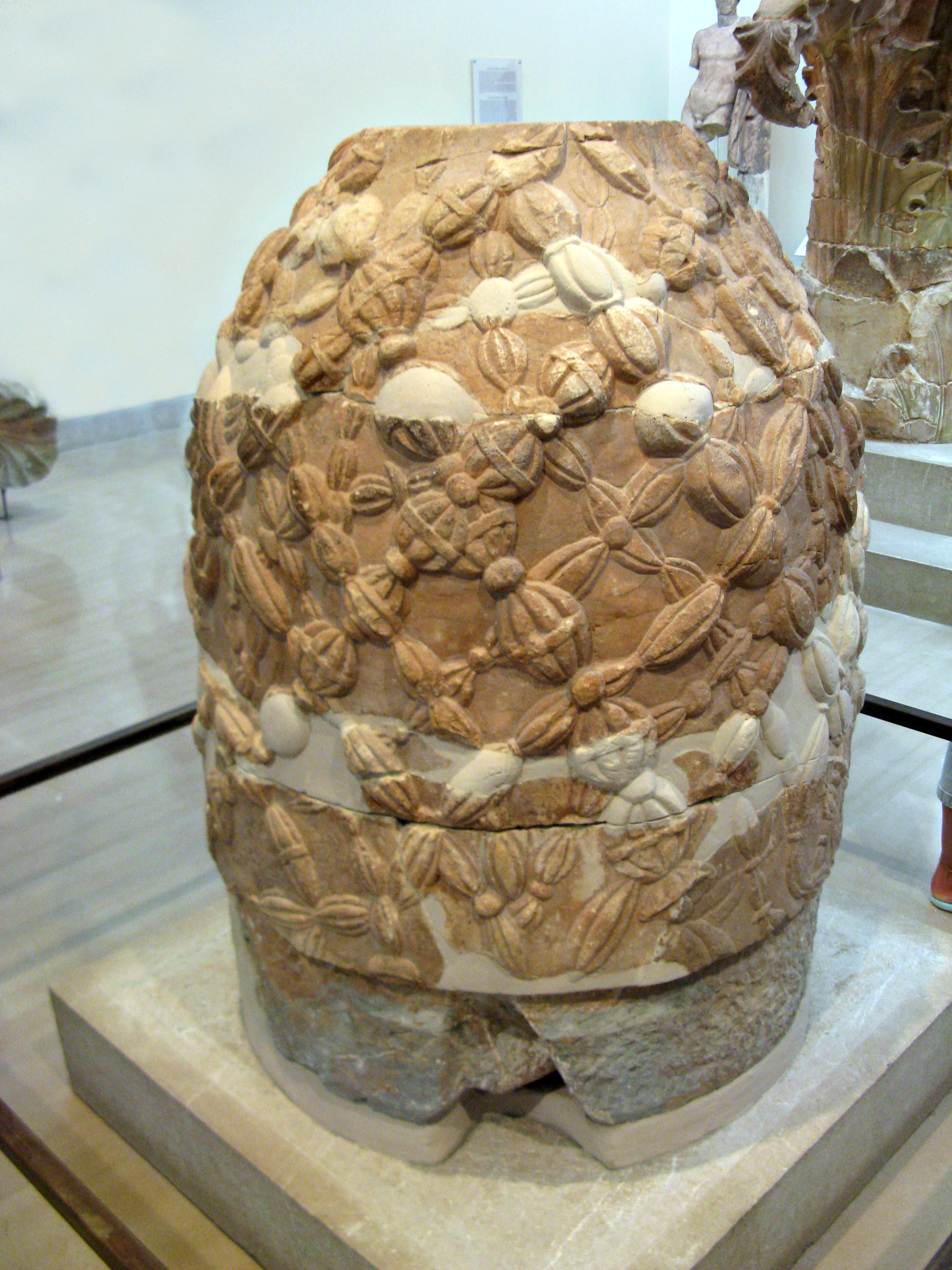
The omphalos in the museum of Delphi

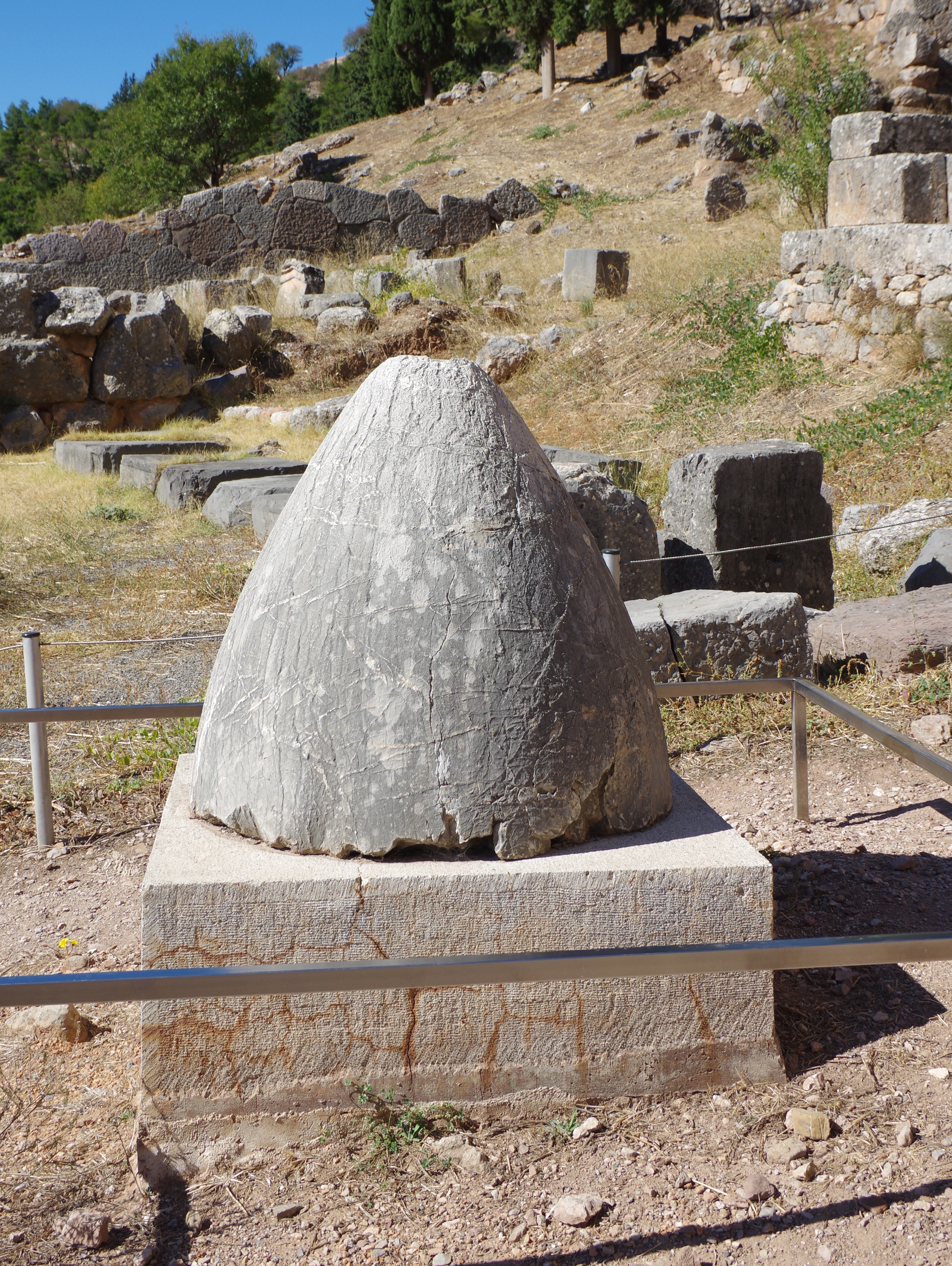
The omphalos stone displayed outside at Delphi, Greece

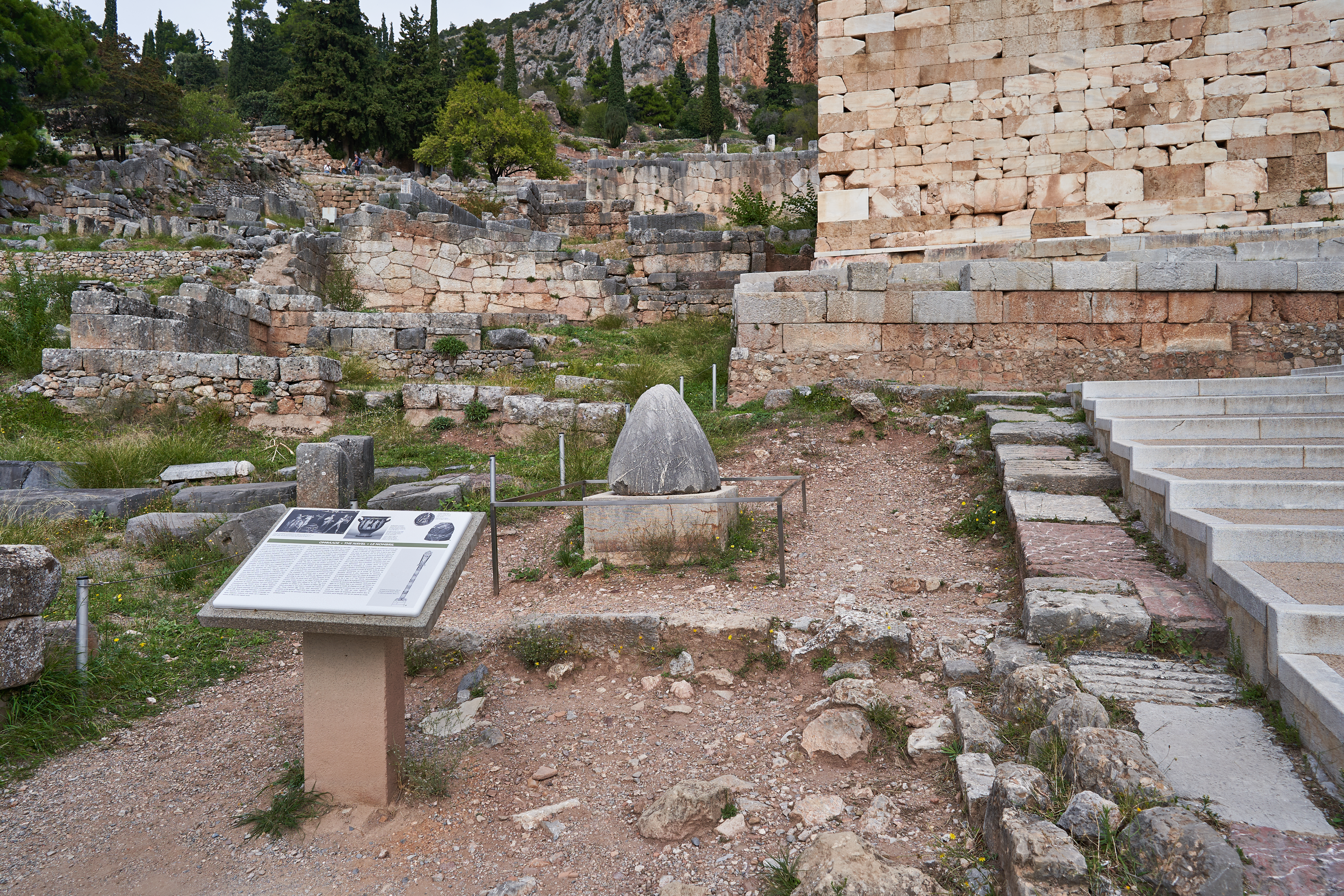
The omphalos stone in context

The Omphalos of Delphi is an ancient marble monument that was found at the archaeological site of Delphi, Greece. According to the Ancient Greek myths regarding the founding of the Delphic Oracle, the god Zeus, in his attempt to locate the center of the Earth, launched two eagles from the two ends of the world, and the eagles, starting simultaneously and flying at equal speed, crossed their paths above the area of Delphi, and so was the place where Zeus placed the stone. Since then, Delphi has been considered by Greeks to be the center of the world, as the site of the original omphalos – "navel of the Earth."

Hesiod's telling of the myth in The Theogony says Zeus set up for veneration at Mount Parnassus the same stone given by his mother Rhea to his father Kronos to eat in his place, which had allowed Zeus to begin his reign.

A version of the omphalos once used in the temple is held in Delphi Archaeological Museum; there is also a simplified copy at the site where it was found.

== Description ==
The marble-carved stone that constituted the omphalos in the monument with the tripod and the dancers troubled the excavators, because they could not decide if it was the original or a copy from Hellenistic and Roman times. In the 2nd century AD, Pausanias traveled to the area of Delphi and has provided us with rare evidence through his work. The stone of the omphalos seems to have been decorated in high relief and had an oval shape. It is possible that in ancient times it was covered by a mesh of wool cloth, and it was kept in the adyton (inner sanctum), beside the tripod and the daphne (bay leaves) – the other sacred symbols of the god. As described by Pausanias, within the woolen cloth that was wound around the stone, there were precious stones designed in the shape of a mermaid, while two gilded eagles were fixed on top of it.

Recent studies by French archaeologists have demonstrated that the omphalos and the columns are connected and interlocked. In other words, the stone navel was mounted on the bronze tripods supported by the three dancers, at the top of the column. This is the spot where the omphalos is thought to have been placed until today, as a cover of the column, in order to reinforce the meaning and importance of the Athenian votive offering symbolically. The Athenians, wanting to placate and honor the god of light, offered him this copy of the original stone, which combined both Delphic symbols as a gift from the hands of the three priestess figures of Athenian origin.

== See also ==
- Omphalos (Omphalos is also the name of the stone given by Zeus's mother Rhea to Cronus to eat in place of her new-born son.)
- Apollo Omphalos, statue of Apollo
