= 2026 Delaware House of Representatives election =

2026 Delaware House of Representatives elections
- November 3, 2026

All 41 seats in the Delaware House of Representatives 21 seats needed for a majority
	Majority party	Minority party
Leader	Melissa Minor-Brown	Timothy Dukes
Party	Democratic	Republican
Leader since	January 14, 2025	January 14, 2025
Leader's seat	17th - New Castle	40th- Laurel
Last election	27	14
Seats won	30	11
Seat change	▲3	▼3
- Democratic incumbent Democratic incumbent retiring Republican incumbent Republican incumbent retiring
Speaker before election
Melissa Minor-Brown
Democratic
Elected Speaker
TBD

The 2026 Delaware House of Representatives election was held on November 3, 2026, alongside the Delaware Senate election and the other 2026 United States elections. Voters elected members of the Delaware House of Representatives in all 41 of the U.S. state of Delaware's legislative districts to serve a two-year term.

== Retirements ==
=== Democrats ===
1. District 23: Mara Gorman is retiring to run for state senate in the 8th district.

=== Republicans ===
1. District 33: Charles Postles Jr. is retiring.
2. District 38: Ronald E. Gray is retiring.
3. District 41: Richard G. Collins is retiring.

== Predictions ==
Source	Ranking	As of
Sabato's Crystal Ball	Safe D	October 16, 2026
State Navigate	Safe D	October 14, 2026

== Summary of results by district ==
District	2024 pres.	Incumbent	Party	Elected representative	Outcome
1st	D+77.6	Nnamdi Chukwuocha	Dem	Nnamdi Chukwuocha	Dem
2nd	D+71.9	Stephanie Bolden	Dem	Michelle H. Booker	Dem
3rd	D+65.2	Josue Ortega	Dem	Branden Fletcher-Dominguez	Dem
4th	R+6.7	Jeff Hilovsky	Rep	Gregg Lindner	Dem
5th	D+57.7	Kendra Johnson	Dem	Kendra Johnson	Dem
6th	D+35.1	Debra Heffernan	Dem	Rae Krantz	Dem
7th	D+37.2	Larry Lambert	Dem	Larry Lambert	Dem
8th	D+23.8	Sherae'a Moore	Dem	Sherae'a Moore	Dem
9th	D+15.5	Kevin Hensley	Rep	Ayanna Khan-Flowers	Dem
10th	D+25.5	Melanie Ross Levin	Dem	Melanie Ross Levin	Dem
11th	R+24.3	Jeffrey Spiegelman	Rep	Jeffrey Spiegelman	Rep
12th	D+28.8	Krista Griffith	Dem	Krista Griffith	Dem
13th	D+25.2	DeShanna Neal	Dem	DeShanna Neal	Dem
14th	D+22.2	Claire Snyder-Hall	Dem	Claire Snyder-Hall	Dem
15th	D+34.1	Kamela Smith	Dem	Kamela Smith	Dem
16th	D+54.5	Franklin Cooke Jr.	Dem	Pamela Salaam	Dem
17th	D+36.4	Melissa Minor-Brown	Dem	Melissa Minor-Brown	Dem
18th	D+40.1	Sophie Phillips	Dem	Sophie Phillips	Dem
19th	D+16.1	Kimberly Williams	Dem	Kimberly Williams	Dem
20th	D+8.5	Alonna Berry	Dem	Alonna Berry	Dem
21st	D+18.3	Frank Burns	Dem	Frank Burns	Dem
22nd	D+16.3	Michael F. Smith	Rep	Michael F. Smith	Rep
23rd	D+30.6	Mara Gorman	Dem	Dave Redlawsk	Dem
24th	D+26.7	Edward Osienski	Dem	Edward Osienski	Dem
25th	D+31.1	Cyndie Romer	Dem	Cyndie Romer	Dem
26th	D+42.3	Madinah Wilson-Anton	Dem	Madinah Wilson-Anton	Dem
27th	D+16.9	Eric Morrison	Dem	Eric Morrison	Dem
28th	D+16.6	William Carson Jr.	Dem	Tyiesha Grier	Dem
29th	D+16.9	William Bush IV	Dem	William Bush IV	Dem
30th	R+35.6	W. Shannon Morris	Rep	W. Shannon Morris	Rep
31st	D+39.5	Sean Lynn	Dem	Sean Lynn	Dem
32nd	D+25.6	Kerri Evelyn Harris	Dem	Kerri Evelyn Harris	Dem
33rd	R+14.1	Charles Postles Jr.	Rep	Morgan Hudson	Rep
34th	D+5.3	Lyndon Yearick	Rep	Annie Norman	Dem
35th	R+31.4	Jesse Vanderwende	Rep	Jesse Vanderwende	Rep
36th	R+12.1	Bryan Shupe	Rep	Bryan Shupe	Rep
37th	R+14.8	Valerie Jones Giltner	Rep	Valerie Jones Giltner	Rep
38th	R+11.8	Ronald E. Gray	Rep	Cylie Carie	Rep
39th	R+23	Daniel Short	Rep	Daniel Short	Rep
40th	R+43.8	Timothy Dukes	Rep	Timothy Dukes	Rep
41st	R+26.9	Richard G. Collins	Rep	John C. Atkins	Rep

== District 1 ==
The 1st district is represented by Democrat Nnamdi Chukwuocha, who is eligible to run for re-election but has not yet stated if he will do so.

== District 2 ==
The 2nd district is represented by Democrat Stephanie Bolden, who is eligible to run for re-election but has not yet stated if she will do so.

== District 3 ==
The 3rd district is represented by Democrat Josue Ortega, who is eligible to run for re-election but has not yet stated if he will do so.

== District 4 ==
The 4th district is represented by Republican Jeff Hilovsky, who is eligible to run for re-election but has not yet stated if he will do so.

== District 5 ==
The 5th district is represented by Democrat Kendra Johnson, who is eligible to run for re-election but has not yet stated if she will do so.

== District 6 ==
The 6th district is represented by Democrat Debra Heffernan, who is eligible to run for re-election but has not yet stated if she will do so.

== District 7 ==
The 7th district is represented by Democrat Larry Lambert, who is eligible to run for re-election but has not yet stated if he will do so.

== District 8 ==
The 8th district is represented by Democrat Sherae'a Moore, who is eligible to run for re-election but has not yet stated if she will do so.

== District 9 ==
The 9th district is represented by Republican Kevin Hensley, who is eligible to run for re-election but has not yet stated if he will do so.

== District 10 ==
The 10th district is represented by Democrat Melanie Ross Levin, who is eligible to run for re-election but has not yet stated if she will do so.

== District 11 ==
The 11th district is represented by Republican Jeffrey Spiegelman, who is eligible to run for re-election but has not yet stated if he will do so.

== District 12 ==
The 12th district is represented by Democrat Krista Griffith, who is eligible to run for re-election but has not yet stated if she will do so.

== District 13 ==
The 13th district is represented by Democrat DeShanna Neal, who is eligible to run for re-election but has not yet stated if they will do so.

== District 14 ==
The 14th district is represented by Democrat Claire Snyder-Hall, who is eligible to run for re-election but has not yet stated if she will do so.

== District 15 ==
The 15th district is represented by Democrat Kamela Smith, who is eligible to run for re-election but has not yet stated if she will do so.

== District 16 ==
The 16th district is represented by Democrat Franklin Cooke Jr., who is eligible to run for re-election but has not yet stated if he will do so.

== District 17 ==
The 17th district is represented by Democrat Melissa Minor-Brown, who is eligible to run for re-election but has not yet stated if she will do so.

== District 18 ==
The 18th district is represented by Democrat Sophie Phillips, who is eligible to run for re-election but has not yet stated if she will do so.

== District 19 ==
The 19th district is represented by Democrat Kimberly Williams, who is eligible to run for re-election but has not yet stated if she will do so.

== District 20 ==
The 20th district is represented by Democrat Alonna Berry, who is running for reelection.

== District 21 ==
The 21st district is represented by Democrat Frank Burns, who is eligible to run for re-election but has not yet stated if he will do so.

== District 22 ==
The 22nd district is represented by Republican Michael F. Smith, who is eligible to run for re-election but has not yet stated if he will do so.

== District 23 ==
The 23rd district is represented by Democrat Mara Gorman, who is retiring to run for state senate in the 8th district.

== District 24 ==
The 24th district is represented by Democrat Edward Osienski, who is eligible to run for re-election but has not yet stated if he will do so.

== District 25 ==
The 25th district is represented by Democrat Cyndie Romer, who is eligible to run for re-election but has not yet stated if she will do so.

== District 26 ==
The 26th district is represented by Democrat Madinah Wilson-Anton, who is eligible to run for re-election but has not yet stated if she will do so.

== District 27 ==
The 27th district is represented by Democrat Eric Morrison, who is eligible to run for re-election but has not yet stated if he will do so.

== District 28 ==
The 28th district is represented by Democrat William Carson Jr., who is eligible to run for re-election but has not yet stated if he will do so.

== District 29 ==
The 29th district is represented by Democrat William Bush IV, who is eligible to run for re-election but has not yet stated if he will do so.

== District 30 ==
The 30th district is represented by Republican W. Shannon Morris, who is eligible to run for re-election but has not yet stated if he will do so.

== District 31 ==
The 31st district is represented by Democrat Sean Lynn, who is eligible to run for re-election but has not yet stated if he will do so.

== District 32 ==
The 32nd district is represented by Democrat Kerri Evelyn Harris, who is eligible to run for re-election but has not yet stated if she will do so.

== District 33 ==
The 33rd district is represented by Republican Charles Postles Jr., who announced on November 25, 2025, that he would not seek re-election.

== District 34 ==
The 34th district is represented by Republican Lyndon Yearick, who is eligible to run for re-election but has not yet stated if he will do so.

== District 35 ==
The 35th district is represented by Republican Jesse Vanderwende, who is eligible to run for re-election but has not yet stated if he will do so.

== District 36 ==
The 36th district is represented by Republican Bryan Shupe, who is eligible to run for re-election but has not yet stated if he will do so.

== District 37 ==
The 37th district is represented by Republican Valerie Jones Giltner, who is eligible to run for re-election but has not yet stated if she will do so.

== District 38 ==
The 38th district is represented by Republican Ronald E. Gray, who has stated that he will not be running for reelection and has endorsed Carlie Carey for his seat.

== District 39 ==
The 39th district is represented by Republican Daniel Short, who is eligible to run for re-election but has not yet stated if he will do so.

== District 40 ==
The 40th district is represented by Republican Timothy Dukes, who is eligible to run for re-election but has not yet stated if he will do so.

== District 41 ==
The 41st district is represented by Republican Richard G. Collins, who announced on November 25, 2025, that he would not seek re-election in 2026.
