= 153rd Delaware General Assembly =

The 153rd Delaware General Assembly consists of the members of the Delaware House of Representatives elected in 2024.

== House of Representatives ==
=== Current composition ===
27	14
Democratic	Republican

Affiliation	Party (Shading indicates majority caucus)		Total	
Affiliation	Democratic	Republican	Total	Vacant
November 8, 2022	26	15	41	0
Current	27	14	41	0
Latest voting share	65.9%	34.1%		

=== Current members ===
District	Name	Party	Since	Residence	County
1	Nnamdi Chukwuocha	Democratic	2018	Wilmington	New Castle
2	Stephanie Bolden	Democratic	2010	Wilmington	New Castle
3	Josue Ortega	Democratic	2024	Wilmington	New Castle
4	Jeff Hilovsky	Republican	2022	Long Neck	Sussex
5	Kendra Johnson	Democratic	2018	New Castle	New Castle
6	Debra Heffernan	Democratic	2010	Wilmington	New Castle
7	Larry Lambert	Democratic	2020	Claymont	New Castle
8	Sherae'a Moore	Democratic	2020	Middletown	New Castle
9	Kevin Hensley	Republican	2014	Townsend	New Castle
10	Melanie Ross Levin	Democratic	2024	Wilmington	New Castle
11	Jeffrey Spiegelman	Republican	2012	Clayton	Kent, New Castle
12	Krista Griffith	Democratic	2018	Wilmington	New Castle
13	DeShanna Neal	Democratic	2022	Wilmington	New Castle
14	Claire Snyder-Hall	Democratic	2024	Rehoboth Beach	Sussex
15	Kamela Smith	Democratic	2024	Bear	New Castle
16	Franklin Cooke Jr.	Democratic	2018	Wilmington	New Castle
17	Melissa Minor-Brown	Democratic	2018	New Castle	New Castle
18	Sophie Phillips	Democratic	2022		New Castle
19	Kimberly Williams	Democratic	2012	Wilmington	New Castle
20	Stell Selby	Democratic	2022	Milton	Sussex
21	Frank Burns	Democratic	2024	Newark	New Castle
22	Michael Smith	Republican	2018	Newark	New Castle
23	Mara Gorman	Democratic	2012	Newark	New Castle
24	Edward Osienski	Democratic	2010	Newark	New Castle
25	Cyndie Romer	Democratic	2022	Newark	New Castle
26	Madinah Wilson-Anton	Democratic	2020	Newark	New Castle
27	Eric Morrison	Democratic	2020	Newark	New Castle
28	William Carson Jr.	Democratic	2007	Smyrna	Kent
29	William Bush IV	Democratic	2018	Camden	Kent
30	Shannon Morris	Republican	2018	Camden	Kent
31	Sean Lynn	Democratic	2014	Dover	Kent
32	Kerri Evelyn Harris	Democratic	2022	Dover	Kent
33	Charles Postles Jr.	Republican	2016	Milford	Kent
34	Lyndon Yearick	Republican	2014	Magnolia	Kent
35	Jesse Vanderwende	Republican	2018	Bridgeville	Sussex
36	Bryan Shupe	Republican	2018	Milford	Sussex
37	Valerie Jones Giltner	Republican	2024	Georgetown	Sussex
38	Ronald Gray	Republican	2012	Selbyville	Sussex
39	Daniel Short	Republican	2006	Seaford	Sussex
40	Timothy Dukes	Republican	2012	Laurel	Sussex
41	Richard Collins	Republican	2014	Millsboro	Sussex
