= 2020 Delaware House of Representatives election =

- November 3, 2020

All 41 seats in the Delaware House 21 seats needed for a majority
	Majority party	Minority party
Leader	Peter Schwartzkopf	Daniel Short
Party	Democratic	Republican
Leader's seat	14th-Rehoboth Beach	39th-Seaford
Last election	26	15
Seats after	26	15
Seat change	Steady	Steady
Popular vote	247,294	179,698
Percentage	57.83%	42.02%
- Results by district Democratic hold Republican hold
Speaker of the House before election
Peter Schwartzkopf
Democratic
Elected Speaker of the House
Peter Schwartzkopf
Democratic

The 2020 Delaware House of Representatives elections took place as part of the biennial 2020 United States elections. Delaware voters elected state representatives in all 41 districts. State representatives serve two-year terms in the Delaware House of Representatives. The election coincided with elections for other offices, including the presidency, U.S. Senate, U.S. House of Representatives, governor, and state senate. The primary election was held on September 15, 2020.

Following the previous election in 2018, Democrats retained control of the Delaware House with 26 seats to Republicans' 15 seats. To reclaim control of the chamber from Democrats, Republicans needed to net six House seats. Democrats retained control of the Delaware House following the 2020 general election, with the balance of power remaining unchanged: 26 Democrats to 15 Republicans.

== Predictions ==
Source	Ranking	As of
The Cook Political Report	Safe D	October 21, 2020

== Results summary ==
District	Incumbent	Party	Elected Representative	Party
1st	Nnamdi Chukwuocha	Dem	Nnamdi Chukwuocha	Dem
2nd	Stephanie Bolden	Dem	Stephanie Bolden	Dem
3rd	Sherry Dorsey Walker	Dem	Sherry Dorsey Walker	Dem
4th	Gerald Brady	Dem	Gerald Brady	Dem
5th	Kendra Johnson	Dem	Kendra Johnson	Dem
6th	Debra Heffernan	Dem	Debra Heffernan	Dem
7th	Ray Seigfried	Dem	Larry Lambert	Dem
8th	Quinn Johnson†	Dem	Sherae'a Moore	Dem
9th	Kevin Hensley	Rep	Kevin Hensley	Rep
10th	Sean Matthews	Dem	Sean Matthews	Dem
11th	Jeffrey Spiegelman	Rep	Jeffrey Spiegelman	Rep
12th	Krista Griffith	Dem	Krista Griffith	Dem
13th	Larry Mitchell	Dem	Larry Mitchell	Dem
14th	Peter Schwartzkopf	Dem	Peter Schwartzkopf	Dem
15th	Valerie Longhurst	Dem	Valerie Longhurst	Dem
16th	Franklin Cooke Jr.	Dem	Franklin Cooke Jr.	Dem
17th	Melissa Minor-Brown	Dem	Melissa Minor-Brown	Dem
18th	David Bentz	Dem	David Bentz	Dem
19th	Kimberly Williams	Dem	Kimberly Williams	Dem
20th	Stephen Smyk	Rep	Stephen Smyk	Rep
21st	Michael Ramone	Rep	Michael Ramone	Rep
22nd	Michael Smith	Rep	Michael Smith	Rep
23rd	Paul Baumbach	Dem	Paul Baumbach	Dem
24th	Edward Osienski	Dem	Edward Osienski	Dem
25th	John Kowlako Jr.	Dem	John Kowalko Jr.	Dem
26th	John Viola	Dem	Madinah Wilson-Anton	Dem
27th	Earl Jaques Jr.	Dem	Eric Morrison	Dem
28th	William Carson Jr.	Dem	William Carson Jr.	Dem
29th	William Bush IV	Dem	William Bush IV	Dem
30th	Shannon Morris	Rep	Shannon Morris	Rep
31st	Sean Lynn	Dem	Sean Lynn	Dem
32nd	Andria Bennett	Dem	Andria Bennett	Dem
33rd	Charles Postles Jr.	Rep	Charles Postles Jr.	Rep
34th	Lyndon Yearick	Rep	Lyndon Yearick	Rep
35th	Jesse Vanderwende	Rep	Jesse Vanderwende	Rep
36th	Bryan Shupe	Rep	Bryan Shupe	Rep
37th	Ruth Briggs King	Rep	Ruth Briggs King	Rep
38th	Ronald Gray	Rep	Ronald Gray	Rep
39th	Daniel Short	Rep	Daniel Short	Rep
40th	Timothy Dukes	Rep	Timothy Dukes	Rep
41st	Richard Collins	Rep	Richard Collins	Rep

† - Incumbent not seeking re-election

=== Statewide ===
Party	Candi- dates	Votes	%	Seats	+/–
Democratic	34	247,294	57.83%	26	Steady
Republican	26	179,698	42.02%	15	Steady
Libertarian	3	638	0.15%	0	Steady
Total	63	427,630	100%	41	Steady

=== Closest races ===
Seats where the margin of victory was under 10%:

1. District 9, 9.6%
2. District 21, 5.2%

=== Retiring incumbents ===
- Quinn Johnson (D-District 8)

=== Incumbents defeated in the primary election ===
- Ray Seigfried (D-District 7), defeated by Larry Lambert (D)
- John Viola (D-District 26), defeated by Madinah Wilson-Anton (D)
- Earl Jaques Jr. (D-District 27), defeated by Eric Morrison (D)

== Detailed results ==
Results of the 2020 Delaware House of Representatives election by district:

- Note: Delaware does not report results in uncompetitive primaries (i.e. races with only one candidate per party in the primary). Therefore, most districts do not include primary results.

=== District 1 ===
Incumbent Democrat Nnamdi Chukwuocha had represented the 1st district since 2018.

Delaware House of Representatives 1st district general election, 2020
Party	Candidate	Votes	%
Democratic	Nnamdi Chukwuocha (incumbent)	9,228	100%
Total votes		9,228	100%
Democratic hold			

=== District 2 ===
Incumbent Democrat Stephanie Bolden had represented the 2nd district since 2010.

Delaware House of Representatives 2nd district general election, 2020
Party	Candidate	Votes	%
Democratic	Stephanie Bolden (incumbent)	6,474	100%
Total votes		6,474	100%
Democratic hold			

=== District 3 ===
Incumbent Democrat Sherry Dorsey Walker had represented the 3rd district since 2018.

Delaware House of Representatives 3rd district general election, 2020
Party	Candidate	Votes	%
Democratic	Sherry Dorsey Walker (incumbent)	5,772	100%
Total votes		5,772	100%
Democratic hold			

=== District 4 ===
Incumbent Democrat Gerald Brady had represented the 4th district since 2006. Democratic primary

Delaware House of Representatives 4th district Democratic primary election, 2020
Party	Candidate	Votes	%
Democratic	Gerald Brady (incumbent)	3,004	61.57%
Democratic	Amy Solomon	1,875	38.43%
Total votes		4,879	100%

General election

Delaware House of Representatives 4th district general election, 2020
Party	Candidate	Votes	%
Democratic	Gerald Brady (incumbent)	9,330	70.02%
Republican	Jordan Nally	3,995	29.98%
Total votes		13,325	100%
Democratic hold			

=== District 5 ===
Incumbent Democrat Kendra Johnson had represented the 5th district since 2018.

Delaware House of Representatives 5th district general election, 2020
Party	Candidate	Votes	%
Democratic	Kendra Johnson (incumbent)	8,738	100%
Total votes		8,738	100%
Democratic hold			

=== District 6 ===
Incumbent Democrat Debra Heffernan had represented the 6th district since 2010.

Delaware House of Representatives 6th district general election, 2020
Party	Candidate	Votes	%
Democratic	Debra Heffernan (incumbent)	10,097	100%
Total votes		10,097	100%
Democratic hold			

=== District 7 ===
Incumbent Democrat Ray Seigfried had represented the 7th district since 2018. Seigfried lost re-nomination to fellow Democrat Larry Lambert, who went on to win the general election. Democratic primary

Delaware House of Representatives 7th district Democratic primary election, 2020
Party	Candidate	Votes	%
Democratic	Larry Lambert	2,148	58.95%
Democratic	Ray Seigfried (incumbent)	1,496	41.05%
Total votes		3,644	100%

General election

Delaware House of Representatives 7th district general election, 2020
Party	Candidate	Votes	%
Democratic	Larry Lambert	8,208	67.15%
Republican	James Haubrich	3,829	31.33%
Libertarian	Scott Gesty	186	1.52%
Total votes		12,223	100%
Democratic hold			

=== District 8 ===
Incumbent Democrat Quinn Johnson had represented the 8th district since 2008. Johnson did not seek re-election, and fellow Democrat Sherae'a Moore won the general election.

Delaware House of Representatives 8th district Democratic primary election, 2020
Party	Candidate	Votes	%
Democratic	Sherae'a Moore	1,292	41.80%
Democratic	Yvette Santiago	977	31.61%
Democratic	Matthew Powell	822	26.59%
Total votes		3,091	100%

Delaware House of Representatives 8th district general election, 2020
Party	Candidate	Votes	%
Democratic	Sherae'a Moore	7,567	56.97%
Republican	Daniel Zitofsky	5,715	43.03%
Total votes		13,282	100%
Democratic hold			

=== District 9 ===
Incumbent Republican Kevin Hensley had represented the 9th district since 2014.

Delaware House of Representatives 9th district general election, 2020
Party	Candidate	Votes	%
Republican	Kevin Hensley (incumbent)	9,812	54.80%
Democratic	Debbie Harrington	8,094	45.20%
Total votes		17,906	100%
Republican hold			

=== District 10 ===
Incumbent Democrat Sean Matthews had represented the 10th district since 2014. Democratic primary

Delaware House of Representatives 10th district Democratic primary election, 2020
Party	Candidate	Votes	%
Democratic	Sean Matthews (incumbent)	2,481	81.42%
Democratic	Keith James II	566	18.58%
Total votes		3,047	100%

General election

Delaware House of Representatives 10th district general election, 2020
Party	Candidate	Votes	%
Democratic	Sean Matthews (incumbent)	8,977	100%
Total votes		8,977	100%
Democratic hold			

=== District 11 ===
Incumbent Republican Jeffrey Spiegelman had represented the 11th district since 2012.

Delaware House of Representatives 11th district general election, 2020
Party	Candidate	Votes	%
Republican	Jeffrey Spiegelman (incumbent)	8,808	100%
Total votes		8,808	100%
Republican hold			

=== District 12 ===
Incumbent Democrat Krista Griffith had represented the 12th district since 2018.

Delaware House of Representatives 12th district general election, 2020
Party	Candidate	Votes	%
Democratic	Krista Griffith (incumbent)	9,259	59.96%
Republican	Jeffrey Cragg	6,183	40.04%
Total votes		15,442	100%
Democratic hold			

=== District 13 ===
Incumbent Democrat Larry Mitchell had represented the 13th district since 2006.

Delaware House of Representatives 13th district general election, 2020
Party	Candidate	Votes	%
Democratic	Larry Mitchell (incumbent)	7,546	100%
Total votes		7,546	100%
Democratic hold			

=== District 14 ===
Incumbent Democrat Speaker of the House Peter Schwartzkopf had represented the 14th district since 2002.

Delaware House of Representatives 14th district general election, 2020
Party	Candidate	Votes	%
Democratic	Peter Schwartzkopf (incumbent)	12,822	100%
Total votes		12,822	100%
Democratic hold			

=== District 15 ===
Incumbent Democrat and Majority Leader Valerie Longhurst had represented the 15th district since 2004.

Delaware House of Representatives 15th district general election, 2020
Party	Candidate	Votes	%
Democratic	Valerie Longhurst (incumbent)	9,112	67.85%
Republican	Michael Higgin	4,091	30.46%
Libertarian	Amy Merlino	227	1.69%
Total votes		13,430	100%
Democratic hold			

=== District 16 ===
Incumbent Democrat Franklin Cooke Jr. had represented the 16th district since 2018.

Delaware House of Representatives 16th district general election, 2020
Party	Candidate	Votes	%
Democratic	Franklin Cooke Jr. (incumbent)	7,679	100%
Total votes		7,679	100%
Democratic hold			

=== District 17 ===
Incumbent Democrat Melissa Minor-Brown had represented the 17th district since 2018.

Delaware House of Representatives 17th district general election, 2020
Party	Candidate	Votes	%
Democratic	Melissa Minor-Brown (incumbent)	8,001	100%
Total votes		8,001	100%
Democratic hold			

=== District 18 ===
Incumbent Democrat David Bentz had represented the 18th district since 2015.

Delaware House of Representatives 18th district general election, 2020
Party	Candidate	Votes	%
Democratic	David Bentz (incumbent)	7,772	100%
Total votes		7,772	100%
Democratic hold			

=== District 19 ===
Incumbent Democrat Kimberly Williams had represented the 19th district since 2012.

Delaware House of Representatives 19th district general election, 2020
Party	Candidate	Votes	%
Democratic	Kimberly Williams (incumbent)	7,374	100%
Total votes		7,374	100%
Democratic hold			

=== District 20 ===
Incumbent Republican Stephen Smyk had represented the 20th district since 2012.

Delaware House of Representatives 20th district general election, 2020
Party	Candidate	Votes	%
Republican	Stephen Smyk (incumbent)	12,883	100%
Total votes		12,883	100%
Republican hold			

=== District 21 ===
Incumbent Republican Michael Ramone had represented the 21st district since 2008.

Delaware House of Representatives 21st district general election, 2020
Party	Candidate	Votes	%
Republican	Michael Ramone (incumbent)	6,703	52.56%
Democratic	Stephanie Barry	6,051	47.44%
Total votes		12,754	100%
Republican hold			

=== District 22 ===
Incumbent Republican Michael Smith had represented the 22nd district since 2018.

Delaware House of Representatives 22nd district general election, 2020
Party	Candidate	Votes	%
Republican	Michael Smith (incumbent)	9,383	63.31%
Democratic	Luann D'Agostino	5,437	36.69%
Total votes		14,820	100%
Republican hold			

=== District 23 ===
Incumbent Democrat Paul Baumbach had represented the 23rd district since 2012.

Delaware House of Representatives 23rd district general election, 2020
Party	Candidate	Votes	%
Democratic	Paul Baumbach (incumbent)	6,783	100%
Total votes		6,783	100%
Democratic hold			

=== District 24 ===
Incumbent Democrat Edward Osienski had represented the 24th district since 2010.

Delaware House of Representatives 24th district general election, 2020
Party	Candidate	Votes	%
Democratic	Edward Osienski (incumbent)	7,181	70.17%
Republican	Gregory Wilps	3,052	29.83%
Total votes		10,233	100%
Democratic hold			

=== District 25 ===
Incumbent Democrat John Kowalko Jr. had represented the 25th district since 2006.

Delaware House of Representatives 25th district general election, 2020
Party	Candidate	Votes	%
Democratic	John Kowalko Jr. (incumbent)	6,041	100%
Total votes		6,041	100%
Democratic hold			

=== District 26 ===
Incumbent Democrat John Viola had represented the 26th district since 1998. Viola lost re-nomination to fellow Democrat Madinah Wilson-Anton, who went on to win the general election. Democratic primary

Delaware House of Representatives 26th district Democratic primary election, 2020
Party	Candidate	Votes	%
Democratic	Madinah Wilson-Anton	1,276	42.68%
Democratic	John Viola (incumbent)	1,233	41.24%
Democratic	Gabriel Olawale Adelagunja	481	16.09%
Total votes		2,990	100%

General election

Delaware House of Representatives 26th district general election, 2020
Party	Candidate	Votes	%
Democratic	Madinah Wilson-Anton	6,933	71.57%
Republican	Timothy S. Conrad	2,754	28.43%
Total votes		9,687	100%
Democratic hold			

=== District 27 ===
Incumbent Democrat Earl Jaques Jr. had represented the 27th district since 2008. Jaques lost re-nomination to fellow Democrat Eric Morrison, who went on to win the general election. Democratic primary

Delaware House of Representatives 27th district Democratic primary election, 2020
Party	Candidate	Votes	%
Democratic	Eric Morrison	2,137	61.13%
Democratic	Earl Jaques Jr. (incumbent)	1,359	38.87%
Total votes		3,496	100%

General election

Delaware House of Representatives 27th district general election, 2020
Party	Candidate	Votes	%
Democratic	Eric Morrison	7,847	61.44%
Republican	Donald Carl "Tripp" Keister III	4,700	36.80%
Libertarian	William Hinds	225	1.76%
Total votes		12,772	100%
Democratic hold			

=== District 28 ===
Incumbent Democrat William Carson Jr. had represented the 28th district since 2008.

Delaware House of Representatives 28th district general election, 2020
Party	Candidate	Votes	%
Democratic	William Carson Jr. (incumbent)	8,167	100%
Total votes		8,167	100%
Democratic hold			

=== District 29 ===
Incumbent Democrat William Bush IV had represented the 29th district since 2018.

Delaware House of Representatives 29th district general election, 2020
Party	Candidate	Votes	%
Democratic	William Bush IV (incumbent)	7,687	55.83%
Republican	Robin Hayes	6,081	44.17%
Total votes		13,768	100%
Democratic hold			

=== District 30 ===
Incumbent Republican Shannon Morris had represented the 30th district since 2018.

Delaware House of Representatives 30th district general election, 2020
Party	Candidate	Votes	%
Republican	Shannon Morris (incumbent)	7,105	68.10%
Democratic	Chuck Groce	3,328	31.90%
Total votes		10,433	100%
Republican hold			

=== District 31 ===
Incumbent Democrat Sean Lynn had represented the 31st district since 2014.

Delaware House of Representatives 31st district general election, 2020
Party	Candidate	Votes	%
Democratic	Sean Lynn (incumbent)	6,889	69.21%
Republican	Richard Harpster	3,065	30.79%
Total votes		9,954	100%
Democratic hold			

=== District 32 ===
Incumbent Democrat Andria Bennett had represented the 32nd district since 2012.

Delaware House of Representatives 32nd district general election, 2020
Party	Candidate	Votes	%
Democratic	Andria Bennett (incumbent)	5,291	63.22%
Republican	Cheryl Precourt	3,078	36.78%
Total votes		8,369	100%
Democratic hold			

=== District 33 ===
Incumbent Republican Charles Postles Jr. had represented the 33rd district since 2016.

Delaware House of Representatives 33rd district general election, 2020
Party	Candidate	Votes	%
Republican	Charles Postles Jr. (incumbent)	6,813	58.46%
Democratic	Rachael King	4,841	41.54%
Total votes		11,654	100%
Republican hold			

=== District 34 ===
Incumbent Republican Lyndon Yearick had represented the 34th district since 2014. Democratic primary

Delaware House of Representatives 34th district Democratic primary election, 2020
Party	Candidate	Votes	%
Democratic	Adewunmi Kuforiji	1,298	53.77%
Democratic	Bob Haynes	1,116	46.23%
Total votes		2,414	100%

General election

Delaware House of Representatives 34th district general election, 2020
Party	Candidate	Votes	%
Republican	Lyndon Yearick (incumbent)	7,350	57.32%
Democratic	Adewunmi Kuforiji	5,472	42.68%
Total votes		12,822	100%
Republican hold			

=== District 35 ===
Incumbent Republican Jesse Vanderwende had represented the 35th district since 2018.

Delaware House of Representatives 35th district general election, 2020
Party	Candidate	Votes	%
Republican	Jesse Vanderwende (incumbent)	7,093	68.56%
Democratic	Darrynn Harris	3,253	31.44%
Total votes		10,346	100%
Republican hold			

=== District 36 ===
Incumbent Republican Bryan Shupe had represented the 36th district since 2018.

Delaware House of Representatives 36th district general election, 2020
Party	Candidate	Votes	%
Republican	Bryan Shupe (incumbent)	7,099	63.71%
Democratic	Greg Fuller	4,043	36.29%
Total votes		11,142	100%
Republican hold			

=== District 37 ===
Incumbent Republican Ruth Briggs King had represented the 37th district since 2010.

Delaware House of Representatives 37th district general election, 2020
Party	Candidate	Votes	%
Republican	Ruth Briggs King (incumbent)	9,760	100%
Total votes		9,760	100%
Republican hold			

=== District 38 ===
Incumbent Republican Ronald Gray had represented the 38th district since 2012.

Delaware House of Representatives 38th district general election, 2020
Party	Candidate	Votes	%
Republican	Ronald Gray (incumbent)	15,409	100%
Total votes		15,409	100%
Republican hold			

=== District 39 ===
Incumbent Republican and Minority Leader Daniel Short had represented the 39th district since 2006.

Delaware House of Representatives 39th district general election, 2020
Party	Candidate	Votes	%
Republican	Daniel Short (incumbent)	7,420	100%
Total votes		7,420	100%
Republican hold			

=== District 40 ===
Incumbent Republican Timothy Dukes had represented the 40th district since 2012.

Delaware House of Representatives 40th district general election, 2020
Party	Candidate	Votes	%
Republican	Timothy Dukes (incumbent)	8,534	100%
Total votes		8,534	100%
Republican hold			

=== District 41 ===
Incumbent Republican Richard Collins had represented the 41st district since 2014.

Delaware House of Representatives 41st district general election, 2020
Party	Candidate	Votes	%
Republican	Richard Collins (incumbent)	8,983	100%
Total votes		8,983	100%
Republican hold			

== See also ==
- 2020 United States elections
