= Delaware Democratic Party =

Delaware affiliate of the Democratic Party

- Chairperson: Evelyn Brady
- Governor: Matt Meyer
- Lieutenant Governor: Kyle Evans Gay
- Speaker of the House: Melissa Minor-Brown
- Senate President Pro Tempore: David Sokola
- House Majority Leader: Kerri Evelyn Harris
- Headquarters: New Castle, Delaware
- Membership (2021): ▲362,181
- Ideology: Majority: Modern liberalism Factions: Centrism; Progressivism
- National affiliation: Democratic Party
- Colors: Blue
- Delaware Senate: 15 / 21
- Delaware House of Representatives: 27 / 41
- Statewide Executive Offices: 6 / 6
- United States Senate: 2 / 2
- United States House of Representatives: 1 / 1
- County Councils: 16 / 24

Election symbol

Website
- www.deldems.org

The Delaware Democratic Party (DelDems) is the affiliate of the Democratic Party in the U.S. state of Delaware. It is headquartered in New Castle County and chaired by Evelyn Brady.

The party is the dominant political party in Delaware and has existed since the Jacksonian Democrats broke away from the Federalists in 1825. Former U.S. President Joe Biden is a Delaware Democrat, having served as a U.S. Senator from the state from 1973 to 2009, when he was inaugurated as vice president. The party also occupies all seats for the state in Congress, all statewide executive offices, and majorities in both houses of the state legislature. Historically a more centrist affiliate of the Democratic Party, the state party has recently become more progressive due to the movement's recent electoral successes against the centrist wing of the party.

== History ==
=== Party creation ===
As the first state to ratify the United States Constitution, Delaware was at the forefront of the creation in U.S. political parties. The origins of the Delaware Democratic Party can be traced back to the original anti-federalist party. While key difference divide this part from the Democratic Party today, key issues involving government involvement and ideologies such as Jeffersonian and Jacksonian can be linked to modern day ideals of the Delaware Democratic party. Despite being one of the first states with true parties, the spiritual predecessor of the Democratic party struggled to support its agenda in the state. It wasn't until the splitting of parties into federalists and Jacksonians that the Democratic party got its first true start. With only one bad loss in 1855 to the American Party, the Democratic Party dominated politics up until the end of Reconstruction in the United States. Most fascinating of all, was how the party maintained its popularity during the Civil War. Despite being a northern state, Delaware Democrats opposed the abolition of slavery and named themselves "the white man's party" as they fought the Republican congress during Reconstruction. With 36 years of election dominance, the Democrats eventually fell out of power due to the growth of industry in the state.

=== 1900s-1940s ===
Following the ousting of the Democrats in both the federal and state sector, the Republican Party remained the dominant party throughout the early 1900s and up until World War II. Even when J. Edward Addicks attempted to illegally purchase the Republican seat in the U.S. Senate, the Democrats were unable to capitalize. From 1897 to 1936, Delaware Democrats held little power in politics with Republicans either dominating the state senate and house of Representatives, or the Democrats completely absent from federal politics. With the power of industry overriding agriculture, the Democratic Party was not able to regain an equal footing in the state until Franklin D. Roosevelt came into office.

=== 1950s-1990s ===
Following its period of weakness, the Democratic Party of Delaware began to regain an equal foothold with its Republican rival following World War II. Democrat Elbert N. Carvel served two terms as the governor of the state and helped keep his party relevant when they did not control the state legislature. The Democrats of the late 1970s to 2000 held an equal footing in the state, neither party gaining serious ground on the other. Democrats would end up holding the Governor position in the state for 30 years.

=== 2000s-present ===
==== Initial regaining of power (2000s-mid 2010s) ====
In the 21st century, the Democratic Party has risen to become the most popular party in Delaware. The party has control at the state level over the executive branch and the legislative branch. In 2000, incumbent Democratic Governor Tom Carper defeated Delaware's last Republican United States Senator to date, William Roth, by a 12-point margin. Incumbent Republican United States Representative Mike Castle retired in 2010 to run for U.S. Senate. The seat switched from Republican to Democratic when then-Lieutenant Governor John Carney won the seat that year, which was one of three congressional seats that Democrats gained in 2010.

==== Progressive movement and ideological factions (late 2010s-present) ====
Preceding the late-2010s, the progressive faction of the Democratic Party held little power in Delaware politics, with the party being primarily dominated by the centrist and conservative wings. In 2018, incumbent centrist U.S. Senator Tom Carper faced an unexpected progressive primary challenge from Dover activist Kerri Evelyn Harris, who received 35 percent of the vote, which was the highest percentage against a statewide incumbent in 20 years.

In the 2020 state Democratic primaries, the progressive movement made unexpected significant gains on the state and local level. The most powerful Democrat in the Delaware Senate, President Pro Tempore David McBride, lost to progressive challenger Marie Pinkney by nearly 5 points. Among other notable wins was progressive Eric Morrison's 22-point landslide defeat of conservative Democratic incumbent state representative Earl Jaques Jr., who faced controversy over homophobic comments he made towards Morrison, who is gay. Other progressive insurgents in the Delaware legislature in the 2020 primaries included Larry Lambert and Madinah Wilson-Anton. Progressive incumbent County Executive of New Castle County Matt Meyer also defeated his significantly funded centrist challenger by 13 points.

Following the progressive gains in the 2020 elections, bills advanced by the progressive faction to raise the Delaware minimum wage to $15 an hour, and the legalization of recreational marijuana were passed through the state legislature. Governor John Carney signed the $15/hour minimum wage bill, but vetoed the legalization of recreational marijuana, for which he was heavily criticized by fellow Democrats. Progressive County Executive Matt Meyer wrote an open letter to the Delaware legislature encouraging them to override Carney's veto.

During Carney's governorship, the progressive movement has managed to pressure more typically centrist Democrats to more liberal policy positions, mainly in reaction to Carney's comparatively conservative stances. Delaware Lieutenant Governor Bethany Hall-Long came out in support of legalizing recreational marijuana following Carney's veto announcement. Carney ultimately allowed marijuana to be legalized in Delaware in 2023, when a second round of legalization bills came to his desk, and he neither signed nor vetoed it.

Further criticism of Carney's stances by the progressive wing of the party have been for his support for capital punishment in certain cases. Attorney General Kathy Jennings stated that if the death penalty was reinstated in Delaware, she would refuse to enforce it. 72 percent of Delaware Democratic voters oppose capital punishment. In June 2024, both the Delaware House and Senate passed a bill pushed by progressives to abolish the death penalty in statute. In September 2024, Carney signed the bill, seemingly backtracking his previous stance.

In the 2022 elections, progressive former U.S. Senate candidate Kerri Evelyn Harris won a seat to the Delaware House of Representatives.

In April 2024, the Delaware House of Representatives passed a bill to legalize physician-assisted suicide for those with terminal illnesses, a priority of the progressive faction of Delaware Democrats. In June 2024, the Delaware Senate passed the bill. In September 2024, John Carney vetoed the bill, drawing criticism from Democratic legislators and Democratic nominee for Governor Matt Meyer. In 2025, the bill was re-introduced by progressive Eric Morrison, passed in both chambers, and signed by now-Governor Meyer.

In the 2024 state Democratic primaries, progressive Democrats once again made significant victories. Among them were incumbent Delaware Speaker of the House Valerie Longhurst being defeated by her progressive challenger Kamela Smith, and incumbent County Executive Matt Meyer defeating incumbent Lieutenant Governor Bethany Hall-Long for the governor's nomination.

In the 2026 Democratic primaries, progressive Democrats gained multiple wins across the state, with Delaware Democratic Socialists of America-endorsed challenger Shay Frisby defeating incumbent state senator Ray Seigfried, and state representatives Franklin Cooke Jr., William Carson Jr., Stephanie Bolden, and Josue Ortega also losing their primaries to progressive challengers.

== Current elected officials ==
The following is a list of elected statewide and federal Democratic officeholders beginning in 2019:

=== Members of Congress ===
Democrats comprise all of Delaware's three-member Congressional delegation; this includes both US Senators and the lone member of the House of Representatives.

==== U.S. Senate ====
Democrats have controlled both of Delaware's seats in the U.S. Senate since 2000:

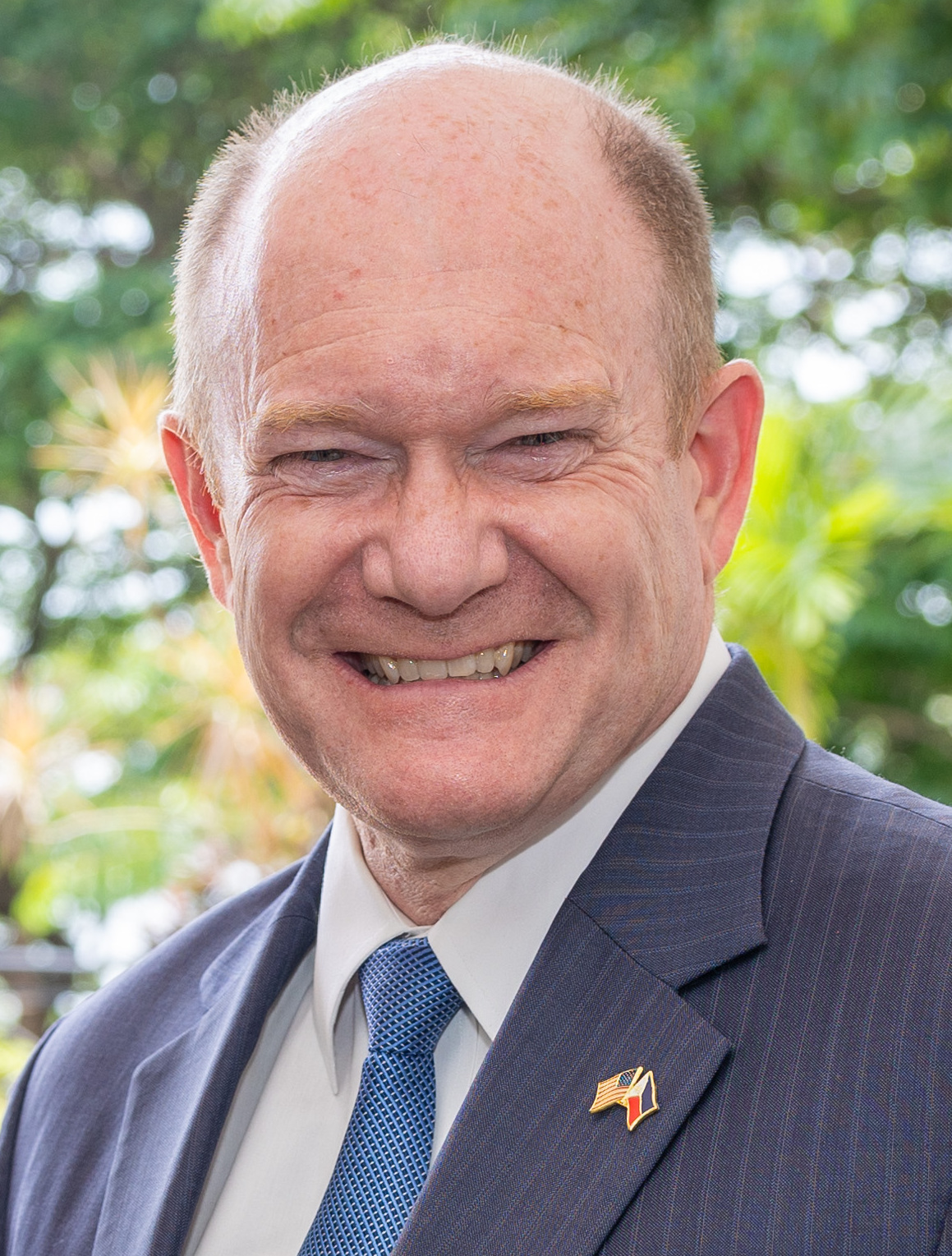
Senior U.S. Senator Chris Coons

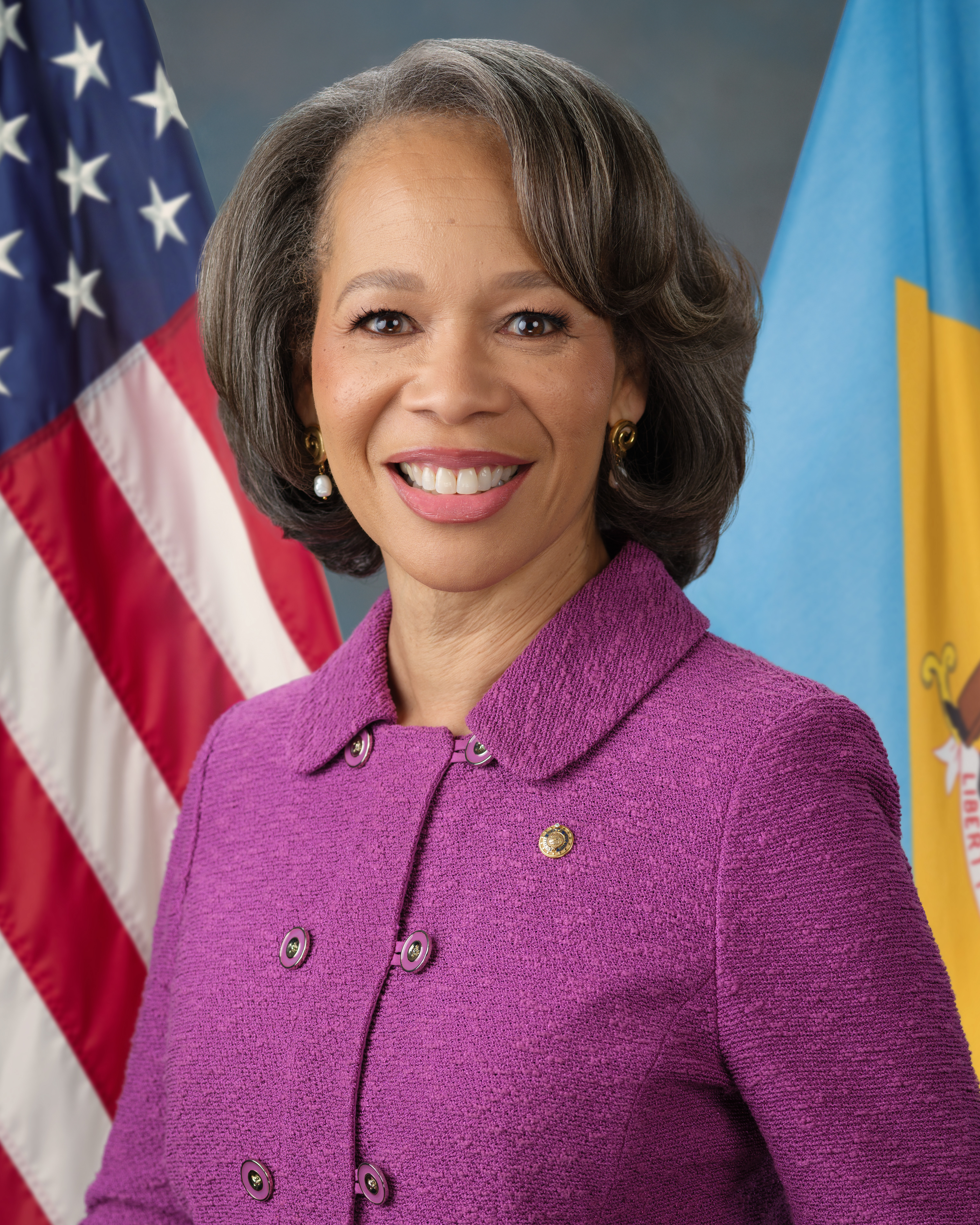
Junior U.S. Senator Lisa Blunt Rochester

==== U.S. House of Representatives ====
Democrats have controlled Delaware's lone seat in the U.S. House of Representatives since 2010:

District	Member	Photo
At-large	Sarah McBride	

=== Statewide officials ===
Democrats control all six statewide elected offices.

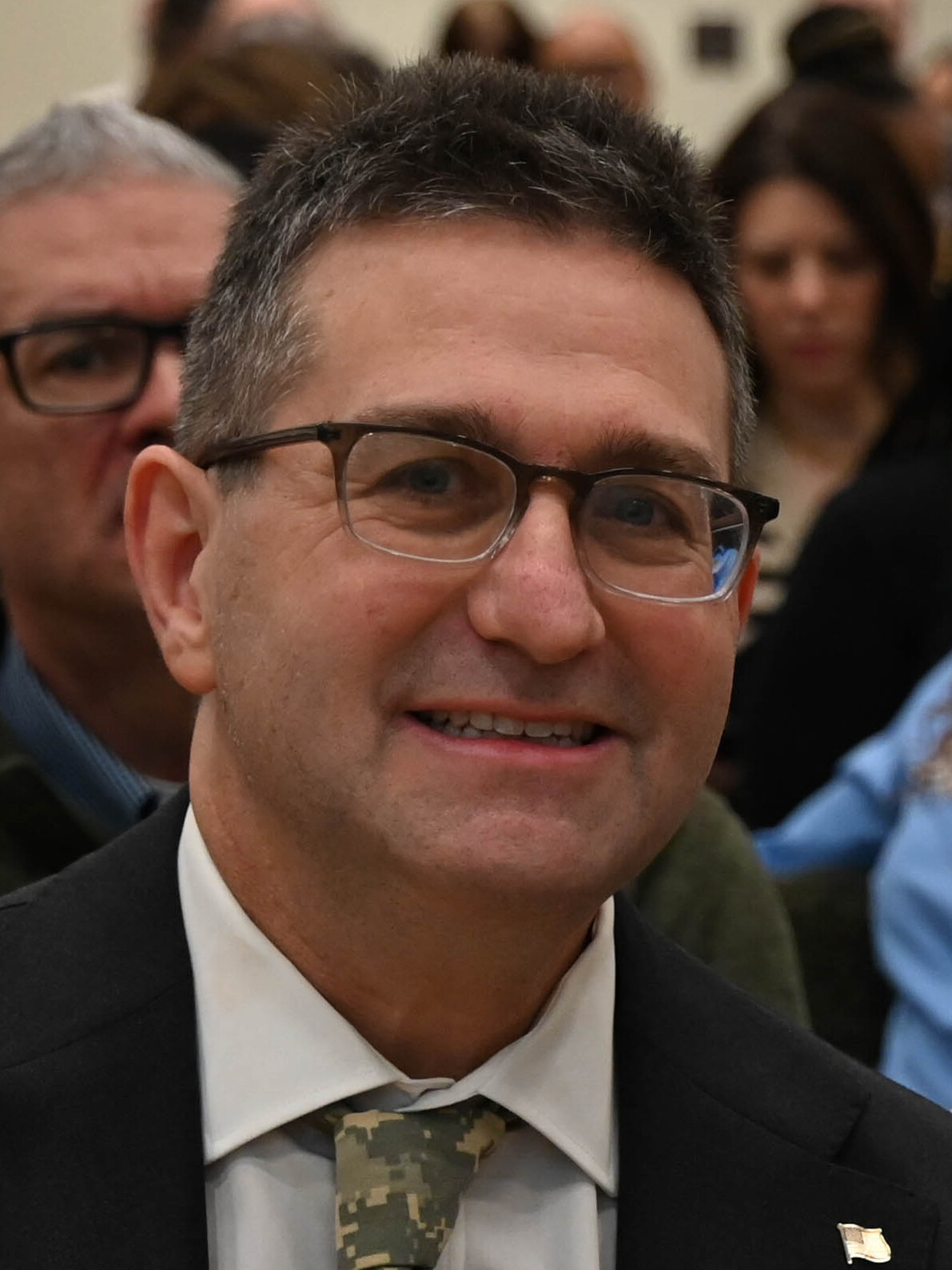
Governor Matt Meyer

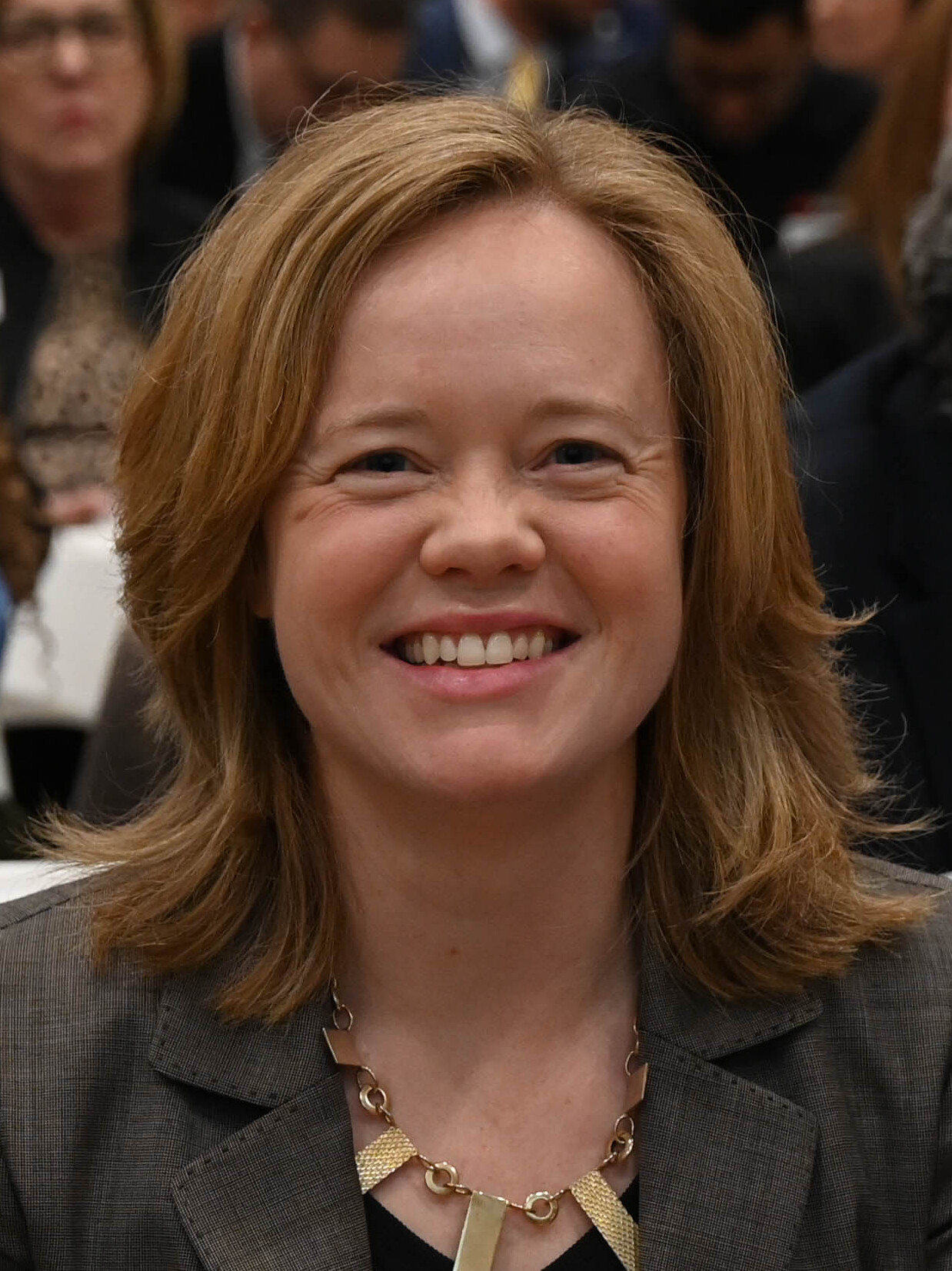
Lieutenant Governor Kyle Evans Gay

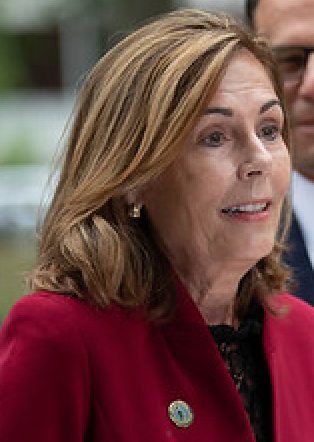
Attorney General Kathy Jennings
- Treasurer: Colleen Davis
- Auditor: Lydia York
- Commissioner of Insurance: Trinidad Navarro

=== State legislative leaders ===
- Senate President: Kyle Evans Gay
  - Senate President Pro Tempore: David Sokola
  - Senate Majority Leader: Bryan Townsend
- Speaker of the House: Melissa Minor-Brown
  - House Majority Leader: Kerri Evelyn Harris

=== Municipal ===
The following Democrats hold prominent mayoralties in Delaware:

- Wilmington, Delaware: John Carney (1)
- Dover, Delaware: Robin Christiansen (2)

== Federal executive officials ==
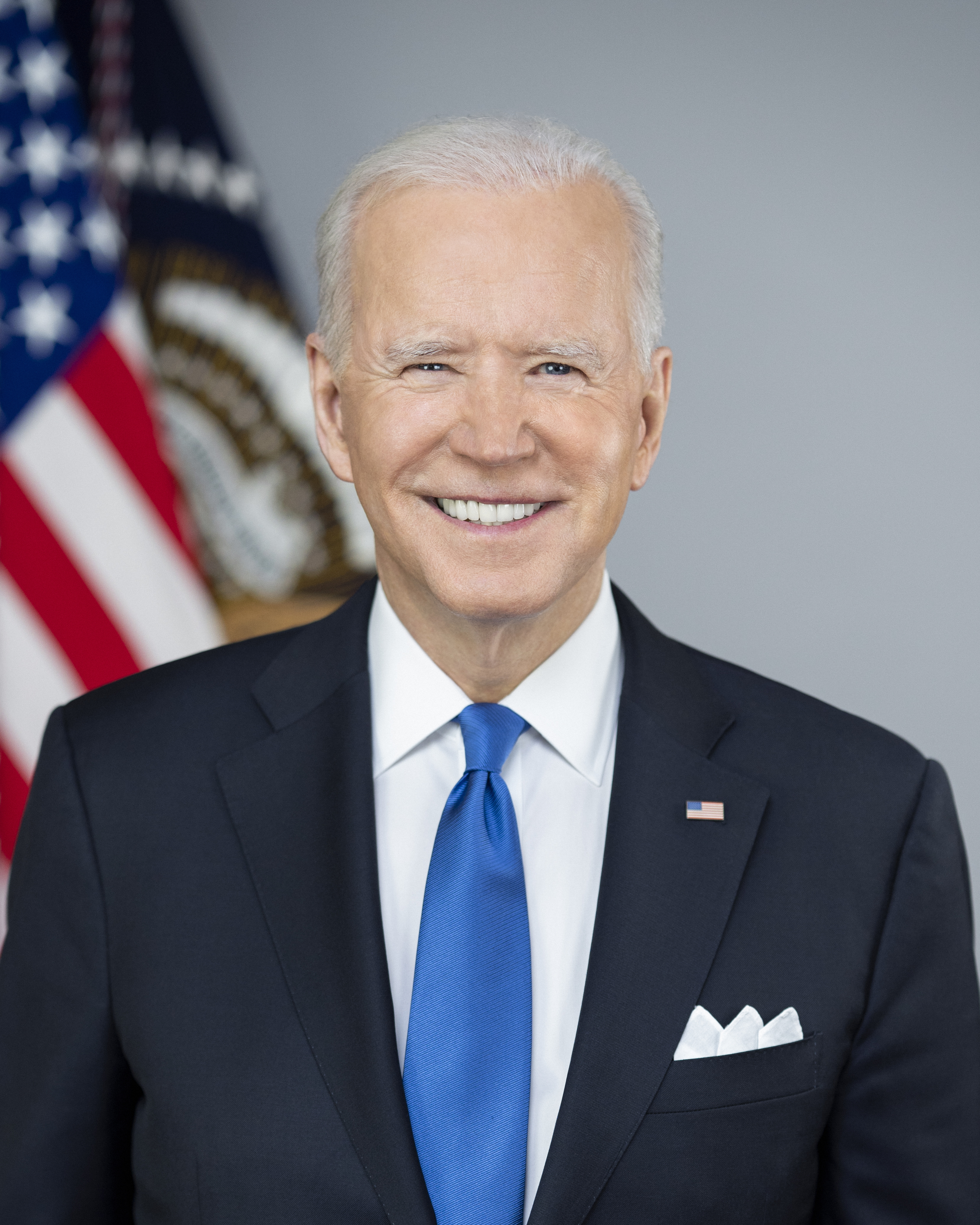
President, former Vice President and former Delaware Senator Joe Biden

In the 2008 U.S. presidential election, Senator Joe Biden was elected Vice President of the United States alongside Illinois Senator Barack Obama, who was elected President of the United States. Biden is the first Delawarean to run on a presidential ticket, and the first Delawarean to be elected and hold the office. Biden assumed the Vice Presidency on January 20, 2009, and served until January 20, 2017.

In the 2020 U.S. presidential election, Joe Biden was elected President of the United States alongside California Senator Kamala Harris, who was elected Vice President of the United States. He is the first Delawarean to be elected to the office of the President. He was sworn in on January 20, 2021.

== Presidential electoral history ==
Delaware voted for Democrats in the following elections:

- 1852 - Former U.S. Senator Franklin Pierce
- 1856 - Former U.S. Ambassador James Buchanan
- 1864 - Former General George B. McClellan
- 1868 - Former New York Governor Horatio Seymour
- 1876 - New York Governor Samuel J. Tilden
- 1880 - General Winfield Scott Hancock
- 1884 - New York Governor Grover Cleveland
- 1888 - Incumbent U.S. President Grover Cleveland
- 1892 - Former U.S. President Grover Cleveland
- 1912 - New Jersey Governor Woodrow Wilson
- 1936 - Incumbent U.S. President Franklin D. Roosevelt
- 1940 - Incumbent U.S. President Franklin D. Roosevelt
- 1944 - Incumbent U.S. President Franklin D. Roosevelt
- 1960 - U.S. Senator John F. Kennedy
- 1964 - Incumbent U.S. President Lyndon B. Johnson
- 1976 - Former Georgia Governor Jimmy Carter
- 1992 - Arkansas Governor Bill Clinton
- 1996 - Incumbent U.S. President Bill Clinton
- 2000 - U.S. Vice President Al Gore
- 2004 - U.S. Senator John Kerry
- 2008 - U.S. Senator Barack Obama
- 2012 - Incumbent U.S. President Barack Obama
- 2016 - Former U.S. Secretary of State Hillary Clinton
- 2020 - Former U.S. Vice President Joe Biden
- 2024 - U.S. Vice President Kamala Harris

== Election results ==
=== Federal ===
==== U.S. House ====
Election	Votes	%	Seats (DE)	±
2016	233,554	55.52	1 / 1	0
2018	227,353	64.26	1 / 1	0
2020	281,382	57.63	1 / 1	0
2022	178,416	55.47	1 / 1	0
2024	287,830	57.86	1 / 1	0
2026	243,687	64.35	1 / 1	0

=== State ===
==== Executive offices ====
Governor
Election	Candidate	Votes	%	Result
1952	Elbert N. Carvel	81,772	47.89%	Lost ✗
1956	James Hoge Tyler McConnell	85,047	48.05%	Lost ✗
1960	Elbert N. Carvel	100,792	51.73%	Won ✓
1964	Charles L. Terry Jr.	102,797	51.35%	Won ✓
1968	Charles L. Terry Jr.	102,360	49.49%	Lost ✗
1972	Sherman W. Tribbitt	117,274	51.27%	Won ✓
1976	Sherman W. Tribbitt	97,480	42.46%	Lost ✗
1980	William J. Gordy	64,217	28.54%	Lost ✗
1984	William T. Quillen	108,315	44.47%	Lost ✗
1988	Jacob Kreshtool/Gary E. Hindes	70,236	29.27%	Lost ✗
1992	Tom Carper/Ruth Ann Minner	179,365	64.74%	Won ✓
1996	Tom Carper/Ruth Ann Minner	188,300	69.50%	Won ✓
2000	Ruth Ann Minner	191,695	59.24%	Won ✓
2004	Ruth Ann Minner	185,548	50.87%	Won ✓
2008	Jack Markell	266,861	60.52%	Won ✓
2012	Jack Markell	275,993	69.34%	Won ✓
2016	John Carney	248,404	58.34%	Won ✓
2020	John Carney	292,903	59.46%	Won ✓
2024	Matt Meyer	279,585	56.07%	Won ✓

== See also ==
- Political party strength in Delaware
- Delaware State Capitol
- Delaware General Assembly
- Delaware House of Representatives
- Delaware Senate
