= 2026 Delaware Senate election =

- November 3, 2026

11 of the 21 seats in the Delaware Senate 11 seats needed for a majority

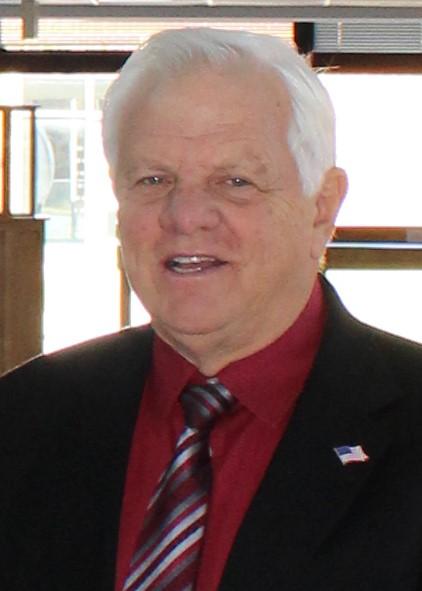
Leader	David Sokola (retiring)	Gerald Hocker
Party	Democratic	Republican
Leader since	November 4, 2020	November 7, 2018
Leader's seat	8th - Newark	20th - Ocean View
Last election	15	6
Current seats	15	6
Seats needed	Steady	▲5
- Democratic incumbent Democratic incumbent retiring Republican incumbent Republican incumbent retiring
Incumbent President pro tempore
David Sokola
Democratic

The 2026 Delaware Senate election was held on November 3, 2026, alongside the 2026 United States elections.

== Retirements ==
=== Democrats ===
1. District 8: David Sokola is retiring.

=== Republicans ===
1. District 15: David G. Lawson is retiring.

== Predictions ==
Source	Ranking	As of
Sabato's Crystal Ball	Safe D	October 16, 2026
State Navigate	Safe D	October 14, 2026

== Summary of results by district ==
District	2024 Pres.	Incumbent	Party	Elected Senator	Outcome
1st	D+46.6	Dan Cruce	Dem	Dan Cruce	Dem
5th	D+31.8	Ray Seigfried	Dem	Shay Frisby	Dem
7th	D+17.7	Spiros Mantzavinos	Dem	Spiros Mantzavinos	Dem
8th	D+27.5	David Sokola	Dem	Mara Gorman	Dem
9th	D+23.9	Jack Walsh	Dem	Jack Walsh	Dem
12th	D+25.6	Nicole Poore	Dem	Nicole Poore	Dem
13th	D+47.7	Marie Pinkney	Dem	Marie Pinkney	Dem
14th	D+11.7	Kyra Hoffner	Dem	Kyra Hoffner	Dem
15th	R+27.7	David G. Lawson	Rep	Emily A. Thompson	Rep
19th	R+11.9	Brian G. Pettyjohn	Rep	Brian G. Pettyjohn	Rep
20th	R+15.2	Gerald Hocker	Rep	Gerald Hocker	Rep

== Results ==
=== 1st District ===
==== Democratic primary ====
===== Candidates =====
- Adriana Leela Bohm, professor
- Dan Cruce, incumbent state senator

===== Endorsements =====
Adriana Leela Bohm

U.S. senators

- Bernie Sanders, Vermont (2007–present)

Statewide officials

- Matt Meyer, governor of Delaware (2025–present)

Organizations

- Delaware Working Families Party

===== Results =====
Precinct results Cruce: 50–60%; 60–70%; 70–80%; >90%; Bohm: 50–60%; 60–70%; >90%; Tie: 50%

2026 Delaware Senate 1st district Democratic primary election
Party	Candidate	Votes	%
Democratic	Dan Cruce (incumbent)	3,957	50.94
Democratic	Adriana Leela Bohm	3,811	49.06
Total votes		7,768	100.0

=== 5th District ===
==== Democratic primary ====
===== Candidates =====
- Shay Frisby, state social services supervisor
- Raymond Seigfried, incumbent state senator

===== Endorsements =====
Shay Frisby

U.S. senators

- Bernie Sanders, Vermont (2007–present)

Statewide officials

- Matt Meyer, governor of Delaware (2025–present)

Organizations

- Delaware Working Families Party

===== Results =====
Precinct results Frisby: 50–60%; 60–70%; 70–80%; Seigfried: 50–60%; >90%

2026 Delaware 5th district Democratic primary election
Party	Candidate	Votes	%
Democratic	Shay Frisby	3,059	58.38
Democratic	Raymond Seigfried (incumbent)	2,181	41.62
Total votes		5,240	100.0

=== 7th District ===
==== Democratic primary ====
===== Candidates =====
- Jose Lopez, small business owner
- Spiros Mantzavinos, incumbent state senator

===== Results =====
Precinct results Mantzavinos: 50–60%; 60–70%; 70–80%; 80–90%; Lopez: 70–80%

2026 Delaware 7th district Democratic primary election
Party	Candidate	Votes	%
Democratic	Spiros Mantzavinos (incumbent)	2,326	66.1
Democratic	Jose Lopez	1,193	33.9
Total votes		3,519	100.0

=== 8th District ===
==== Democratic primary ====
===== Candidates =====
====== Declared ======
- Mara Gorman, state representative from the 23rd district (2024-present)

====== Declined ======
- David Sokola, incumbent senator

=== 9th District ===
==== Democratic primary ====
===== Candidates =====
- Dawn Briggs, certified public accountant
- Jack Walsh, incumbent state senator

===== Results =====
2026 Delaware 9th district Democratic primary election
Party	Candidate	Votes	%
Democratic	Jack Walsh (incumbent)	2,123	75.77
Democratic	Dawn Briggs	679	24.23
Total votes			

=== 12th District ===
==== Democratic primary ====
===== Candidates =====
- Nicole Poore, incumbent state senator
- Keonna Watson, nonprofit leader

===== Results =====
Precinct results Poore: 50–60%; 60–70%; Watson: 50–60%; 60–70%

2026 Delaware 12th district Democratic primary election
Party	Candidate	Votes	%
Democratic	Nicole Poore (incumbent)	2,828	53.15
Democratic	Keonna Watson	2,493	46.85
Total votes		5,321	100.0

=== 14th District ===
==== Candidates ====
- Kyra Hoffner, incumbent state senator
- Christopher Beardsley, former United States Housing and Urban Development Department employee

==== Results ====
2026 Delaware 14th district Democratic primary election
Party	Candidate	Votes	%
Democratic	Kyra Hoffner (incumbent)	3,226	73.7
Democratic	Christopher Beardsley	1,151	26.3
Total votes			

=== 15th District ===
==== Republican primary ====
===== Candidates =====
====== Declared ======
- Elizabeth Thompson, Delaware Division of Public Health program manager

====== Declined ======
- David G. Lawson, incumbent senator

===== Endorsements =====
Elizabeth Thompson

State legislators

- David G. Lawson, incumbent senator

==== Democratic primary ====
===== Candidates =====
====== Declared ======
- Nisha Lodhavia, member of the University of Delaware board of trustees

===== Endorsements =====
Nisha Lodhavia

Statewide officials

- Matt Meyer, governor of Delaware (2025–present)
