= Stell Parker Selby =

American politician

Member of the Delaware House of Representatives from the 20th district
- In office November 2022 – June 24, 2025
- Preceded by: Stephen Smyk
- Succeeded by: Alonna Berry

Personal details
- Born: Esthelda Ramona Parker Selby Milford, Delaware, U.S.
- Party: Democratic
- Other political affiliations: Republican (before 2016)
- Education: Delaware State University (BA); University of Delaware (MEd)
- Website: Legislature website Campaign website

Esthelda Ramona Parker Selby is an American politician and educator who served in the Delaware House of Representatives for the 20th district from 2022 until her resignation in 2025. Prior to her election, Parker Selby worked as a teacher and academic administrator in the Cape Henlopen School District, then served on the Cape Henlopen School Board and on the Milton city council. She resigned following a longterm absence after suffering from a stroke in 2024.

== Early life and education ==
Parker Selby was born in Milford and raised in Lewes, the daughter of the late Violet Ramona Parker and the late Denver B. Parker. She attended elementary school at the segregated Milton School #196-C, and high school at the William C. Jason Comprehensive High School in Georgetown, Delaware. Upon graduation, Parker Selby attended Delaware State University, where she received her Bachelor of Arts in sociology with a minor in education, then later earned a Master of Education at the University of Delaware in Education and Public-School Administration.

== Career ==
Parker Selby working for 34 years in education at the time of her retirement. During her tenure, she worked as principal at Rehoboth Elementary as well as assistant principal and teacher at Cape Henlopen High School.

In 2019, Governor John Carney appointed Parker Selby to the Delaware State University Board of Trustees.

=== Political campaigns ===
In 2002, she ran as a Republican for the Delaware State Senate against incumbent Democrat Thurman Adams Jr., losing with 36.36% of the vote.

In 2005, she was elected to the Cape Henlopen School District Board of Education, serving until 2010.

In 2006, she was the Republican nominee for State Treasurer against incumbent Democrat Jack Markell, losing in a landslide with 29.5% of the vote. Her nomination made her the first African American woman to run for statewide office in Delaware's history.

In 2013, she was appointed to the city council of Milton by mayor Marion Jones. She was elected to the office in 2014 and later served as vice mayor.

== Delaware House of Representatives ==
Parker Selby ran for the Delaware House of Representatives in 2022 for the 20th district, where Republican incumbent Stephen Smyk was retiring to run for Delaware State Senate. Although Parker Selby ran as a Republican in the early 2000s, she left the party before the first election of Donald Trump and ran as a Democrat. In the general election, she narrowly defeated Republican candidate Dallas Wingate with 51% of the vote. Her election made her the first African American to represent South Delaware in the Delaware General Assembly.

She defeated Republican candidate Nikki Miller in the 2024 election with 50.7% of the vote.

=== Health problems and resignation ===
In January 2025, Parker Selby suffered an unknown medical event— later revealed to be a stroke— and sent a letter to the legislature stating she was in recovery. She was officially sworn in for her second term on March 24. By mid-May, with 13 days left of the year's legislative session, she had not yet attended any legislative meetings.

On May 16, the Cape Gazette published an editorial calling for Parker Selby to resign and have a new member elected, stating "If Parker Selby is unable to fulfill the duties of her office for an entire legislative session, it’s time to hold a special election." By June, numerous Republican representatives including Minority Leader Timothy Dukes and Democratic representative Madinah Wilson-Anton called on Parker Selby to resign. Speaker Melissa Minor-Brown denied allegations of covering up Parker Selby's status and noted that she was unable to call a special election until Parker Selby resigned, as she had no legal means to remove her from the position.

On June 24, Parker Selby announced that she would resign her seat effective immediately.

== Electoral history ==
=== 2024 ===
2024 Delaware House of Representatives election, 20th district
| Party | Candidate | Votes | % |
|---|---|---|---|
| Democratic | Stell Parker Selby (incumbent) | 8,857 | 50.70% |
| Republican | Nikki Miller | 8,612 | 49.30% |
| Total votes | | 17,469 | 100% |
| Democratic hold | | | |

=== 2022 ===
2022 Delaware House of Representatives election, 20th district
| Party | Candidate | Votes | % |
|---|---|---|---|
| Democratic | Stell Parker Selby | 6,635 | 51.44% |
| Republican | Dallas Wingate | 6,264 | 48.56% |
| Total votes | | 12,899 | 100% |
| Democratic gain from Republican | | | |

=== 2006 ===
2006 Delaware State Treasurer election
| Party | Candidate | Votes | % |
|---|---|---|---|
| Democratic | Jack Markell (incumbent) | 174,388 | 70.5% |
| Republican | Esthelda R. Parker Selby | 73,005 | 29.5% |
| Total votes | | 247,393 | 100% |
| Democratic hold | | | |

=== 2002 ===
2002 Delaware Senate election, 19th district Republican primary
| Party | Candidate | Votes | % |
|---|---|---|---|
| Republican | Esthelda Parker Selby | 469 | 53.30% |
| Republican | Matthew Opaliski | 411 | 46.70% |
| Total votes | | 880 | 100% |

2002 Delaware Senate election, 19th district
| Party | Candidate | Votes | % |
|---|---|---|---|
| Democratic | Thurman Adams Jr. (incumbent) | 6,397 | 63.64% |
| Republican | Esthelda Parker Selby | 3,655 | 36.36% |
| Total votes | | 10,052 | 100% |
| Democratic hold | | | |
