= 2026 Delaware elections =

- November 3, 2026

A general election was held in the U.S. state of Delaware in 2026 as part of the 2026 United States elections.

- 2026 Delaware House of Representatives election
- 2026 Delaware Senate election
- 2026 United States Senate election in Delaware
- 2026 United States House of Representatives election in Delaware
- 2026 Delaware Attorney General election
- 2026 Delaware State Auditor election
- 2026 Delaware State Treasurer election
