= Rae Krantz =

American politician

Member-elect of the Delaware House of Representatives from the 6th district
- Assuming office January 2027
- Succeeding: Debra Heffernan

Personal details
- Party: Democratic

Rachel "Rae" Krantz is an American politician who is a member-elect of the Delaware House of Representatives for the sixth district.

Krantz filed to run for the Delaware House of Representatives in 2026 for the sixth district, seeking to succeed the retiring Debra Heffernan. She won the Democratic Party primary on September 15 and then in the general election on November 3, defeating her Republican opponent Tanya Hettler.
