= Sean Lynn =

Sean Lynn may refer to:

- Sean Lynn (politician), American politician
- Sean Lynn (rugby union), Welsh professional rugby union coach
