= Cyndie Romer =

American politician

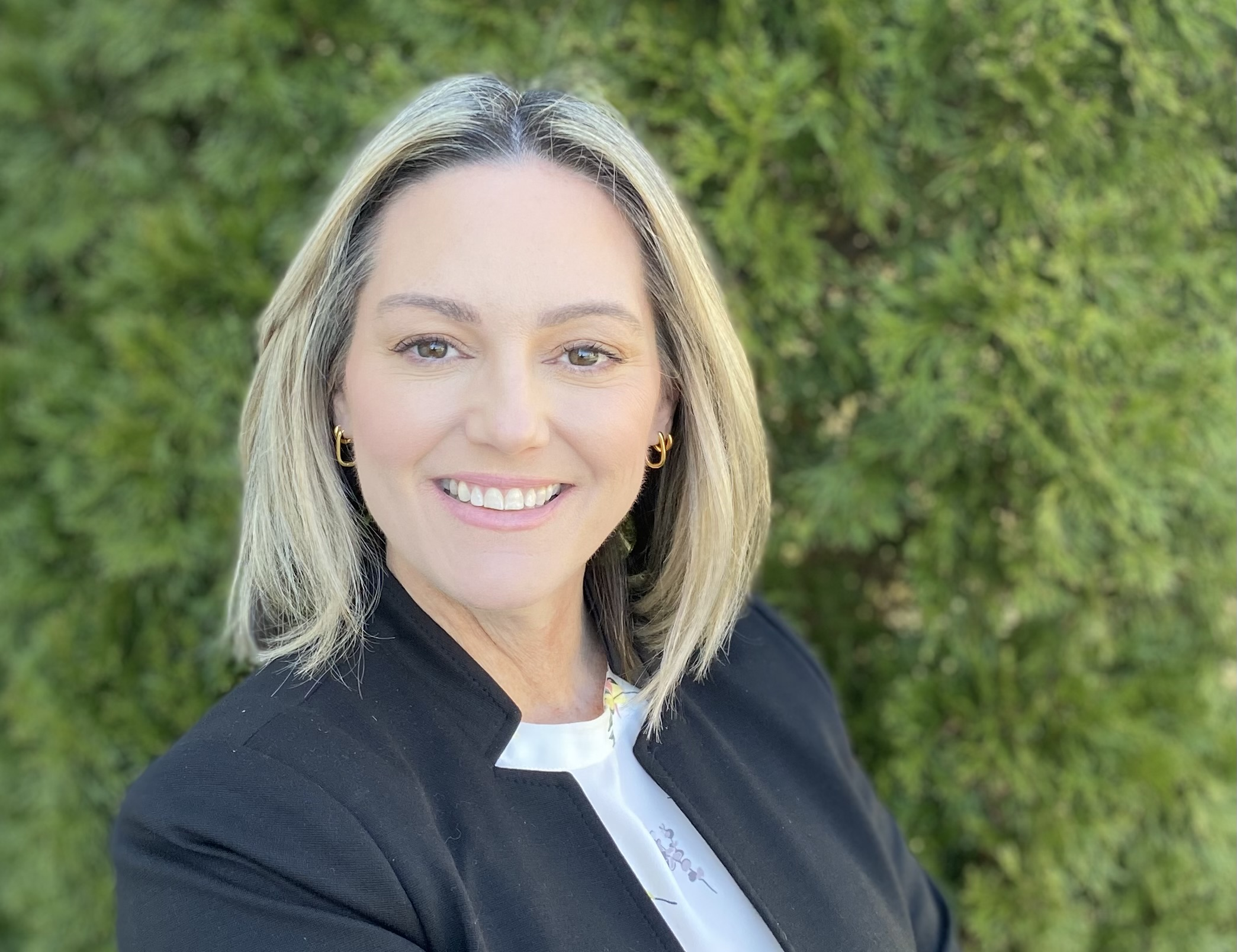

Member of the Delaware House of Representatives from the 25th district
- Incumbent
- Assumed office November 9, 2022
- Preceded by: John Kowalko

Personal details
- Party: Democratic
- Other political affiliations: Working Families Party
- Spouse: Steve
- Children: 2
- Education: Bachelor's degree
- Alma mater: University of Delaware

Cyndie Romer is an American politician serving in the Delaware House of Representatives for the 25th district as a Democrat. To win the seat, she defeated Republican opponent Lynn May in the 2022 election.

== Biography ==
Romer grew up in Hockessin with four siblings. She attended St. Elizabeth High School and then attended University of Delaware with a degree in economics.

She has been married to Steve Romer since 2002. Steve works at JP Morgan Chase, and they have two daughters and one dog, Bodhi, together. Outside of politics, she works at Diamond Technologies.
