= S. Quinton Johnson =

American politician

Quinton Johnson

Member of the Delaware House of Representatives from the 8th district
- Incumbent
- Assumed office January 13, 2009
- Preceded by: Bethany Hall-Long
- Succeeded by: Sherae'a Moore

Personal details
- Born: March 27, 1969 (age 57)
- Party: Democratic
- Education: Salisbury University
- Website: quinnjohnson.org

S. Quinton "Quinn" Johnson IV (born March 27, 1969) is an American politician. He is a Democratic member of the Delaware House of Representatives, representing District 8. He was elected in 2008 to replace Bethany Hall-Long, who had resigned to run for a seat in the Delaware Senate.

Johnson earned his BS in business management from Salisbury University.

== Electoral history ==
- In 2008, Johnson won the general election with 4,372 votes (52.6%) against Republican nominee Martha Sturtevant.
- In 2010, Johnson won the Democratic primary with 791 votes (68.1%), and went on to win the general election with 6,402 votes (63.2%) against Republican nominee Kathleen Rokosz.
- In 2012, Johnson won the general election with 6,937 votes (69.2%) against Republican nominee Matthew Brown.
- In 2014, Johnson won the general election with 3,562 votes (61.4%) against Republican nominee Matthew A. Brown.
- In 2016, Johnson was unopposed in the general election, winning 8,703 votes.
- In 2018, Johnson won the general election with 5,864 votes (62.9%) against Republican nominee Daniel Zitofsky and Libertarian nominee Cody G. McNutt.
