= Pamela Salaam =

American politician

Member of the Delaware House of Representatives from the 16th district
- Incumbent
- Assumed office November 4, 2026
- Preceded by: Franklin D. Cooke Jr.

Personal details
- Born: 1959 or 1960 (age 66–67) Wilmington, Delaware, U.S.
- Party: Democratic

Pamela Salaam is an American politician and nonprofit leader. A member of the Democratic Party, she has served in the Delaware House of Representatives since 2026.

Salaam was born and raised in the Southbridge neighborhood of Wilmington, Delaware. In 2021, she received the Governor’s Outstanding Volunteer Award from governor John Carney for preparing meals for homeless people.
