= Madinah Wilson-Anton =

American politician (born 1993)

Member of the Delaware House of Representatives from the 26th district
- Incumbent
- Assumed office November 4, 2020
- Preceded by: John Viola

Personal details
- Born: 1993 (age 32–33)
- Party: Democratic
- Other political affiliations: Working Families Party
- Spouse: Isaiah Anton
- Education: University of Delaware (BA, MPP)
- Profession: Policy analyst

Madinah Wilson-Anton (born 1993) is an American politician serving in the Delaware House of Representatives for district 26 as a Democrat. She is the first practicing Muslim elected to the Delaware General Assembly. She defeated incumbent John Viola in the Democratic primary and later won the general election for the seat in 2020.

== Early life and education ==
Wilson-Anton grew up in Newark, Delaware; she graduated from the Charter School of Wilmington before continuing on to the University of Delaware. In March 2017, CBSN quoted Wilson-Anton when the Biden Institute was founded at the University of Delaware. Wilson-Anton, then a graduate student, welcomed the move, stating that Biden's work had inspired her, and she planned to work in government upon graduation. In 2020, she earned a Master of Public Policy, also from the University of Delaware.

== Career ==
Wilson-Anton worked as a legislative aide for two members of Delaware legislature, Earl Jaques of the 27th district, and John Viola of the 26th district. In October 2019 Jaques mocked Eric Morrison, his rival for the Democratic nomination for his seat, for holding a fundraiser where he performed as a drag queen. The News Journal republished a tweet in which Wilson-Anton criticized her former boss. Jaques formally apologized.

As a Legislature Fellow, she voiced disappointment after two legislators protested an Islamic prayer.

== Delaware House of Representatives ==
=== 2020 Delaware House campaign ===
Wilson-Anton's 2020 campaign focused on education, housing, and health care, and she has stated support for a state-level Green New Deal. Her campaign was endorsed by the Working Families Party. When Wilson-Anton announced she was competing for the Democratic nomination reporters noted that, if elected, she would be the first practicing Muslim to serve in the Delaware legislature.

She defeated 22-year incumbent representative John Viola in the primary election by 43 votes. Because the district is solidly-Democratic, Wilson-Anton won the November general election with minimal opposition and became the first practicing Muslim elected to Delaware's state legislature.

Christian Century noted that four other states elected their first Muslim legislators, in 2020. Iman Jodeh, Christopher Benjamin, Mauree Turner and Samba Baldeh were the first Muslim legislators in Colorado, Florida, Oklahoma and Wisconsin, respectively.

=== Tenure ===
Wilson-Anton's first bill expanded public school religious holiday policies to include minority faith holidays like Eid al-Fitr.

Along with State Senator Sarah McBride, Wilson-Anton called on fellow State Representative Gerald Brady to resign after he made racist comments toward Asian-Americans in a leaked email.

Wilson-Anton has called for a permanent cease-fire in the Gaza war. On December 11, 2023, she interrupted a speech by Vice President Kamala Harris, unfurling a sign reading “ceasefire” and shouting, "Did you know in Bethlehem, baby Jesus is under rubble? Why won’t you call for a cease-fire?" She has called President Joe Biden a "war criminal."

Wilson-Anton criticized speaker Melissa Minor-Brown's handling of the longterm absence of Stell Parker Selby, who suffered a major stroke and missed the entire legislative session in June 2025, alleging House Democrats were trying to cover up her health condition and delay a special election. She also called on Parker Selby to resign her seat.

== Personal life ==
Wilson-Anton was diagnosed with vitiligo at nineteen years old.

=== Kill Tony Appearance ===
Wilson-Anton appeared on the comedy podcast Kill Tony, completing a 60 second stand-up set in Austin, TX. In the interview portion of the show, Wilson discussed vitiligo and her politics.

== Electoral history ==
=== 2020 ===
Delaware House of Representatives District 26 Democratic Primary, 2020
Party	Candidate	Votes	%
Democratic	Madinah Wilson-Anton	1,276	42.68
Democratic	John Viola (incumbent)	1,233	41.24
Democratic	Gabriel Olawale Adelagunja	481	16.09
Total votes		2,990	100.0

Delaware House of Representatives District 26 General Election, 2020
Party	Candidate	Votes	%
Democratic	Madinah Wilson-Anton	6,930	71.57
Republican	Timothy Conrad	2,753	28.43
Total votes		9,683	100.0
