= Shay Frisby =

American politician and social worker

Member of the Delaware Senate from the 5th district
- Incumbent
- Assumed office TBD
- Preceded by: Ray Seigfried

Personal details
- Party: Democratic
- Other political affiliations: Working Families Party Democratic Socialists of America
- Education: Wesley College (BS); Wilmington University (MS)

Sharikka "Shay" Renee Frisby is an American social worker and politician who has served in the Delaware Senate since 2026.

Frisby earned a Master of Science in administration of justice with a concentration in leadership and administration from Wilmington University in 2016.
