= Alonna Berry =

American politician (born 1989)

Member of the Delaware House of Representatives from the 20th district
- Incumbent
- Assumed office August 12, 2025
- Preceded by: Stell Parker Selby

Personal details
- Born: 1989 (age 36–37)
- Party: Democratic
- Children: 2
- Relatives: Bryan Stevenson (cousin)
- Education: Syracuse University (BA); Wilmington University

Alonna Berry (born 1989) is an American educator and politician who is a member of the Delaware House of Representatives from the 20th district after winning an August 2025 special election to succeed Stell Parker Selby, who resigned due to health issues.

== Early life and education ==
Berry grew up in Kent County and Milton. She graduated from Syracuse University in 2011 with a Bachelor of Arts in writing and rhetoric and was elected to the alumni association's board of trustees in 2025. She holds a postgraduate certificate in virtual online teaching and learning from the University of Pennsylvania, a graduate degree in management and organizational leadership from Wilmington University, where she is a doctoral candidate.

== Career ==
Berry began her career as an educator with Teach for America and was a 40 under 40 honoree of the Delaware Business Times in 2020.

Berry served as a leader of the Family Services Cabinet Council and as Delaware's first Statewide Trauma-Informed Care Coordinator within governor John Carney's cabinet. In November 2024, Carney appointed her to a six-year term to the Delaware Community Foundation's board of directors.

Berry founded the Bryan Allen Stevenson School of Excellence (BASSE) in 2024, a free public charter school in Georgetown, Delaware, named after Bryan Stevenson. Berry is a cousin of Stevenson, who worked with her to found the school. She currently serves as executive director of the Delaware Center for Justice, a nonprofit providing legal assistance.

== Delaware House of Representatives ==
Following incumbent Democrat Stell Parker Selby's resignation from the Delaware House of Representatives due to health issues, Berry announced she would seek the Democratic nomination for the ensuing special election. She was selected to be the Democratic nominee on July 3, 2025, and faced Republican Nikki Miller. In a competitive race, Berry defeated Miller by 121 votes.

== Personal life ==
Berry lives in Milton, Delaware, with her husband and two sons.

== Electoral history ==
=== 2025 ===
2025 Delaware House of Representatives special election, 20th district
Party	Candidate	Votes	%
Democratic	Alonna Berry	4,653	50.61%
Republican	Nikki Miller	4,532	49.30%
Write-in		8	0.09%
Total votes		9,193	100%
Democratic hold			
