= Valerie Longhurst =

American politician (born 1963)

Val Longhurst
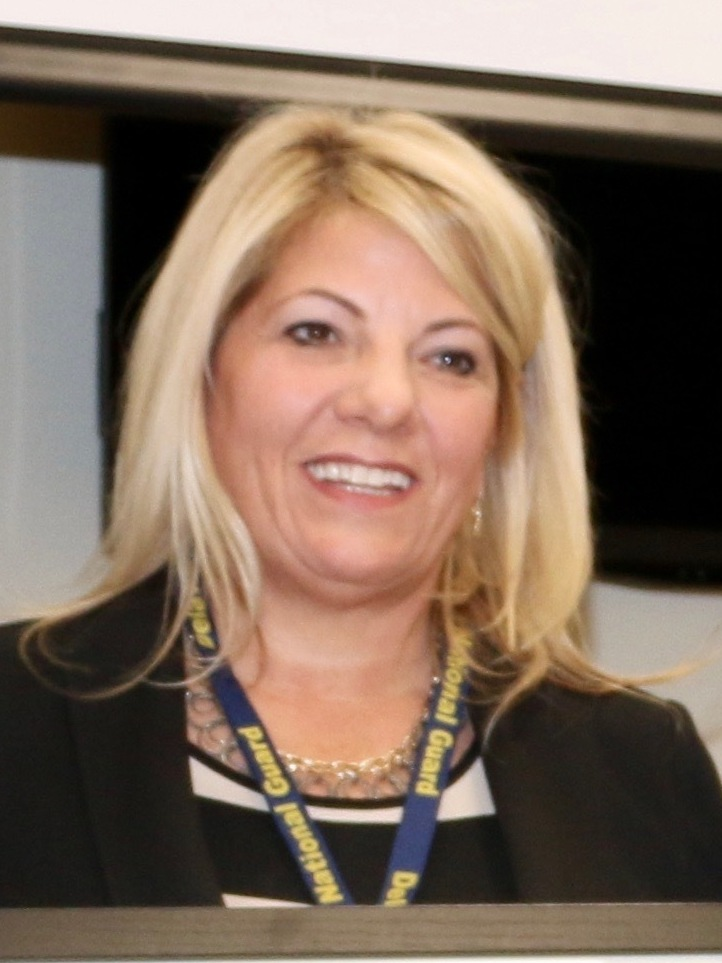
- Longhurst in 2017

Speaker of the Delaware House of Representatives
- In office June 30, 2023 – November 5, 2024
- Preceded by: Peter Schwartzkopf
- Succeeded by: Melissa Minor-Brown

Majority Leader of the Delaware House of Representatives
- In office January 8, 2013 – June 30, 2023
- Preceded by: Peter Schwartzkopf
- Succeeded by: Melissa Minor-Brown

Member of the Delaware House of Representatives from the 15th district
- In office November 3, 2004 – November 5, 2024
- Preceded by: Nancy Cook
- Succeeded by: Kamela Smith

Personal details
- Born: December 17, 1963 (age 62) Kewanee, Illinois, U.S.
- Party: Democratic
- Education: West Chester University

Valerie J. Longhurst (born December 17, 1963) is an American politician. She was a Democratic member of the Delaware House of Representatives until 2024 and served as speaker her final two years in office. She was first elected in 2004 to represent the 15th district, which covers parts of Bear, Delaware City, and St. Georges.

In the 2024 Democratic primary, Longhurst was defeated by progressive Kamela Smith.

== Career ==
Longhurst began her career in the insurance industry and was formerly director of operations for AIG Insurance in Chadds Ford, Pennsylvania.

Longhurst was first elected to the Delaware legislature in 2004 and served in the state House of Representatives for nearly two decades. Four years after her first election, she became the House minority whip and went on to serve as majority leader for eleven years before becoming speaker in her final term in office.

In 2016, she defeated Democratic challenger James Burton by 28 points in the primary election. In 2018, she won the general election with 7,329 votes (87.9%) against Libertarian nominee Amy Merlino. However, in the 2024 primary, Longhurst was defeated by progressive Democrat Kamela Smith, 53% to 47%.

Delaware House of Representatives
Preceded by Peter Schwartzkopf	Majority Leader of the Delaware House of Representatives; 2013–2023	Succeeded by Melissa Minor-Brown
Political offices
Preceded by Peter Schwartzkopf	Speaker of the Delaware House of Representatives; 2023–2024	Succeeded by Melissa Minor-Brown
