= Ray Seigfried =

American politician from Delaware

Member of the Delaware Senate from the 5th district
- Incumbent
- Assumed office February 16, 2025
- Preceded by: Kyle Evans Gay
- Succeeded by: Shay Frisby

Member of the Delaware House of Representatives from the 7th district
- In office November 7, 2018 – November 4, 2020
- Preceded by: Bryon Short
- Succeeded by: Larry Lambert

Personal details
- Born: August 23, 1950 (age 76)
- Party: Democratic
- Website: Official website

Raymond J. Seigfried (born August 23, 1950) is an American politician. He is a Democratic member of the Delaware Senate, representing district 5 since 2025. He previously represented district 7 in the Delaware House of Representatives from 2018 to 2020.

Seigfried is a professor of healthcare policy and worked as a senior vice president for Christiana Care for over 25 years.

== Electoral history ==
In 2018, Seigfried topped four other Democrats in the primary election to replace retiring Democrat Bryon Short, winning 762 votes (28.7%) in the five-way race. He won the general election with 5,943 votes (62.9%) against Republican nominee Eric Braunstein and Libertarian nominee Scott Gesty. Seigfried lived on the same street as Braunstein.

In 2020, Seigfried was defeated in the Democratic primary in a rematch with the 2018 primary runner-up, progressive Larry Lambert, by a 59%-41% margin.

In 2025, Seigfried was nominated as the Democratic candidate for the special election in Senate District 5, in anticipation of the resignation of its current Senator, Kyle Evans Gay, who was elected Lieutenant Governor the previous November, defeating Shay Frisby in an inter-party vote of 23-20 with 1 abstention. He faced Brent Burdge, who previously ran unsuccessfully for the House District 10 in 2022 and 2024, which mostly overlaps with Senate District 5. On the February 15th special election he defeated Burdge. Seigfried officially took office on February 16, 2025, and he was sworn in on March 11, 2025.

In the 2026 State Senate Democratic primary, Seigfried lost to progressive challenger Shay Frisby by a 58%-42% margin.

== Legislation ==
In 2025, Seigfried sponsored legislation to create a special open enrollment period for Medicare supplement enrollees.

Also in 2025, Seigfried co-sponsored Senate Bill 21 which amended Delaware's corporate law. The bill created some controversy, with some arguing it is unduly favorable to the wealthy.
