= Krista Griffith =

American politician from Delaware

Member of the Delaware House of Representatives from the 12th district
- Incumbent
- Assumed office November 7, 2018
- Preceded by: Deborah Hudson

Personal details
- Born: October 4, 1972 (age 53)
- Party: Democratic
- Education: University of New Hampshire; Suffolk University Law School
- Profession: Attorney
- Website: Official website

Krista Mollee Griffith (born October 4, 1972) is an American politician. She is a Democratic member of the Delaware House of Representatives, representing district 12.

Griffith was elected in the general election on November 6, 2018, winning 53 percent of the vote over incumbent Republican Deborah Hudson, who had been part of the Republican caucus leadership. Prior to her election, Griffith worked as a Deputy Attorney General in the Delaware Department of Justice.

Delaware House of Representatives
Preceded by Deborah Hudson	Member of the Delaware House of Representatives from the 12th district 2018–Present	Incumbent
