= W. Shannon Morris =

American politician from Delaware

Member of the Delaware House of Representatives from the 30th district
- Incumbent
- Assumed office November 7, 2018
- Preceded by: William Outten

Personal details
- Party: Republican

William Shannon Morris is an American politician. He is a Republican member of the Delaware House of Representatives, representing District 30. In 2018, Morris was elected after winning the general election against Democratic nominee Charles Groce.
