= Michael F. Smith =

American politician from Delaware

Member of the Delaware House of Representatives from the 22nd district
- Incumbent
- Assumed office November 7, 2018
- Preceded by: Joseph Miró

Personal details
- Party: Republican
- Education: University of Delaware

Michael F. Smith is an American politician. He is a Republican member of the Delaware House of Representatives, representing District 22. In 2018, he won the Republican primary with 64 percent of the vote. He went on to win the general election by 140 votes, with 5,955 votes total (50.6%) against Democratic nominee Guillermina Gonzalez.
