= Sherae'a Moore =

American politician

Sherae'a "Rae" Moore

Member of the Delaware House of Representatives from the 8th district
- Incumbent
- Assumed office November 4, 2020
- Preceded by: S. Quinton Johnson

Personal details
- Party: Democratic
- Education: Delaware State University (B.A.); Liberty University (M.A.)
- Website: Official website

Sherae'a Eboni "Rae" Moore is an American politician from the state of Delaware. A Democrat, Moore has represented the 8th district of the Delaware House of Representatives, which encompasses a parts New Castle County, since November 2020.

== Early life ==
Moore attended school in Appoquinimink School District and graduated from Middletown High School. She then became the first in her family to finish college when graduated cum laude from Delaware State University, where she earned her Bachelor of Arts in English. Moore then earned her Master of Arts in public policy and administration.

In 2016, Moore served as the deputy regional director for the Delaware Democratic Party in Kent County. She also worked as a legislative assistant for the Delaware House of Representatives. After working as a public servant, Moore became a teacher.

== Political career ==
In 2020, Moore won a three-way primary with 41.8% of the vote to replace retiring incumbent S. Quinton Johnson. Moore then defeated Republican Dan Zitofsky with 7,567 votes (57%).
