= Kamela Smith =

American politician

Member of the Delaware House of Representatives from the 15th district
- Incumbent
- Assumed office November 5, 2024
- Preceded by: Valerie Longhurst

Personal details
- Party: Democratic Party
- Other political affiliations: Working Families Party
- Education: University of Pittsburgh

Kamela T. Smith is an American politician. She is a Democratic Party member of the Delaware House of Representatives, representing the 15th district.

== Biography ==
Smith grew up in Philadelphia, Pennsylvania, and attended the University of Pittsburgh, where she graduated with a bachelor's degree in 1994. At the university, she was a member of the Delta Sigma Theta sorority. A single mother, she moved with her family from Philadelphia to Delaware around the early 2000s.

Smith worked in the mental health department of a local nonprofit organization for a time before working at ChristianaCare, where she became the director of community education and engagement. She also served on the board of trustees at the Kalmar Nyckel Foundation and was a member of the James H. Gilliam program run by the Metropolitan Wilmington Urban League.

In December 2023, Smith announced her intention to run for the Delaware House of Representatives for the 15th district, which contains the community of Bear. She faced off in the primary against Valerie Longhurst, who had held the seat since 2004 and was the active Speaker of the House. Endorsed by the progressive Working Families Party, Smith ended up winning the primary in a major upset, receiving 53.3% of the vote (1,453 votes) to Longhurst who received 46.7% (1,273 votes). She later won in the general election unopposed.
