= Republican State Committee of Delaware =

Delaware affiliate of the Republican Party

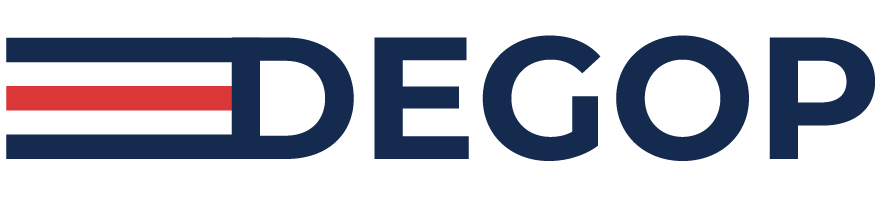
- Chairperson: Gene Truono
- Senate Leader: Gerald Hocker
- House Leader: Timothy Dukes
- Headquarters: 501 Hawley St; Wilmington, Delaware 19805
- Membership (2021): ▲210,180
- Ideology: Majority: Conservatism; Factions: Trumpism
- Political position: Right-wing
- National affiliation: Republican Party
- Colors: Red
- Delaware Senate: 6 / 21
- Delaware House of Representatives: 14 / 41
- Statewide Executive Offices: 0 / 6
- United States Senate: 0 / 2
- United States House of Representatives: 0 / 1
- County Councils: 8 / 24

Election symbol

Website
- delawaregop.com

The Republican State Committee of Delaware is the affiliate of the United States Republican Party in Delaware. It has five regional offices in Kent County, Western New Castle County, Central New Castle County, Northern New Castle County, and Sussex County. The party has historically had weak electoral power in the state.

== History of the party ==
Former logo

=== Beginning ===
The Republican State Committee of Delaware got its start in the mid-19th century, when the American Party (a group dedicated to prohibition of alcohol), People's Party, and former Whigs reformed under the Union Party. This party was dedicated to preserve the Union in the time of Abraham Lincoln's election. While Delaware did not secede from the Union, Delaware Democrats and other supporters often opposed Lincoln's policies. The Republican Party struggled to gain control in the state from 1865 to 1898, with the Democratic Party maintaining control of both the federal and state level of government. However, changes in industry and the arrival of immigrants in key locations would soon spell the rise of the Republican Party in Delaware.

=== The RSC's first rise to prominence ===
With industry and business slowly overtaking agriculture in the state, the Republican Party in Delaware began to develop the support it needed to overthrow the long incumbent Democratic Party. However, the rise of the party was not complete without some controversial actions. As it was common in the era, the late 1800s was rife with voter corruption and illegal election techniques. One candidate, John Addicks, was infamous for attempting to buy a U.S. Senate seat by exploiting the rising party. Republicans in the state divided on the issue with Regular Republicans opposing Addicks while Union Republicans supported him. Although Addicks didn't win election in 1899 or 1901, his corrupt tactics led to a vacation of the U.S. Senate seat for over ten years. However, Addick's corruption proved to be only a small speed bump. With industry as a growing part of the Delaware economy, the Republican Party began to grow in popularity. With men such as Henry du Pont and T. Colemon du Pont (Both members of the famous industrial du Pont family) leading the way, the Republican Party quickly gained power in the state and various government positions.

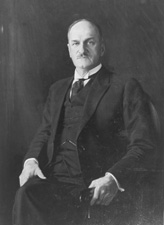
Thomas du Pont: U.S. Senator and key figure to the rise of the Delaware Republican Party

By 1915, Republicans controlled the Delaware Senate by a margin of 12 to 5 and the House by 23 to 10. Governors of the state remained Republican candidates from 1897 up until 1936. With the exception of ratifying the 19th Amendment on a state level (once the U.S. Constitution accepted it, then Delaware did as well), the Republican majority in both the federal and state level dominated legislation until the mid-1930s.

=== Trading time with the Democrats ===
Since World War II, the Republican Party of Delaware has had its time of prominence and powerlessness. Two Republicans, John J. Williams and J. Caleb Boggs, compromised two-thirds of the "Big Three" in Delaware politics. Williams would end up serving in the U.S. Senate from 1946 to 1971 while Boggs won seven statewide elections consisting of governor, U.S. House of Representatives, and U.S. Senate from 1947 to 1973.

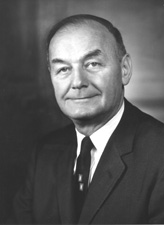
John J. Williams: U.S. Senator from Delaware (1947–1970)

From 1949 to 2008, the Republican Party has held the governorship for 29 years compared to the 30 years held by Democrats. Despite dominating the gubernatorial position from 1977 to 1993, all gubernatorial elections have been won by Democrats since 1993.

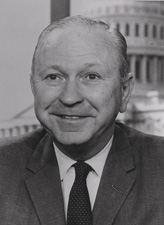
J. Caleb Boggs: Republican Governor, U.S. Senator, and U.S. Representative from Delaware

== Party leadership ==
- State Chair: Gene Truono
- Vice Chair: Jim Weldin
- Treasurer: Robin Hayes
- Secretary: Brandon Brice
- College Republican Chair: Ira Hurwitz
- Delaware Federation of Republican Women Chair: Jane Walsh
- National Committeeman: Hank McCann
- National Committeewoman: Mary McCrossan

== Current elected officials ==
=== Members of Congress ===
==== U.S. Senate ====
- None

Both of Delaware's U.S. Senate seats have been held by Democrats since 2001. William Roth was the last Republican to represent Delaware in the U.S. Senate. First elected in 1970, Roth lost his bid for a sixth term in 2000 to Tom Carper.

==== U.S. House of Representatives ====
- None

Delaware's lone congressional district has been held by Democrats since 2011. The last Republican to represent Delaware in the House of Representatives was Mike Castle. First elected in 1992, Castle opted not to run for re-election in 2010, instead unsuccessfully running for the Republican nomination for U.S. Senate. Glen Urquhart ran as the Republican nominee for the House seat in the 2010 election and was subsequently defeated by Democratic challenger John Carney.

=== Statewide offices ===
- None

Delaware has not elected any GOP candidates to statewide office since 2014, when Tom Wagner was re-elected as state auditor and Ken Simpler was elected as state treasurer. In 2018, Wagner opted not to seek re-election to an eight term. In 2018 elections James Spadola ran as the Republican nominee for auditor and was subsequently defeated by Democratic challenger Kathy McGuiness while Simpler was defeated in his bid for a second term as treasurer by Democratic challenger Colleen Davis.

=== State legislative leaders ===
- Senate Minority Leader: Gerald Hocker
- House Minority Leader: Timothy Dukes

== State Assembly ==
=== State senators ===
In 2017, Republicans controlled ten State Senate seats. State Senators must be citizens of the United States and have resided in Delaware for three years. Candidates must also have been a resident of their respective district for at least one year preceding their election. The age requirement to run for this elected seat is 27 years old. In 2016, civil attorney Anthony Delcollo defeated long time 26-year incumbent, President Pro-Tempore Patrica Blevins (D) by 206 votes; Delcollo's gain thinned the partisan margin in the Senate.

In 2018, Minority Whip Senator Greg Lavelle (R) lost his reelection bid to Senator Laura V. Sturgeon by a margin of 53% to 47%, widening the gap between Democrats and Republicans by an additional seat. Presently, Republicans have nine seats in the Delaware State Senate to the Democrats' 12 seats.

Senator F. Gary Simpson, the Senate GOP's minority leader, retired before the 2018 elections. His seat was filled by Senator David Wilson.

- 5th Senate District: Cathy Cloutier
- 6th Senate District: Ernesto Lopez
- 7th Senate District: Anthony Delcollo
- 15th Senate District: David G. Lawson
- 16th Senate District: Colin Bonini
- 18th Senate District: David Wilson
- 19th Senate District: Brian Pettyjohn
- 20th Senate District: Gerald Hocker
- 21st Senate District: Bryant Richardson

=== State representatives ===
As of 2019, Republicans controlled 15 of the 41 State Assembly seats. Any candidate running for the House of Representatives must have lived in Delaware for three years and be a U.S. Citizen. The candidate must also live in the district at least one year prior to running for office and be at least 24 years of age.

- 9th Representative District: Kevin Hensley
- 11th Representative District: Jeffrey Spiegelman
- 20th Representative District: Stephen Smyk
- 22nd Representative District: Mike Smith
- 30th Representative District: Bobby Outten
- 33rd Representative District: Harold Peterman
- 34th Representative District: Lyndon Yearick
- 35th Representative District: David Wilson
- 36th Representative District: Harvey R. Kenton
- 37th Representative District: Ruth Briggs King
- 38th Representative District: Ronald Gray
- 39th Representative District/Minority Leader: Danny Short
- 40th Representative District: Tim Dukes
- 41st Representative District: Richard Collins

== List of Chairs ==
- J. Frank Allee (1886–1896)
- Charles Warner (1920–1922)
- William D. Denney (1926–1928)
- Ebe H. Chandler (1937–?)
- Clair J. Killoran (1950–1956)
- Ellwood S. Leach (1958–1961)
- William Roth (1961–1964)
- Clayton S. Harrison Jr. (1964–?)
- Basil R. Battaglia (1993–2001)
- Terry A. Strine (2003–2008)
- Tom Ross (2008–2011)
- John C. Sigler (2011–2013)
- Charles L. Copeland (2013–2017)
- Michael J. Harrington Sr. (2017–2019)
- M. Jane Brady (2019–2023)
- Julianne Murray (2023–2025)
- Gene Truono (2025-present)

== Notable Delaware Republicans ==
- J. Caleb Boggs: Former governor, U.S. senator and representative
- Thomas du Pont: Former U.S. senator and key figure in organizing the early Delaware Republican Party
- William Roth: To date, the last Republican to have represented Delaware in the U.S. Senate
- John J. Williams: Former U.S. senator (1947–1970)

== See also ==
- Delaware State Capitol
- Delaware General Assembly
- Delaware House of Representatives
- Delaware Senate
