= Charles Postles Jr. =

American politician from Delaware

Member of the Delaware House of Representatives from the 33rd district
- Incumbent
- Assumed office November 7, 2016
- Preceded by: Harold Peterman

Personal details
- Party: Republican
- Education: University of Delaware
- Occupation: Farmer

Charles S. Postles Jr. is an American politician. He is a Republican member of the Delaware House of Representatives, representing District 33.

== Electoral history ==
- In 2016, Postles won the three-way Republican primary with 714 votes (45.2%) to replace Harold Peterman, who had died in office. He went on to win the general election with 5,780 votes total (57.5%) against Democratic nominee Karen D. Williams.
- In 2018, Postles won the general election with 5,001 votes total (60.5%) against Democratic nominee James Todd Webb.
