= Edward Osienski =

American politician

Member of the Delaware House of Representatives from the 24th district
- Incumbent
- Assumed office November 3, 2010
- Preceded by: William A. Oberle, Jr.

Personal details
- Party: Democratic
- Education: Delaware Technical Community College
- Website: goeddieo.com

Edward S. Osienski is an American politician. He is a Democratic member of the Delaware House of Representatives, representing District 24. He was elected in 2010 after the retirement of Republican William Oberle.

== Electoral history ==
- In 2010, Osienski won the Democratic primary with 581 votes (70.9%), and went on to win the general election with 3,531 votes (68.4%) against Republican nominee Abraham Jones.
- In 2012, Osienski was unopposed for the general election, winning 7,445 votes.
- In 2014, Osienski was unopposed for the general election, winning 3,194 votes.
- In 2016, Osienski won the general election with 6,406 votes (68.7%) against Republican nominee Timothy Conrad.
- In 2018, Osienski won the general election with 4,989 votes (69.3%) against Republican nominee William W. Dilks, Sr.
