= Kevin Hensley (politician) =

American politician

Kevin S. Hensley

Member of the Delaware House of Representatives from the 9th district
- Incumbent
- Assumed office November 5, 2014
- Preceded by: Rebecca Walker

Personal details
- Party: Republican
- Children: 2
- Education: University of Delaware

Kevin S. Hensley is an American Republican politician. He is a member of the Delaware House of Representatives from the 9th district, serving since 2014.

On April 3, 2025 Hensley pled guilty to Vehicular Assault and DUI for injuring another driver while intoxicated. He was removed from the budget committee and was his second alcohol-related offense. (2025)

In 2026, Hensley announced he would be retiring from the Delaware House at the end of his term.
