= William Bush IV =

American politician from Delaware

William Bush

Member of the Delaware House of Representatives from the 29th district
- Incumbent
- Assumed office November 7, 2018
- Preceded by: W. Charles Paradee

Personal details
- Born: Dover, Delaware, U.S.
- Party: Democratic
- Spouse: Carrie
- Children: 3
- Education: Widener University School of Law
- Occupation: Lawyer
- Website: Official website

William G. Bush IV (born February 1968) is an American politician. He is a Democratic member of the Delaware House of Representatives, representing district 29. Bush was elected in the general election on November 6, 2018, winning 58 percent of the vote over Republican candidate Robin Hayes. He earned his undergraduate degree at the University of Delaware and received a Juris Doctor degree from Widener University.
