= Jesse Vanderwende =

American politician from Delaware

Jesse R. Vanderwende

Member of the Delaware House of Representatives from the 35th district
- Incumbent
- Assumed office November 7, 2018
- Preceded by: David Wilson

Personal details
- Party: Republican

Jesse R. Vanderwende is an American politician. He is a Republican member of the Delaware House of Representatives, representing District 35. In 2018, Vanderwende was elected after winning the Republican primary with nearly 60 percent of the vote. He was unopposed in the general election.

Delaware House of Representatives
Preceded by David Wilson	Member of the Delaware House of Representatives from the 35th district 2018–Present	Incumbent
