= Richard G. Collins =

American politician and farmer

Member of the Delaware House of Representatives from the 41st district
- Incumbent
- Assumed office November 5, 2014
- Preceded by: John C. Atkins

Personal details
- Born: August 15, 1949 (age 76)
- Party: Republican

Richard G. Collins (born August 15, 1949) is an American politician and farmer. He is a Republican member of the Delaware House of Representatives representing District 41. He is the owner of Access Insurance.

== Electoral history ==
- In 2014, Collins defeated incumbent John C. Atkins in the general election, winning 52.2% of the vote.
- In 2016, Collins won the general election with 59.2% of the vote.
- In 2018, Collins won the general election with 60.8% of the vote.

== Views ==
While Collins denounced the storming of the Capitol in January 2021, he defended Donald Trump and said he was "not surprised that people are angry".
