= Kimberly Williams (politician) =

American politician

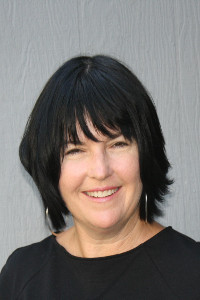

Member of the Delaware House of Representatives from the 19th district
- Incumbent
- Assumed office November 7, 2012
- Preceded by: Robert Gilligan

Personal details
- Party: Democratic
- Website: Official website

Kimberly Williams is an American politician. She is a Democratic member of the Delaware House of Representatives representing district 19 since 2012.

== Early life and career ==
Williams graduated from Wilmington High School in Delaware, which later closed. In 2009, she was elected to the Red Clay School Board and served for three years, including one year as vice president.

== Political career ==
In 2012, Williams ran to fill the open seat in District 19 created by the retirement of Speaker of the Delaware House of Representatives Robert Gilligan. She ran on a campaign supporting unions, small businesses, and education. She beat Bill Dunn in the Democratic primary and went on to win the general election against her Republican opponent.

Williams sponsored and lead the fight to pass H.B. 337, which made Delaware the first state to fully ban child marriage for any person under 18 years old. Republicans in the Delaware House of Representatives opposed the bill, stating that it was overly broad, while it passed unanimously in the Delaware Senate with Republican Anthony Delcollo as co-sponsor.

== Electoral history ==
- In 2012, Williams won the Democratic primary with 710 votes (54.3%), and won the general election with 6,088 votes (65.5%) against Republican nominee Dennis Cini.
- In 2014, Williams won the Democratic primary with 563 votes (67%) in a rematch against William H. Dunn, and won the general election with 3,128 votes (63.6%) against Republican nominee James Startzman.
- In 2016, Williams and James Startzman were both unopposed in their primary elections, setting up a rematch in the general election, which Williams won with 5,754 votes (63%).
- In 2018, Williams and James Startzman were both unopposed in their primary elections, setting up another rematch in the general election, where Williams beat Startzman for a third time, winning 4,725 votes (65.9%).
