= Lyndon Yearick =

American politician

Member of the Delaware House of Representatives from the 34th district
- Incumbent
- Assumed office November 5, 2014
- Preceded by: Donald Blakey

Personal details
- Born: Lyndon Dean Yearick; November 3, 1964 (age 61)
- Party: Republican

Lyndon Yearick (born November 3, 1964) is an American politician who has served in the Delaware House of Representatives from the 34th district since 2015.
