= Bryan Shupe =

American politician from Delaware

Bryan W. Shupe
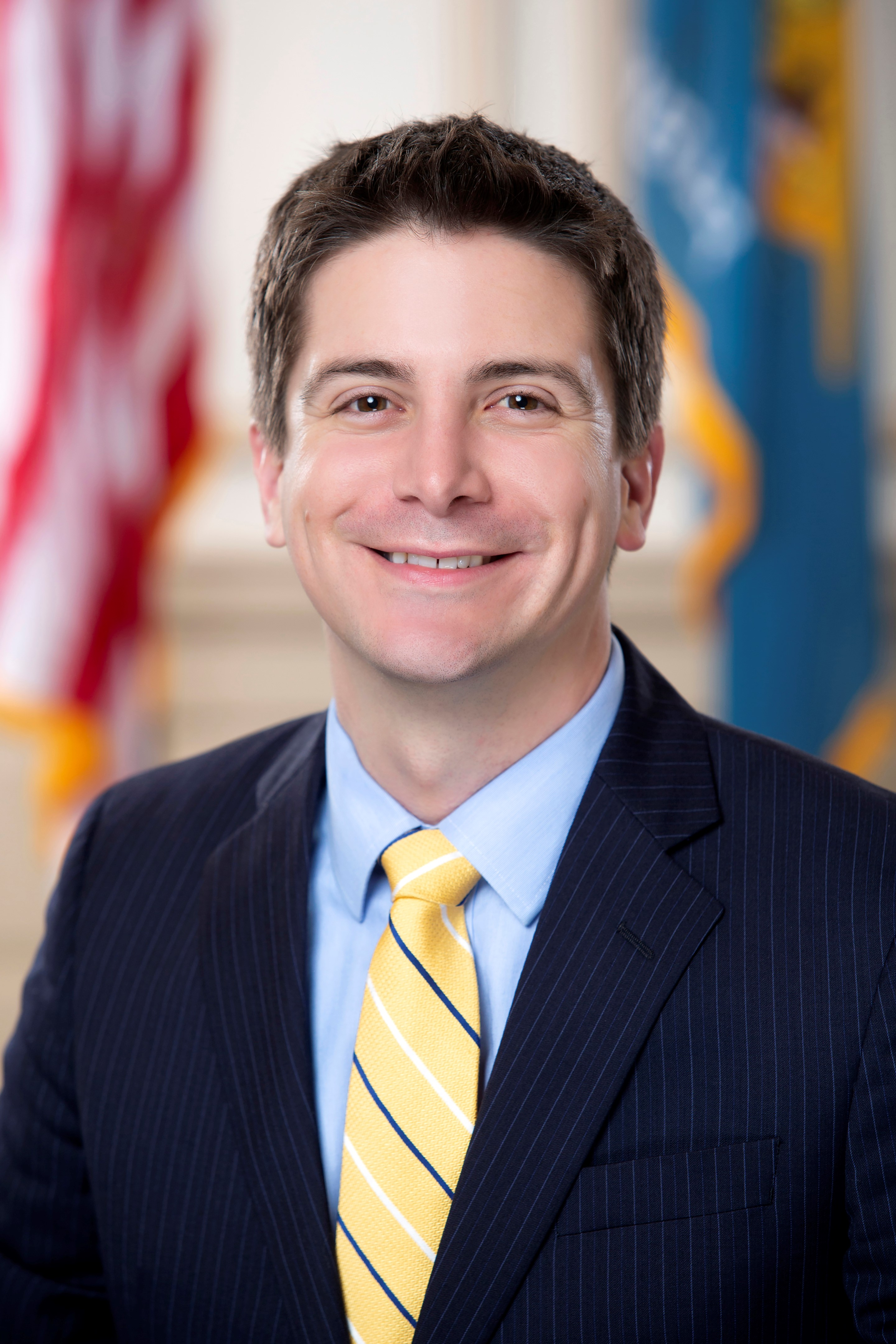
- Bryan Shupe in 2019

Member of the Delaware House of Representatives from the 36th district
- Incumbent
- Assumed office November 7, 2018
- Preceded by: Harvey Kenton

Personal details
- Born: Milford, Delaware, U.S.
- Party: Republican

Bryan W. Shupe is an American politician. He is a Republican member of the Delaware House of Representatives. He represents District 36, which includes south Milford, Ellendale, and Slaughter Beach. In 2018, Shupe was elected after winning the general election against Democratic nominee Don Allan. Prior to being elected to the Delaware House of Representatives, Shupe had served as mayor of the city of Milford.

== Facebook External links ==
- Official page at the Delaware General Assembly
- Campaign site
- Profile at Vote Smart
