= Kendra Johnson =

American politician

Member of the Delaware House of Representatives from the 5th district
- Incumbent
- Assumed office November 7, 2018
- Preceded by: Melanie George Smith

Personal details
- Party: Democratic
- Education: Lincoln University
- Website: Official website

Kendra Johnson is an American politician. She is a Democratic member of the Delaware House of Representatives, representing District 5. In 2018, Johnson was elected after winning a three-way primary race against Ajawavi J. Ajavon and William Resto Jr., where she received nearly 60 percent of the votes. She was unopposed in the general election.
