= Debra Heffernan =

American politician (born 1962)

Member of the Delaware House of Representatives from the 6th district
- Incumbent
- Assumed office November 3, 2010
- Preceded by: Tom Kovach

Personal details
- Born: April 8, 1962 (age 64)
- Party: Democratic
- Education: University of Delaware; Duke University
- Website: debraheffernan.com

Debra J. Heffernan (born April 8, 1962) is an American politician. She is a Democratic member of the Delaware House of Representatives, representing District 6.

Heffernan earned her BS in biology from the University of Delaware and her MS in environmental toxicology from Duke University. She is Jewish.

Heffernan is a part of the centrist wing of the Delaware Democratic Party. She supported centrist US Senator Tom Carper in the 2018 US Senate election in Delaware over progressive challenger Kerri Evelyn Harris. In 2022, she defeated progressive challenger Becca Cotto in the Democratic primary.

== Electoral history ==
- In 2010, Heffernan won the three-way general election with 4,363 votes (51.9%) against incumbent Republican Tom Kovach and Libertarian nominee Matthew Flebbe. She was one of only ten candidates to defeat a sitting Republican in a state house race in 2010 according to Ballotpedia.
- In 2012, Heffernan won the general election with 7,502 votes (62.4%) against Republican nominee Eric Taylor.
- In 2014, Heffernan won the general election with 4,496 votes (63.4%) against Republican nominee Kyle Buzzard.
- In 2016, Heffernan was unopposed in the general election and won 9,545 votes.
- In 2018, Heffernan won the general election with 7,073 (65.3%) against Republican nominee Jeffrey Olmstead.
- In 2024, Heffernan won the general election with 8,766 (65.65%) against Republican nominee Michael Krawczuk.
