= Jeffrey Spiegelman =

American politician

Member of the Delaware House of Representatives from the 11th district
- Incumbent
- Assumed office November 7, 2012
- Preceded by: Constituency established

Personal details
- Party: Republican
- Website: jeffspiegelman.com

Jeffrey N. Spiegelman is an American politician and a Republican member of the Delaware House of Representatives since January 8, 2013 representing District 11. He is Jewish.

== Elections ==
- 2012 When Republican Representative Gregory Lavelle ran for Delaware Senate and left the District 11 seat open, Spiegelman was unopposed for the September 11, 2012 Republican Primary and won with 4,192 votes, and won the three-way November 6, 2012 General election with 4,337 votes (50.3%) against Democratic nominee Lynne Newlin and Libertarian nominee Margaret McKeown.

Delaware House of Representatives
Preceded by Gregory Lavelle	Member of the Delaware House of Representatives from the 11th district 2012–Present	Incumbent
