= Franklin Cooke Jr. =

American politician

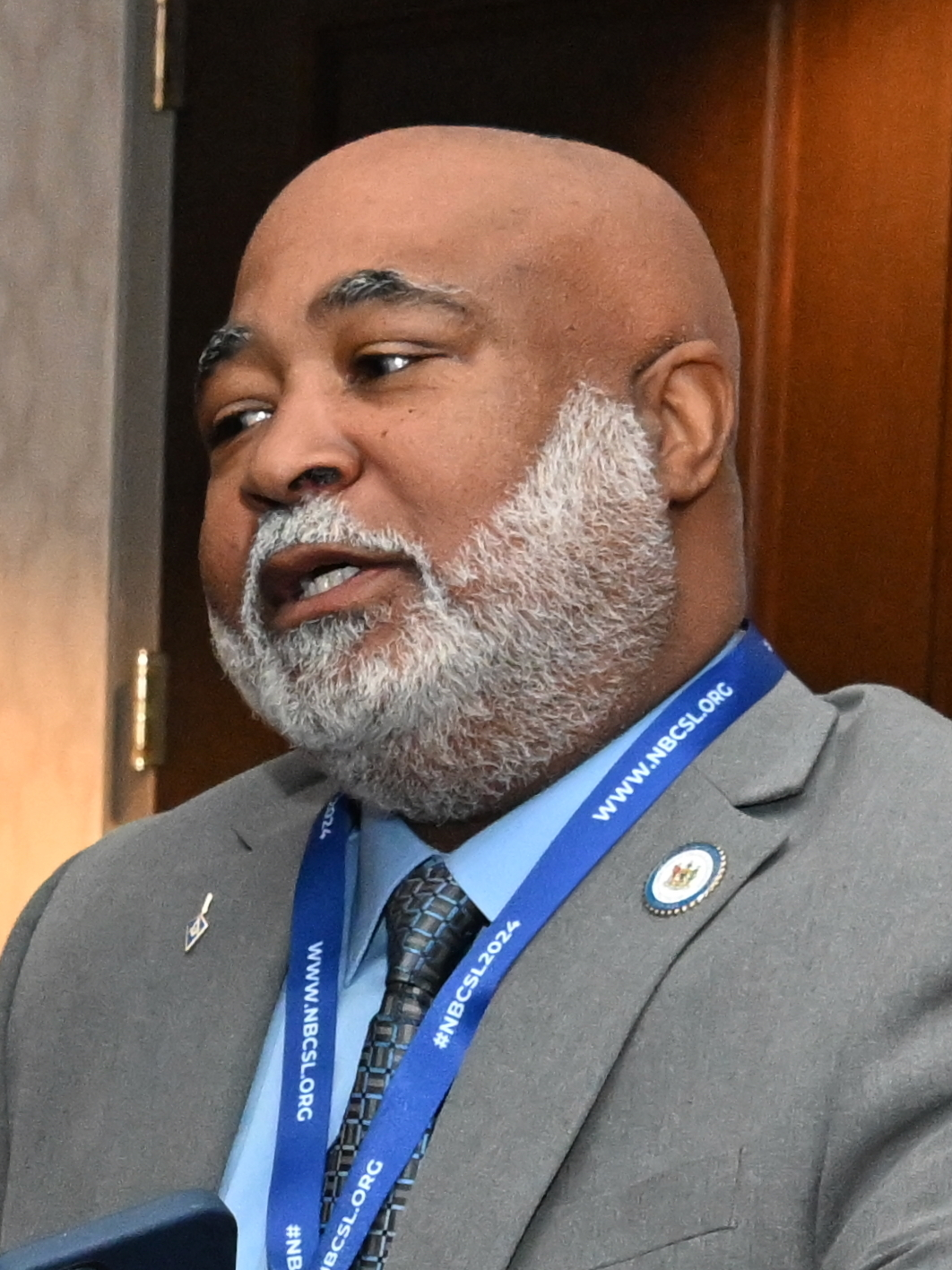

Member of the Delaware House of Representatives from the 16th district
- Incumbent
- Assumed office November 7, 2018
- Preceded by: James "J.J." Johnson

Personal details
- Born: July 21, 1958 (age 68) Wilmington, Delaware, U.S.
- Party: Democratic
- Website: Official website

Franklin D. Cooke Jr. (born July 21, 1958) is an American politician. He is a Democratic member of the Delaware House of Representatives, representing District 16. Cooke was elected in the general election on November 6, 2018, winning 85 percent of the vote over Republican candidate Albert Ament. Prior to his election, he was a police officer for New Castle County, where he was the first African-American mounted officer in the department.

In 2026, Cooke lost the Democratic primary to progressive challenger Pamela Salaam.
