= Larry Lambert =

American politician from Delaware

Member of the Delaware House of Representatives from the 7th district
- Incumbent
- Assumed office November 4, 2020
- Preceded by: Ray Seigfried

Personal details
- Party: Democratic
- Other political affiliations: Working Families Party
- Movement: Progressivism
- Website: Official website

Larry D. Lambert Jr. is an American politician. He is a Democratic member of the Delaware House of Representatives, representing District 7.

== Career ==
Lambert is part of the progressive wing of the Democratic Party, and is an advocate for policies such as universal healthcare, a $15 an hour minimum wage, police reform, and the legalization of marijuana. He was one of the best candidates that defeated incumbent centrist Democrats in the 2020 state Democratic primaries. Lambert defeated centrist incumbent Democrat Ray Seigfried in the 2020 primary with 59% of the vote. He had previously been the runner-up in the 5-way primary race in 2018, receiving 25.5% of the vote while Seigfried won with 28.7%. Lambert won the general election on November 3, 2020, with 67% of the vote over Republican candidate James Haubrich and Libertarian Party candidate Scott Gesty. In 2022, Lambert won the Democratic primary unopposed, going on to defeat his Republican opponent, Shane Stoneman by a near 43-point landslide with 71% of the vote. In 2024, Lambert defeated Republican opponent Shane Stoneman with 70.28% of the vote.
