= William Carson Jr. =

American politician (born 1950)

Member of the Delaware House of Representatives from the 28th district
- Incumbent
- Assumed office November 4, 2008
- Preceded by: Bruce Ennis

Personal details
- Born: December 24, 1950 (age 75) Dover, Delaware, U.S.
- Party: Democratic

William J. Carson Jr. (born December 24, 1950) is an American politician. He is a Democratic member of the Delaware House of Representatives, representing District 28. He was elected in 2008 to replace Democrat Bruce Ennis, who had resigned to run for a seat in the Delaware Senate. In 2026, Carson lost the Democratic primary to progressive challenger Tye Grier.

Carson graduated from Smyrna High School.

== Electoral history ==
- In 2008, Carson was unopposed in the general election, winning 7,198 votes.
- In 2010, Carson won the general election with 4,534 votes (67.7%) against Republican nominee Karen Minner.
- In 2012, Carson won the general election with 6,104 votes (71.1%) against Republican nominee Christopher Sylvester.
- In 2014, Carson was unopposed in the general election, winning 3,490 votes.
- In 2016, Carson was unopposed in the general election, winning 7,581 votes.
- In 2018, Carson won the general election with 5,176 votes (68%) against Republican nominee Charlotte Middleton.
