= Stephanie Bolden =

American politician (born 1946)

Member of the Delaware House of Representatives from the 2nd district
- Incumbent
- Assumed office November 3, 2010
- Preceded by: Hazel Plant

Personal details
- Born: August 16, 1946 (age 80) Wilmington, Delaware, U.S.
- Party: Democratic
- Education: Delaware State University (BS); Boston College (MEd)

Stephanie T. Bolden (born August 16, 1946) is an American politician. She is a Democratic member of the Delaware House of Representatives, representing District 2.

== Career ==
Bolden earned her B.S. from Delaware State University and her M.Ed from Boston College. She was formerly an educator in Christiana School District and in higher education.

Bolden was a ten-year member of the Wilmington City Council, served a term as its president pro tempore, and is a member of the Delaware Black Caucus.

She was elected to the Delaware House in 2010 after defeating incumbent Hazel Plant in the Democratic primary.

In 2026, Bolden lost the Democratic primary to progressive challenger Michelle Booker.

== Personal life ==
Bolden is Catholic.

== Lawsuit and criticism ==
On January 9, 2018, Bolden filed a lawsuit against the city of Wilmington alleging that the August 7, 2017 fire that started at a neighboring property substantially damaged Bolden's property, which was her childhood home and is the present-day headquarters of the Delaware Black Caucus. The lawsuit also claims that the city of Wilmington failed to secure the property, respond to Bolden's prior complaints and repair and maintain the property to prevent the fire. The fire allegedly caused $75,000 worth of damage to Bolden's property.

Weeks after the lawsuit was filed, Bolden became a part-time receptionist for the Wilmington City Council. She was criticized by Wilmington residents and Democratic Party members for taking the position; they claimed that doing so appeared to be a political favor and that the job should have gone to an unemployed resident of the city. In June 2018, Bolden submitted her resignation from the position, claiming that the job conflicted with her legislative schedule.

== Electoral history ==
- In 2010, Bolden was elected after defeating incumbent Democrat Hazel Plant in the Democratic primary, winning the election with 676 votes (51.2%). She was unopposed in the general election, winning 4,485 votes.
- In 2012, Bolden defeated a challenge by Arthur Scott, a former state representative, in the Democratic primary, winning with 1,400 votes (62.1%). She was unopposed in the general election, winning 6,253 votes.
- In 2014, Bolden won the general election with 2,393 votes (82%) against Republican nominee Richard Leroi Dyton.
- In 2016, Bolden was unopposed in the general election, winning 6,256 votes.
- In 2018, Bolden won the Democratic primary with 1,169 votes (59.7%) against Ugundi Jacobs Sr. She was unopposed in the general election, winning 4,693 votes.
- In 2024, Bolden was unopposed in the general election, receiving 6,590 votes.

== Committee assignments ==
Bolden is currently assigned to the following committees:

- House Veterans Affairs Committee
- Joint Finance Committee
- Appropriations Committee
- Economic Development/Banking/Insurance/Commerce Committee
- House Education Committee
- Gaming & Parimutuels Committee (Vice Chair)
- Housing & Community Affairs Committee (Vice Chair)
- House Labor Committee
- Revenue & Finance Committee (Chair)
