= Sean Lynn (politician) =

American politician from Delaware

Member of the Delaware House of Representatives from the 31st district
- Incumbent
- Assumed office November 8, 2014
- Preceded by: Darryl M. Scott

Personal details
- Born: Dover, Delaware, U.S.
- Party: Democratic
- Education: Marymount Manhattan College; Pace Law School
- Occupation: Lawyer
- Website: Official website

Sean Lynn is an American politician. He is a Democratic member of the Delaware House of Representatives, representing District 31.

Lynn was raised in Dover, Delaware and graduated from Dover High School. After attending Marymount Manhattan College, he was a public school teacher in the Bronx for several years before attending law school at Pace University. He has been a member of the Delaware Bar since 2005.

Lynn was on the Dover City Council from 2011 to 2014, where he worked on open government and public safety issues. In 2014, he was elected to the Delaware House of Representatives to replace retiring Democrat Darryl M. Scott.

== Electoral history ==
- In 2014, Lynn won the Democratic primary with 482 votes (60.7%) against Ralph Leroy Taylor Jr. He went on to win the general election with 2,609 votes (53.3%) against Republican nominee Samuel Chick.
- In 2016, Lynn won the general election with 5,256 votes (66.6%) against Republican nominee M. Jean Dowding.
- In 2018, Lynn won the Democratic primary with 1,225 votes (62.3%) in a rematch against Ralph Taylor. He went on to win the general election with 4,675 votes (65.5%) against Republican nominee David Levi Anderson.
