= Eric Morrison =

American politician

Member of the Delaware House of Representatives from the 27th district
- Incumbent
- Assumed office November 4, 2020
- Preceded by: Earl Jaques Jr.

Personal details
- Born: Salisbury, Maryland, U.S.
- Party: Democratic
- Other political affiliations: Democratic Socialists of America; Working Families Party
- Education: University of Delaware (BA)

Eric Morrison is an American politician serving as a member of the Delaware House of Representatives from the 27th district. He assumed office in November 2020.

A member of the progressive wing of the Democratic Party, Morrison defeated conservative Democrat Earl Jaques Jr. in the 2020 primary by a 61%-39% margin.

== Early life and education ==
Morrison was born in Salisbury, Maryland and raised in Bridgeville, Delaware. He earned a Bachelor of Arts degree in English with a minor in history from the University of Delaware in 1996.

== Career ==
After graduating from college, Morrison worked as a teacher. He later became a human resources director.

Morrison won the Democratic primary for the 27th district of Delaware House of Representatives against incumbent Earl Jaques Jr., a Democrat who had voted against gay marriage and abstained on banning conversion therapy for minors in Delaware. During the primary process, Jaques had attacked Morrison for performing in drag at a campaign fundraiser and said that Morrison being gay was "so far off-base for our district, it’s unbelievable." Jaques was forced to apologize to Morrison after his comments were criticized by Democratic leadership. Morrison was listed among a "slate of insurgents" aligned with the progressive wing of the Democratic Party challenging moderate incumbents in Delaware.

== Personal life ==
Morrison is the first openly gay man elected to serve in Delaware General Assembly, after Senator Karen E. Peterson came out in 2013 while in office. He was one of three LGBT candidates to be elected to the Delaware General Assembly in 2020, alongside Marie Pinkney and Sarah McBride.
