= Timothy Dukes =

American politician

Tim Dukes

Minority Leader of the Delaware House of Representatives
- Incumbent
- Assumed office November 12, 2024
- Preceded by: Mike Ramone

Member of the Delaware House of Representatives from the 40th district
- Incumbent
- Assumed office November 7, 2012
- Preceded by: Clifford Lee

Personal details
- Born: September 30, 1964 (age 61) Seaford, Delaware, U.S.
- Party: Republican
- Education: University of Valley Forge (BS)
- Website: Campaign website

Timothy D. "Tim" Dukes (born September 30, 1964) is an American politician. He is a Republican member of the Delaware House of Representatives, representing district 40.

== Career ==
Dukes was first elected to the Delaware House of Representatives in 2012 after the retirement of Republican Clifford Lee. He was elected minority leader in the House in November 2024.

== Electoral history ==
- In 2012, Dukes won the general election with 5,552 votes (62.7%) against Democratic nominee Benjamin Lowe.
- In 2014, Dukes was unopposed in the general election and won 4,306 votes.
- In 2016, Dukes was unopposed in the general election and won 7,826 votes.
- In 2018, Dukes was unopposed in the general election and won 5,848 votes.

Delaware House of Representatives
Preceded by Mike Ramone	Minority Leader of the Delaware House of Representatives; 2025–present	Incumbent
