= Melissa Minor-Brown =

American politician from Delaware (born 1984)

Speaker of the Delaware House of Representatives
- Incumbent
- Assumed office January 14, 2025
- Preceded by: Valerie Longhurst

Majority Leader of the Delaware House of Representatives
- In office June 30, 2023 – January 14, 2025
- Preceded by: Valerie Longhurst
- Succeeded by: Kerri Harris

Member of the Delaware House of Representatives from the 17th district
- Incumbent
- Assumed office November 7, 2018
- Preceded by: Michael Mulrooney

Personal details
- Born: April 19, 1984 (age 42) Philadelphia, Pennsylvania, U.S.
- Party: Democratic
- Education: Delaware Technical Community College (attended); Wilmington University (BS, MS)
- Website: Campaign website

Melissa C. Minor-Brown (born April 19, 1984) is an American politician and a member of the Democratic Party. She serves in the Delaware House of Representatives representing the 17th district. Since January 2025, she has served as the speaker and previously served as Majority Leader.

== Elections ==
In 2018, Minor-Brown won her primary with 56.7% of the vote. Running unopposed in the general election, she replaced retiring Democrat Michael Mulrooney.

In 2020, Minor-Brown defeated Independent candidate Timothy Collins with 96% of the vote.

Delaware House of Representatives
Preceded by Valerie Longhurst	Majority Leader of the Delaware House of Representatives; 2023–2025	Succeeded by Kerri Harris
Political offices
Preceded by Valerie Longhurst	Speaker of the Delaware House of Representatives; 2025–present	Incumbent
