= Delaware House of Representatives =

Lower house of U.S. state legislature

- Delaware General Assembly

Type
- Type: Lower house
- Term limits: None

History
- New session started: January 10, 2023

Leadership
- Speaker: Melissa Minor-Brown (D) since January 14, 2025
- Majority Leader: Kerri Evelyn Harris (D) since January 14, 2025
- Minority Leader: Tim Dukes (R) since January 14, 2025

Structure
- Seats: 41
- Political groups: Majority: Democratic (30); Minority: Republican (11)
- Length of term: 2 years
- Authority: Article III, Section 1, Delaware Constitution
- Salary: $48,237/year

Elections
- Last election: November 5, 2024 (41 seats)
- Next election: November 3, 2026 (41 seats)
- Redistricting: Legislative Control

Meeting place
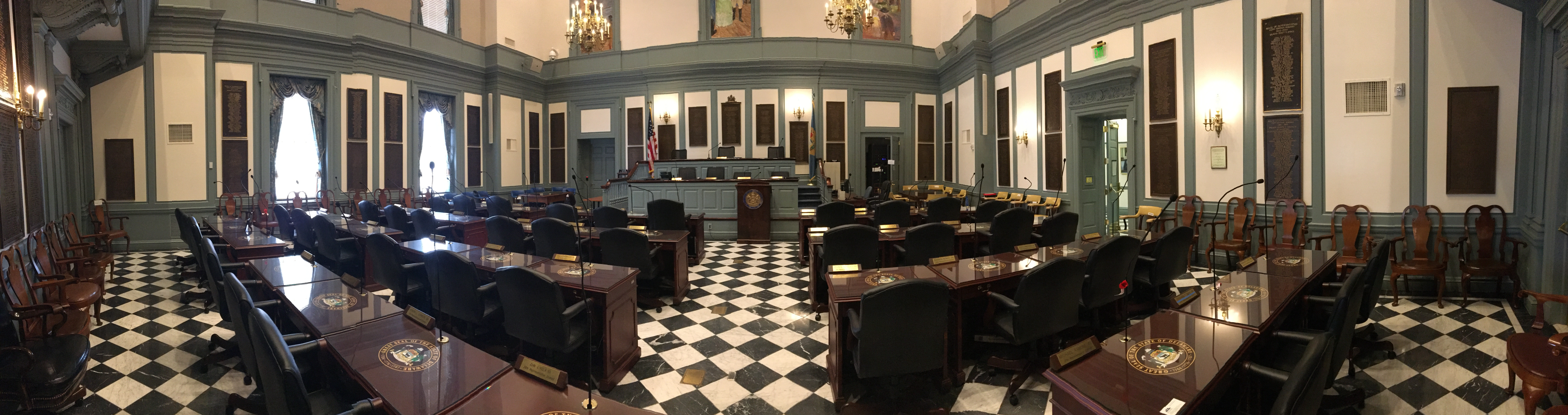
- House of Representatives Chamber; Delaware Legislative Hall; Dover, Delaware

Website
- Delaware House of Representatives

The Delaware State House of Representatives is the lower house of the Delaware General Assembly, the state legislature of the U.S. state of Delaware. It is composed of 41 Representatives from an equal number of constituencies, each of whom is elected to a two-year term. Its members are not subject to term limits, and their terms start the day after the election. The House meets at the Delaware Legislative Hall in Dover.

== Name ==
From 1776 to 1792, the chamber was known as the House of Assembly, a common name for lower houses of colonial legislatures and states under the Confederation. The name was changed by Delaware's 1792 Constitution, reflecting the new federal House of Representatives. This change on the part of Delaware initiated a movement that has resulted in a majority of the lower houses of U.S. state legislatures sharing the name of the federal House of Representatives.

== Leadership ==
The Speaker of the House presides over the House of Representatives. The Speaker is elected by the majority party caucus followed by confirmation of the full House through the passage of a House Resolution. The Speaker is the chief leadership position of the body. The other House leaders are elected by their respective party caucuses. The Majority Leader determines which bills are brought to the floor for debate from an Agenda prepared by the Speaker of the House and manages debates and floor votes.

Terry Spence (R) was the longest serving speaker in the history of the Delaware General Assembly. Valerie Longhurst was the first woman to serve as speaker and current speaker Melissa Minor-Brown, is the first Black woman in the role.

| Office | Representative | Party | District |
|---|---|---|---|
| Speaker of the House | Melissa Minor-Brown | Democratic | 17 |
| Majority Leader | Kerri Evelyn Harris | Democratic | 32 |
| Majority Whip | Edward Osienski | Democratic | 24 |
| Minority Leader | Timothy Dukes | Republican | 40 |
| Minority Whip | Jeffrey Spiegelman | Republican | 11 |

== Qualifications ==
Members of the House of Representatives must be citizens of the United States, have lived in Delaware for three years, been a resident of their constituent district for at least one year preceding their election, and must be at least 24 years old by the time of their election.

In 2015, the House was found to have the lowest educational level of United States state legislatures.

== Current composition ==
| Affiliation | Party (Shading indicates majority caucus) | | Total | Vacant |
| Affiliation | Democratic | Republican | Total | Vacant |
|---|---|---|---|---|
| End of previous session | 27 | 14 | 41 | 0 |
| November 4, 2026 | 30 | 11 | 41 | 0 |
| Latest voting share | 73.2% | 26.8% | | |

=== Current members ===
| District | Name | Party | Start | Residence | County |
|---|---|---|---|---|---|
| 1 | Nnamdi Chukwuocha | Democratic | 2018 | Wilmington | New Castle |
| 2 | Stephanie Bolden | Democratic | 2010 | Wilmington | New Castle |
| 3 | Josue Ortega | Democratic | 2024 | Wilmington | New Castle |
| 4 | Jeff Hilovsky | Republican | 2022 | Long Neck | Sussex |
| 5 | Kendra Johnson | Democratic | 2018 | New Castle | New Castle |
| 6 | Debra Heffernan | Democratic | 2010 | Wilmington | New Castle |
| 7 | Larry Lambert | Democratic | 2020 | Claymont | New Castle |
| 8 | Sherae'a Moore | Democratic | 2020 | Middletown | New Castle |
| 9 | Kevin Hensley | Republican | 2014 | Townsend | New Castle |
| 10 | Melanie Ross Levin | Democratic | 2024 | Wilmington | New Castle |
| 11 | Jeffrey Spiegelman | Republican | 2012 | Clayton | Kent, New Castle |
| 12 | Krista Griffith | Democratic | 2018 | Wilmington | New Castle |
| 13 | DeShanna Neal | Democratic | 2022 | Wilmington | New Castle |
| 14 | Claire Snyder-Hall | Democratic | 2024 | Rehoboth Beach | Sussex |
| 15 | Kamela Smith | Democratic | 2024 | Bear | New Castle |
| 16 | Franklin Cooke Jr. | Democratic | 2018 | Wilmington | New Castle |
| 17 | Melissa Minor-Brown | Democratic | 2018 | New Castle | New Castle |
| 18 | Sophie Phillips | Democratic | 2022 | Bear | New Castle |
| 19 | Kimberly Williams | Democratic | 2012 | Wilmington | New Castle |
| 20 | Alonna Berry | Democratic | 2025 (Note: Originally elected in a special election.) | Milton | Sussex |
| 21 | Frank Burns | Democratic | 2024 | Newark | New Castle |
| 22 | Michael Smith | Republican | 2018 | Newark | New Castle |
| 23 | Mara Gorman | Democratic | 2024 | Newark | New Castle |
| 24 | Edward Osienski | Democratic | 2010 | Newark | New Castle |
| 25 | Cyndie Romer | Democratic | 2022 | Newark | New Castle |
| 26 | Madinah Wilson-Anton | Democratic | 2020 | Newark | New Castle |
| 27 | Eric Morrison | Democratic | 2020 | Newark | New Castle |
| 28 | William Carson Jr. | Democratic | 2007 | Smyrna | Kent |
| 29 | William Bush IV | Democratic | 2018 | Camden | Kent |
| 30 | Shannon Morris | Republican | 2018 | Camden | Kent |
| 31 | Sean Lynn | Democratic | 2014 | Dover | Kent |
| 32 | Kerri Evelyn Harris | Democratic | 2022 | Dover | Kent |
| 33 | Charles Postles Jr. | Republican | 2016 | Milford | Kent |
| 34 | Lyndon Yearick | Republican | 2014 | Magnolia | Kent |
| 35 | Jesse Vanderwende | Republican | 2018 | Bridgeville | Sussex |
| 36 | Bryan Shupe | Republican | 2018 | Milford | Sussex |
| 37 | Valerie Jones Giltner | Republican | 2024 | Georgetown | Sussex |
| 38 | Ronald Gray | Republican | 2012 | Selbyville | Sussex |
| 39 | Daniel Short | Republican | 2006 | Seaford | Sussex |
| 40 | Timothy Dukes | Republican | 2012 | Laurel | Sussex |
| 41 | Richard Collins | Republican | 2014 | Millsboro | Sussex |

== See also ==
- Delaware Senate
