= Same-sex marriage in Delaware =

Same-sex marriage has been legally recognized in Delaware since July 1, 2013. Governor Jack Markell signed legislation legalizing same-sex marriage on May 7, 2013, just hours after its passage in the Delaware House of Representatives and Senate. The bill had been introduced to the Delaware General Assembly the previous month, and was approved 23–18 in the House and 12–9 in the Senate. Delaware was the eleventh U.S. state, (Note: After Massachusetts, Connecticut, Iowa, Vermont, New Hampshire, New York, Washington, Maine, Maryland and California) and the twelfth U.S. jurisdiction (after the District of Columbia), to allow same-sex couples to marry, preceding Minnesota and Rhode Island by one month. Polling suggests that a majority of Delaware residents support the legal recognition of same-sex marriage, with a 2024 Public Religion Research Institute poll showing that 61% of respondents supported same-sex marriage.

Delaware previously extended recognition to same-sex relationships in the form of civil unions, which granted same-sex couples the "rights, benefits, protections, and responsibilities" of married spouses. Civil unions became available in Delaware on January 1, 2012, following the passage of legislation in the General Assembly and promulgation by Governor Markell in May 2011. The ability to enter into civil unions was closed off following the legalization of same-sex marriage.

== Civil unions ==
In March 2011, senators David Sokola and Melanie George Smith introduced a civil union bill to the Delaware General Assembly. It would provide civil partners the "rights, benefits, protections, and responsibilities" of marriage, but under a different name. The measure passed the Senate Administrative Services Committee on March 31, and the Senate by a vote of 13–6 on April 7. It subsequently passed the House of Representatives in a 26–15 vote on April 14. Governor Jack Markell signed it into law on May 11, and it took effect on January 1, 2012. At the signing, he said:

Tonight, with the signing of this law, we say to any Delawarean, regardless of sexual orientation, if you have committed yourself to somebody, and you've made that pledge to spend your life together in partnership, your love is equally valid and deserving, your family is now equal under the law.

Approximately 565 civil union licenses were issued in 2012, with 250 of these being issued in Sussex County, 235 in New Castle County, and 80 in Kent County. The ability to enter into civil unions was closed off on July 1, 2013, and all civil unions were automatically converted to marriages on July 1, 2014, unless dissolved or converted earlier.

== Same-sex marriage ==
Same-sex marriage in the United States

=== Passage of legislation in 2013 ===
In March 2012, Governor Jack Markell said he thought that the legalization of same-sex marriage in Delaware was "inevitable" and would be enacted "probably within the next few years". In September 2012, Representative Peter Schwartzkopf, who became house speaker in January 2013, said he expected the General Assembly to vote on same-sex marriage in 2013 and that he would support it, but was uncertain of the legislation's prospects. On February 1, 2013, in anticipation of legislative activity, Francis Malooly, the Roman Catholic Bishop of Wilmington, authored a letter to parishioners stating that marriage was a covenant between "a man and a woman" that must be "cherished and defended".

In April 2013, a bill was introduced to the General Assembly to legalize same-sex marriage while eliminating civil unions and converting them to marriages by July 2014 if not dissolved earlier. Malooly wrote a letter to legislators on April 15 that said that marriage is not "just about love and commitment between two people" as many think but "it is also about the unique expression of love that only and man and woman as husband and wife can give to each other", that marriage is not a "label" but a "communion" that "is impossible without the sexual difference". The Delaware House Administration Committee advanced the bill to the House on April 18. Governor Markell said he would sign it if it passed. It passed the House on April 23 on a 23–18 vote. The Senate Executive Committee approved the legislation on May 1, and it passed the Senate on May 7 on a 12–9 vote. Markell signed the bill outside the Assembly building within an hour of the vote.

April 23, 2013 vote in the House of Representatives
| Political affiliation | Voted for | Voted against | Absent (Did not vote) |
|---|---|---|---|
| Democratic Party | 22: Michael Barbieri; Paul Baumbach; Andria Bennett; Stephanie Bolden; Gerald Brady; Debra Heffernan; James Johnson; S. Quinton Johnson; Helene Keeley; John Kowalko; Valerie Longhurst; John Mitchell Jr.; Michael Mulrooney; Edward Osienski; Peter Schwartzkopf; Darryl M. Scott; Bryon Short; Melanie George Smith; John Viola; Rebecca Walker; Dennis E. Williams; Kimberly Williams | 5: John C. Atkins; William Carson Jr.; Earl Jaques Jr.; W. Charles Paradee; Charles Potter Jr. | – |
| Republican Party | 1: Mike Ramone | 13: Donald Blakey; Ruth Briggs King; Timothy Dukes; Ronald E. Gray; Deborah Hudson; Harvey Kenton; Joseph Miró; William Outten; Harold Peterman; Daniel Short; Stephen Smyk; Jeffrey Spiegelman; David L. Wilson | – |
| Total | 23 | 18 | 0 |
| Total | 56.1% | 43.9% | 0.0% |

May 7, 2013 vote in the Senate
| Political affiliation | Voted for | Voted against | Absent (Did not vote) |
|---|---|---|---|
| Democratic Party | 11: Patricia Blevins; Brian Bushweller; Bethany Hall-Long; Margaret Rose Henry; Robert I. Marshall; David McBride; Harris McDowell III; Karen E. Peterson; Nicole Poore; David Sokola; Bryan Townsend | 2: Bruce Ennis; Robert Venables Sr. | – |
| Republican Party | 1: Catherine Cloutier | 7: Colin Bonini; Gerald Hocker; Gregory Lavelle; David G. Lawson; Ernesto Lopez; Brian G. Pettyjohn; F. Gary Simpson | – |
| Total | 12 | 9 | 0 |
| Total | 57.1% | 42.9% | 0.0% |

The legislation was titled An act to amend Title 13 of the Delaware code relating to domestic relations to provide for same-gender civil marriage and to convert existing civil unions to civil marriages. It also gave Delaware courts authority over divorce proceedings in the case of same-sex couples married in Delaware who resided in states that would not grant them a divorce because it did not recognize their marriages. Since June 26, 2015, same-sex marriage is legal throughout the United States, rendering this provision moot. The bill added the following section to the state's marriage statute:

All laws of this State applicable to marriage or married spouses or the children of married spouses, whether derived from statutes, administrative rules or regulations, court rules, governmental policies, common law, court decisions, or any other provisions or sources of law, including in equity, shall apply equally to same-gender and different-gender married couples and their children. [Del. Code tit. 13 § 129]

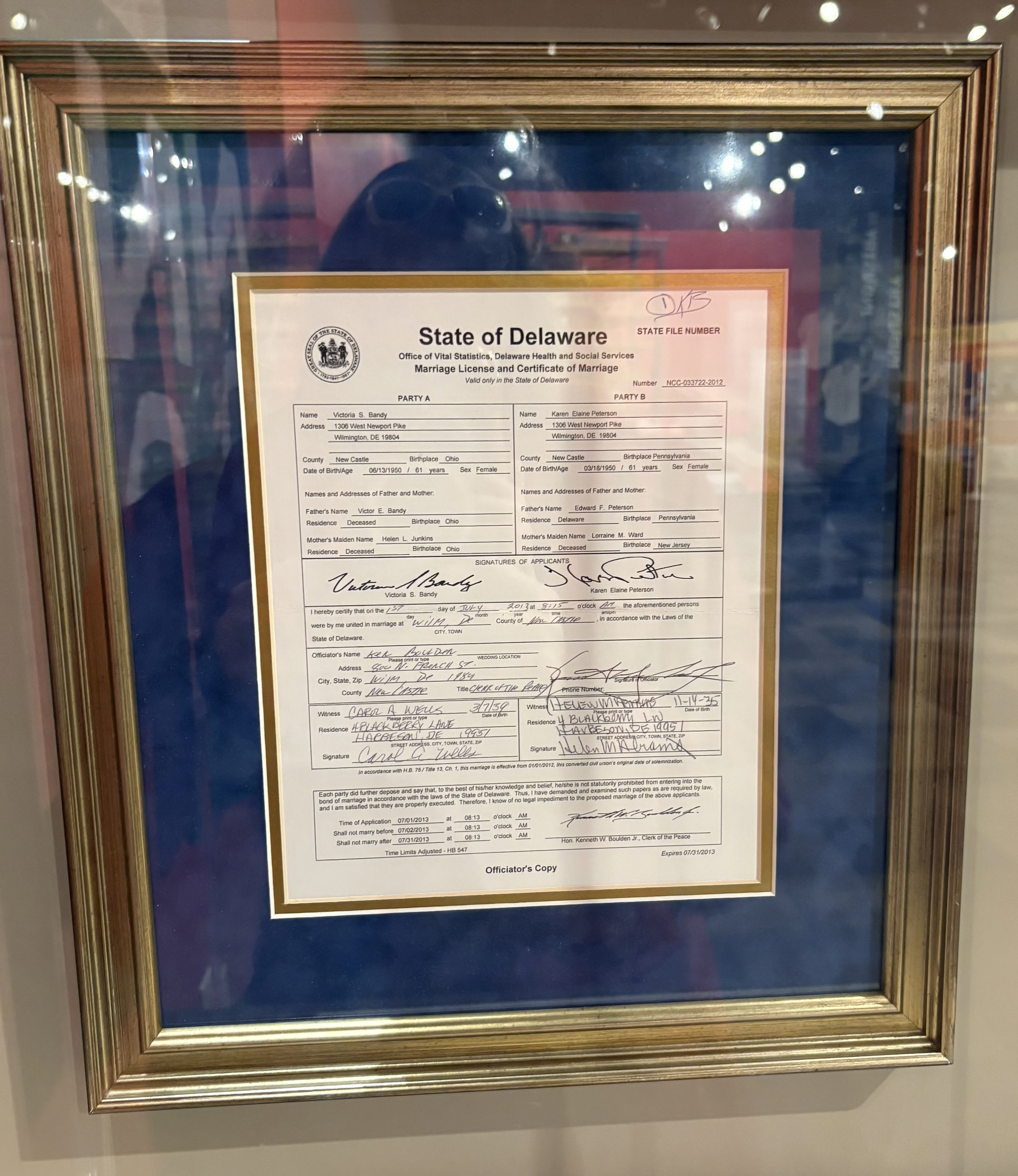
Delaware's first same-sex marriage license, issued to Victoria Bandy and Karen Peterson

State Senator Karen Peterson came out as lesbian during the debate on May 7, becoming the state's first-ever openly LGBTQ legislator. When the statute took effect on July 1, Peterson and her partner were the first same-sex couple to legally convert their civil union into a marriage. The first same-sex couple to marry were Joseph Daigle and Dan Cole, in a semi-public ceremony attended by hundreds and officiated by Clerk of the Peace Ken Boulden on July 1, at Gibraltar in Wilmington. Opening remarks for the first marriage were provided by Attorney General Beau Biden, and an invocation was provided by Rector of the Trinity Episcopal Church Pat Downing. Daigle and Cole were activists heavily involved in the process of passage, and Cole worked on writing and implementing the law.

=== Developments after legalization and constitutional amendment ===
A bill removing "homosexuality" and "lesbianism" from the statutory definition of misconduct which could be used as grounds for divorce was introduced to the General Assembly on March 13, 2016. The bill passed the House on May 10 in a 36–4 vote, and the Senate on June 9 in a unanimous 21–0 vote. Governor Markell signed the bill into law on June 28.

On June 10, 2025, the Senate passed a constitutional amendment enshrining same-sex marriage in the Constitution of Delaware. The proposed amendment, which passed by 16 votes to 5, would establish that the right to marry cannot be denied on the basis of gender or other protected characteristics, such as race, color, national origin and sex. "Like so many of my fellow Delawareans, my marriage is one of the most important things to me. It is only right that we fight to preserve this right for all our neighbors — no matter what," said Senator Russ Huxtable. Amending the Delaware Constitution requires a two-thirds majority in both chambers of the General Assembly in two consecutive legislative sessions; however, Democrats held 27 seats in the House, one seat shy of the two-thirds majority. On June 23, 2026, the amendment failed to pass the House, receiving 24 votes in favor of passage to 3 against. The vote was rescinded the following week, and a second vote was held on June 30, when the legislation passed 28–12, reaching the two-thirds majority needed to amend the Constitution. The second leg of voting needs to be approved by the end of June 2028.

June 10, 2025 vote in the Senate
| Political affiliation | Voted for | Voted against | Absent (Did not vote) |
|---|---|---|---|
| Democratic Party | 15: Darius Brown; Dan Cruce; Stephanie Hansen; Kyra Hoffner; Russ Huxtable; Elizabeth Lockman; Spiros Mantzavinos; Trey Paradee; Marie Pinkney; Nicole Poore; Ray Seigfried; David Sokola; Laura Sturgeon; Bryan Townsend; Jack Walsh | – | – |
| Republican Party | 1: Eric Buckson | 5: Gerald Hocker; David Lawson; Brian Pettyjohn; Bryant Richardson; David Wilson | – |
| Total | 16 | 5 | 0 |
| Total | 76.2% | 23.8% | 0.0% |

June 30, 2026 vote in the House of Representatives
| Political affiliation | Voted for | Voted against | Absent (Did not vote) |
|---|---|---|---|
| Democratic Party | 27: Alonna Berry; Stephanie Bolden; Frank Burns; William Bush IV; William Carson Jr.; Nnamdi Chukwuocha; Franklin Cooke Jr.; Mara Gorman; Krista Griffith; Kerri Evelyn Harris; Debra Heffernan; Kendra Johnson; Larry Lambert; Sean Lynn; Melissa Minor-Brown; Sherae'a Moore; Eric Morrison; DeShanna Neal; Josue Ortega; Edward Osienski; Sophie Phillips; Cyndie Romer; Melanie Ross Levin; Kamela Smith; Claire Snyder-Hall; Kimberly Williams; Madinah Wilson-Anton | – | – |
| Republican Party | 1: Michael Smith | 12: Richard Collins; Timothy Dukes; Valerie Jones Giltner; Ronald Gray; Kevin Hensley; Jeff Hilovsky; Charles Postles Jr.; Daniel Short; Bryan Shupe; Jeffrey Spiegelman; Jesse Vanderwende; Lyndon Yearick | 1: Shannon Morris |
| Total | 28 | 12 | 1 |
| Total | 68.3% | 29.3% | 2.4% |

=== Demographics and marriage statistics ===
2,092 marriage licenses were issued to same-sex couples from July 2013 to June 2014, representing around 26% of all licenses issued statewide. Around 37% and 10% of marriages in Sussex and Kent counties were to same-sex couples, respectively. The high percentage is mostly attributed to same-sex marriage not being legal in the neighbouring states of New Jersey and Pennsylvania at the time. The 2020 U.S. census showed that there were 3,194 married same-sex couple households (1,428 male couples and 1,766 female couples) and 1,679 unmarried same-sex couple households in Delaware.

== Public opinion ==
Public opinion for same-sex marriage in Delaware
| Poll source | Dates administered | Sample size | Margin of error | Support | Opposition | Do not know / refused |
|---|---|---|---|---|---|---|
| Public Religion Research Institute | February 28 – December 8, 2025 | 167 adults | ? | 60% | 35% | 5% |
| Public Religion Research Institute | March 13 – December 2, 2024 | 185 adults | ? | 61% | 34% | 5% |
| Public Religion Research Institute | March 9 – December 7, 2023 | 169 adults | ? | 62% | 35% | 3% |
| Public Religion Research Institute | March 11 – December 14, 2022 | ? | ? | 69% | 29% | 2% |
| Public Religion Research Institute | March 8 – November 9, 2021 | ? | ? | 66% | 32% | 2% |
| Public Religion Research Institute | January 7 – December 20, 2020 | 192 adults | ? | 60% | 29% | 11% |
| Public Religion Research Institute | April 5 – December 23, 2017 | 219 adults | ? | 58% | 27% | 15% |
| Public Religion Research Institute | May 18, 2016 – January 10, 2017 | 302 adults | ? | 62% | 25% | 13% |
| Public Religion Research Institute | April 29, 2015 – January 7, 2016 | 239 adults | ? | 66% | 25% | 9% |
| Public Religion Research Institute | April 2, 2014 – January 4, 2015 | 157 adults | ? | 57% | 31% | 12% |
| New York Times/CBS News/YouGov | September 20 – October 1, 2014 | 471 likely voters | ± 5.2% | 54% | 31% | 15% |
| Global Strategy Group | February 12–14, 2014 | 603 likely voters | ± 4.0% | 54% | 37% | 9% |
| Public Policy Polling | January 26–28, 2011 | 605 registered voters | ± 4.0% | 48% | 47% | 5% |

== See also ==
- LGBTQ rights in Delaware
- Same-sex marriage law in the United States by state
- Same-sex marriage in the United States
