= 2024 Delaware House of Representatives election =

2024 Delaware House of Representatives elections
- November 5, 2024

All 41 seats in the Delaware House of Representatives 21 seats needed for a majority
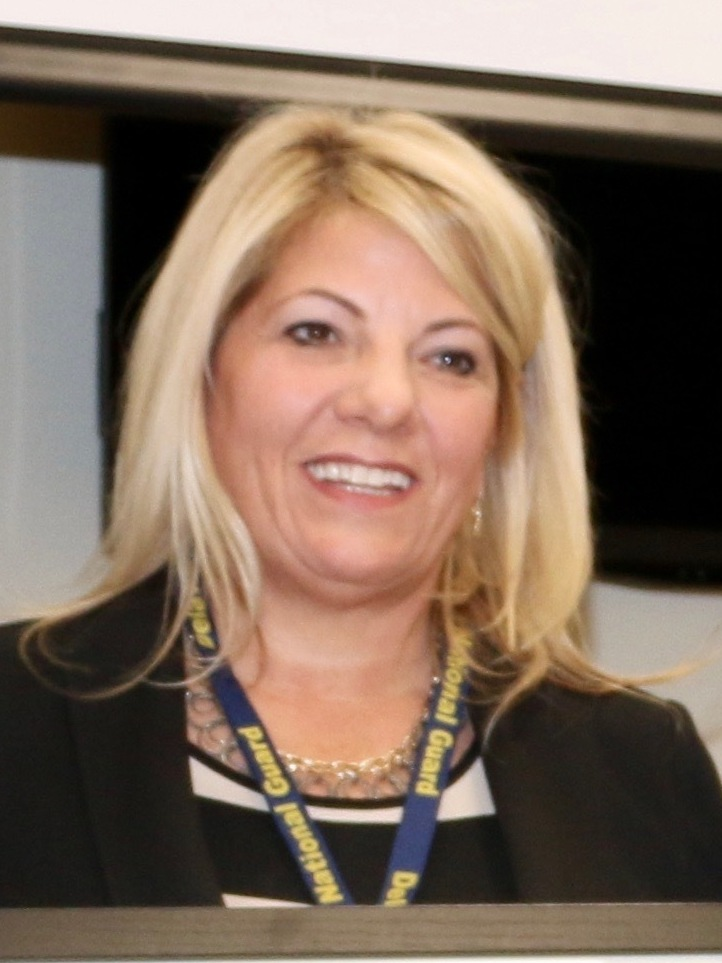

	Majority party	Minority party
Leader	Val Longhurst (lost renomination)	Mike Ramone (retired)
Party	Democratic	Republican
Leader since	June 30, 2023	January 10, 2023
Leader's seat	15th - Bear	21st - Newark
Last election	26	15
Seats won	27	14
Seat change	▲1	▼1
Popular vote	246,413	206,761
Percentage	54.37%	45.63%
Swing	▲2.93%	▼2.05%
- Results: Democratic gain Democratic hold Republican hold
Speaker before election
Val Longhurst
Democratic
Elected Speaker
Melissa Minor-Brown (Note: Nominated Speaker-elect by Democratic Caucus, did not officially take office until January 14, 2025.)
Democratic

The 2024 Delaware House of Representatives election was held on November 5, 2024, alongside the 2024 United States elections.

== Retirements ==
Five incumbents did not seek re-election.

=== Democrats ===
1. District 3: Sherry Dorsey Walker retired to run for Lieutenant Governor.
2. District 10: Sean Matthews retired.
3. District 14: Peter Schwartzkopf retired.
4. District 23: Paul Baumbach retired.

=== Republicans ===
1. District 21: Mike Ramone retired to run for Governor.

== Incumbents defeated ==
=== In primary election ===
One incumbent representative, a Democrat, was defeated in the September 10 primary election.

==== Democrats ====
1. District 15: Val Longhurst lost renomination to Kamela Smith.

== Predictions ==
Source	Ranking	As of
Sabato's Crystal Ball	Safe D	May 19, 2022

== Results summary ==
District	Incumbent	Party	Elected	Party
1st	Nnamdi Chukwuocha	Dem	Nnamdi Chukwuocha	Dem
2nd	Stephanie Bolden	Dem	Stephanie Bolden	Dem
3rd	Sherry Dorsey Walker†	Dem	Josue Ortega	Dem
4th	Jeff Hilovsky	Rep	Jeff Hilovsky	Rep
5th	Kendra Johnson	Dem	Kendra Johnson	Dem
6th	Debra Heffernan	Dem	Debra Heffernan	Dem
7th	Larry Lambert	Dem	Larry Lambert	Dem
8th	Sherae'a Moore	Dem	Sherae'a Moore	Dem
9th	Kevin Hensley	Rep	Kevin Hensley	Rep
10th	Sean Matthews†	Dem	Melanie Ross Levin	Dem
11th	Jeffrey Spiegelman	Rep	Jeffrey Spiegelman	Rep
12th	Krista Griffith	Dem	Krista Griffith	Dem
13th	DeShanna Neal	Dem	DeShanna Neal	Dem
14th	Peter Schwartzkopf†	Dem	Claire Snyder-Hall	Dem
15th	Valerie Longhurst	Dem	Kamela Smith	Dem
16th	Franklin Cooke Jr.	Dem	Franklin Cooke Jr.	Dem
17th	Melissa Minor-Brown	Dem	Melissa Minor-Brown	Dem
18th	Sophie Phillips	Dem	Sophie Phillips	Dem
19th	Kimberly Williams	Dem	Kimberly Williams	Dem
20th	Stell Selby	Dem	Stell Selby	Dem
21st	Michael Ramone†	Rep	Frank Burns	Dem
22nd	Michael Smith	Rep	Michael Smith	Rep
23rd	Paul Baumbach†	Dem	Mara Gorman	Dem
24th	Edward Osienski	Dem	Edward Osienski	Dem
25th	Cyndie Romer	Dem	Cyndie Romer	Dem
26th	Madinah Wilson-Anton	Dem	Madinah Wilson-Anton	Dem
27th	Eric Morrison	Dem	Eric Morrison	Dem
28th	William Carson Jr.	Dem	William Carson Jr.	Dem
29th	William Bush IV	Dem	William Bush IV	Dem
30th	Shannon Morris	Rep	Shannon Morris	Rep
31st	Sean Lynn	Dem	Sean Lynn	Dem
32nd	Kerri Evelyn Harris	Dem	Kerri Evelyn Harris	Dem
33rd	Charles Postles Jr.	Rep	Charles Postles Jr.	Rep
34th	Lyndon Yearick	Rep	Lyndon Yearick	Rep
35th	Jesse Vanderwende	Rep	Jesse Vanderwende	Rep
36th	Bryan Shupe	Rep	Bryan Shupe	Rep
37th	Valerie Jones Giltner	Rep	Valerie Jones Giltner	Rep
38th	Ronald Gray	Rep	Ronald Gray	Rep
39th	Daniel Short	Rep	Daniel Short	Rep
40th	Timothy Dukes	Rep	Timothy Dukes	Rep
41st	Richard Collins	Rep	Richard Collins	Rep

† - Incumbent not seeking re-election

=== Statewide ===
Party	Candi- dates	Votes	%	Seats	+/–
Democratic	33	246,413	54.37%	27	▲1
Republican	29	206,761	45.63%	14	▼1
Total	62	453,174	100%	41	Steady

=== Closest races ===
Seats where the margin of victory was under 10%:

1. District 20, 1.40%
2. District 9, 5.52%
3. District 22, 9.54%

== Results ==
Results of the 2024 Delaware House of Representatives election by district:

=== 1st District ===
Incumbent Democrat Nnamdi Chukwuocha had represented the 1st District since 2018.

Delaware House of Representatives 1st district general election, 2024
Party	Candidate	Votes	%
Democratic	Nnamdi Chukwuocha (incumbent)	9,252	100%
Total votes		9,252	100%
Democratic hold			

=== 2nd District ===
Incumbent Democrat Stephanie Bolden had represented the 2nd District since 2010.

Delaware House of Representatives 2nd district general election, 2024
Party	Candidate	Votes	%
Democratic	Stephanie Bolden (incumbent)	6,590	100%
Total votes		6,590	100%
Democratic hold			

=== 3rd District ===
Incumbent Democrat Sherry Dorsey Walker ran for Lieutenant Governor. Democrat Jose Ortega won the open seat.

Delaware House of Representatives 3rd district general election, 2024
Party	Candidate	Votes	%
Democratic	Josue Ortega	6,307	100%
Total votes		6,307	100%
Democratic hold			

=== 4th District ===
Incumbent Republican Jeff Hilovsky had represented the 4th District since 2022.

Delaware House of Representatives 4th district general election, 2024
Party	Candidate	Votes	%
Republican	Jeff Hilovsky (incumbent)	10,533	57.99%
Democratic	Gregg Lindner	7,630	42.01%
Total votes		18,163	100%
Republican hold			

=== 5th District ===
Incumbent Democrat Kendra Johnson had represented the 5th District since 2018.

Delaware House of Representatives 5th district general election, 2024
Party	Candidate	Votes	%
Democratic	Kendra Johnson (incumbent)	8,214	100%
Total votes		8,214	100%
Democratic hold			

=== 6th District ===
Incumbent Democrat Debra Heffernan had represented the 6th District since 2018.

Delaware House of Representatives 6th district general election, 2024
Party	Candidate	Votes	%
Democratic	Debra Heffernan (incumbent)	8,766	65.65%
Republican	Michael Krawczuk	4,586	34.35%
Total votes		13,352	100%
Democratic hold			

=== 7th District ===
Incumbent Democrat Larry Lambert had represented the 7th District since 2020.

Delaware House of Representatives 7th district general election, 2024
Party	Candidate	Votes	%
Democratic	Larry Lambert (incumbent)	7,208	70.29%
Republican	Shane Stoneman	3,047	29.71%
Total votes		10,255	100%
Democratic hold			

=== 8th District ===
Incumbent Democrat Sherae'a Moore had represented the 8th District since 2020.

Delaware House of Representatives 8th district general election, 2024
Party	Candidate	Votes	%
Democratic	Sherae'a Moore (incumbent)	7,945	57.8%
Republican	Chris Beronio	5,800	42.2%
Total votes		13,745	100%
Democratic hold			

=== 9th District ===
Incumbent Republican Kevin Hensley had represented the 9th District since 2014.

Delaware House of Representatives 9th district general election, 2024
Party	Candidate	Votes	%
Republican	Kevin Hensley (incumbent)	8,762	52.76%
Democratic	Terrell Williams	7,844	47.24%
Total votes		16,606	100%
Republican hold			

=== 10th District ===
Incumbent Democrat Sean Matthews retired and had represented the 10th District since 2014. Democrat Melanie Ross Levin won the open seat.

Delaware House of Representatives 10th district general election, 2024
Party	Candidate	Votes	%
Democratic	Melanie Ross Levin	7,953	60.43%
Republican	Brent Burdge	5,208	39.57%
Total votes		13,161	100%
Democratic hold			

=== 11th District ===
Incumbent Republican Jeffrey Spiegelman had represented the 11th District since 2012.

Delaware House of Representatives 11th district general election, 2024
Party	Candidate	Votes	%
Republican	Jeffrey Spiegelman (incumbent)	9,896	100%
Total votes		9,896	100%
Republican hold			

=== 12th District ===
Incumbent Democrat Krista Griffith had represented the 12th District since 2018.

Delaware House of Representatives 12th district general election, 2024
Party	Candidate	Votes	%
Democratic	Krista Griffith (incumbent)	10,086	61.31%
Republican	Steve Pickering	6,364	38.69%
Total votes		16,450	100%
Democratic hold			

=== 13th District ===
Incumbent Democrat DeShanna Neal had represented the 13th District since 2022.

Delaware House of Representatives 13th district general election, 2024
Party	Candidate	Votes	%
Democratic	DeShanna Neal (incumbent)	5,516	56.27%
Republican	Danny Rappa	4,287	43.73%
Total votes		9,803	100%
Democratic hold			

=== 14th District ===
Incumbent Democrat Peter Schwartzkopf retired and had represented the 14th District since 2002. Democrat Claire Snyder-Hall won the open seat.

Delaware House of Representatives 14th district general election, 2024
Party	Candidate	Votes	%
Democratic	Claire Snyder-Hall	9,630	54.64%
Republican	Mike Simpler	7,995	43.73%
Total votes		17,625	100%
Democratic hold			

=== 15th District ===
Incumbent Democrat House Speaker Valerie Longhurst lost the primary and had represented the 15th District since 2004. Democrat Kamela Smith won the open seat.

Delaware House of Representatives 15th district general election, 2024
Party	Candidate	Votes	%
Democratic	Kamela Smith	9,286	100.00%
Total votes		9,286	100%
Democratic hold			

=== 16th District ===
Incumbent Democrat Franklin Cooke Jr. had represented the 16th District since 2018.

Delaware House of Representatives 16th district general election, 2024
Party	Candidate	Votes	%
Democratic	Franklin Cooke Jr. (incumbent)	8,092	100.00%
Total votes		8,092	100%
Democratic hold			

=== 17th District ===
Incumbent Democrat Melissa Minor-Brown had represented the 17th District since 2018.

Delaware House of Representatives 17th district general election, 2024
Party	Candidate	Votes	%
Democratic	Melissa Minor-Brown (incumbent)	7,956	100.00%
Total votes		7,956	100%
Democratic hold			

=== 18th District ===
Incumbent Democrat Sophie Phillips had represented the 18th District since 2022.

Delaware House of Representatives 18th district general election, 2024
Party	Candidate	Votes	%
Democratic	Sophie Phillips (incumbent)	7,760	100.00%
Total votes		7,760	100%
Democratic hold			

=== 19th District ===
Incumbent Democrat Kimberly Williams had represented the 19th District since 2012.

Delaware House of Representatives 19th district general election, 2024
Party	Candidate	Votes	%
Democratic	Kimberly Williams (incumbent)	6,964	62.85%
Republican	Alex Homich	4,117	37.15%
Total votes		11,081	100%
Democratic hold			

=== 20th District ===
Incumbent Democrat Stell Parker Selby had represented the 20th District since 2022.

Delaware House of Representatives 20th district general election, 2024
Party	Candidate	Votes	%
Democratic	Stell Parker Selby (incumbent)	8,857	50.70%
Republican	Nikki Miller	8,612	49.30%
Total votes		17,469	100%
Democratic hold			

=== 21st District ===
Incumbent Republican Michael Ramone retired to run for Governor and had represented the 21st District since 2008. Democrat Frank Burns won the open seat.

Delaware House of Representatives 21st district general election, 2024
Party	Candidate	Votes	%
Democratic	Frank Burns	7,415	57.88%
Republican	Brenda Mennella	5,397	42.12%
Total votes		12,812	100%
Democratic gain from Republican			

=== 22nd District ===
Incumbent Republican Michael Smith had represented the 22nd District since 2018.

Delaware House of Representatives 22nd district general election, 2024
Party	Candidate	Votes	%
Republican	Michael Smith (incumbent)	8,601	54.77%
Democratic	Monica Beard	7,103	45.23%
Total votes		15,704	100%
Republican hold			

=== 23rd District ===
Incumbent Democrat Paul Baumbach retired and had represented the 23rd District since 2012. Democrat Mara Gorman won the open seat.

Delaware House of Representatives 23rd district general election, 2024
Party	Candidate	Votes	%
Democratic	Mara Gorman	7,934	100.00%
Total votes		7,934	100%
Democratic hold			

=== 24th District ===
Incumbent Democrat Edward Osienski had represented the 24th District since 2010.

Delaware House of Representatives 24th district general election, 2024
Party	Candidate	Votes	%
Democratic	Edward Osienski (incumbent)	6,379	66.79%
Republican	Joan Godwin	3,172	33.21%
Total votes		9,551	100%
Democratic hold			

=== 25th District ===
Incumbent Democrat Cyndie Romer had represented the 25th District since 2022.

Delaware House of Representatives 25th district general election, 2024
Party	Candidate	Votes	%
Democratic	Cyndie Romer (incumbent)	5,969	64.92%
Republican	David Hansberger	3,225	35.08%
Total votes		9,194	100%
Democratic hold			

=== 26th District ===
Incumbent Democrat Madinah Wilson-Anton had represented the 26th District since 2020.

Delaware House of Representatives 26th district general election, 2024
Party	Candidate	Votes	%
Democratic	Madinah Wilson-Anton (incumbent)	7,123	100.00%
Total votes		7,123	100%
Democratic hold			

=== 27th District ===
Incumbent Democrat Eric Morrison had represented the 27th District since 2020.

Delaware House of Representatives 27th district general election, 2024
Party	Candidate	Votes	%
Democratic	Eric Morrison (incumbent)	7,766	56.21%
Republican	Kristina Griffing	6,051	43.79%
Total votes		13,817	100%
Democratic hold			

=== 28th District ===
Incumbent Democrat William Carson Jr. had represented the 28th District since 2008.

Delaware House of Representatives 28th district general election, 2024
Party	Candidate	Votes	%
Democratic	William Carson Jr. (incumbent)	8,620	100.00%
Total votes		8,620	100%
Democratic hold			

=== 29th District ===
Incumbent Democrat William Bush IV had represented the 29th District since 2018.

Delaware House of Representatives 29th district general election, 2024
Party	Candidate	Votes	%
Democratic	William Bush IV (incumbent)	8,746	61.83%
Republican	Anthony Egipciaco Jr.	5,400	38.17%
Total votes		14,146	100%
Democratic hold			

=== 30th District ===
Incumbent Republican Shannon Morris had represented the 30th District since 2018.

Delaware House of Representatives 30th district general election, 2024
Party	Candidate	Votes	%
Republican	Shannon Morris (incumbent)	10,118	100.00%
Total votes		10,118	100%
Republican hold			

=== 31st District ===
Incumbent Democrat Sean Lynn had represented the 31st District since 2014.

Delaware House of Representatives 31st district general election, 2024
Party	Candidate	Votes	%
Democratic	Sean Lynn (incumbent)	7,109	100.00%
Total votes		7,109	100%
Democratic hold			

=== 32nd District ===
Incumbent Democrat Kerri Evelyn Harris had represented the 32nd District since 2022.

Delaware House of Representatives 32nd district general election, 2024
Party	Candidate	Votes	%
Democratic	Kerri Evelyn Harris (incumbent)	4,786	61.91%
Republican	Amy Shampinato	2,945	38.09%
Total votes		7,731	100%
Democratic hold			

=== 33rd District ===
Incumbent Republican Charles Postles Jr. had represented the 33rd District since 2016.

Delaware House of Representatives 33rd district general election, 2024
Party	Candidate	Votes	%
Republican	Charles Postles Jr. (incumbent)	9,101	100.00%
Total votes		9,101	100%
Republican hold			

=== 34th District ===
Incumbent Republican Lyndon Yearick had represented the 34th District since 2014.

Delaware House of Representatives 34th district general election, 2024
Party	Candidate	Votes	%
Republican	Lyndon Yearick (incumbent)	7,165	55.34%
Democratic	Tracey M. Miller	5,782	44.66%
Total votes		12,947	100%
Republican hold			

=== 35th District ===
Incumbent Republican Jesse Vanderwende had represented the 35th District since 2018.

Delaware House of Representatives 35th district general election, 2024
Party	Candidate	Votes	%
Republican	Jesse Vanderwende (incumbent)	9,015	100.00%
Total votes		9,015	100%
Republican hold			

=== 36th District ===
Delaware House of Representatives 36th district general election, 2024
Party	Candidate	Votes	%
Republican	Bryan Shupe (incumbent)	7,757	62.86%
Democratic	Rony J. Baltazar-Lopez	4,583	37.14%
Total votes		12,340	100%
Republican hold			

=== 37th District ===
Incumbent Republican Valerie Jones Giltner had represented the 37th District since 2023.

Delaware House of Representatives 37th district general election, 2024
Party	Candidate	Votes	%
Republican	Valerie Jones Giltner (incumbent)	8,250	100.00%
Total votes		8,250	100%
Republican hold			

=== 38th District ===
Incumbent Republican Ronald Gray had represented the 38th District since 2012.

Delaware House of Representatives 38th district general election, 2024
Party	Candidate	Votes	%
Republican	Ronald Gray (incumbent)	15,341	100.00%
Total votes		15,341	100%
Republican hold			

=== 39th District ===
Incumbent Republican and Minority Leader Daniel Short had represented the 39th District since 2006.

Delaware House of Representatives 39th district general election, 2024
Party	Candidate	Votes	%
Republican	Daniel Short (incumbent)	7,440	100.00%
Total votes		7,440	100%
Republican hold			

=== 40th District ===
Incumbent Republican Timothy Dukes had represented the 40th District since 2012.

Delaware House of Representatives 40th district general election, 2024
Party	Candidate	Votes	%
Republican	Timothy Dukes (incumbent)	9,086	100.00%
Total votes		9,086	100%
Republican hold			

=== 41st District ===
Incumbent Republican Richard Collins had represented the 41st District since 2014.

Delaware House of Representatives 41st district general election, 2024
Party	Candidate	Votes	%
Republican	Richard Collins (incumbent)	9,490	64.42%
Democratic	Tom Brett	5,242	35.58%
Total votes		14,732	100%
Republican hold			
