= 2018 Delaware House of Representatives election =

- November 6, 2018

All 41 seats in the Delaware House of Representatives 21 seats needed for a majority
- Turnout: 52.20%
| | Majority party | Minority party |
|---|---|---|
| Leader | Peter Schwartzkopf | Daniel Short |
| Party | Democratic | Republican |
| Leader's seat | 14th - Rehoboth Beach | 39th - Seaford |
| Last election | 25 | 16 |
| Seats before | 25 | 15 |
| Seats won | 26 | 15 |
| Seat change | ▲1 | ▼1 |
| Popular vote | 199,716 | 135,694 |
| Percentage | 59.06% | 40.13% |
| Swing | ▼0.45% | ▲0.68% |
- Results by holds and gains Democratic hold Democratic gain Republican hold

- Results by vote share Democratic: 50–60% 60–70% 70–80% 80–90% 90–100% Republican: 50–60% 60–70% 90–100%
Speaker before election
Peter Schwartzkopf
Democratic
Elected Speaker
Peter Schwartzkopf
Democratic

An election was held on November 6, 2018, to elect all 41 members to Delaware's House of Representatives. The election coincided with the elections for other offices, including for the U.S. Senate, U.S. House of Representatives, attorney general, state treasurer, and state senate. The primary election was held on September 6, 2018. Democrats consolidated their majority in the House by gaining one seat, winning 26 seats compared to 15 seats for the Republicans.

== Results summary ==
| District | Incumbent | Party | Elected representative | Party |
|---|---|---|---|---|
| 1st | Charles Potter Jr. | Dem | Nnamdi Chukwuocha | Dem |
| 2nd | Stephanie Bolden | Dem | Stephanie Bolden | Dem |
| 3rd | Helene Keeley | Dem | Sherry Dorsey Walker | Dem |
| 4th | Gerald Brady | Dem | Gerald Brady | Dem |
| 5th | Melanie George Smith | Dem | Kendra Johnson | Dem |
| 6th | Debra Heffernan | Dem | Debra Heffernan | Dem |
| 7th | Bryon Short | Dem | Ray Seigfried | Dem |
| 8th | Quinn Johnson | Dem | Quinn Johnson | Dem |
| 9th | Kevin Hensley | Rep | Kevin Hensley | Rep |
| 10th | Sean Matthews | Dem | Sean Matthews | Dem |
| 11th | Jeffrey Spiegelman | Rep | Jeffrey Spiegelman | Rep |
| 12th | Deborah Hudson | Rep | Krista Griffith | Dem |
| 13th | Larry Mitchell | Dem | Larry Mitchell | Dem |
| 14th | Peter Schwartzkopf | Dem | Peter Schwartzkopf | Dem |
| 15th | Valerie Longhurst | Dem | Valerie Longhurst | Dem |
| 16th | J.J. Johnson | Dem | Franklin Cooke Jr. | Dem |
| 17th | Michael Mulrooney | Dem | Melissa Minor-Brown | Dem |
| 18th | David Bentz | Dem | David Bentz | Dem |
| 19th | Kimberly Williams | Dem | Kimberly Williams | Dem |
| 20th | Stephen Smyk | Rep | Stephen Smyk | Rep |
| 21st | Michael Ramone | Rep | Michael Ramone | Rep |
| 22nd | Joseph Miró | Rep | Michael Smith | Rep |
| 23rd | Paul Baumbach | Dem | Paul Baumbach | Dem |
| 24th | Edward Osienski | Dem | Edward Osienski | Dem |
| 25th | John Kowalko Jr. | Dem | John Kowalko Jr. | Dem |
| 26th | John Viola | Dem | John Viola | Dem |
| 27th | Earl Jaques Jr. | Dem | Earl Jaques Jr. | Dem |
| 28th | William Carson Jr. | Dem | William Carson Jr. | Dem |
| 29th | Charles Paradee | Dem | William Bush IV | Dem |
| 30th | William Outten | Rep | Shannon Morris | Rep |
| 31st | Sean Lynn | Dem | Sean Lynn | Dem |
| 32nd | Andria Bennett | Dem | Andria Bennett | Dem |
| 33rd | Charles Postles Jr. | Rep | Charles Postles Jr. | Rep |
| 34th | Lyndon Yearick | Rep | Lyndon Yearick | Rep |
| 35th | David Wilson | Rep | Jesse Vanderwende | Rep |
| 36th | Harvey Kenton | Rep | Bryan Shupe | Rep |
| 37th | Ruth Briggs King | Rep | Ruth Briggs King | Rep |
| 38th | Ronald Gray | Rep | Ronald Gray | Rep |
| 39th | Daniel Short | Rep | Daniel Short | Rep |
| 40th | Timothy Dukes | Rep | Timothy Dukes | Rep |
| 41st | Richard Collins | Rep | Richard Collins | Rep |

=== Statewide ===
| Party | Candi- dates | Votes | % | Seats | +/– |
|---|---|---|---|---|---|
| Democratic | 37 | 199,716 | 59.06% | 26 | ▲1 |
| Republican | 30 | 135,694 | 40.13% | 15 | ▼1 |
| Libertarian | 6 | 2,759 | 0.82% | 0 | – |
| Total | 73 | 338,169 | 100.00% | 41 | – |

=== Incumbents defeated in the general election ===
- Deborah Hudson (R-District 12), defeated by Krista Griffith (D)

== Predictions ==
| Source | Ranking | As of |
|---|---|---|
| Governing | Safe D | October 8, 2018 |

== Detailed results ==
Source for primary election results: Source for general election results:

=== District 1 ===
Incumbent Democrat Charles Potter Jr. had represented the 1st district since 2012. Potter lost re-nomination to fellow Democrat Nnamdi Chukwuocha, who went on to win the general election.

Democratic primary

Delaware House of Representatives 1st district Democratic primary election, 2018
| Party | Candidate | Votes | % |
|---|---|---|---|
| Democratic | Nnamdi Chukwuocha | 2,306 | 59.50% |
| Democratic | Charles Potter Jr. (incumbent) | 1,569 | 40.50% |
| Total votes | | 3,875 | 100% |

General election

Delaware House of Representatives 1st district general election, 2018
| Party | Candidate | Votes | % |
|---|---|---|---|
| Democratic | Nnamdi Chukwuocha | 7,640 | 100% |
| Total votes | | 7,640 | 100% |
| Democratic hold | | | |

=== District 2 ===
Incumbent Democrat Stephanie Bolden had represented the 2nd district since 2010.

Democratic primary

Delaware House of Representatives 2nd district Democratic primary election, 2018
| Party | Candidate | Votes | % |
|---|---|---|---|
| Democratic | Stephanie Bolden (incumbent) | 1,169 | 59.70% |
| Democratic | Ugundi Jacobs Sr. | 789 | 40.30% |
| Total votes | | 1,958 | 100% |

General election

Delaware House of Representatives 2nd district general election, 2018
| Party | Candidate | Votes | % |
|---|---|---|---|
| Democratic | Stephanie Bolden (incumbent) | 4,693 | 100% |
| Total votes | | 4,693 | 100% |
| Democratic hold | | | |

=== District 3 ===
Incumbent Democrat Helene Keeley had represented the 3rd district and its predecessors since 1996. Keeley did not seek re-election, and fellow Democrat Sherry Dorsey Walker won the open seat.

Democratic primary

Delaware House of Representatives 3rd district Democratic primary election, 2018
| Party | Candidate | Votes | % |
|---|---|---|---|
| Democratic | Sherry Dorsey Walker | 1,353 | 68.54% |
| Democratic | James Hunter Miller | 481 | 24.37% |
| Democratic | Paul J. Falkowski | 140 | 7.09% |
| Total votes | | 1,974 | 100% |

General election

Delaware House of Representatives 3rd district general election, 2018
| Party | Candidate | Votes | % |
|---|---|---|---|
| Democratic | Sherry Dorsey Walker | 4,434 | 100% |
| Total votes | | 4,434 | 100% |
| Democratic hold | | | |

=== District 4 ===
Incumbent Democrat Gerald Brady had represented the 4th district since 2006.

Delaware House of Representatives 4th district general election, 2018
| Party | Candidate | Votes | % |
|---|---|---|---|
| Democratic | Gerald Brady (incumbent) | 8,512 | 100% |
| Total votes | | 8,512 | 100% |
| Democratic hold | | | |

=== District 5 ===
Incumbent Democrat Melanie George Smith had represented the 5th district since 2002. Smith did not seek re-election, and fellow Democrat Kendra Johnson won the open seat.

Democratic primary

Delaware House of Representatives 5th district Democratic primary election, 2018
| Party | Candidate | Votes | % |
|---|---|---|---|
| Democratic | Kendra Johnson | 1,438 | 59.86% |
| Democratic | Ajawavi J. Ajavon | 658 | 27.39% |
| Democratic | William Resto Jr. | 306 | 12.75% |
| Total votes | | 2,402 | 100% |

General election

Delaware House of Representatives 5th district general election, 2018
| Party | Candidate | Votes | % |
|---|---|---|---|
| Democratic | Kendra Johnson | 6,824 | 100% |
| Total votes | | 6,824 | 100% |
| Democratic hold | | | |

=== District 6 ===
Incumbent Democrat Debra Heffernan had represented the 6th district since 2010.

Delaware House of Representatives 6th district general election, 2018
| Party | Candidate | Votes | % |
|---|---|---|---|
| Democratic | Debra Heffernan (incumbent) | 7,073 | 65.32% |
| Republican | Jeffrey Olmstead | 3,754 | 34.68% |
| Total votes | | 10,827 | 100% |
| Democratic hold | | | |

=== District 7 ===
Incumbent Democrat Bryon Short had represented the 7th district since 2006. Short did not seek re-election, and fellow Democrat Ray Seigfried won the open seat.

Democratic primary

Delaware House of Representatives 7th district Democratic primary election, 2018
| Party | Candidate | Votes | % |
|---|---|---|---|
| Democratic | Ray Seigfried | 762 | 28.71% |
| Democratic | Larry Lambert | 676 | 25.45% |
| Democratic | Joseph Daigle | 661 | 24.88% |
| Democratic | Catherine Imburgia | 300 | 11.29% |
| Democratic | Rose Izzo | 257 | 9.67% |
| Total votes | | 2,656 | 100% |

General election

Delaware House of Representatives 7th district general election, 2018
| Party | Candidate | Votes | % |
|---|---|---|---|
| Democratic | Ray Seigfried | 5,943 | 62.92% |
| Republican | Eric Braunstein | 3,348 | 35.44% |
| Libertarian | Scott Gesty | 154 | 1.64% |
| Total votes | | 9,445 | 100% |
| Democratic hold | | | |

=== District 8 ===
Incumbent Democrat Quinn Johnson had represented the 8th district since 2008.

Delaware House of Representatives 8th district general election, 2018
| Party | Candidate | Votes | % |
|---|---|---|---|
| Democratic | Quinn Johnson (incumbent) | 5,864 | 62.94% |
| Republican | Daniel Zitofsky | 3,334 | 35.78% |
| Libertarian | Cody McNutt | 118 | 1.28% |
| Total votes | | 9,316 | 100% |
| Democratic hold | | | |

=== District 9 ===
Incumbent Republican Kevin Hensley had represented the 9th district since 2014.

Democratic primary

Delaware House of Representatives 9th district Democratic primary election, 2018
| Party | Candidate | Votes | % |
|---|---|---|---|
| Democratic | Monique Johns | 1,204 | 50.14% |
| Democratic | Debbie Harrington | 754 | 31.40% |
| Democratic | James Ryan | 443 | 18.46% |
| Total votes | | 2,401 | 100% |

General election

Delaware House of Representatives 9th district general election, 2018
| Party | Candidate | Votes | % |
|---|---|---|---|
| Republican | Kevin Hensley (incumbent) | 6,961 | 58.70% |
| Democratic | Monique Johns | 4,899 | 41.30% |
| Total votes | | 11,860 | 100% |
| Republican hold | | | |

=== District 10 ===
Incumbent Democrat Sean Matthews had represented the 10th district since 2014.

Delaware House of Representatives 10th district general election, 2018
| Party | Candidate | Votes | % |
|---|---|---|---|
| Democratic | Sean Matthews (incumbent) | 6,448 | 68.69% |
| Republican | Erin Wienner | 2,938 | 31.31% |
| Total votes | | 9,386 | 100% |
| Democratic hold | | | |

=== District 11 ===
Incumbent Republican Jeffrey Spiegelman had represented the 11th district since 2012.

Delaware House of Representatives 11th district general election, 2018
| Party | Candidate | Votes | % |
|---|---|---|---|
| Republican | Jeffrey Spiegelman (incumbent) | 5,104 | 65.22% |
| Democratic | Paul Thornburg | 2,723 | 34.78% |
| Total votes | | 7,827 | 100% |
| Republican hold | | | |

=== District 12 ===
Incumbent Republican Deborah Hudson had represented the 12th district since 1994. Hudson lost re-election to Democrat Krista Griffith.

Democratic primary

Delaware House of Representatives 12th district Democratic primary election, 2018
| Party | Candidate | Votes | % |
|---|---|---|---|
| Democratic | Krista Griffith | 1,726 | 63.74% |
| Democratic | Rachel Blumenfeld | 982 | 36.26% |
| Total votes | | 2,708 | 100% |

General election

Delaware House of Representatives 12th district general election, 2018
| Party | Candidate | Votes | % |
|---|---|---|---|
| Democratic | Krista Griffith | 6,691 | 53.14% |
| Republican | Deborah Hudson (incumbent) | 5,898 | 46.86% |
| Total votes | | 12,589 | 100% |
| Democratic gain from Republican | | | |

=== District 13 ===
Incumbent Democrat Larry Mitchell had represented the 13th district since 2006.

Delaware House of Representatives 13th district general election, 2018
| Party | Candidate | Votes | % |
|---|---|---|---|
| Democratic | Larry Mitchell (incumbent) | 5,528 | 100% |
| Total votes | | 5,528 | 100% |
| Democratic hold | | | |

=== District 14 ===
Incumbent Democrat House Speaker Peter Schwartzkopf had represented the 14th district since 2002.

Delaware House of Representatives 14th district general election, 2018
| Party | Candidate | Votes | % |
|---|---|---|---|
| Democratic | Peter Schwartzkopf (incumbent) | 8,530 | 62.46% |
| Republican | James Demartino | 5,125 | 37.54% |
| Total votes | | 13,655 | 100% |
| Democratic hold | | | |

=== District 15 ===
Incumbent Democrat Valerie Longhurst had represented the 15th district since 2004.

Delaware House of Representatives 15th district general election, 2018
| Party | Candidate | Votes | % |
|---|---|---|---|
| Democratic | Valerie Longhurst (incumbent) | 7,329 | 87.87% |
| Libertarian | Amy Merlino | 1,011 | 12.13% |
| Total votes | | 8,340 | 100% |
| Democratic hold | | | |

=== District 16 ===
Incumbent Democrat J.J. Johnson had represented the 16th district since 2004. Johnson did not seek re-election, and fellow Democrat Franklin Cooke Jr. won the open seat.

Democratic primary

Delaware House of Representatives 16th district Democratic primary election, 2018
| Party | Candidate | Votes | % |
|---|---|---|---|
| Democratic | Franklin Cooke Jr. | 1,195 | 46.69% |
| Democratic | C. Linwood Jackson | 688 | 26.88% |
| Democratic | Jakim Mohammed | 676 | 26.43% |
| Total votes | | 2,559 | 100% |

General election

Delaware House of Representatives 16th district general election, 2018
| Party | Candidate | Votes | % |
|---|---|---|---|
| Democratic | Franklin Cooke Jr. | 5,765 | 85.38% |
| Republican | Albert John Ament | 987 | 14.62% |
| Total votes | | 6,752 | 100% |
| Democratic hold | | | |

=== District 17 ===
Incumbent Democrat Michael Mulrooney had represented the th district since 1998. Mulrroney did not seek re-election, and fellow Democrat Melissa Minor-Brown won the open seat.

Democratic primary

Delaware House of Representatives 17th district Democratic primary election, 2018
| Party | Candidate | Votes | % |
|---|---|---|---|
| Democratic | Melissa Minor-Brown | 1,329 | 56.89% |
| Democratic | Michael Burns | 565 | 24.18% |
| Democratic | David J. Roberts | 442 | 18.93% |
| Total votes | | 2,336 | 100% |

General election

Delaware House of Representatives 17th district general election, 2018
| Party | Candidate | Votes | % |
|---|---|---|---|
| Democratic | Melissa Minor-Brown | 6,107 | 100% |
| Total votes | | 6,107 | 100% |
| Democratic hold | | | |

=== District 18 ===
Incumbent Democrat David Bentz had represented the 18th district since 2015.

Delaware House of Representatives 18th district general election, 2018
| Party | Candidate | Votes | % |
|---|---|---|---|
| Democratic | David Bentz (incumbent) | 5,876 | 100% |
| Total votes | | 5,876 | 100% |
| Democratic hold | | | |

=== District 19 ===
Incumbent Democrat Kimberly Williams had represented the 19th district since 2012.

Delaware House of Representatives 19th district general election, 2018
| Party | Candidate | Votes | % |
|---|---|---|---|
| Democratic | Kimberly Williams (incumbent) | 4,891 | 65.86% |
| Republican | James Startzman Jr. | 2,535 | 34.14% |
| Total votes | | 7,426 | 100% |
| Democratic hold | | | |

=== District 20 ===
Incumbent Republican Stephen Smyk had represented the 20th district since 2012.

Delaware House of Representatives 20th district general election, 2018
| Party | Candidate | Votes | % |
|---|---|---|---|
| Republican | Stephen Smyk (incumbent) | 8,187 | 56.06% |
| Democratic | John Bucchioni | 6,281 | 43.01% |
| Libertarian | Harry R. Smouse Jr. | 134 | 0.93% |
| Total votes | | 14,602 | 100% |
| Republican hold | | | |

=== District 21 ===
Incumbent Republican Michael Ramone had represented the 21st district since 2008.

Delaware House of Representatives 21st district general election, 2018
| Party | Candidate | Votes | % |
|---|---|---|---|
| Republican | Michael Ramone (incumbent) | 5,114 | 52.09% |
| Democratic | Stephanie Barry | 4,705 | 47.91% |
| Total votes | | 9,819 | 100% |
| Republican hold | | | |

=== District 22 ===
Incumbent Republican Joseph Miró had represented the 22nd district since 1998. Miró did not seek re-election, and fellow Republican Michael Smith won the open seat.

Democratic primary

Delaware House of Representatives 22nd district Democratic primary election, 2018
| Party | Candidate | Votes | % |
|---|---|---|---|
| Democratic | Guillermina Gonzalez | 1,426 | 61.17% |
| Democratic | Renee Taschner | 905 | 38.83% |
| Total votes | | 2,331 | 100% |

Republican primary

Delaware House of Representatives 22nd district Republican primary election, 2018
| Party | Candidate | Votes | % |
|---|---|---|---|
| Republican | Michael Smith | 1,108 | 63.57% |
| Republican | Katherine Beard | 635 | 36.43% |
| Total votes | | 1,743 | 100% |

General election

Delaware House of Representatives 22nd district general election, 2018
| Party | Candidate | Votes | % |
|---|---|---|---|
| Republican | Michael Smith | 5,955 | 50.60% |
| Democratic | Guillermina Gonzalez | 5,815 | 49.40% |
| Total votes | | 11,770 | 100% |
| Republican hold | | | |

=== District 23 ===
Incumbent Democrat Paul Baumbach had represented the 23rd district since 2012.

Delaware House of Representatives 23rd district general election, 2018
| Party | Candidate | Votes | % |
|---|---|---|---|
| Democratic | Paul Baumbach (incumbent) | 5,786 | 100% |
| Total votes | | 5,786 | 100% |
| Democratic hold | | | |

=== District 24 ===
Incumbent Democrat Edward Osienski had represented the 24th district since 2010.

Delaware House of Representatives 24th district general election, 2018
| Party | Candidate | Votes | % |
|---|---|---|---|
| Democratic | Edward Osienski (incumbent) | 4,989 | 69.34% |
| Republican | William Dilks Sr. | 2,205 | 30.66% |
| Total votes | | 7,194 | 100% |
| Democratic hold | | | |

=== District 25 ===
Incumbent Democrat John Kowalko Jr. had represented the 25th district since 2006.

Delaware House of Representatives 25th district general election, 2018
| Party | Candidate | Votes | % |
|---|---|---|---|
| Democratic | John Kowalko Jr. (incumbent) | 4,027 | 64.78% |
| Republican | Bryan Rash | 2,189 | 35.22% |
| Total votes | | 6,216 | 100% |
| Democratic hold | | | |

=== District 26 ===
Incumbent Democrat John Viola had represented the 26th district since 1998.

Delaware House of Representatives 26th district general election, 2018
| Party | Candidate | Votes | % |
|---|---|---|---|
| Democratic | John Viola (incumbent) | 5,417 | 73.89% |
| Republican | Justin Cruice | 1,914 | 26.11% |
| Total votes | | 7,331 | 100% |
| Democratic hold | | | |

=== District 27 ===
Incumbent Democrat Earl Jaques Jr. had represented the 27th district since 2008.

Delaware House of Representatives 27th district general election, 2018
| Party | Candidate | Votes | % |
|---|---|---|---|
| Democratic | Earl Jaques Jr. (incumbent) | 7,123 | 85.33% |
| Libertarian | William Hinds | 1,224 | 14.67% |
| Total votes | | 8,347 | 100% |
| Democratic hold | | | |

=== District 28 ===
Incumbent Democrat William Carson Jr. had represented the 28th district since 2008.

Delaware House of Representatives 28th district general election, 2018
| Party | Candidate | Votes | % |
|---|---|---|---|
| Democratic | William Carson Jr. (incumbent) | 5,176 | 67.98% |
| Republican | Charlotte Middleton | 2,438 | 32.02% |
| Total votes | | 7,614 | 100% |
| Democratic hold | | | |

=== District 29 ===
Incumbent Democrat Charles Paradee had represented the 29th district since 2012. Paradee retired to run for the state senate, and fellow Democrat William Bush IV won the open seat.

Delaware House of Representatives 29th district general election, 2018
| Party | Candidate | Votes | % |
|---|---|---|---|
| Democratic | William Bush IV | 5,585 | 57.72% |
| Republican | Robin R. Hayes | 4,090 | 42.28% |
| Total votes | | 9,675 | 100% |
| Democratic hold | | | |

=== District 30 ===
Incumbent Republican William Outten had represented the 30th district since 2004. Outten did not seek re-election, and fellow Republican Shannon Morris won the open seat.

Delaware House of Representatives 30th district general election, 2018
| Party | Candidate | Votes | % |
|---|---|---|---|
| Republican | Shannon Morris | 4,615 | 64.75% |
| Democratic | Charles Groce | 2,513 | 35.25% |
| Total votes | | 7,128 | 100% |
| Republican hold | | | |

=== District 31 ===
Incumbent Democrat Sean Lynn had represented the 31st district since 2014.

Democratic primary

Delaware House of Representatives 31st district Democratic primary election, 2018
| Party | Candidate | Votes | % |
|---|---|---|---|
| Democratic | Sean Lynn (incumbent) | 1,225 | 62.34% |
| Democratic | Ralph Taylor | 740 | 37.66% |
| Total votes | | 1,965 | 100% |

Republican primary

Delaware House of Representatives 31st district Republican primary election, 2018
| Party | Candidate | Votes | % |
|---|---|---|---|
| Republican | David Levi Anderson | 611 | 72.22% |
| Republican | M. Jean Dowding | 235 | 27.78% |
| Total votes | | 846 | 100% |

General election

Delaware House of Representatives 31st district general election, 2018
| Party | Candidate | Votes | % |
|---|---|---|---|
| Democratic | Sean Lynn (incumbent) | 4,675 | 65.48% |
| Republican | David Levi Anderson | 2,464 | 34.52% |
| Total votes | | 7,139 | 100% |
| Democratic hold | | | |

=== District 32 ===
Incumbent Democrat Andria Bennett had represented the 32nd district since 2012.

Delaware House of Representatives 32nd district general election, 2018
| Party | Candidate | Votes | % |
|---|---|---|---|
| Democratic | Andria Bennett (incumbent) | 3,510 | 62.34% |
| Republican | Cheryl Precourt | 2,120 | 37.66% |
| Total votes | | 5,630 | 100% |
| Democratic hold | | | |

=== District 33 ===
Incumbent Republican Charles Postles Jr. had represented the 33rd district since 2016.

Delaware House of Representatives 33rd district general election, 2018
| Party | Candidate | Votes | % |
|---|---|---|---|
| Republican | Charles Postles Jr. (incumbent) | 5,001 | 60.51% |
| Democratic | James Todd Webb | 3,264 | 39.49% |
| Total votes | | 8,265 | 100% |
| Republican hold | | | |

=== District 34 ===
Incumbent Republican Lyndon Yearick had represented the 34th district since 2014.

Delaware House of Representatives 34th district general election, 2018
| Party | Candidate | Votes | % |
|---|---|---|---|
| Republican | Lyndon Yearick (incumbent) | 5,476 | 58.13% |
| Democratic | Adewunmi Kuforiji | 3,825 | 40.60% |
| Libertarian | William McVay | 118 | 1.27% |
| Total votes | | 9,419 | 100% |
| Republican hold | | | |

=== District 35 ===
Incumbent Republican David Wilson had represented the 35th district since 2008. Wilson retired to run for the state senate. Republican Jesse Vanderwende won the open seat.

Republican primary

Delaware House of Representatives 35th district Republican primary election, 2018
| Party | Candidate | Votes | % |
|---|---|---|---|
| Republican | Jesse Vanderwende | 1,323 | 58.01% |
| Republican | Robert D. Mitchell | 958 | 41.99% |
| Total votes | | 2,281 | 100% |

General election

Delaware House of Representatives 35th district general election, 2018
| Party | Candidate | Votes | % |
|---|---|---|---|
| Republican | Jesse Vanderwende | 5,648 | 100% |
| Total votes | | 5,648 | 100% |
| Republican hold | | | |

=== District 36 ===
Incumbent Republican Harvey Kenton had represented the 36th district since 2010. Kenton did not seek re-election, and fellow Republican Bryan Shupe won the open seat.

Delaware House of Representatives 36th district general election, 2018
| Party | Candidate | Votes | % |
|---|---|---|---|
| Republican | Bryan Shupe | 5,244 | 64.81% |
| Democratic | Donald M. Allan Jr. | 2,848 | 35.19% |
| Total votes | | 8,092 | 100% |
| Republican hold | | | |

=== District 37 ===
Incumbent Republican Ruth Briggs King had represented the th district since 2009.

Delaware House of Representatives 37th district general election, 2018
| Party | Candidate | Votes | % |
|---|---|---|---|
| Republican | Ruth Briggs King (incumbent) | 6,853 | 100% |
| Total votes | | 6,853 | 100% |
| Republican hold | | | |

=== District 38 ===
Incumbent Republican Ronald Gray had represented the 38th district since 2012.

Delaware House of Representatives 38th district general election, 2018
| Party | Candidate | Votes | % |
|---|---|---|---|
| Republican | Ronald Gray (incumbent) | 9,635 | 65.75% |
| Democratic | Meghan Kelly | 5,019 | 34.25% |
| Total votes | | 14,654 | 100% |
| Republican hold | | | |

=== District 39 ===
Incumbent Republican Daniel Short had represented the 39th district since 2006.

Delaware House of Representatives 39th district general election, 2018
| Party | Candidate | Votes | % |
|---|---|---|---|
| Republican | Daniel Short (incumbent) | 5,452 | 100% |
| Total votes | | 5,452 | 100% |
| Republican hold | | | |

=== District 40 ===
Incumbent Republican Timothy Dukes had represented the 40th district since 2012.

Delaware House of Representatives 40th district general election, 2018
| Party | Candidate | Votes | % |
|---|---|---|---|
| Republican | Timothy Dukes (incumbent) | 5,848 | 100% |
| Total votes | | 5,848 | 100% |
| Republican hold | | | |

=== District 41 ===
Incumbent Republican Richard Collins had represented the 41st district since 2014.

Delaware House of Representatives 41st district general election, 2018
| Party | Candidate | Votes | % |
|---|---|---|---|
| Republican | Richard Collins (incumbent) | 5,262 | 60.84% |
| Democratic | S. Bradley Connor | 3,388 | 39.16% |
| Total votes | | 8,650 | 100% |
| Republican hold | | | |
