= 2028 United States lieutenant gubernatorial elections =

- November 7, 2028

5 lieutenant governorships (Note: Seat tallies and popular vote do not include states that do not elect lieutenant governors separately from governors.)
	Majority party	Minority party
Party	Republican	Democratic
- Democratic incumbent Republican incumbent No election

The 2028 United States lieutenant gubernatorial elections are scheduled to be held on November 7, 2028, in 5 states. The previous lieutenant gubernatorial elections for this group of states took place in 2024, except in Vermont, where lieutenant governors serve two-year terms and will elect their lieutenant governor in 2026.

== Race summary ==
State	Lieutenant Governor	Party	First elected	Last race	Status	Candidates
Delaware	Kyle Evans Gay	Democratic	2024	55.2% D	Incumbent's intent unknown	TBD
Missouri	David Wasinger	Republican	2024	57.4% R	Incumbent's intent unknown	TBD
North Carolina	Rachel Hunt	Democratic	2024	49.5% D	Incumbent's intent unknown	▌Josh McConkey (Republican)
Vermont	Molly Gray	Democratic	2026	62.8% D	Incumbent's intent unknown	TBD
Washington	Denny Heck	Democratic	2020	55.7% D	Incumbent's intent unknown	TBD

== Delaware ==
Lieutenant Governor Kyle Evans Gay was elected in 2024 with 55.22% of the vote. She is eligible to run for re-election but has not yet stated if she will do so.

== Missouri ==
Lieutenant Governor David Wasinger was elected in 2024 with 57.38% of the vote. He is eligible to run for re-election but has not yet stated if he will do so.

== North Carolina ==
Lieutenant Governor Rachel Hunt was elected in 2024 with 49.53% of the vote. She is eligible to run for re-election but has not yet stated if she will do so. Republican Josh McConkey announced his candidacy.

== Vermont ==
Lieutenant Governor Molly Gray was elected in 2026 with 62.8% of the vote. She is eligible to run for re-election but has not yet stated if she will do so.

== Washington ==
Lieutenant Governor Denny Heck was re-elected in 2024 with 55.72% of the vote. He is eligible to run for re-election but has not yet stated if he will do so.
