= 2024 United States lieutenant gubernatorial elections =

- November 5, 2024

5 lieutenant governorships (Note: Seat tallies and popular vote do not include states that do not elect lieutenant governors separately from governors.)
	Majority party	Minority party
Party	Republican	Democratic
Seats before	12	4
Seats after	12	5
Seat change	Steady	▲1
Popular vote	6,402,089	6,275,107
Percentage	48.72%	47.75%
Seats up	2	2
Seats won	2	3
	Third party
Party	Progressive
Seats before	1
Seats after	0
Seat change	▼1
Popular vote	165,876
Percentage	1.26%
Seats up	1
Seats won	0
- Democratic hold Democratic gain Republican hold Republican gain No election

The 2024 United States lieutenant gubernatorial elections were held on November 5, 2024, to elect lieutenant governors in 5 states. The previous lieutenant gubernatorial elections for this group of states took place in 2020, except in Vermont, where lieutenant governors serve two-year terms and elected their lieutenant governor in 2022.

== Partisan composition ==
Going into these elections, this class of lieutenant governors is made up of 2 Democrats, 2 Republicans, and 1 Vermont Progressive. Vermont Progressives were defending one state won by Joe Biden in 2020 (Vermont), while Republicans and Democrats did not hold any states won by Joe Biden and Donald Trump respectively.

== Race summary ==
State	Lieutenant governor	Party	First elected	Last race	Status	Candidates
Delaware	Bethany Hall-Long	Democratic	2016	59.4% D	Incumbent term-limited. Democratic hold.	▌ ✓ Kyle Evans Gay (Democratic) 55.2%; ▌Ruth Briggs King (Republican) 44.8%
Missouri	Mike Kehoe	Republican	2018 (Note: Kehoe took office after his predecessor (Mike Parson) resigned to become governor.)	58.4% R	Incumbent retired to run for governor. Republican hold.	▌ ✓ David Wasinger (Republican) 57.4%; ▌Richard Brown (Democratic) 38.5%; ▌Ken Iverson (Libertarian) 2.1%; ▌Dani Elliott (Green) 2.0%
North Carolina	Mark Robinson	Republican	2020	51.6% R	Incumbent retired to run for governor. Democratic gain.	▌ ✓ Rachel Hunt (Democratic) 49.5%; ▌Hal Weatherman (Republican) 47.6%; ▌Shannon Bray (Libertarian) 1.9%; ▌Wayne Jones (Constitution) 1.0%
Vermont	David Zuckerman	Vermont Progressive	2016; 2020 (retired); 2022	53.9% VP	Incumbent lost re-election. Republican gain.	▌ ✓ John Rodgers (Republican) 48.8%; ▌David Zuckerman (Progressive/Democratic) 47.1%; ▌Ian Diamondstone (Green Mountain Peace and Justice) 3.9%
Washington	Denny Heck	Democratic	2020	45.6% D	Incumbent re-elected.	▌ ✓ Denny Heck (Democratic) 55.7%; ▌Dan Matthews (Republican) 44.2%

== Closest races ==
States where the margin of victory was between 1% and 5%:

1. Vermont, 1.69%
2. North Carolina, 1.89%

Blue denotes races won by Democrats. Red denotes races won by Republicans.

== Election predictions ==
Several sites and individuals published predictions of competitive seats. These predictions looked at factors such as the strength of the incumbent (if the incumbent is running for re-election), the strength of the candidates, and the partisan leanings of the state (reflected in part by the state's Cook Partisan Voting Index rating). The predictions assigned ratings to each seat, with the rating indicating the predicted advantage that a party has in winning that seat.

Most election predictors use:

- "tossup": no advantage
- "tilt" (used by some predictors): advantage that is not quite as strong as "lean"
- "lean": slight advantage
- "likely": significant, but surmountable, advantage
- "safe": near-certain chance of victory

State	PVI	Incumbent	Last race	Sabato July 25, 2024	Result
Delaware	D+7	Bethany Hall-Long (term-limited)	58.3% R	Safe D	Gay; 55.2% D
Missouri	R+10	Mike Kehoe (retiring)	58.4% R	Safe R	Wasinger; 57.4% R
North Carolina	R+3	Mark Robinson (retiring)	51.6% R	Tossup	Hunt; 49.5% D (flip)
Vermont	D+16	David Zuckerman	53.9% VP	Safe D (Note: Rated as "Safe D" as Zuckerman won the Democratic primary despite his Vermont Progressive Party affiliation.)	Rodgers; 48.8% R (flip)
Washington	D+8	Denny Heck	45.6% D (Note: Democrat Denny Heck won with 45.6% of the vote in 2020, against a fellow Democrat.)	Safe D	Heck; 55.7% D

== Delaware ==
Delaware lieutenant gubernatorial election
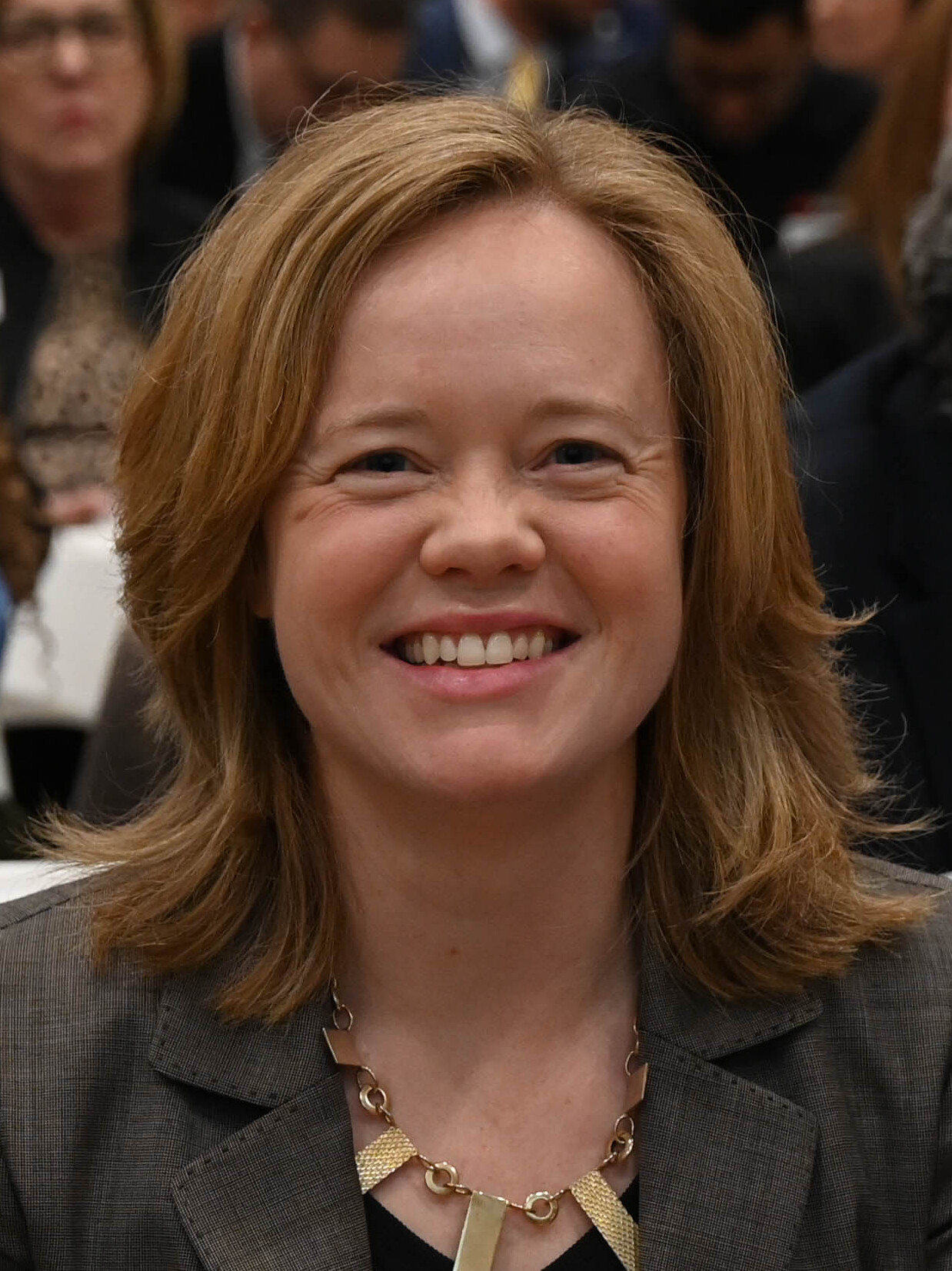

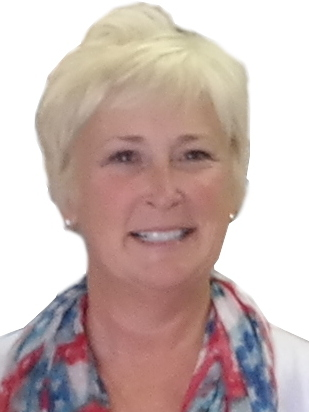
Nominee	Kyle Evans Gay	Ruth Briggs King
Party	Democratic	Republican
Popular vote	272,828	221,256
Percentage	55.22%	44.78%
- County results Gay: 60–70% King: 50–60%
Lieutenant Governor before election
Bethany Hall-Long
Democratic
Elected Lieutenant Governor
Kyle Evans Gay
Democratic

Two-term incumbent Republican Bethany Hall-Long was elected in 2020 and was term-limited and ineligible to run for re-election. Democratic state senator Kyle Evans Gay defeated Republican state representative Ruth Briggs King in the general election.

Democratic primary results
Party	Candidate	Votes	%
Democratic	Kyle Evans Gay	40,638	48.2%
Democratic	Sherry Dorsey Walker	31,035	36.8%
Democratic	Debbie Harrington	12,640	15.0%
Total votes		84,313	100%

Delaware lieutenant gubernatorial election, 2024
Party	Candidate	Votes	%	±%
Democratic	Kyle Evans Gay	272,828	55.22%	−3.92%
Republican	Ruth Briggs King	221,256	44.78%	+3.92%
Total votes		494,084	100.0%	N/A
Democratic hold				

== Missouri ==
Missouri lieutenant gubernatorial election
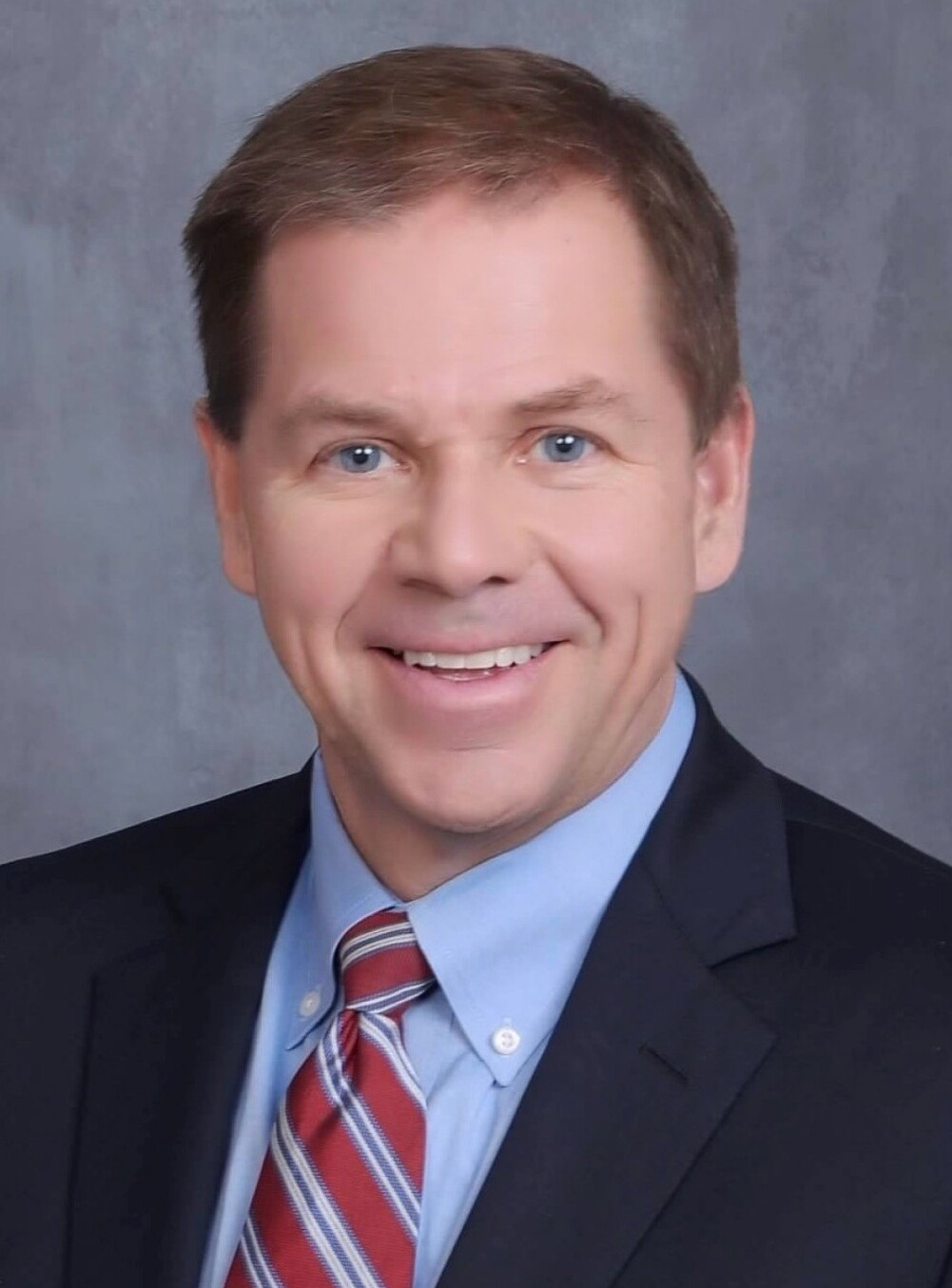

Nominee	David Wasinger	Richard Brown
Party	Republican	Democratic
Popular vote	1,671,771	1,121,608
Percentage	57.4%	38.5%
- County results Wasinger: 50–60% 60–70% 70–80% 80–90% Brown: 50–60% 70–80%
Lieutenant Governor before election
Mike Kehoe
Republican
Elected Lieutenant Governor
David Wasinger
Republican

Lieutenant Governor Mike Kehoe was elected in 2020 with 51.6% of the vote. He retired to run for governor. Republican attorney David Wasinger defeated Democratic state representative Richard Brown in the general election.

Republican primary results
Party	Candidate	Votes	%
Republican	David Wasinger	206,875	31.39
Republican	Lincoln Hough	199,423	30.26
Republican	Holly Thompson Rehder	142,801	21.67
Republican	Tim Baker	64,198	9.74
Republican	Matthew Porter	28,263	4.28
Republican	Paul Berry III	17,540	2.66
Total votes		659,100	100

Democratic primary results
Party	Candidate	Votes	%
Democratic	Richard Brown	231,970	64.93
Democratic	Anastasia Syes	125,283	35.07
Total votes		357,253	100.00

2024 Missouri lieutenant gubernatorial election
Party	Candidate	Votes	%
Republican	David Wasinger	1,671,771	57.38
Democratic	Richard Brown	1,121,608	38.50
Libertarian	Ken Iverson	61,731	2.12
Green	Dani Elliott	58,260	2.00
Total votes		2,913,370	100.00
Republican hold			

== North Carolina ==
Lieutenant Governor Mark Robinson was elected in 2020 with 51.6% of the vote. He retired to run for governor. Democratic state senator Rachel Hunt defeated Republican businessman Hal Weatherman in the general election.

North Carolina lieutenant gubernatorial election
- Turnout: 73.73% ▼1.62pp
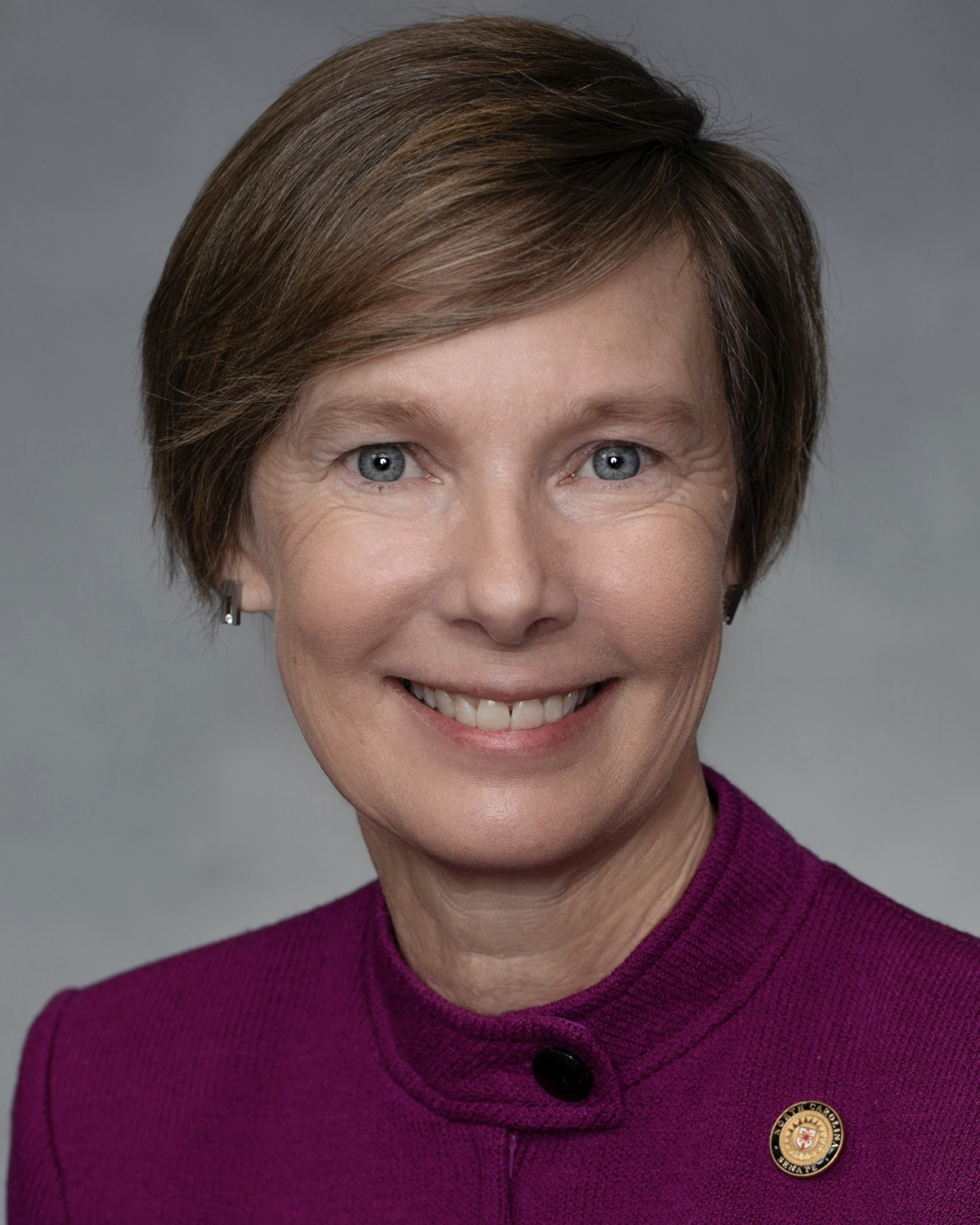

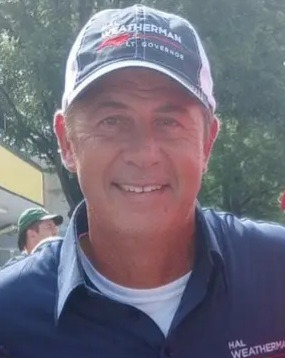
Nominee	Rachel Hunt	Hal Weatherman
Party	Democratic	Republican
Popular vote	2,768,539	2,663,183
Percentage	49.53%	47.64%
- County results Hunt: 50–60% 60–70% 70–80% 80–90% Weatherman: 40–50% 50–60% 60–70% 70–80% 80–90%
Lieutenant Governor before election
Mark Robinson
Republican
Elected Lieutenant Governor
Rachel Hunt
Democratic

Republican primary results
Party	Candidate	Votes	%
Republican	Hal Weatherman	181,818	19.59%
Republican	Jim O'Neill	147,042	15.84%
Republican	Deanna Ballard	138,822	14.96%
Republican	Seth Woodall	102,492	11.04%
Republican	Sam Page	94,810	10.22%
Republican	Allen Mashburn	83,550	9.00%
Republican	Jeffrey Elmore	79,883	8.61%
Republican	Peter Boykin	32,126	3.46%
Republican	Rivera Douthit	23,398	2.52%
Republican	Ernest T. Reeves	22,760	2.45%
Republican	Marlenis Hernandez Novoa	21,404	2.31%
Total votes		928,105	100.00%

Republican primary runoff results
Party	Candidate	Votes	%
Republican	Hal Weatherman	96,600	74.44%
Republican	Jim O'Neill	33,448	25.72%
Total votes		130,048	100.00%

Democratic primary results
Party	Candidate	Votes	%
Democratic	Rachel Hunt	477,196	70.35%
Democratic	Ben Clark	111,836	16.49%
Democratic	Mark H. Robinson	89,247	13.16%
Total votes		678,279	100.00%

2024 North Carolina lieutenant gubernatorial election
Party	Candidate	Votes	%	±%
Democratic	Rachel Hunt	2,768,539	49.53%	+1.16%
Republican	Hal Weatherman	2,663,183	47.64%	–3.99%
Libertarian	Shannon Bray	104,192	1.86%	N/A
Constitution	Wayne Jones	53,938	0.96%	N/A
Total votes		5,589,852	100.00%	N/A
Democratic gain from Republican				

== Vermont ==
Lieutenant Governor David Zuckerman was elected in 2022 with 53.9% of the vote. He lost re-election to former state senator John Rodgers.

Vermont lieutenant gubernatorial election
- November 5, 2024 (general election); January 9, 2025 (contingent election)
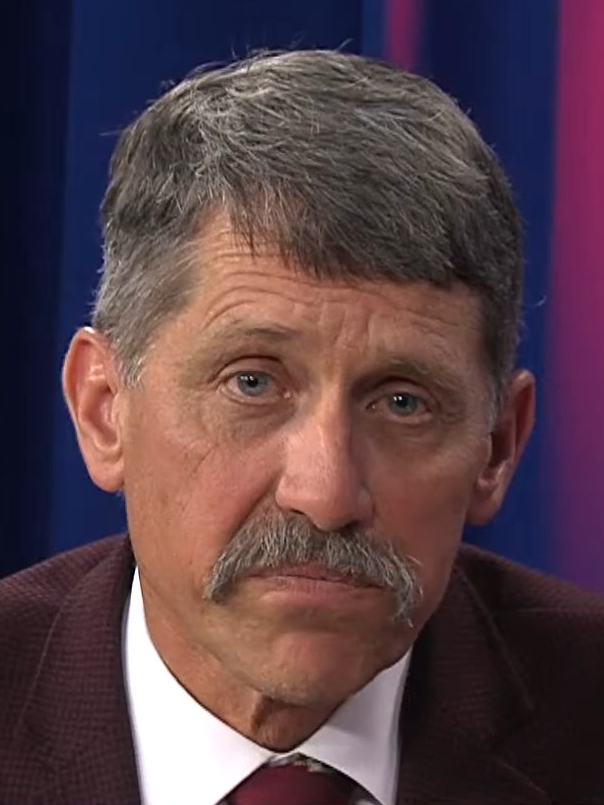

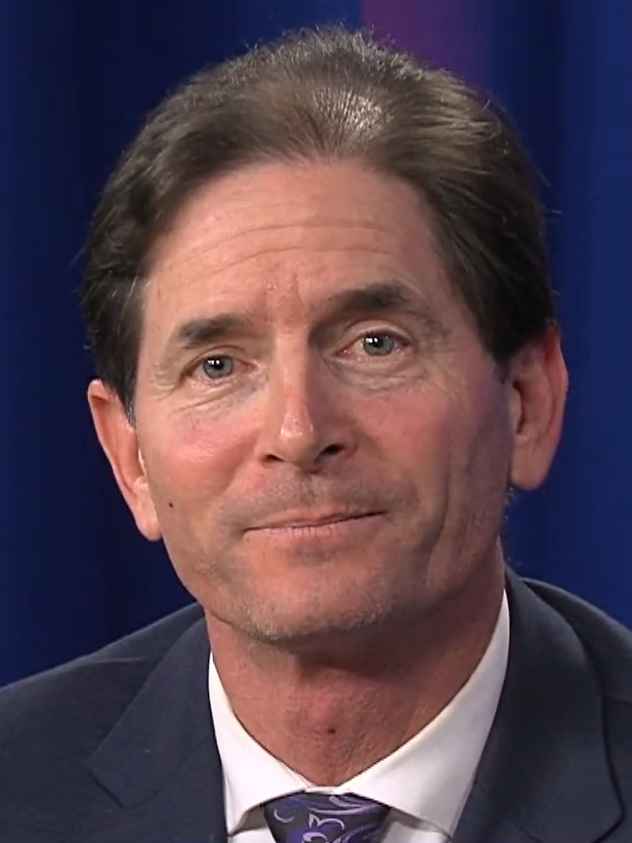
Nominee	John Rodgers	David Zuckerman
Party	Republican	Progressive
Alliance		Democratic
Electoral vote	158	18
Popular vote	171,854	165,876
Percentage	48.76%	47.07%
- Rodgers: 40–50% 50–60% 60–70% 70–80% 80–90% Zuckerman: 40–50% 50–60% 60–70% 70–80% Tie: 40–50% No votes
Lieutenant Governor before election
David Zuckerman
Progressive
Elected Lieutenant Governor
John Rodgers
Republican

Progressive primary
Party	Candidate	Votes	%
Progressive	Zoraya Hightower	257	62.08%
Progressive	Undervotes (Note: Blank ballots)	72	17.39%
Democratic	David Zuckerman (write-in)	55	13.29%
Write-in		29	7.01%
Progressive	Overvotes	1	0.24%
Total votes		414	100.00%

Democratic primary
Party	Candidate	Votes	%
Democratic	David Zuckerman (incumbent)	28,729	55.28%
Democratic	Thomas Renner	18,838	36.25%
Democratic	Undervotes	3,760	7.24%
Write-in		603	1.16%
Democratic	Overvotes	39	0.08%
Total votes		51,969	100.00%

Republican primary
Party	Candidate	Votes	%
Republican	John Rodgers	13,840	55.39%
Republican	Gregory Thayer	8,619	34.50%
Republican	Undervotes	2,257	9.03%
Write-in		234	0.94%
Republican	Overvotes	35	0.14%
Total votes		24,985	100.00%

2024 Vermont lieutenant gubernatorial election
Party	Candidate	Votes	%	±%
Republican	John Rodgers	171,854	48.76%	+6.16%
Progressive/Democratic	David Zuckerman (incumbent)	165,876	47.07%	−6.78%
Green Mountain Peace and Justice Party	Ian Diamondstone	13,671	3.88%	+0.95%
Write-in		1,013	0.29%	-0.33%
Total votes		352,414	100.00%	N/A
Republican gain from Progressive				

2024 Vermont lieutenant gubernatorial contingent election
Party	Candidate	Votes	%
Republican	John Rodgers	158	87.77%
Progressive/Democratic	David Zuckerman (incumbent)	18	10.23%
Green Mountain Peace and Justice Party	Ian Diamondstone	0	0%
Total votes		176	100.0%
Republican gain from Progressive			

== Washington ==
Lieutenant Governor Denny Heck was elected in 2020 with 45.6% of the vote against a fellow Democrat. He successfully ran for re-election defeating Republican nominee Dan Matthews.

Washington lieutenant gubernatorial election
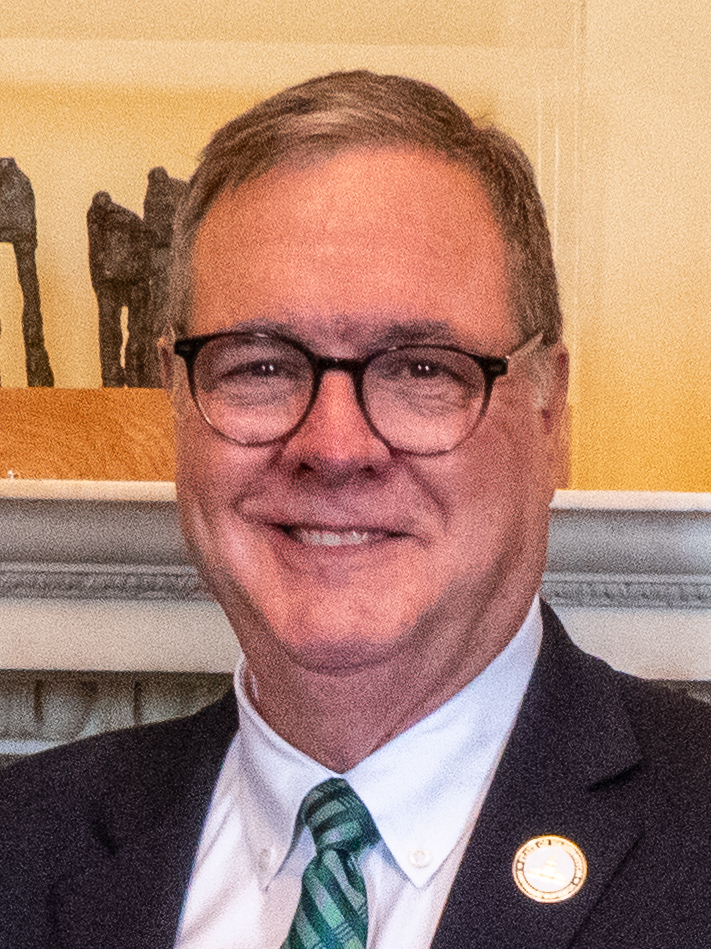

Nominee	Denny Heck	Dan Matthews
Party	Democratic	Republican
Popular vote	2,112,132	1,674,025
Percentage	55.72%	44.16%
- County results Heck: 50–60% 70–80% Matthews: 50–60% 60–70% 70–80%
Lieutenant Governor before election
Denny Heck
Democratic
Elected Lieutenant Governor
Denny Heck
Democratic

Blanket primary election results
Party	Candidate	Votes	%
Democratic	Denny Heck (incumbent)	927,395	48.62%
Republican	Dan Matthews	438,537	22.99%
Republican	Bob Hagglund	319,071	16.73%
Democratic	David Griffin	169,759	8.90%
Liberal Republican	Patrick Harman	50,330	2.64%
Write-in		2,538	0.13%
Total votes		1,907,630	100.00%

2024 Washington lieutenant gubernatorial election
Party	Candidate	Votes	%
Democratic	Denny Heck (incumbent)	2,112,132	55.72%
Republican	Dan Matthews	1,674,025	44.16%
Write-in		4,376	0.12%
Total votes		3,790,533	100.00%
Democratic hold			
