= Michael Barbieri =

Michael Barbieri may refer to:

- Michael Barbieri (politician) (born 1949), American politician
- Michael Barbieri (actor) (born 2002), American actor
