= Josue Ortega (politician) =

American politician

Member of the Delaware House of Representatives from the 3rd district
- Incumbent
- Assumed office January 15, 2025
- Preceded by: Sherry Dorsey Walker

Personal details
- Born: Wilmington, Delaware, U.S.
- Party: Democratic

Josue O. Ortega is an American politician serving as a Democratic member of the Delaware House of Representatives for the 3rd district since 2025. The district includes part of Wilmington.

== Early life ==
Ortega was born and raised in Wilmington, Delaware, where his father, Demitrio, served on the city council. Prior to his election, he worked as a community liaison for the New Castle County government.

== Delaware House of Representatives ==
Following incumbent Democrat Sherry Dorsey Walker's announcement that she would run for lieutenant governor, Ortega launched his campaign for the Delaware House of Representatives in 2024. His sole opponent, Branden Fletcher-Dominguez, dropped out five days before the primary due to failure to establish a permanent residence, leaving Ortgega uncontested in both the primary and general elections. He stated that expanding multilingual constituent services would be his priority in the legislature.

=== Tenure ===
Ortega joined 4 other Democrats and all Republican representatives to vote against a bill allowing physician-assisted suicide. He sponsored a bill to protect undocumented students from civil immigration enforcement in schools.

In 2026, Ortega lost the Democratic primary, placing third to progressive challenger Branden Fletcher-Dominguez.
