= Josh McConkey =

American author (born 1977)

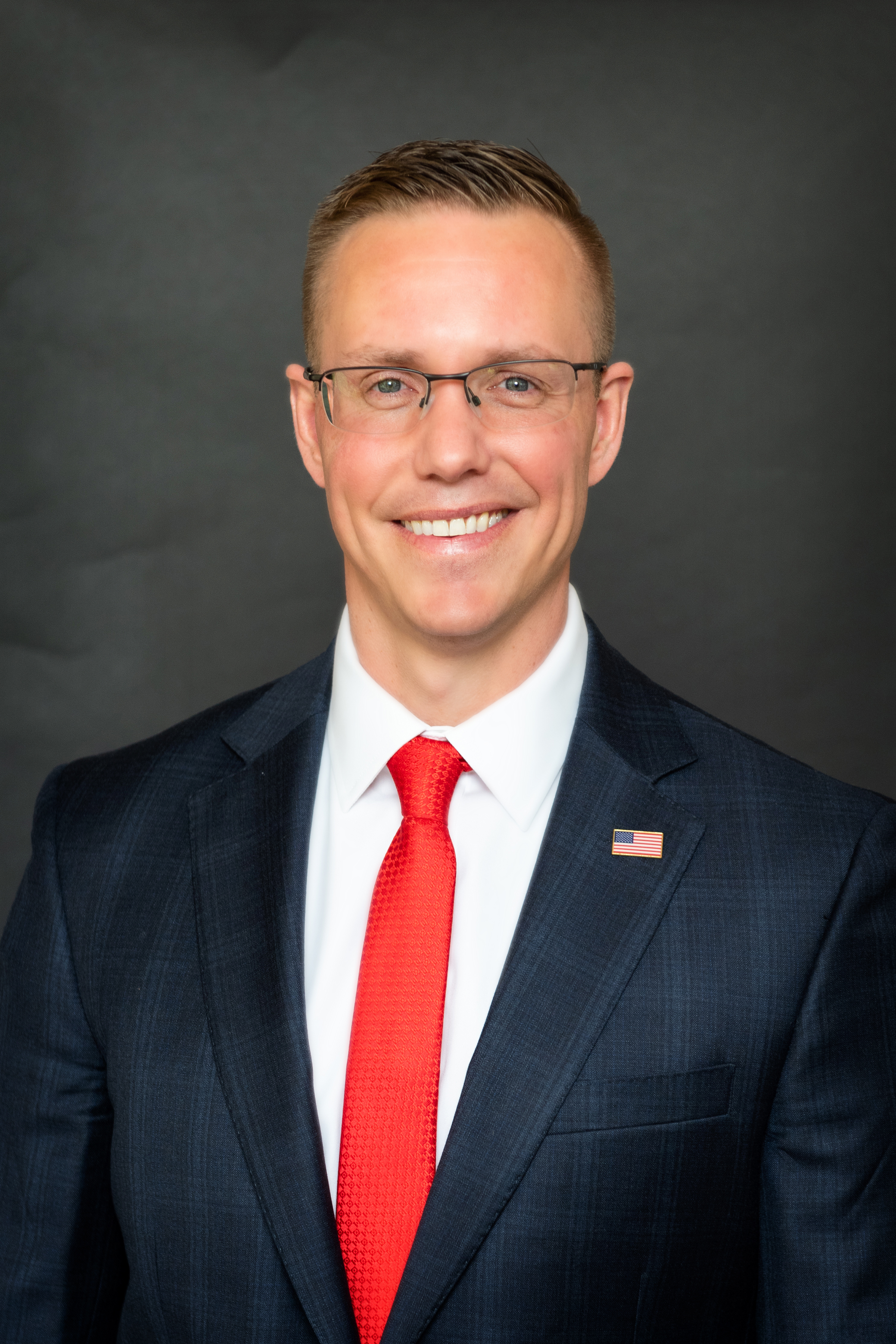
- McConkey in 2023
- Born: Joshua Michael McConkey; September 18, 1977 (age 49); Renton, Washington, U.S.
- Education: Chadron State College (B.S.); University of Nebraska Medical Center (M.D.)
- Occupations: Author; Emergency physician; Politician; U.S. Air Force colonel
- Known for: Be the Weight Behind the Spear
- Website: joshmcconkey.com

Joshua Michael McConkey (born 18 September 1977) is an American author, politician, emergency physician, and United States Air Force (USAF) colonel. He is the author of the leadership book Be the Weight Behind the Spear and previously served as Chief of Aviation Medicine for the Nebraska Army National Guard from 2007 to 2009. He ran for Congress from the 13th district seat of North Carolina in 2024.

== Early life and education ==
McConkey grew up in Alliance, Nebraska and attended Alliance High School. He participated in the Rural Health Opportunity Program (RHOP) at Chadron State. McConkey graduated summa cum laude with a Bachelor of Science in Biological Sciences from Chadron State College in 1999. He also received a Doctorate of Medicine from the University of Nebraska Omaha in 2003.

McConkey's military education includes being a graduate of Air Command & Staff College, Air War College, and National Security Course at National Defense University.

== Career ==
McConkey joined the Nebraska Army National Guard in 2000 as a Medical Service Corps officer and later served as the Nebraska Guard's Chief of Aviation Medicine, holding the role of flight surgeon from 2007 to 2009. His military medical background includes over 340 hours of flight surgeon experience in both fixed-wing and rotary-wing aircraft. In 2007, he was deployed to Iraq in support of Operation Iraqi Freedom.

In 2011, McConkey transferred to the U.S. Air Force Reserve, eventually earning the rank of Colonel in 2019. He served as a flight surgeon and Critical Care Air Transport physician, also serving for a time as Chief of Medical Staff at the 916th Aerospace Medicine Squadron. As of 2025, he is serving as Commander of the 459th Aeromedical Staging Squadron at Joint Base Andrews in Maryland.

Alliance Public School named him to their Wall of Fame in 2022.

In 2023, McConkey released the book Be the Weight Behind the Spear. which received a Distinguished Favorite award in the “Motivational” category at the 2024 Independent Press Awards. The book was also nominated for a Pulitzer Prize in 2025. He also received the Distinguished Alumni Award from Chadron State College. McConkey also discussed the book on media outlets such as Fox 24 News, Michigan's Big Show, and The Clay Travis and Buck Sexton Show.

In 2024, McConkey ran for Congress from the 13th district seat of North Carolina, but was not elected.

In 2025, he received a People's Telly Gold Award for his work on the program A True American Hero: Dr. Josh McConkey's Journey as a Doctor, Soldier, and Leader. In the same year, McConkey also released the screenplay One Week with Gerald, which won a New York Script Award for Best War Screenplay and was named an official selection at the Beverly Hills Film Festival in 2026.

McConkey also published the children's book The Heart of a Leader in 2025, which he discussed as a guest on Burke Allen’s Big Time Talker Podcast. He received a Gold Mom's Choice Award for the book in March 2025.

Since the mid-2000s, he has worked clinically as an emergency physician. Previously, he also was a professor at Duke University. McConkey has also served as a correspondent for news programs such as WRAL News.

== Personal life ==
McConkey is married and has three children. They reside in Apex, North Carolina. In February 2024, he won over $757,000 in the North Carolina Education Lottery and used the funds for his political campaigns. McConkey has been nicknamed “The MacGyver Doc.”

== Awards and accolades ==
=== Media and print awards ===
Work	Year and Award	Category	Result	Ref.
A True American Hero: Dr. Josh McConkey's Journey as a Doctor, Soldier, and Leader	2025 Telly Award	People's Telly Gold	Won	
Be the Weight Behind the Spear	2025 Pulitzer Prize	—	Nominated	
The Heart of a Leader	2025 Mom's Choice Award	Juvenile Books (Level 1 – Ages 5 to 8): Inspirational/ Motivational	Won	
One Week with Gerald	2025 New York Script Award	Best War Screenplay	Won	
One Week with Gerald	2026 Beverly Hills Film Festival	Official Selection (Screenplay)	Won	

=== Military honors ===
- Legion of Merit for Exceptional Service

== Bibliography ==
- McConkey, J. (2023). Be the Weight Behind the Spear. Wisdom House Books, ISBN 979-8988172208
- McConkey, J. (2025). The Heart of a Leader. Headline Books. ISBN 978-1958914892
