= David Bentz =

American politician (born 1986)

Member of the Delaware House of Representatives from the 18th district
- In office September 12, 2015 – November 9, 2022
- Preceded by: Michael Barbieri
- Succeeded by: Sophie Phillips

Personal details
- Born: February 28, 1986 (age 40) Lancaster, Pennsylvania, U.S.
- Party: Democratic
- Education: Penn State University (BA); University of Delaware (MPA)
- Occupation: Legislator
- Website: Official website

David Bentz (born February 28, 1986) is an American politician. He was a Democratic member of the Delaware House of Representatives, representing district 18. Bentz won a special election on September 12, 2015, to replace Democrat Michael Barbieri, who had resigned the month before to take a job with the state government. He did not file for re-election in 2022.
