= 2024 Delaware lieutenant gubernatorial election =

- November 5, 2024
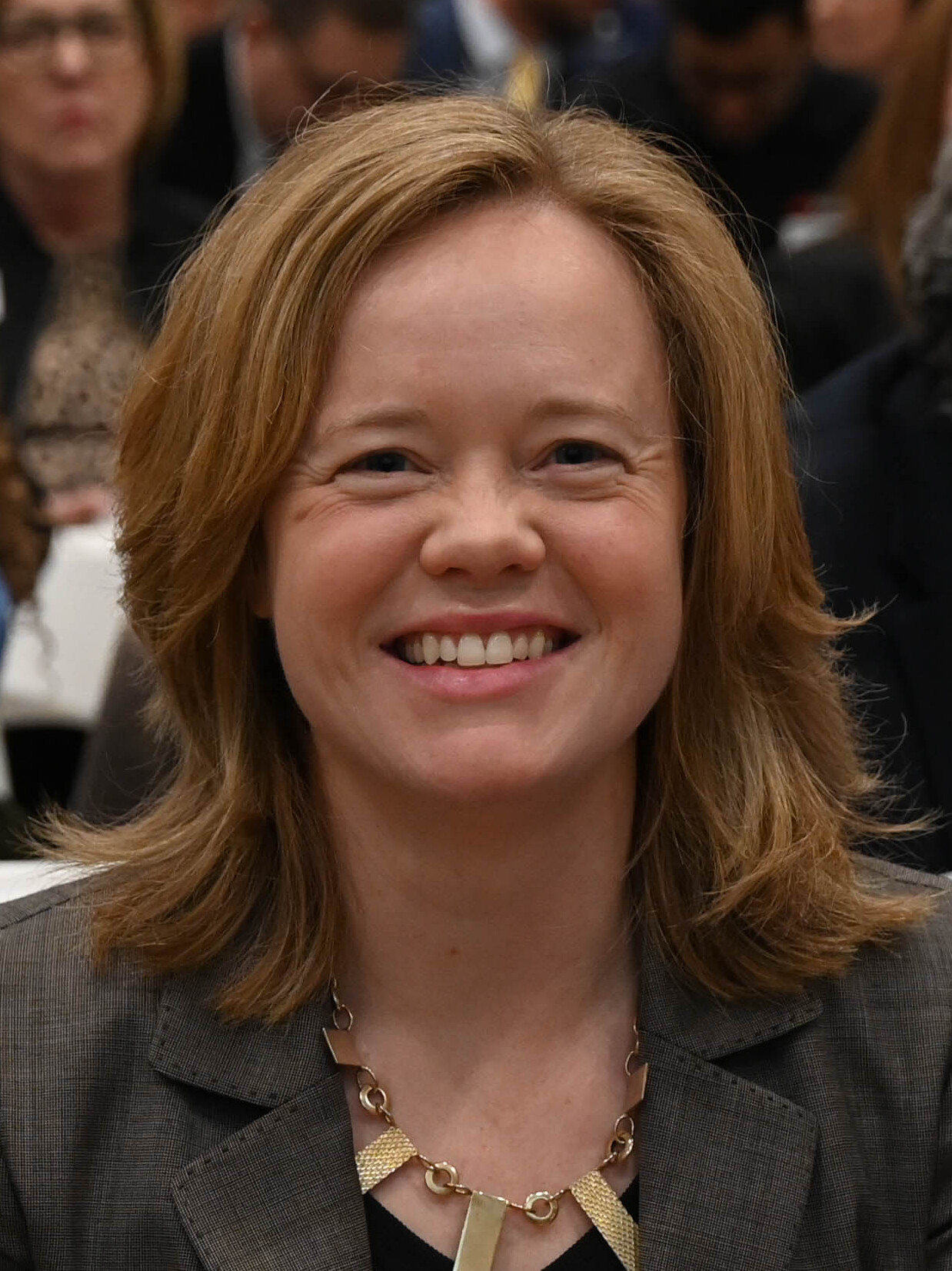

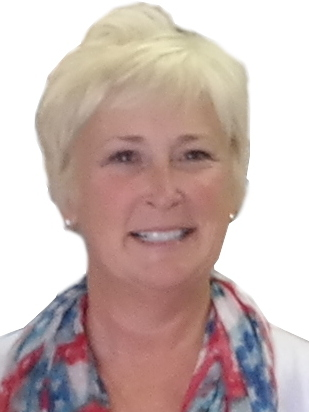
Nominee	Kyle Evans Gay	Ruth Briggs King
Party	Democratic	Republican
Popular vote	272,828	221,256
Percentage	55.22%	44.78%
- Gay: 50–60% 60–70% 70–80% 80–90% >90% King: 50–60% 60–70% 70–80% 80–90% No votes
Lieutenant Governor before election
Bethany Hall-Long
Democratic
Elected Lieutenant Governor
Kyle Evans Gay
Democratic

The 2024 Delaware lieutenant gubernatorial election was held on November 5, 2024, to elect the lieutenant governor of Delaware, concurrently with the 2024 U.S. presidential election, as well as elections to the United States Senate, elections to the United States House of Representatives, and various other state and local elections. Incumbent Democratic Lieutenant Governor Bethany Hall-Long is term-limited and cannot seek re-election to a third term in office; she instead unsuccessfully ran for governor. The Democratic primary was held on September 10, in which state senator Kyle Evans Gay won the nomination. As Ruth Briggs King was the only Republican candidate who qualified, the Republican primary was cancelled.

== Democratic primary ==
=== Candidates ===
==== Nominee ====
- Kyle Evans Gay, state senator from the 5th district

==== Eliminated in primary ====
- Debbie Harrington, 2nd vice chair of the Delaware Democratic Party
- Sherry Dorsey Walker, state representative from the 3rd district

==== Failed to file ====
- David Lamar Williams Jr., contract specialist and candidate for governor in 2020

=== Endorsements ===
Kyle Evans Gay

Political parties

- Delaware Democratic Party

=== Polling ===
Poll source	Date(s) administered	Sample size (Note: Key: A – all adults RV – registered voters LV – likely voters V – unclear)	Margin of error	Kyle Evans Gay	Debbie Harrington	Sherry Dorsey Walker	David Lamar Williams Jr.	Other	Undecided
Slingshot Strategies (Note: Poll sponsored by Citizens for a New Delaware Way PAC)	August 8–13, 2024	500 (RV)	± 4.4%	10%	12%	14%	6%	6% (Note: "Someone else" with 6%)	52%
Slingshot Strategies	July 5–9, 2024	446 (RV)	± 4.6%	9%	8%	16%	9%	5% (Note: "Someone else" with 5%)	53%

=== Forums ===
The League of Women Voters of Delaware and the Alpha Kappa Alpha Sorority hosted a candidate forum on August 22. All three candidates were in attendance.

2024 Delaware lieutenant gubernatorial election Democratic primary candidate forum
No.	Date	Host	Moderator	Link	Democratic	Democratic	Democratic
Key: P Participant A Absent N Not invited I Invited W Withdrawn							
Key: P Participant A Absent N Not invited I Invited W Withdrawn					Kyle Evans Gay	Debbie Harrington	Sherry Dorsey Walker
1	Jul. 15, 2024	A. Philip Randolph Institute Delaware chapter Canaan Baptist Church; Metropolitan Wilmington Urban League		YouTube	P	P	P

=== Results ===
Democratic primary results
Party	Candidate	Votes	%
Democratic	Kyle Evans Gay	40,638	48.2%
Democratic	Sherry Dorsey Walker	31,035	36.8%
Democratic	Debbie Harrington	12,640	15.0%
Total votes		84,313	100%

== Republican primary ==
=== Candidates ===
==== Nominee ====
- Ruth Briggs King, former state representative from the 37th district (2009–2023)

=== Endorsements ===
Ruth Briggs King

Political parties

- Delaware Republican Party

== General election ==
=== Predictions ===
Source	Ranking	As of
Sabato's Crystal Ball	Safe D	July 25, 2024

=== Polling ===
Poll source	Date(s) administered	Sample size	Margin of error	Kyle Evans Gay (D)	Ruth Briggs King (R)	Other	Undecided
Slingshot Strategies (Note: Poll sponsored by Citizens for Judicial Fairness)	September 19–21, 2024	500 (RV)	—	37%	29%	4%	30%

=== Results ===
Delaware lieutenant gubernatorial election, 2024
Party	Candidate	Votes	%	±%
Democratic	Kyle Evans Gay	272,828	55.22%	−3.92%
Republican	Ruth Briggs King	221,256	44.78%	+3.92%
Total votes		494,084	100.0%	N/A
Democratic hold				

==== By county ====
By county

County	Kyle Evans Gay Democratic		Ruth Briggs King Republican		Margin		Total votes
County	#	%	#	%	#	%	Total votes
Kent	41,800	48.96	43,580	51.04	-1,780	-2.08	85,380
New Castle	171,958	64.84	93,264	35.16	78,694	29.68	265,222
Sussex	59,070	41.17	84,412	58.83	-25,342	-16.66	143,482
Totals	272,828	55.22	221,256	44.78	51,572	10.44	494,084

Counties that flipped from Democratic to Republican

- Kent (largest city: Dover)

== Notes ==
Partisan clients
