= Mara Gorman =

American politician from Delaware

Member of the Delaware House of Representatives from the 23rd district
- Incumbent
- Assumed office November 6, 2024
- Preceded by: Paul Baumbach

Personal details
- Party: Democratic
- Website: Official website

Mara Gorman is an American politician. She is a Democratic member of the Delaware House of Representatives, representing district 23, which includes parts of Newark, Pike Creek, and North Star.

== Biography ==
Gorman was born in Maine and raised in Massachusetts, Connecticut, and Vermont. She moved to Delaware in 1997 with her husband Matt and worked as a freelance writer and travel blogger on her website "The Mother of All Trips" while raising her children. She became involved in local politics in 2015 as a result of the Sandy Hook Elementary School shooting and other mass shootings, spending several years as a leader of the Delaware chapter of Moms Demand Action for Gun Sense in America until leaving the role in 2023. She then worked as the public affairs manager for Planned Parenthood of Delaware.

In June 2024, she announced she was running to succeed retiring state representative Paul Baumbach. Her campaign issues included gun safety legislation and access to reproductive health care. She won the election unopposed.
