= Michael Barbieri (politician) =

American politician

Member of the Delaware House of Representatives from the 18th district
- In office November 5, 2008 – August 3, 2015
- Preceded by: Terry R. Spence
- Succeeded by: David Bentz

Personal details
- Born: July 28, 1949 (age 76) Philadelphia, Pennsylvania, U.S.
- Party: Democratic
- Education: University of Delaware (BA, PhD); Temple University (MSW)

Michael A. Barbieri (born July 28, 1949) is an American politician. He was a Democratic member of the Delaware House of Representatives from January 2009 until August 2015.

In 2015, Barbieri resigned from his office to take an appointed $144,213 position as director of the Division of Substance Abuse and Mental Health. The job position was not advertised, and Barbieri and the Democratic Party of Delaware were criticized for cronyism. A special election was held to fill Barbieri's seat, which was won by David Bentz. In July 2017, Barbieri resigned from his director position after a patient at one of the treatment centers he oversaw died of neglect. Barbieri was also under scrutiny due to child sexual abuse allegations against a worker at an outpatient treatment facility he owned at the time of the abuse.

Barbieri earned his BA in sociology from the University of Delaware, his MSW from Temple University, and his PhD from the University of Delaware.

== Electoral history ==
- In 2006, Barbieri lost the general election to incumbent Republican Terry R. Spence, who had held the seat since 1987 and was the current Speaker of the House.
- In 2008, Barbieri challenged Spence to a rematch and won the general election with 4,164 votes (52.0%) against Spence, who also qualified and received votes as the Working Families Party nominee.
- In 2010, Spence challenged Barbieri to regain his seat, setting up a third contest, which Barbieri won in the general election with 3,115 votes (53.0%) against Spence, who again qualified for the Working Families Party.
- In 2012, Barbieri was unopposed for the general election, winning 7,501 votes.
