= Valerie Jones Giltner =

American politician

Member of the Delaware House of Representatives from the 37th district
- Incumbent
- Assumed office December 22, 2023
- Preceded by: Ruth Briggs King

Personal details
- Party: Republican
- Education: Sussex Central High School
- Occupation: Nurse, healthcare consultant

Valerie Jones Giltner is an American politician who has served as a member of the Delaware House of Representatives from the 37th district since 2023. She is a Republican.

== Biography ==
Jones is from Georgetown, Delaware and graduated from Sussex Central High School. In her professional career, she became a nurse and healthcare consultant.

On December 21, 2023, Jones Giltner won the special election to fill Ruth Briggs King's vacated seat. She took office the following day.
