= Sophie Phillips =

American politician from Delaware

Member of the Delaware House of Representatives from the 18th district
- Incumbent
- Assumed office November 9, 2022
- Preceded by: David Bentz

Personal details
- Born: 1995 or 1996 (age 30–31)
- Party: Democratic
- Other political affiliations: Working Families Party
- Education: University of Delaware
- Profession: Researcher
- Website: Campaign website
- Beauty pageant titleholder
- Title: Miss Delaware 2021

Sophie Phillips (born 1995/1996) is an American politician. She is a Democratic member of the Delaware House of Representatives, representing District 18. First elected in 2022, she succeeded David Bentz after his retirement from office. She was winner of the 2021 Miss Delaware beauty pageant.

== Early life ==
Philips received a BS in environmental and marine science from the University of Delaware. While in college, she experienced sexual violence, which lead her to work as a student ambassador for Title IX and help create the "kNOw MORE" campaign to educate staff and students and advocate for survivors of sexual violence. Phillips credits these experiences as giving her confidence to use her voice for change. One of her friends at the time convinced her to try competing in beauty pageants, which she found to be a fun and supportive environment.

After graduating, she studied at the Joseph R. Biden, Jr. School of Public Policy & Administration, earning a master's degree in energy and environmental policy. Her thesis focused on environmental justice and how to increase the diversity of those visiting state and national parks. While in school, she aspired to be a National Park Service ranger and work toward ensuring equal access for people of color.

Phillip was named Miss Southern Delaware in 2018, allowing her to compete at the Miss Delaware pageant. In 2021, she was named Miss Milford and then Miss Delaware. She played a Jethro Tull song on piano for the talent portion. She used her title to advocate for environmental justice, including issues such as flooding and development in Sussex County, Delaware. She competed in the 100th anniversary Miss America pageant, being named a Top 5 finalist for the Justice and Equity Award.

== Political career ==
In 2022, Phillips was elected to represent the 18th district in the Delaware House of Representatives, defeating Republican Gloria Hope Payne in the November general election with over 70% of the vote. She ran as an environmental advocate and supported other progressive causes, such as recreational marijuana and climate change legislation.

== Personal life ==
Philips is of mixed African, Indian, Caribbean, and European descent. She chose become involved in environmental justice as a result of her multicultural heritage and recognizing the impacts of historical injustice. After she was elected to the Delaware General Assembly in 2022, she commented, "Every new person that comes in with a diverse background has a new perspective. And when you're writing policy, you need to make sure that you're taking in so many different perspectives so you’re not just writing policy for one population."

Phillips is an avid bicyclist and also plays the piano.

Awards and achievements
Preceded by Hillary May	Miss Delaware; 2021	Succeeded by Grace Otley
