= Claire Snyder-Hall =

American politician from Delaware

- Snyder-Hall in 2026

Member of the Delaware House of Representatives from the 14th district
- Incumbent
- Assumed office November 5, 2024
- Preceded by: Peter Schwartzkopf

Personal details
- Born: 1964 or 1965 (age 60–61)
- Party: Democratic
- Website: Official website

Claire Snyder-Hall (born 1964 or 1965) is an American politician. A Democrat, she has represented the 14th district in Delaware House of Representatives since 2024. The district includes Rehoboth Beach, Dewey Beach, and part of Lewes.

== Biography ==
Claire Snyder-Hall was born to Reverend Lee Snyder and Anne Snyder. She received a BA in psychology from Smith College and a PhD in political science from Rutgers University. She taught political science at several schools, including Rutgers, Princeton University, Hunter College, Illinois State University, and New College of Florida, before becoming a tenured faculty member at George Mason University. While briefly living in Florida, she was elected to the Sarasota County Democratic Committee and the state Democratic Progressive Caucus, and served as chair of the Sarasota-Charlotte Democratic Progressive Caucus.

Snyder-Hall moved to Rehoboth, Delaware full-time in 2011. She became chair of the 14th representative district's Democratic Committee and served on the Sussex County Democratic Executive Committee. She ran for the Delaware Senate in 2014 to represent the 6th district but lost in the general election to Republican Ernesto Lopez. She served as the executive director of Common Cause Delaware between 2015–2016 and 2020–2021 before being chosen to fill the position permanently in November 2021.

In January 2024, Snyder-Hall announced she was running to replace retiring state representative Peter Schwartzkopf to represent the 14th district in the Delaware House of Representatives. She faced two Democrats in the primary election, Marty Rendon and Kathy McGuiness, the former state auditor who resigned in 2022 after being convicted for conflict of interest and was endorsed by Schwartzkopf. She won the primary election with 41% of the votes, becoming the first woman to nominated to represent the 14th district. She went on to win the general election against Republican Mike Simpler with over 55% of the vote.

== Personal life ==
Snyder-Hall married her wife, Mikki, in California in 2008.
