= Kyle Evans Gay =

American politician and attorney (born 1986)

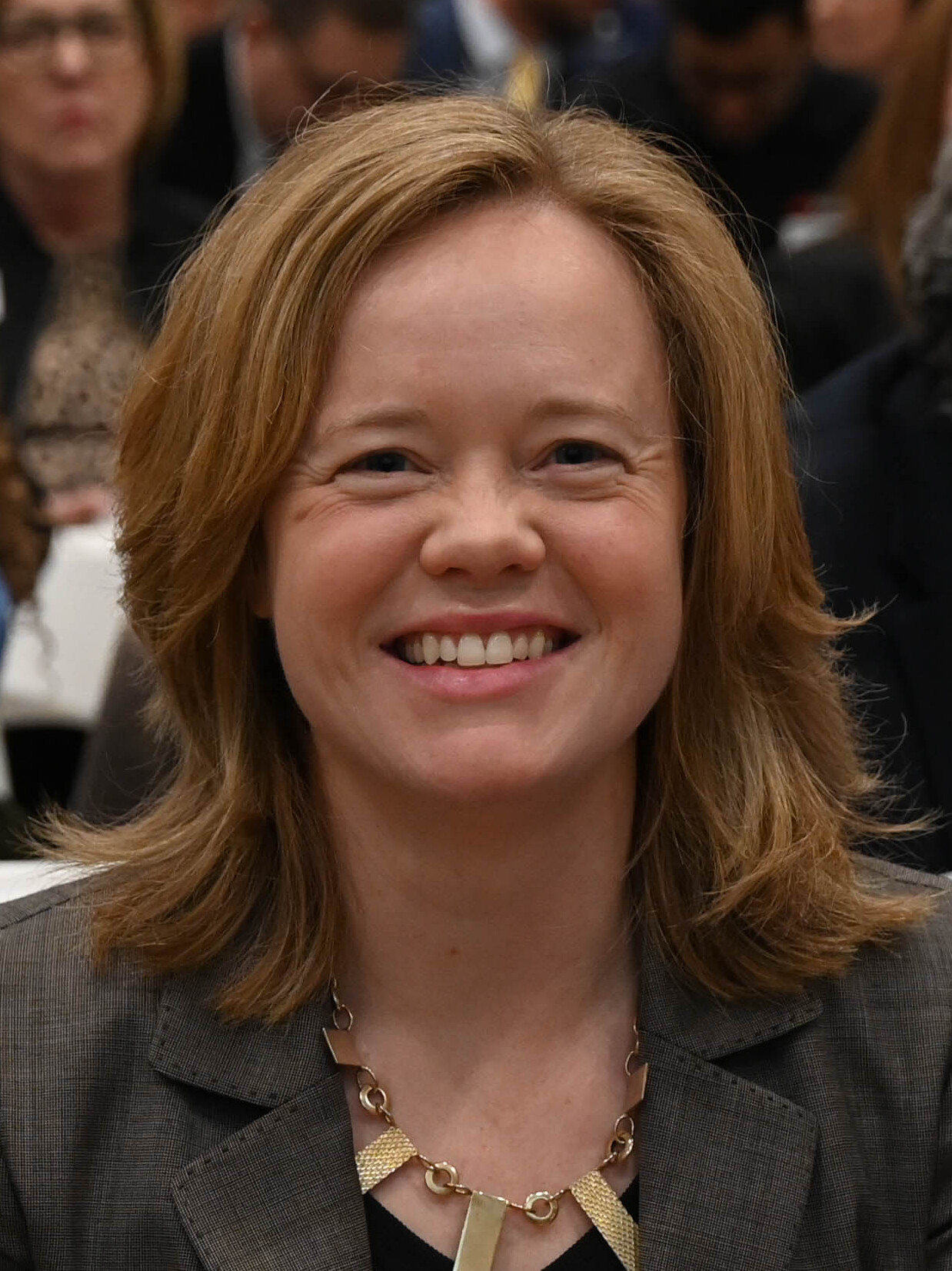
- Gay in 2025

27th Lieutenant Governor of Delaware
- Incumbent
- Assumed office January 21, 2025
- Governor: Matt Meyer
- Preceded by: Bethany Hall-Long

Member of the Delaware Senate from the 5th district
- In office January 12, 2021 – January 21, 2025
- Preceded by: Catherine Cloutier
- Succeeded by: Ray Seigfried

Personal details
- Born: June 14, 1986 (age 40) Wilmington, Delaware, U.S.
- Party: Democratic
- Spouse: Olin Gay
- Children: 2
- Education: Brown University (BA); Boston University (JD)

Kyle Evans Gay (born June 14, 1986) is an American politician and attorney. A member of the Democratic Party, she has served as the 27th lieutenant governor of Delaware since 2025. She was previously a member of the Delaware Senate representing the 5th district from 2021 to 2025.

== Early life and career ==
Gay was born in Wilmington, Delaware and grew up in Kennett Square, Pennsylvania, graduating from Unionville High School in 2004. She then obtained a Bachelor's degree in international relations and history from Brown University in 2008 and a Juris Doctor from Boston University School of Law in 2012.

She began her legal career as a deputy attorney general in the Delaware Department of Justice before clerking for the Delaware Superior Court. Since 2014, she worked in private practice, specializing in business litigation in Delaware's courts, while also providing pro bono legal services for children in foster care.

Gay has been involved with various nonprofit and civic organizations in Delaware. She served on the Delaware Public Integrity Commission, was president of the Junior League of Wilmington, and co-founded the Spur Impact Association, which promotes civic engagement among young professionals. She is a board member of the Delaware Bar Foundation.

== State senator ==
=== Elections ===
In 2020, running on a platform advocating for the adoption of the Delaware Equal Rights Amendment, a state constitutional amendment that prohibits discrimination based on sex, Gay was elected to the Delaware Senate. She defeated Republican incumbent Catherine Cloutier to become the first Democrat to represent the 5th district in over four decades.

She was re-elected to the Senate in 2022.

=== Tenure ===
During her time in the Senate, Gay chaired the Senate Elections and Government Affairs Committee, Senate Judiciary Committee, and was co-chair of the Joint Legislative Oversight and Sunset Committee. She was also a member of the Senate Transportation Committee, the Senate Veterans Affairs Committee, the Senate Education Committee, and the Rules and Ethics Committee.

She introduced and passed several pieces of legislation including SB 5, creating an automatic voter registration system at the Delaware Division of Motor Vehicles; SB 205, expanding the availability of free feminine hygiene products at public and charter schools; and SB 301, requiring public universities to provide access to pregnancy termination medication and emergency contraception. Gay introduced SB 343, which would have added language to the Delaware Bill of Rights codifying the right to reproductive freedom, including the right to obtain an abortion, but the bill has yet to advance from committee. She was a sponsor on HB 70, which eliminated the death penalty in Delaware.

== Lieutenant Governor of Delaware ==
In 2024, Gay defeated Republican nominee Ruth Briggs King in the Delaware lieutenant gubernatorial election, becoming the 27th Lieutenant Governor of Delaware. Her main campaign themes included reproductive freedom, gun violence prevention, and economic initiatives such as economic mobility for working parents, job creation, and support for small and local businesses. She was sworn into office on January 21, 2025, succeeding Bethany Hall-Long.

== Personal life ==
Gay lives in the Heatherbrooke neighborhood of Wilmington, New Castle County with her husband Olin and their two daughters.

Delaware Senate
Preceded by Catherine Cloutier	Member of the Delaware Senate from the 5th district 2021–2025	Succeeded by Ray Seigfried
Political offices
Vacant Title last held by Bethany Hall-Long	Lieutenant Governor of Delaware; 2025–present	Incumbent
