= 2024 Delaware gubernatorial election =

- November 5, 2024

Nominee	Matt Meyer	Mike Ramone
Party	Democratic	Republican
Popular vote	279,585	219,050
Percentage	56.07%	43.93%
- Meyer: 50–60% 60–70% 70–80% 80–90% >90% Ramone: 50–60% 60–70% 70–80% 80–90% Tie: 50% No votes
Governor before election
John Carney
Democratic
Elected Governor
Matt Meyer
Democratic

The 2024 Delaware gubernatorial election was held on November 5, 2024, to elect the governor of Delaware. Incumbent Democratic governor John Carney was term-limited and could not seek re-election to a third term in office. Primary elections took place on September 10, 2024, in which Democratic New Castle County Executive Matt Meyer and Republican state representative Mike Ramone won their parties' nominations.

Meyer comfortably won the election, albeit by the closest margin since 2004. Meyer's 56% of the vote is the lowest for the Democrats since that election, while Ramone's 44% is the highest since for Republicans.

Republicans have not won a gubernatorial election in Delaware since 1988.

== Democratic primary ==
=== Candidates ===
==== Nominee ====
- Matt Meyer, New Castle County executive

==== Eliminated in primary ====
- Bethany Hall-Long, lieutenant governor of Delaware
- Collin O'Mara, president of the National Wildlife Federation and former secretary of the Delaware Department of Natural Resources and Environmental Control

==== Declined ====
- Colleen Davis, Delaware State Treasurer (ran for U.S. House)
- Lisa Blunt Rochester, U.S. representative for Delaware's at-large congressional district (ran for U.S. Senate)

=== Endorsements ===
Bethany Hall-Long

Statewide officials

- John Carney, governor of Delaware (2017–2025) and former U.S. representative for Delaware's at-large congressional district (2011–2017)

Political parties

- Delaware Democratic Party

Organizations

- EMILY's List

Labor unions

- Delaware State Education Association
Matt Meyer

State legislators

- Nnamdi Chukwuocha, state representative from the 1st district (2018–present) and 17th Poet Laureate of Delaware (2015–present)

Local officials

- Polly Sierer, former mayor of Newark

Organizations

- Delaware Democratic Party PRIDE Caucus

Newspapers

- The Philadelphia Inquirer
Collin O'Mara

Organizations

- Center for Biological Diversity Action Fund
- Friends of the Earth Action

Political parties

- Working Families Party

=== Polling ===
Poll source	Date(s) administered	Sample size (Note: Key: A – all adults RV – registered voters LV – likely voters V – unclear)	Margin of error	Bethany Hall-Long	Matt Meyer	Collin O'Mara	Other	Undecided
Trailblazer Opinion Strategies (D) (Note: Poll sponsored by O'Mara's campaign)	August 27, 2024	—	—	19%	33%	17%	—	31%
Slingshot Strategies (Note: Poll sponsored by Citizens for a New Delaware Way PAC, which opposes Hall-Long)	August 8–13, 2024	500 (RV)	± 4.4%	23%	27%	11%	7% (Note: "Someone else" with 7%)	31%
Concord Public Opinion Partners (Note: Poll sponsored by Education Reform Now Advocacy)	August 4–7, 2024	453 (RV)	± 4.6%	23%	30%	8%	—	40%
Public Policy Polling (D) (Note: Poll sponsored by the Democratic Lieutenant Governors Association, which supports Hall-Long)	July 16–17, 2024	661 (LV)	± 3.8%	31%	19%	9%	—	41%
Slingshot Strategies	July 5–9, 2024	446 (RV)	± 4.6%	27%	27%	7%	5% (Note: "Someone else" with 5%)	34%
Public Policy Polling (D) (Note: Poll sponsored by Hall-Long's campaign)	January 10–11, 2024	643 (LV)	± 3.9%	30%	23%	—	—	47%

=== Results ===
Results by county: Meyer: 40–50%; 50–60%; Hall-Long: 50–60%

Democratic primary results
Party	Candidate	Votes	%
Democratic	Matt Meyer	40,518	46.98%
Democratic	Bethany Hall-Long	31,588	36.62%
Democratic	Collin O'Mara	14,142	16.40%
Total votes		86,248	100.0%

==== Results by county ====
County	Matt Meyer		Bethany Hall-Long		Collin O'Mara	
County	#	%	#	%	#	%
Kent	3,881	33.6%	5,891	51.0%	1,771	15.3%
New Castle	27,790	50.4%	18,297	33.2%	8,847	16.1%
Sussex	9,041	46.2%	7,400	37.8%	3,330	17.0%
Total	40,518	47.0%	31,588	36.6%	14,142	16.4%

== Republican primary ==
=== Candidates ===
==== Nominee ====
- Mike Ramone, Minority Leader of the Delaware House of Representatives (2023–2024) from the 21st district (2008–2024)

==== Eliminated in primary ====
- Jerry Price, retired police officer
- Bobby Williamson, contractor

==== Withdrawn ====
- Julianne Murray, chair of the Delaware Republican Party, nominee for governor in 2020, and nominee for attorney general in 2022

=== Results ===
Primary results by county: Ramone: 60–70%; 70–80%

Republican primary results
Party	Candidate	Votes	%
Republican	Mike Ramone	26,414	72.29%
Republican	Jerry Price	5,971	16.34%
Republican	Bobby Williamson	4,153	11.37%
Total votes		36,538	100.0%

=== Results by county ===
County	Mike Ramone		Jerry Price		Bobby Williamson	
County	#	%	#	%	#	%
Kent	5,012	70.0%	1,218	17.0%	932	13.0%
New Castle	9,064	77.8%	1,521	13.1%	1,059	9.1%
Sussex	12,338	69.6%	3,232	18.2%	2,162	12.2%
Total	26,414	72.3%	5,971	16.3%	4,153	11.4%

== General election ==
=== Predictions ===
Source	Ranking	As of
The Cook Political Report	Solid D	June 13, 2024
Inside Elections	Solid D	July 14, 2023
Sabato's Crystal Ball	Safe D	June 4, 2024
RCP	Solid D	July 13, 2024
Elections Daily	Safe D	July 12, 2023

=== Post-primary endorsements ===
Matt Meyer (D)

Organizations

- Giffords

=== Polling ===
Poll source	Date(s) administered	Sample size	Margin of error	Matt Meyer (D)	Mike Ramone (R)	Other	Undecided
Slingshot Strategies (Note: Poll sponsored by Citizens for Judicial Fairness)	September 19–21, 2024	500 (RV)	—	52%	25%	5%	18%
University of Delaware	September 11–19, 2024	400 (RV)	± 5.8%	51%	32%	–	17%

=== Results ===
2024 Delaware gubernatorial election
Party	Candidate	Votes	%	±%
Democratic	Matt Meyer	279,585	56.07%	−3.39%
Republican	Mike Ramone	219,050	43.93%	+5.30%
Total votes		498,635	100.00%	
Democratic hold				

==== By county ====
By county

County	Matt Meyer Democratic		Mike Ramone Republican		Margin		Total votes
County	#	%	#	%	#	%	Total votes
Kent	43,179	50.25	42,750	49.75	429	0.50	85,929
New Castle	172,412	64.30	95,746	35.70	76,666	28.60	268,158
Sussex	63,994	44.27	80,554	55.73	-16,560	-11.46	144,548
Totals	279,585	56.07	219,050	43.93	60,535	12.14	498,635

== Notes ==
Partisan clients
