= Frank Burns (Delaware politician) =

American politician

Member of the Delaware House of Representatives from the 21st district
- Incumbent
- Assumed office November 5, 2024
- Preceded by: Mike Ramone

Personal details
- Party: Democratic
- Other political affiliations: Working Families Party
- Website: Official website

Frank Burns is an American politician. He is a Democratic member of the Delaware House of Representatives, representing district 21. He replaced Republican Mike Ramone, who resigned in order to run for governor.

== Biography ==
Burns earned a PhD from the University of Pennsylvania School of Medicine. He went on to direct laboratories at MCP Hahnemann University and Jefferson Medical College. He lived in Pennsylvania while commuting to work in Delaware for several years before finally moving to Delaware in 2017. He runs a small biotech company.

Prior to running for office, Burns had been involved in environmental and climate advocacy. In 2022, he filed just before the filing deadline to run against incumbent Republican Mike Ramone to represent 21st district in the Delaware House of Representatives. He lost in the general election by 35 votes, but the small margin triggered a mandatory recount. Although both candidates lost votes in the recount, the difference increased by six votes to 41.

In July 2023, Burns announced that he would run against Ramone again. Ramone subsequently announced he would not seek reelection to the House so that he could run for governor of Delaware, and Brenda Mennella became the Republican nominee. Burns faced nonprofit director Michael Smith in the Democratic primary election, winning by 30 votes. He made education funding reform a priority in his campaign and stated there was a need for an independent office of the inspector general to investigate state corruption. He was also endorsed by the Working Families Party. He won the general election over Mennella with 58% of the vote.
