= Mike Ramone =

American politician (born 1961)

Minority Leader of the Delaware House of Representatives
- In office January 10, 2023 – November 5, 2024
- Preceded by: Daniel Short
- Succeeded by: Timothy Dukes

Member of the Delaware House of Representatives from the 21st district
- In office November 4, 2008 – November 5, 2024
- Preceded by: Pamela Maier
- Succeeded by: Frank Burns

Personal details
- Born: July 11, 1961 (age 65) Wilmington, Delaware, U.S.
- Party: Republican
- Education: University of Delaware (attended)
- Website: Campaign website

Michael J. Ramone (born July 11, 1961) is an American politician from the state of Delaware. A member of the Republican Party, Ramone served in the Delaware House of Representatives from 2008 to 2024, when he resigned to run for governor in the 2024 election. He subsequently lost in the general election to Matt Meyer. He was succeeded in the House by Democratic candidate Frank Burns, who had lost to Ramone in 2022.

== Early life ==
Ramone attended St. Mark's High School in suburban Wilmington, and then the University of Delaware.

At 20 years old, Ramone bought his first flower shop. After the business was hit by lightning and burned down, Ramone began working as a swimming instructor and pool attendant in order to meet payroll.

== Political career ==
Ramone was elected to the Delaware House of Representatives in 2008. During the 2022 lame-duck session, House Republicans elected Ramone as their minority leader for the next term.

In 2024, Ramone announced that he would not run for reelection and instead would run for governor of Delaware in the 2024 election. He won the Republican primary on September 10, 2024, and faced Democratic candidate Matt Meyer in the general election. Ramone lost to Meyer, 56% to 44%.

== Personal life ==
Ramone is a Catholic and has three children with his wife, Lisa.

== Electoral history ==
- In 2008, Ramone won the general election against Democratic candidate Patricia Creedon.
- In 2010, Ramone won the general election unopposed.
- In 2012, Ramone won the general election unopposed.
- In 2014, Ramone won the general election against Green candidate David A. McCorquodale.
- In 2016, Ramone won a rematch against McCorquodale in the general election.
- In 2018, Ramone won the general election against Democratic candidate Stephanie Barry.
- In 2020, Ramone won the general election against Democratic candidate Stephanie Barry.
- In the 2022 general election, Ramone defeated Democratic candidate Frank Burns by a total of 35 votes where 8,725 votes were cast.
- In the 2024 gubernatorial election, Ramone lost to Democratic candidate Matt Meyer.

Delaware House of Representatives
Preceded by Daniel Short	Minority Leader of Delaware House of Representatives; 2023–2024	Succeeded by Timothy Dukes
