= Daniel Short =

American politician

Minority Leader of the Delaware House of Representatives
- In office January 8, 2013 – January 10, 2023
- Preceded by: Gregory Lavelle
- Succeeded by: Michael Ramone

Member of the Delaware House of Representatives from the 39th district
- Incumbent
- Assumed office November 8, 2006
- Preceded by: Tina Fallon

Personal details
- Born: July 11, 1961 (age 65) Wilmington, Delaware, U.S.
- Party: Republican
- Education: Delaware Technical Community College; University of Delaware
- Website: Official website

Daniel B. Short (born July 11, 1961) is an American politician. He is a Republican member of the Delaware House of Representatives, representing District 39. He was elected in 2006 to replace retiring Republican Tina Fallon in the House, after having lost a race for the Delaware Senate in the previous election. He served as the House Minority Leader between 2013-2023, and was previously the minority whip. He also served as a city council member and mayor of Seaford, Delaware. He earned an associate degree from the University of Delaware.

== Electoral history ==
- In 2004, Short challenged incumbent Democrat Robert Venables Sr. for a seat in the Delaware Senate but lost the general election.
- In 2006, Short ran for a seat in the Delaware House and won the general election with 3,370 votes (68.6%) against Democratic nominee Richard Sternberg.
- In 2008, Short won the general election with 5,185 votes (68.8%) against Democratic nominee Jerry Semper, who had also qualified and received votes as the Working Families Party candidate.
- In 2010, Short was unopposed for the general election, winning 4,562 votes.
- In 2012, Short won the Republican primary with 1,046 votes (80.2%), and was unopposed for the general election, winning 6,191 votes.
- In 2014, Short won the general election with 3,977 votes (92.9%) against Libertarian nominee James W. Brittingham.
- In 2016, Short won the general election with 6,643 votes (91.3%) in a rematch against Libertarian nominee James W. Brittingham.
- In 2018, Short was unopposed in the general election, winning 5,452 votes.

Delaware House of Representatives
Preceded by Gregory Lavelle	Minority Leader of Delaware House of Representatives; 2013–2023	Succeeded by Michael Ramone
