= Sherry Dorsey Walker =

American politician

Member of the Delaware House of Representatives from the 3rd district
- In office November 7, 2018 – January 14, 2025
- Preceded by: Helene Keeley
- Succeeded by: Josue Ortega

Personal details
- Party: Democratic
- Education: University of Delaware (BA); Howard University (MFA)
- Website: Official website

Sherry Dorsey Walker is an American politician who served as a Democratic member of the Delaware House of Representatives, representing District 3 from 2018 to 2025. In 2018, Dorsey Walker was elected after winning a three-way primary race against Jim Miller and Paul Falkowski, where she received over 68 percent of the votes. She was unopposed in the general election. She did not seek reelection to the house, rather running in the 2024 Delaware lieutenant gubernatorial election, where she lost in the primary.
