= Paul Baumbach =

American politician

Member of the Delaware House of Representatives from the 23rd district
- In office November 7, 2012 – November 5, 2024
- Preceded by: Teresa Schooley
- Succeeded by: Mara Gorman

Personal details
- Party: Democratic
- Education: University of Delaware; Villanova University
- Website: Official website

Paul S. Baumbach is an American politician. He is a Democratic member of the Delaware House of Representatives, representing District 23. He was elected in 2012 after the retirement of Democrat Teresa Schooley.

Baumbach earned his MS in computer science from Villanova University.

== Political career ==
=== Electoral history ===
- In 2012, Baumbach won the three-way Democratic primary with 546 votes (38.9%), and went on to win the general election with 4,770 votes (57.3%) against Republican nominee Mark Doughty.
- In 2014, Baumbach was unopposed in the general election and won 3,740 votes.
- In 2016, Baumbach was unopposed in the general election and won 6,550 votes.
- In 2018, Baumbach was unopposed in the general election and won 5,786 votes.

=== Tenure ===
Baumbach has been a long advocate and supporter of assisted suicide. Since 2015, he has campaigned for the state of Delaware to legalize assisted suicide. He has proposed several bills to authorize doctors to prescribe life-ending medications to patients who request it. In 2022, he created and sponsored a new bill to legalize the process. The bill was heard before the House Health and Human Development Committee, and narrowly passed it by a 8–7 vote. During the hearings, about 60 to 70 people testified about the legislation.
