= Ruth Briggs King =

American politician

Ruth Briggs
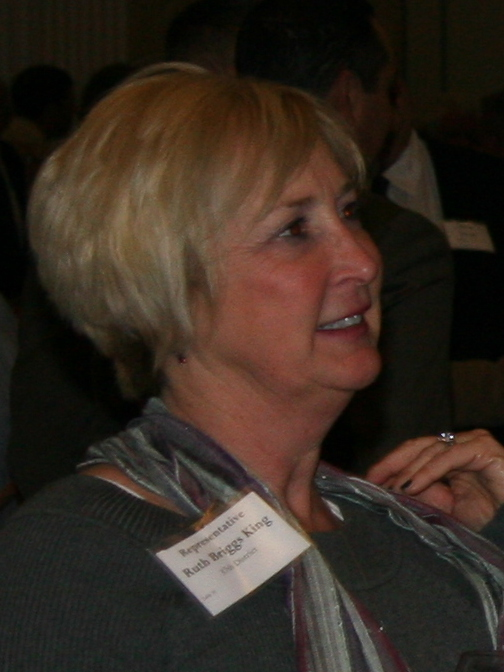

Member of the Delaware House of Representatives from the 37th district
- In office September 14, 2009 – November 15, 2023
- Preceded by: Joseph W. Booth
- Succeeded by: Valerie Jones Giltner

Personal details
- Born: March 8, 1956 (age 70) Milford, Delaware, U.S.
- Party: Republican
- Education: Delaware Technical Community College (AA); Wilmington University (BA, MA)
- Website: Campaign website

Ruth Briggs King (born March 8, 1956) is an American politician. A Republican, she served as a member of the Delaware House of Representatives, representing district 37, from 2009 to 2023. In 2024, she ran for lieutenant governor but lost to Democratic nominee Kyle Evans Gay in the general election.

== Biography ==
Briggs King earned her AA in medical technology from Delaware Technical Community College and her BA and MA in human resources from Wilmington College.

Briggs King first ran for office in 2009, losing in the Republican primary to represent district 41 in the Delaware House of Representatives. She was subsequently elected in 2009 to replace Republican Joseph Booth, who had won a special election for the Delaware Senate. She resigned from the House in November 2023. In May 2024, she announced her candidacy for lieutenant governor of Delaware. In the November general election, she lost to Democratic nominee Kyle Evans Gay, earning 44.8% of the vote.

Briggs King has worked as a human resources consultant for Workforce Solutions since 2019. She is married to Stanley King, and they have two sons.

== Electoral history ==
- In 2000, Briggs King ran for District 41 in the Republican primary but lost. The incumbent representative, Democrat Charles West, went on to win the general election and served until 2003.
- In 2009, Briggs King won the special election to replace Joseph Booth in District 37 with 2,429 votes (53.6%) against Democratic nominee Robert Robertson.
- In 2010, Briggs King won the general election with 5,149 votes (61.8%) against Democratic nominee Frank Shade.
- In 2012, Briggs King won the general election with 5,026 votes (54.8%) against Democratic nominee Elizabeth McGinn.
- In 2014, Briggs King won the general election with 4,173 votes (65.3%) against Democratic nominee Paulette Ann Rappa.
- In 2016, Briggs King won the general election with 6,720 votes (62.5%) in a rematch against Democratic nominee Paulette Ann Rappa.
- In 2018, Briggs King was unopposed in the general election and won 6,853 votes.
