= List of U.S. state poets laureate =

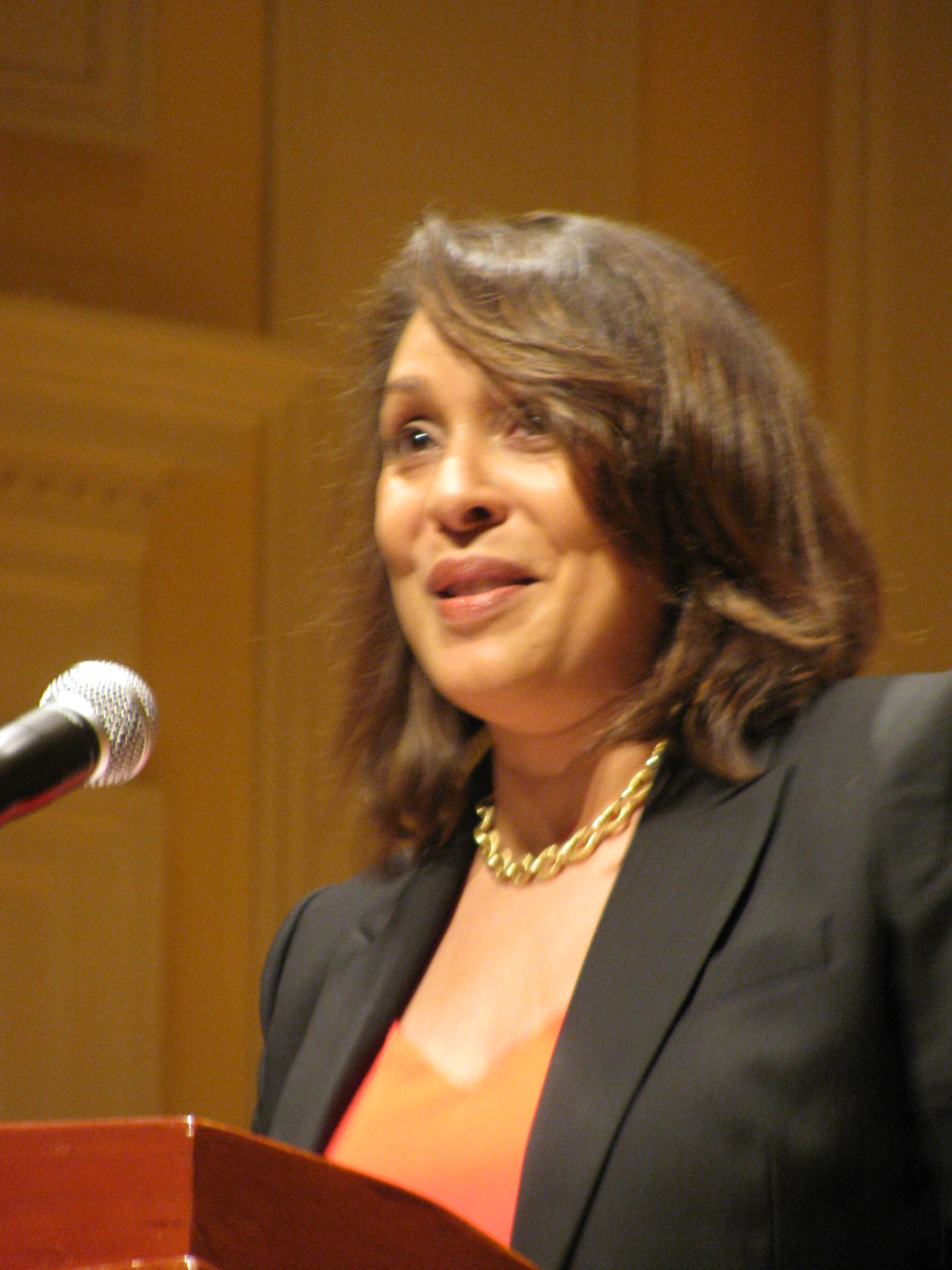
Pulitzer Prize-winning poet Natasha Trethewey was U.S. Poet Laureate (2012–2014) and Poet Laureate of Mississippi (2012–2016).

Many of the states in the United States have established the post of poet laureate to which a prominent poet residing in the respective state is appointed. The responsibilities of the state poets laureate are similar to those of the Poet Laureate of the United Kingdom and the equivalent Poet Laureate Consultant in Poetry to the Library of Congress in the United States, to make public appearances at poetry readings or literary events, and to promote awareness of poetry within their geographical region.

As of 2017, 46 states and the District of Columbia have poets laureate, although a few are presently vacant. The terms can vary in length from state to state. Most states appoint a poet laureate for a one- or two-year term, fewer to several years, and some states appoint a poet to a lifetime tenure. Two states, New Jersey and Pennsylvania, previously had such posts but abolished them in 2003. Michigan had a single poet laureate from 1952 to 1959. There has never been an official State Poet Laureate in Massachusetts. While Idaho does not have a post of "poet laureate", per se, the state appoints a "Writer in Residence", which can be held by a novelist or poet. Alaska has similarly expanded their program to include other genres of writing, calling the program the Alaska State Writer Laureate. The state of New York has both a State Poet and a State Author.

== List of state poets laureate ==
The following lists of state poets laureate below are divided by state. The name of the current poet laureate is in bold.

=== Alabama ===
The current poet laureate of Alabama is Dr. Jacqueline Allen Trimble. Alabama has had an official poet laureate since 1930. The Alabama Writer's Cooperative (formerly the Alabama Writers' Conclave), described as "a voluntary organization of Alabama historians, playwrights, fiction writers, poets, and newspaper writers" first recommended in 1930 Samuel Minturn Peck to Governor Bibb Graves. The state legislature approved a bill to create the office on March 5, 1931. After the death of Dr. Peck, the position was not filled and was revived in 1954 due to the efforts Mary B. Ward, the president of the Alabama Writer's Conclave, who became the state's second laureate.

At present, a poet selected must have been an Alabama resident for at least 15 years prior to the appointment, and when commissioned by the governor, is appointed to serve on a four-year renewable basis. Before 1983, neither the organization or the state statute provided for a specific term length. The Alabama Writers' Cooperative will recommend candidate who is elected by the organization's membership at its annual meeting. The governor subsequently commissions the candidate. A candidate for poet laureate need not be a member of the Alabama Writers' Cooperative to be nominated or selected.

=== Alaska ===
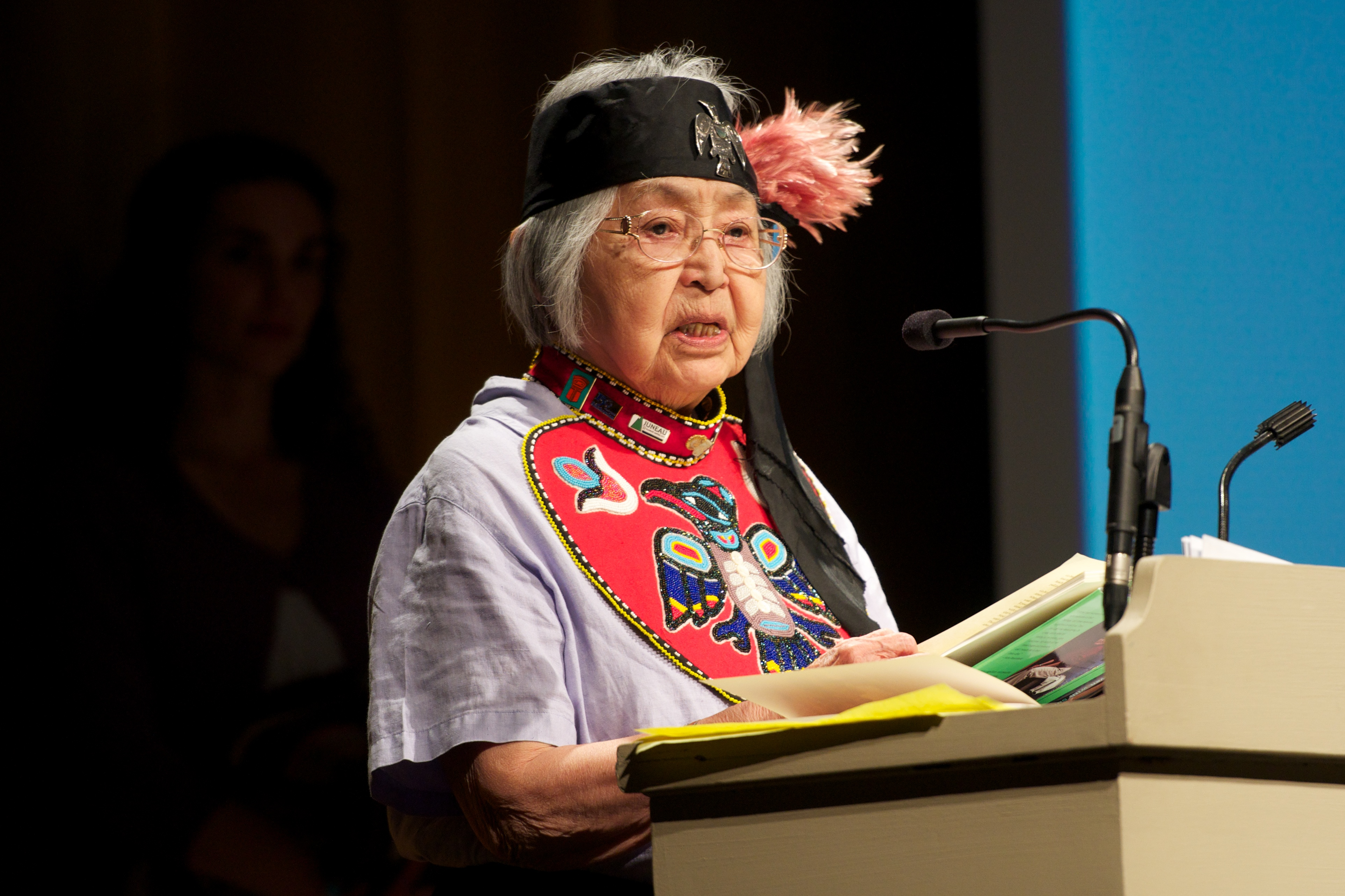
Nora Dauenhauer, Poet Laureate of Alaska

The position of Poet Laureate was created in 1963 (House Resolution 25). The official name was changed in 1996 to recognize and honor all genres of writing. The position is selected by the Alaska State Council on the Arts.

=== Arizona ===
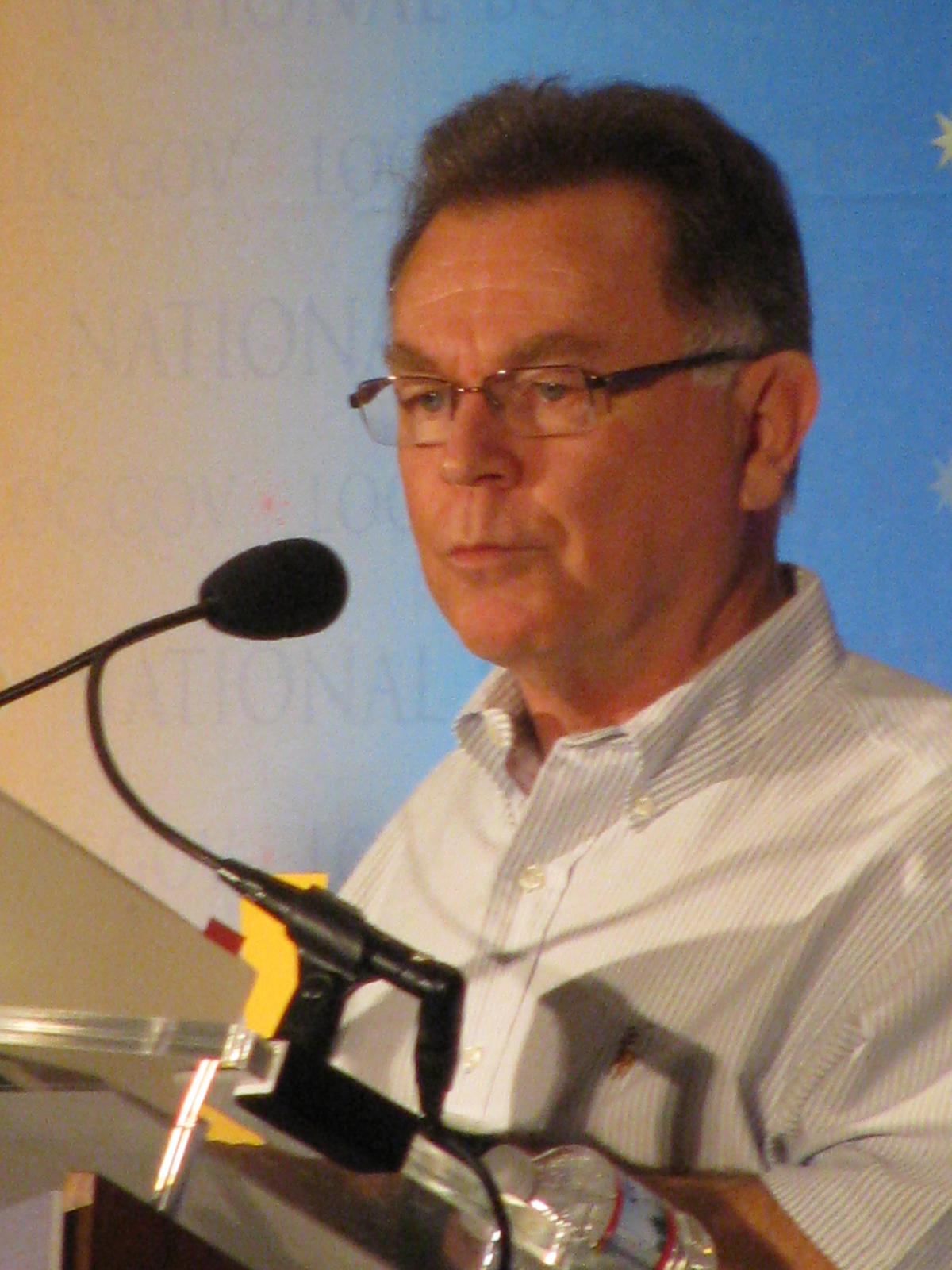
Alberto Rios, first poet laureate of Arizona

The state of Arizona established a state Poet Laureate position in 2013, appointing Alberto Ríos as the inaugural Poet Laureate.

=== Arkansas ===
Charles T. Davis, appointed in 1923, was the inaugural poet laureate of Arkansas. He served in the position until his death on December 21, 1945. The position was vacant from 1946 until 1953, when Rosa Zagnoni Marinoni was appointed. Upon Marinoni's death in 1970, Governor Winthrop Rockefeller named Ercil Brown interim laureate. When legislature reconvened, three candidates had emerged: Anna Nash Yarborough, Lily Peter, and Brown. The legislature declined to decide and instead in 1971 passed Act 90, which assigned the responsibility to the governor. Governor Dale Bumpers announced Lily Peter's appointment on October 6, 1971. Following Peter's death, Verna Lee Hinegardner was appointed by Governor Bill Clinton on October 4, 1991, serving until 2003. In 2003, Governor Mike Huckabee appointed Peggy Vining. Before this time, the poet laureateship had been considered a life appointment and publicity ensued but in the end the appointment stood. Peggy Vining served as Poet Laureate from 2003 until her death in 2017. The Legislature changed the term for Arkansas Poet Laureate during 2017 to 4 years. The current Poet Laureate of Arkansas is Suzanne Underwood Rhodes, who was appointed to a four-year term in 2022.

=== California ===
The state of California established a state Poet Laureate under Governor Hiram Warren Johnson and appointed Ina Donna Coolbrith on June 30, 1915. Coolbrith was later acknowledged as the "Loved Laurel-Crowned Poet of California" by a 1919 state Senate resolution, retaining the title until her death in 1928. Juan Felipe Herrera was appointed by Gov. Jerry Brown in March 2012. It was last held by Dana Gioia from 2015 to 2018. The current poet laureate is Lee Herrick.

=== Colorado ===
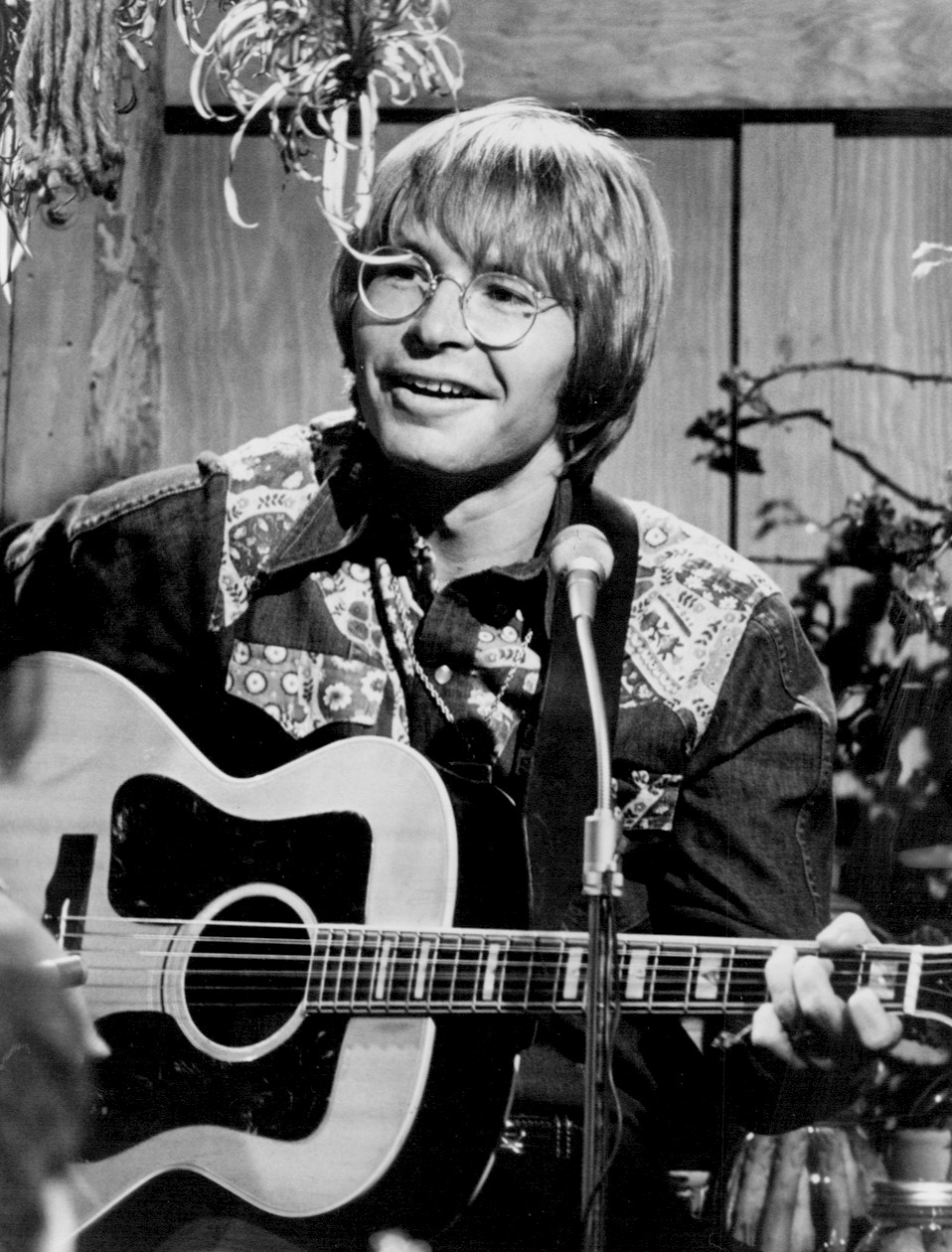
John Denver was named poet laureate of Colorado in 1974

Colorado Poets Laureate are appointed to four-year terms. They are nominated by Colorado Creative Industries and Colorado Humanities & Center for the Book, and chosen by the Governor. The State of Colorado also appointed singer/songwriter writer John Denver in 1974.

The following have held the position:

==== Cities/Regions ====
===== Aurora =====
- Jovan Mays (2013 - 2017)
- Assetou Xango (2017 - 2020)
- Ahja Fox (2022 - 2026)

===== Boulder =====
- Reg Saner (1999 - ?)

===== Denver =====
- Chris Ransick served as poet laureate of Denver 2006 to 2010.

===== Fort Collins =====
- Matt Sage and Michael Bussman (2012 - 2013)
- Jason Hardung (2013 - 2014)
- Chloe Leisure (2014 - 2016)
- Aby Kaupang (2016 - 2017)
- Felicia Zamora (2017 - 2018)
- Natalie Giarratano (2018 -2020)
- Autumn Bernhardt (2020 - 2022)
- Ally Eden (2022 - 2024)
- Melissa Mitchell (2024 - 2026)

===== Lafayette =====
- ZBassSpeaks, a.k.a. Z (2024 - 2026)

===== Pikes Peak =====
- Janice Gould served as poet laureate of Pikes Peak, representing the Pikes Peak Library District which includes the greater Colorado Springs area, from 2014 to 2016.

=== Connecticut ===
José B. González, CT Poet Laureate

Jose B. Gonzalez is the current Poet Laureate. The Poet Laureate of Connecticut was established in 1985 by Public Act 85-221 of the Connecticut General Assembly. Five-year residents of the state with a demonstrated career in poetry are eligible for the honorary appointment as an advocate for poetry and literary arts.

=== Delaware ===
Poets are appointed to the position by the governor. The first poet laureate of Delaware was Edna Deemer Leach appointed in 1947. Nnamdi Chukwuocha and Albert Mills—twin brothers who are known as the "Twin Poets"—were appointed 17th Poets Laureate of the State of Delaware on December 13, 2015. According to the Library of Congress, they are the first co-laureates appointed by a state and the first siblings to share the position. Predecessors include Fleda Brown and JoAnn Balingit.

=== District of Columbia ===
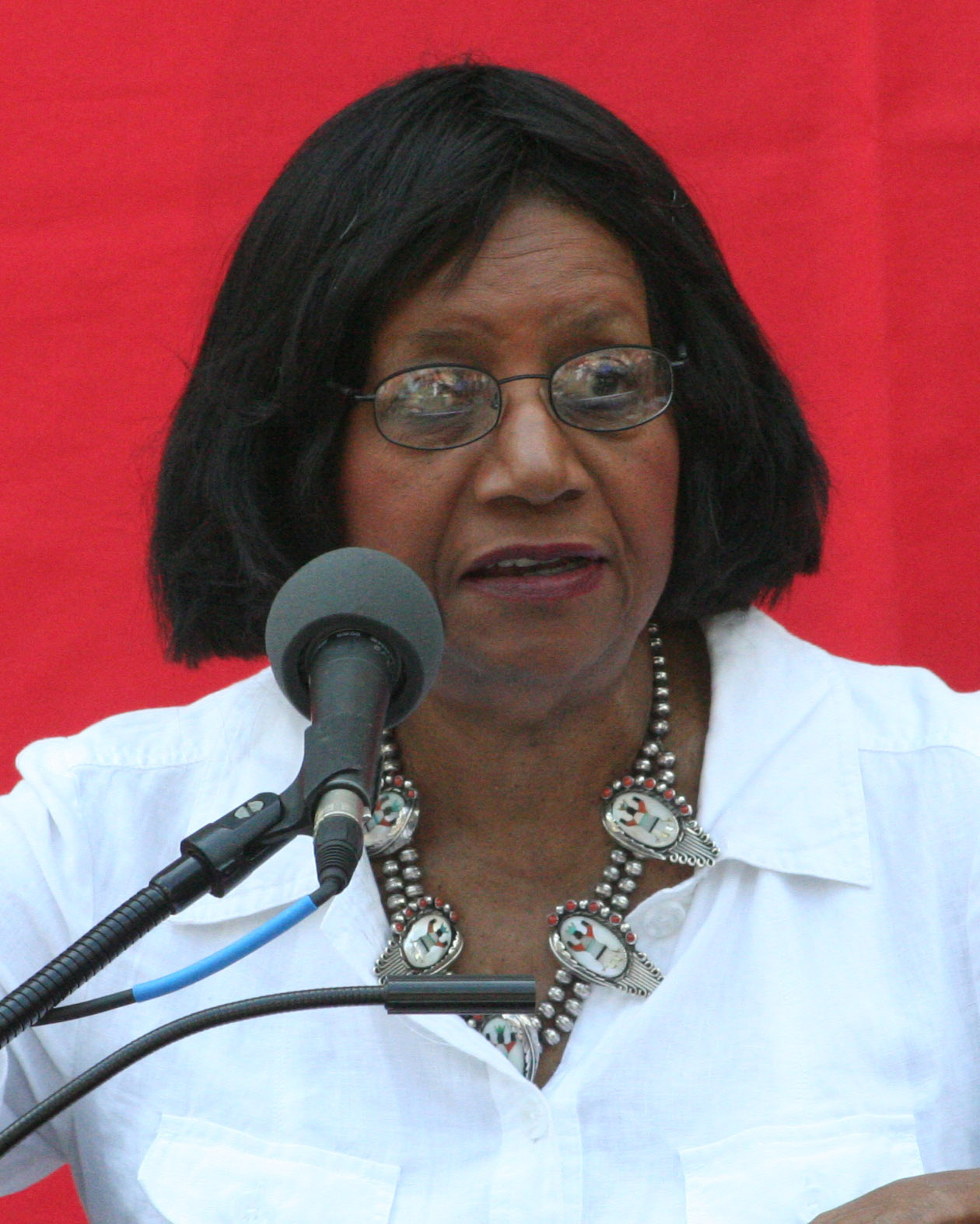
Dolores Kendrick was the second poet laureate of Washington D.C.

The United States' capital, the District of Columbia, created the position of Poet Laureate of the District of Columbia in 1984 during the mayoralty of Marion Barry. The position is filled by appointment from the mayor of the district the DC Commission on the Arts and Humanities. The District of Columbia's poet laureate program is currently stalled. Only two poets laureate have been appointed since the creation of the position. Sterling Allen Brown was appointed by Mayor Marion Barry, serving from 1984 until his death in 1989. Dolores Kendrick was appointed by Mayor Anthony A. Williams, serving from 1999 until her death in 2017.

=== Florida ===
Poets Laureate of Florida are appointed by the governor and the Division of Arts and Culture. They first served lifetime, unpaid appointments, until June 20, 2014, when HB 513 established a four-year term. The first poet laureate of Florida was Franklin L. Wood, appointed in 1929 and died soon after assuming office. Vivian Laramore Rader was appointed in 1931 and served until her death in 1975. Edmund Skellings was appointed in 1980. A stroke that impaired his speech and limited his ability to do all of his official duties. He died August 19, 2012, leaving the post vacant.Peter Meinke currently holds this position and was appointed on June 15, 2015.

=== Georgia ===
Frank Lebby Stanton served from 1925 to 1927 as Georgia's first poet laureate. Successors include Ernest Neal, Conrad Aiken, David Bottoms, Judson Mitcham, and Chelsea Rathburn.

=== Hawaii ===
Prior to statehood Don Blanding, originally from Oklahoma, was unofficially referred to as the poet laureate of Hawaii. In 1951 Hawaii Territorial Senator Thelma Akana Harrison in concurrent resolution 28, declared Lloyd Stone, who was originally from California, poet laureate. When the modern program was established, Native Hawaiian Kealoha was appointed on May 3, 2012 by Governor Neil Abercrombie., and he is the first poet laureate for the state of Hawaii, serving through 2022. Brandy Nālani McDougall began her appointment as Poet Laureate of Hawaii in 2023, which she will serve through 2025.

=== Idaho ===
Irene Welch Grissom served from 1923 to 1948 as Idaho's first poet laureate. Sudie Stuart Hager served as the second poet laureate from 1949 to 1982. After 1982, the title was changed to Writer in Residence. Kerri Webster began her tenure as Writer in Residence in 2023.

=== Illinois ===
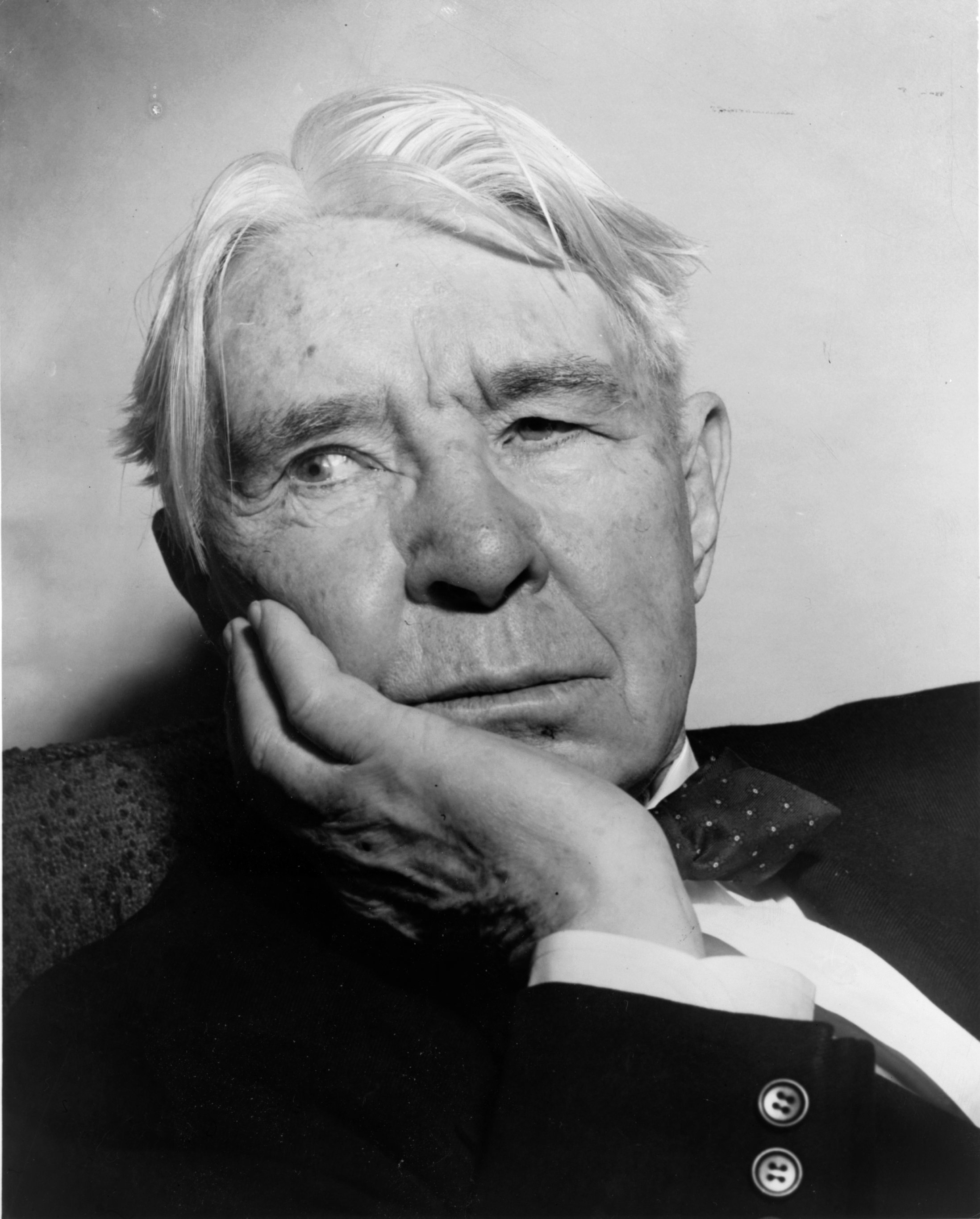
Carl Sandburg was the second poet laureate of Illinois

The state's first three Poets Laureate were named at the initiative of individual governors and served for life. In 2003 the title was made into a four-year renewable award.

The Illinois governor posthumously named songwriter John Prine honorary poet laureate in 2021.

=== Indiana ===
Indiana has the unique situation of having two posts: an official "state poet laureate" (created in 2005) and the unofficial post of "premier poet" created in 1929 occupied by Sarah E. Morin. Joyce Brinkman was appointed as the first poet laureate of Indiana, serving from 2005 to 2008. The position has been occupied by Curtis L. Crisler as of 2024.

=== Iowa ===
The position was created July 1, 1999 by Subchapter 303.89 of the Iowa Code with a two-year renewable term. Marvin Bell was Iowa's first Poet Laureate, from 2000 to 2004, followed by Robert Dana from 2004 to 2008, Mary Swander from 2009 to 2019, and Debra Marquart from 2019 to 2023. Vince Gotera is the current Poet Laureate of Iowa. His two-year term started in 2024.

=== Kansas ===
The current poet laureate of Kansas is Traci Brimhall, serving from 2022 to 2024. Predecessors include Jonathan Holden, Denise Low, Eric McHenry, Caryn Mirriam-Goldberg, Wyatt Townley and Huascar Medina.

=== Kentucky ===
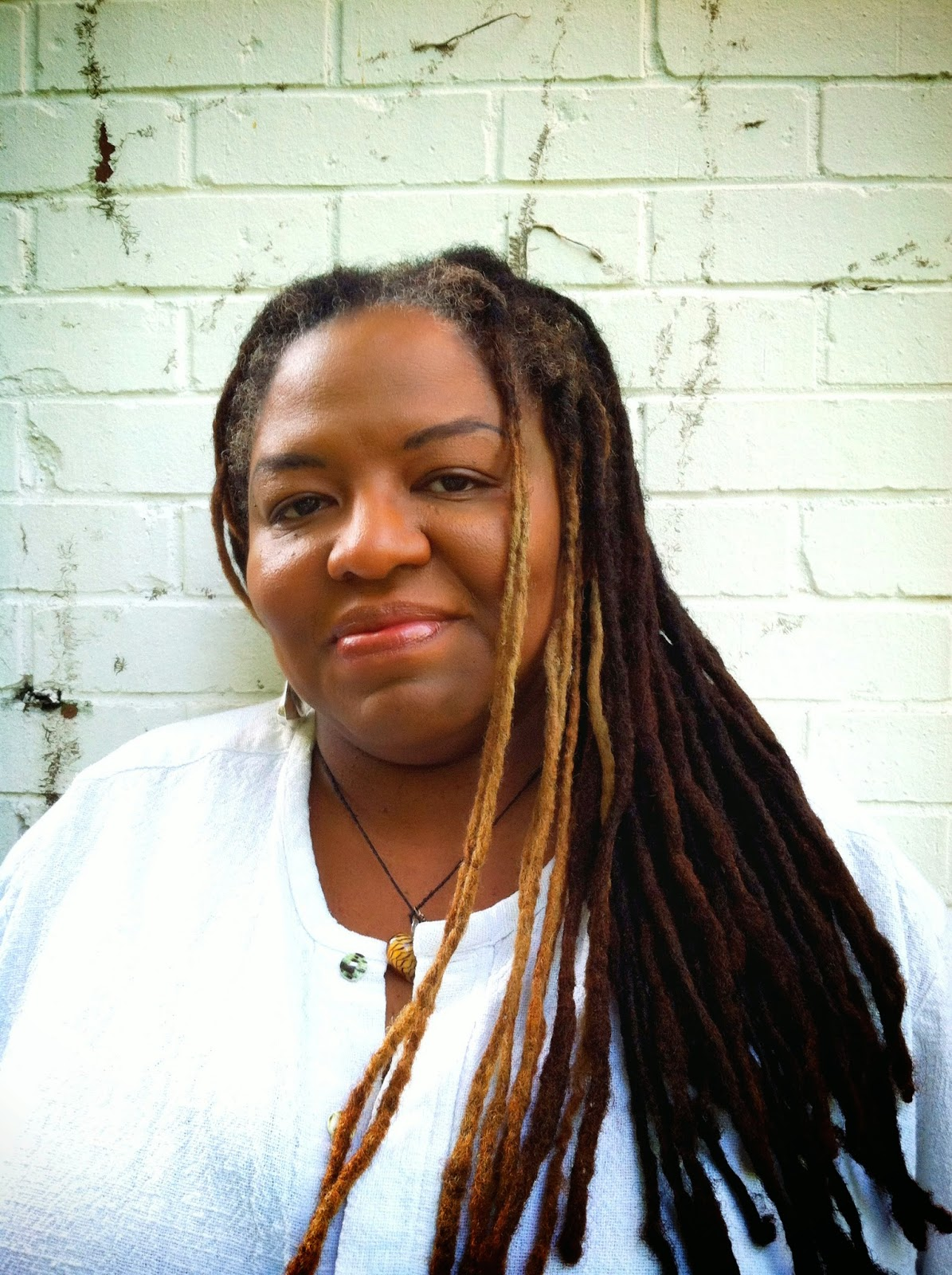
Crystal Wilkinson, Poet Laureate of Kentucky

From the creation of the poet laureate position in 1926 until 1990, the state legislature appointed poets to lifetime terms as poets laureate. Several poets held the position at the same time. Since 1990, Kentucky state law provides for the appointment of a poet laureate or writer laureate to one two-year term selected by the governor. The statute, Kentucky Revised Statutes Section 153.600 provides for two duties: (1) "Make a presentation on Kentucky Writers' Day" and (2) "Act as a writing consultant to the State Department of Education and Kentucky Department for Libraries and Archives". The position comes without salary, although the laureate "may be reimbursed for expenses". According to the Kentucky Arts Council, the Kentucky poet laureate is charged with "promoting the literary arts and leading the state in literary activities, including Kentucky Writers' Day"—a holiday held on 24 April "to commemorate the birthday of Kentuckian Robert Penn Warren, the first poet laureate of the United States". The poet laureate is inducted on this date at the Writers' Day festivities every other year.

=== Louisiana ===
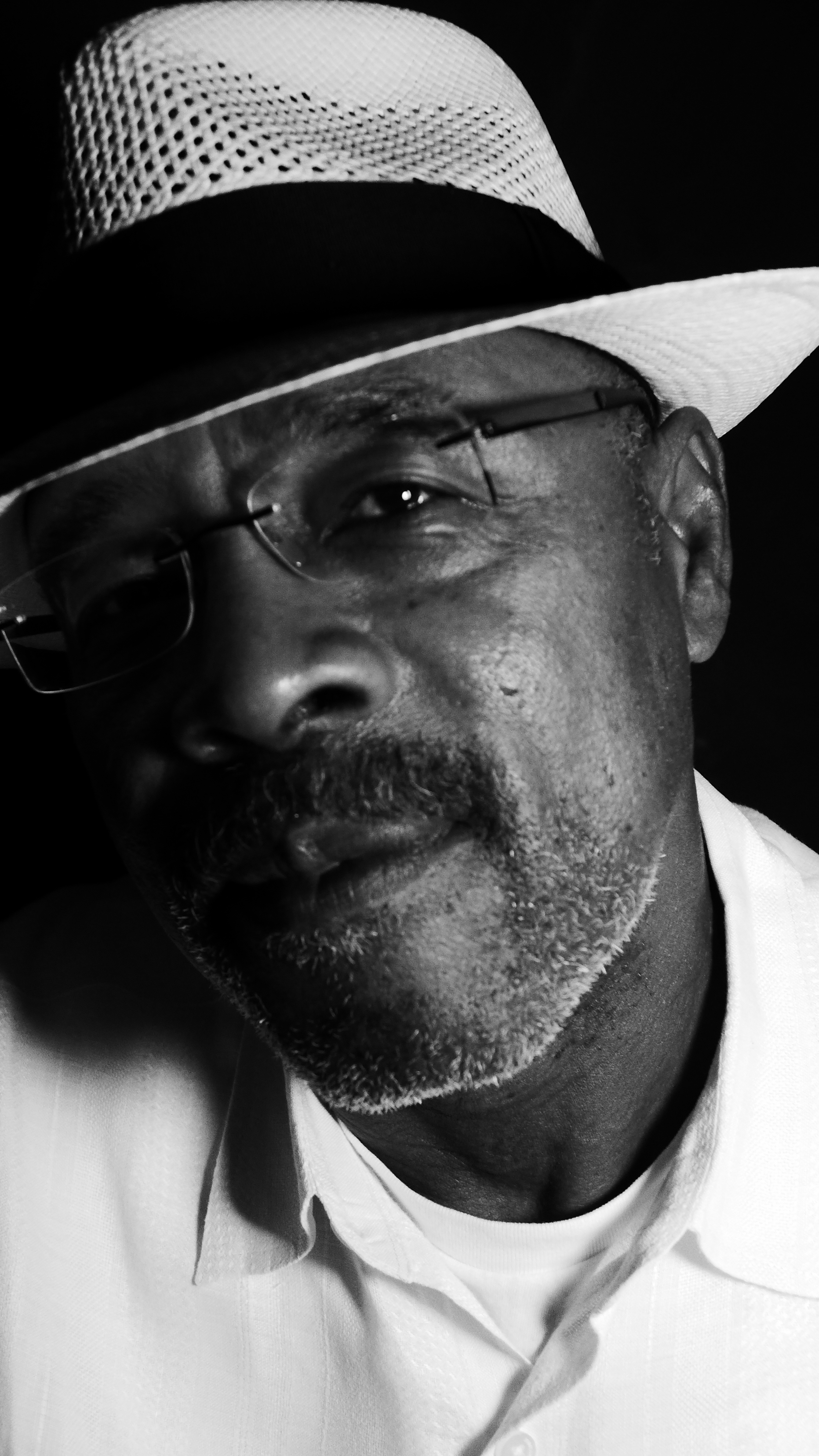
John Warner Smith, Poet Laureate of Louisiana

The current poet laureate of Louisiana is Alison Pelegrin, who was appointed in 2023. Predecessors include Ava Leavell Haymon, Julie Kane, Peter Cooley, John Warner Smith and Mona Lisa Saloy.

=== Maine ===
Kate Barnes served as Maine's first poet laureate from 1996 to 1999. The current poet laureate of Maine is Julia Bouwsna. Predecessors include Wesley McNair, Baron Wormser, and Betsy Sholl.

=== Maryland ===
The current poet laureate of Maryland is Grace Cavalieri, appointed in 2018.

==== Cities ====
- The city of Takoma Park Poet Laureate program, established in 2005, honors the achievements of a local poet, encouraging a wider appreciation of poetry and literature. Kathleen O'Toole currently holds the office. Poet Laureate emeritus include Donald Berger (2005–2007), Anne Becker (2007–2011), and Merrill Leffler (2011–2018).

=== Massachusetts ===
In 2025, Governor Maura Healey signed an executive order to create the first-ever poet laureate position for Massachusetts. In May 2025 at the Peabody Essex Museum in Salem, Governor Maura Healey and Lieutenant Governor Kim Driscoll announced that Regie Gibson has been selected to serve as Massachusetts Inaugural Poet Laureate.

Many cities in Massachusetts have appointed poets laureate.

==== Cities ====
- Miriam Levine was appointed the first poet laureate of Arlington in 2015
- Sam Cornish was appointed the first Boston poet laureate in 2008, succeeded in 2015 by Danielle Legros Georges. The current Poet Laureate of Boston is Porsha Olayiwola.
- Martin Espada was the first poet laureate of Northampton in 2003. Successors include Janet Aalfs and Patrick Donnelly.
- Stephan Delbos was appointed the first poet laureate of Plymouth in 2020.
- Everett Hoagland was appointed the first Poet Laureate of the City of New Bedford. Successors have included John Landry and Patricia Gomes. Sarah Jane Mulvey is the current Poet Laureate of the City of New Bedford.

=== Michigan ===
Edgar A. Guest served as Michigan Poet Laureate from 1952 through 1959 having been appointed Poet Laureate through Senate Concurrent Resolution No. 38 (1952) of the Michigan Legislature. State lawmakers made three separate unsuccessful attempts to reinstate a poet laureate position in 2000, 2005, and 2019. The current poet laureate of Michigan is Nandi Comer, appointed in 2023.

=== Minnesota ===
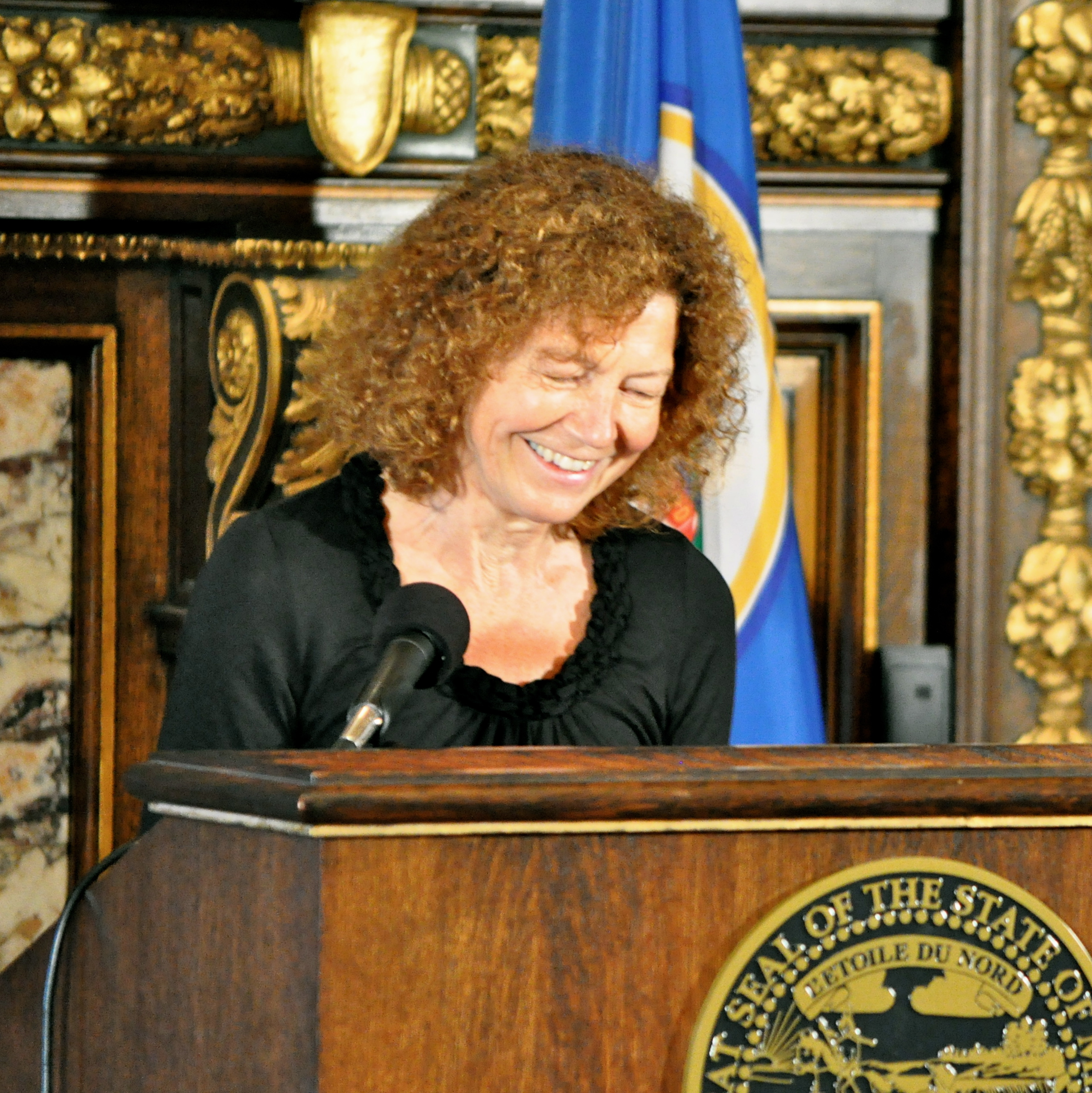
Joyce Sutphen Minnesota Poet Laureate

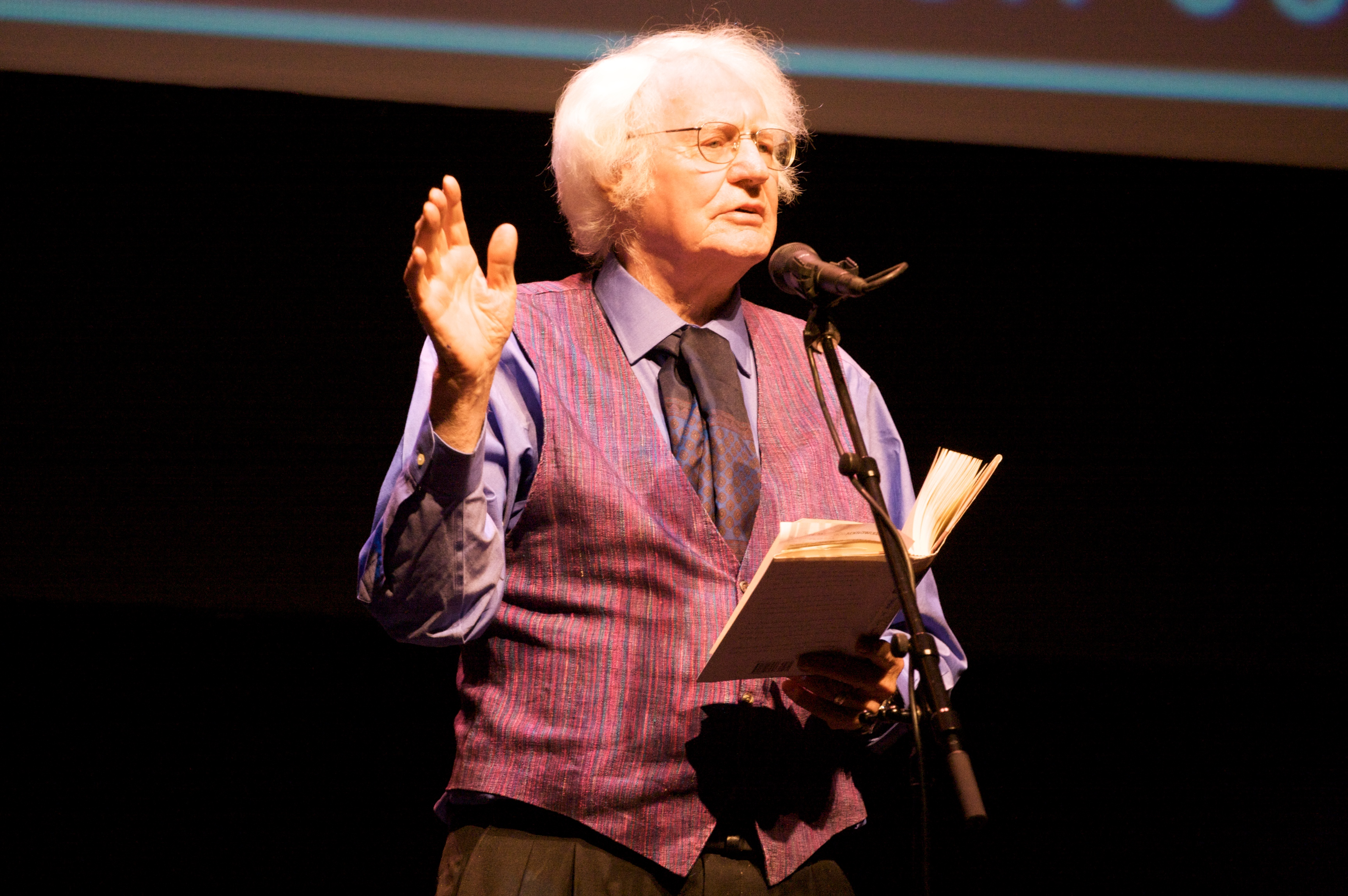
Robert Bly was the first poet laureate of Minnesota

In May 2007, Gov. Pawlenty reversed his opposition and signed Section 4, Chapter 148 of the Minnesota Session Laws 2007, establishing the state poet laureate. Robert Bly was appointed the first Minnesota poet laureate on February 27, 2008, succeeded on August 23, 2011, by Joyce Sutphen. Dr. Gwen Westerman was appointed as the third Minnesota poet laureate on September 9, 2021, by Governor Tim Walz.

=== Mississippi ===
In 1963, Governor Ross Barnett appointed Mississippi's first Poet Laureate, Maude Willard Leet Prenshaw. In 1973, Louise Moss Montgomery was named laureate by Gov. William Waller. Gov. Cliff Finch appointed Winifred Hamrick Farrar laureate in 1978. All three poets laureate served lifetime terms. Beginning in 2012, Mississippi poets laureate now serve four-year terms. Natasha Tretheway served as the Poet Laureate of Mississippi from 2012 to 2016. On August 10, 2016, Beth Ann Fennelly assumed the position. The current poet laureate of Mississippi is Ann Fisher-Wirth.

=== Missouri ===
Missouri's poet laureate was established by an executive order from the governor. The order outlined a post with a two-year term, to be filled by "a published poet, a resident of Missouri, be active in the poetry community, and be willing and able to promote poetry in the state of Missouri". The order requires that the appointee "promote the arts in Missouri by making public appearances at public libraries and schools across the state" and "compose an original poem in honor of Missouri" Missouri's poet laureate serves without compensation. St Louis' current poet laureate is Pacia Elaine Anderson, appointed April 21, 2025.

- Walter Bargen
- David Clewell
- William Trowbridge
- Aliki Barnstone
- Karen Craigo
- Maryfrances Wagner
- David L. Harrison
- Justin Hamm

=== Montana ===
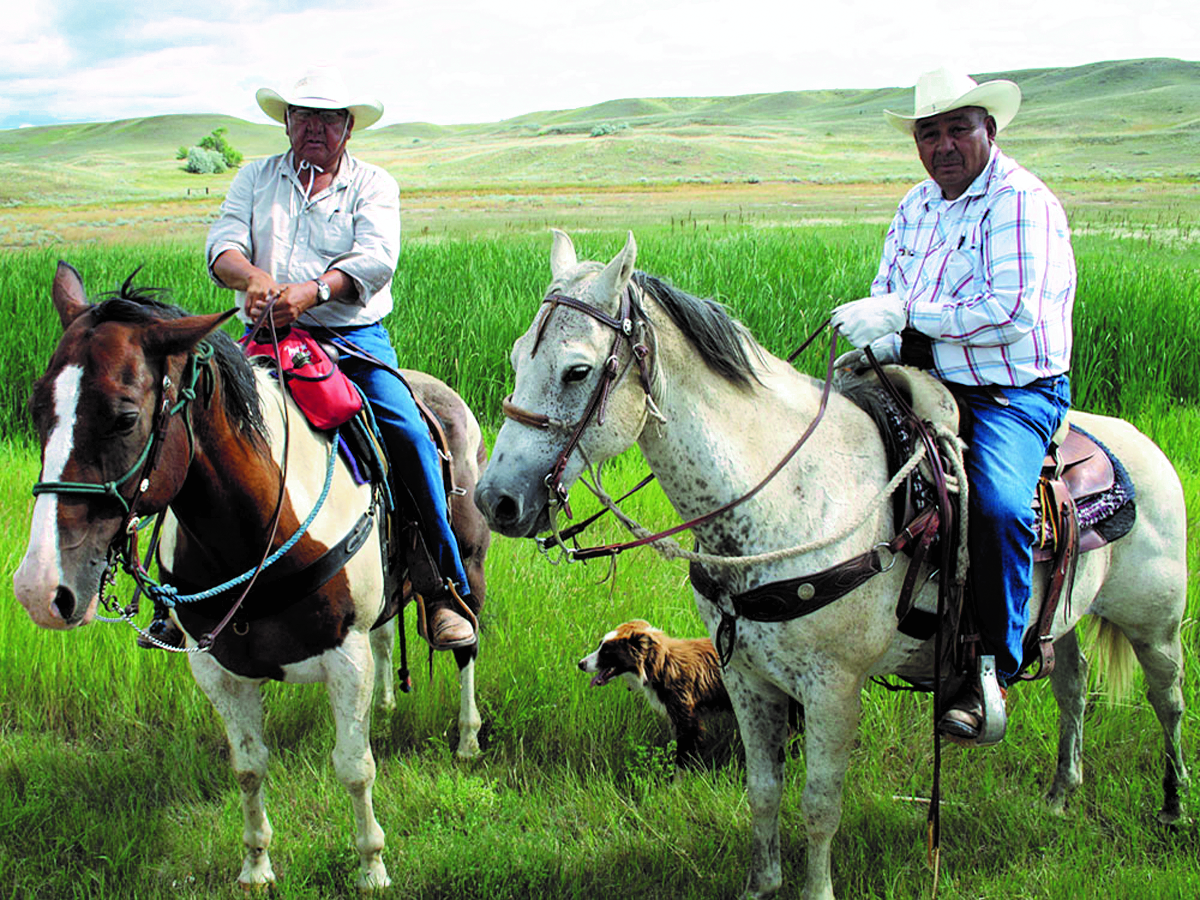
Henry Real Bird on horseback

Sandra Alcosser was Montana's first poet laureate, serving in the position from 2005 to 2007. The current poet laureate of Montana is Chris La Tray, appointed in 2023. Predecessors include Sheryl Noethe, Henry Real Bird, and Mark Gibbons.

=== Nebraska ===
John Neihardt, who was appointed Nebraska poet laureate in 1921, retains the title of Poet Laureate of Nebraska "in perpetuity". He served until his death on November 3, 1973. Four subsequent official poets have been given the title Nebraska State Poet:

- William Kloefkorn
- Twyla Hansen
- Matt Mason
- **Jewel Rodgers**

=== Nevada ===
Mildred Breedlove (1904–1994) served as the first poet laureate of Nevada from 1957 to 2007. During her tenure, Breedlove disputed with officials over a commissioned work. Norman Kaye, a songwriter, was appointed in the 1960s although he had (and has) not published any poetry. He was named "laureate emeritus" in 2007 but no replacement was announced.

=== New Hampshire ===
Paul Scott Mowrer was appointed as New Hampshire's first poet laureate, and served from 1968 to 1971. The current poet laureate of New Hampshire is Jennifer Militello, appointed in 2024. Predecessors include W. E. Butts, Richard Eberhart, Patricia Fargnoli, Cynthia Huntington, and Jane Kenyon.

=== New Jersey ===
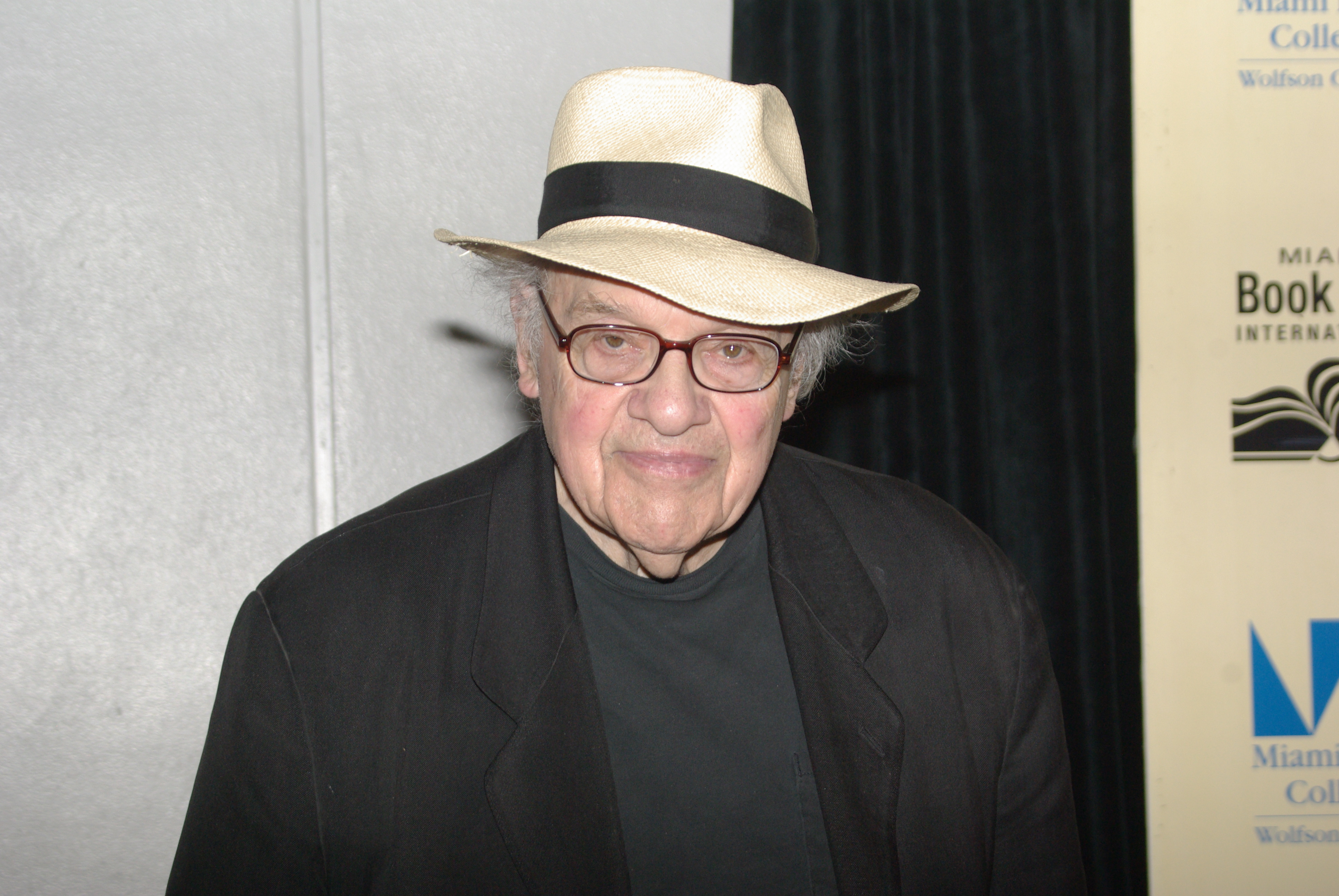
Gerald Stern, shown here in 2011, was New Jersey's first poet laureate.

New Jersey no longer has a poet laureate position. It existed for less than four years and was abolished by the legislature effective 2 July 2003.

The state legislature created in 1999 the post as part of a biennial award called the New Jersey William Carlos Williams Citation of Merit. The 1999 act, codified as N.J.S.A. 52:16A-26.9, provided for a panel of four poets from New Jersey selected by the New Jersey State Council on the Arts the New Jersey Council for the Humanities would convene to select candidates for the position for the consideration of the state's governor. An incumbent poet laureate would be the fifth member of the panel that selected his successor. The governor alone would appoint the poet laureate by presenting him or her with the New Jersey William Carlos Williams Citation of Merit. The poet laureate, serving for a two-year term, was expected to "engage in activities to promote and encourage poetry within the State" and "give no fewer than two public readings within the State each year".

The state legislature and governor abolished the post after the second poet laureate, Amiri Baraka incited a public controversy soon after his appointment with a public reading of his poem "Somebody Blew Up America" The poem was controversial and met with harsh criticism by literary critics, politicians, and the public. The poem was highly critical of racism in America, includes angry depictions of public figures, claimed Israel was involved in the World Trade Center attacks, and supported the theory that the United States government knew about the 9/11 attacks in advance. Critics accused Baraka of racism and anti-Semitism. Baraka refused to resign, and because the statute did not allow the governor to remove him from the post, the state legislature and governor enacted legislation to abolish the position on 2 July 2003.

=== New Mexico ===
The current New Mexico Poet Laureate is Lauren Camp (2023–2025). Her predecessor was New Mexico's first poet laureate, Levi Romero in 2020.

=== New York ===
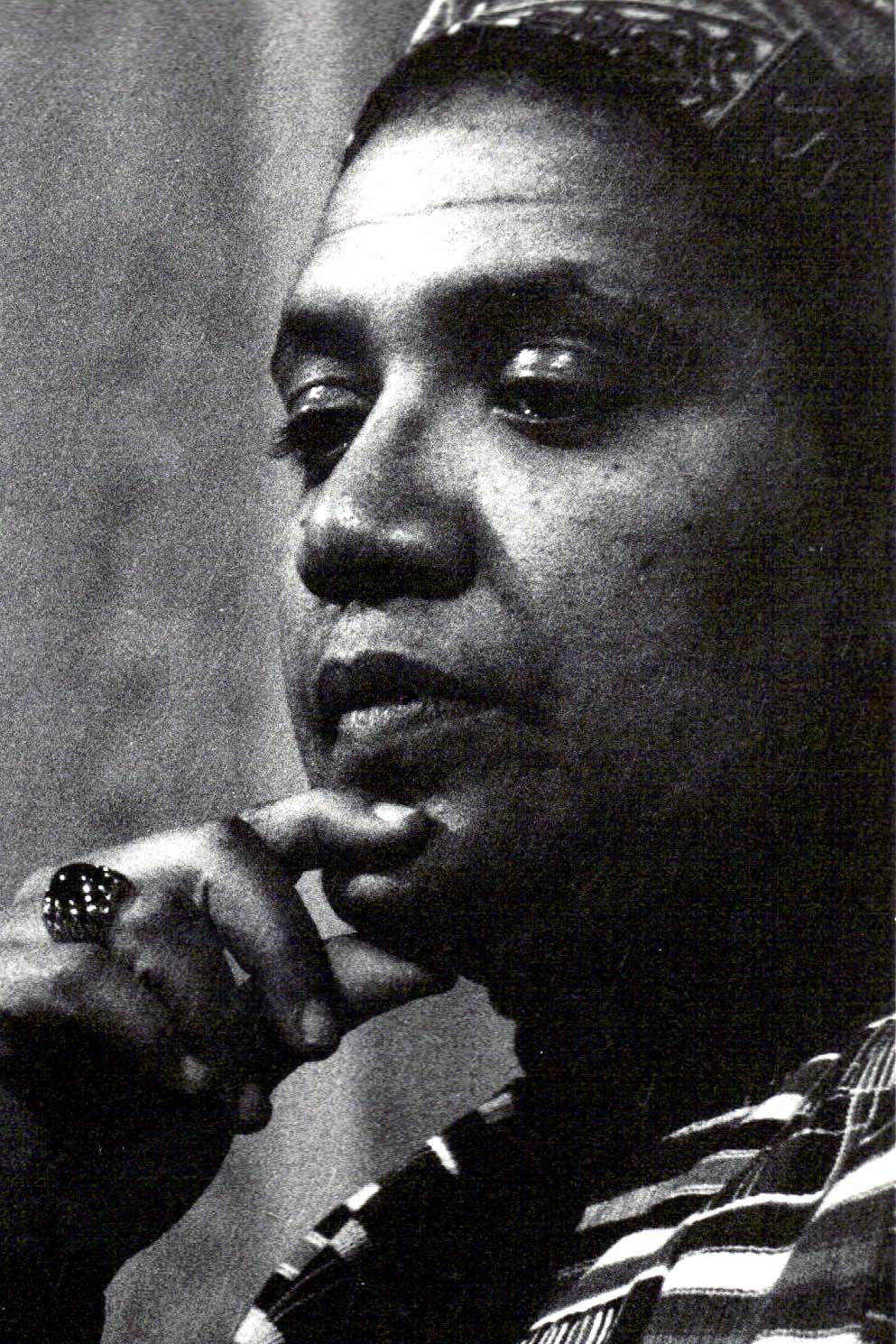
Audre Lorde was the third poet laureate of New York.

The position of New York State Poet Laureate (official title: State Poet) was established by a special mandate of the New York State Legislature on August 1, 1985. Willie Perdomo is the current New York state poet laureate. In 1988, New York also established position for other genres of writing entitled New York State Author. In 2004, Ishle Yi Park became first female and the first Korean American poet laureate of the New York City borough of Queens. In 2016, Governor Cuomo also named Joseph Tusiani Poet Laureate Emeritus.

=== North Carolina ===
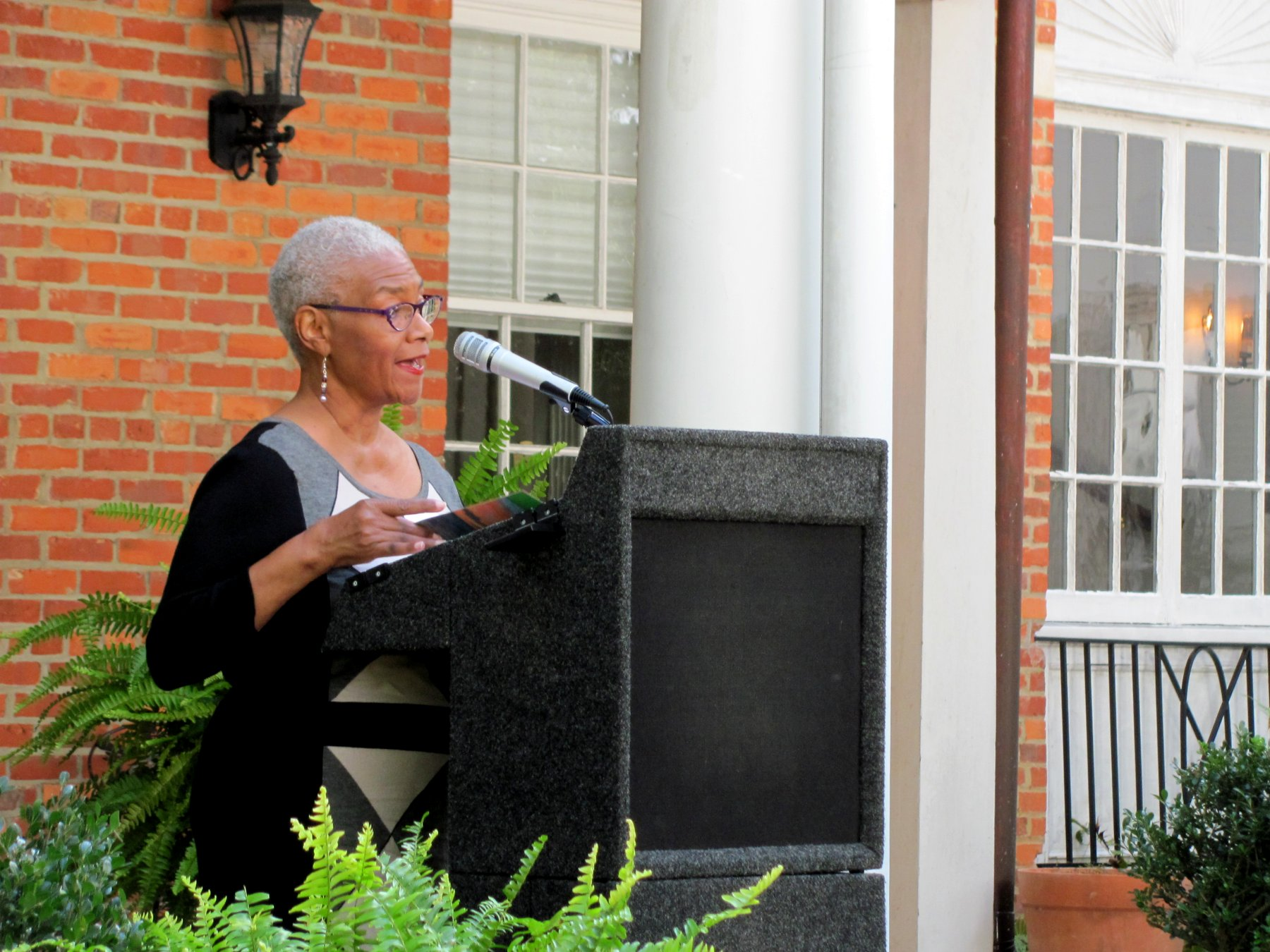
Jaki Shelton Green, Poet Laureate of North Carolina

The 1935 General Assembly created the office of state poet laureate and empowers the Governor to appoint a North Carolina Poet Laureate. Jaki Shelton Green has been North Carolina's Poet Laureate since 2018.

==== Cities ====
- Carrboro, North Carolina named Liza Wolff-Francis as its eighth poet laureate in 2022.
- Charlotte, North Carolina chose Jay Ward as its first poet laureate in 2022. The City also named their first youth poet laureate, Vanessa Hunter, in 2024.
- The city of Durham, North Carolina, selected DJ Rogers as its first poet laureate in 2022.
- Greensboro, North Carolina began its poet laureate program in 2024 naming Josephus Thompson III as the first to hold the position.

=== North Dakota ===
Corbin A. Waldron was the first poet laureate of North Dakota from 1957 to 1978. The position was later occupied by Larry Woiwode, who was appointed in 1995 and served until his death in 2022. The current poet laureate of North Dakota is Dr. Denise Lajimodiere.

=== Ohio ===
In 2014, Ohio enacted law creating the position of Ohio poet laureate starting July 1, 2016. The Ohio Arts Council provides a list of candidates to the governor for selection to serve a two-year term, with the possibility of reappointment. Dr. Amit Majmudar of Dublin, Ohio, was named the first state Poet Laureate by Gov. John Kasich, for a two-year term beginning January 1, 2016. Edward A. Julian, Sr., is the current Poet Laureate of Ohio.

=== Oklahoma ===
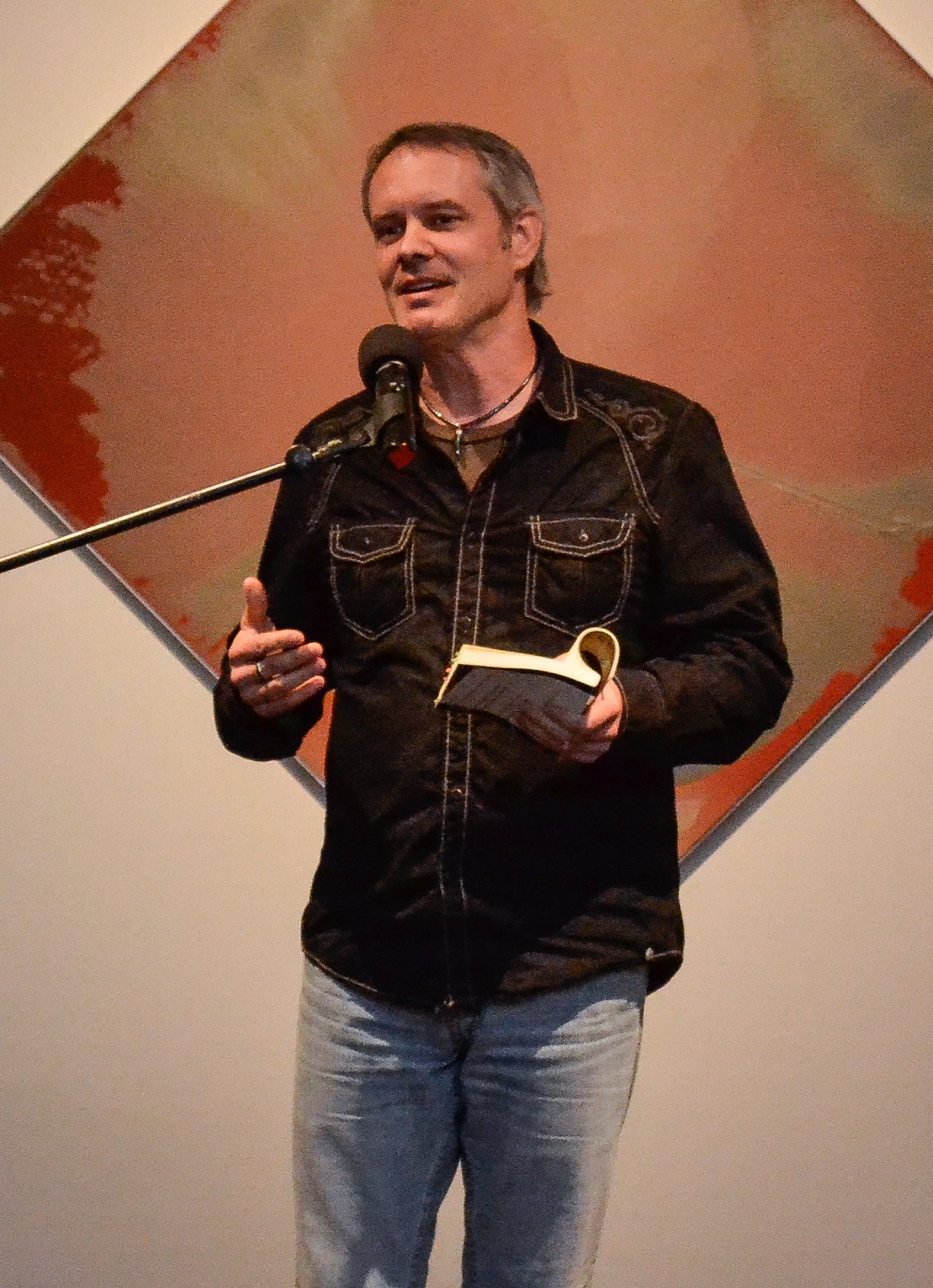
Nathan Brown, Poet Laureate of Oklahoma, 2013

Oklahoma has appointed poets laureate since 1923. The state of Oklahoma named Violet McDougal its first poet laureate in 1923. Joe Kreger who first served from 1998 to 2001 was appointed a second term as Oklahoma's poet laureate from 2021 to 2022. The current poet laureate of Oklahoma is Jay Snider.

==== Cities ====
- Norman, Oklahoma, selected its first poet laureate, Dr. Julie Ann Ward, in April 2022. Norman is the first city in Oklahoma to have its own poet laureate.

=== Oregon ===
The position of Oregon Poet Laureate was established in 1923, appointing Edwin Markham as the first poet laureate. Anis Mojgani was appointed to the position in 2020 by Governor Kate Brown.

=== Pennsylvania ===
Florence Van Leer Earle Coates was elected poet laureate of Pennsylvania by the state Federation of Women's Clubs in 1915. Pennsylvania appointed one poet, Samuel John Hazo, in 1993. He held the position for ten years before it was eliminated by Governor Bob Casey.

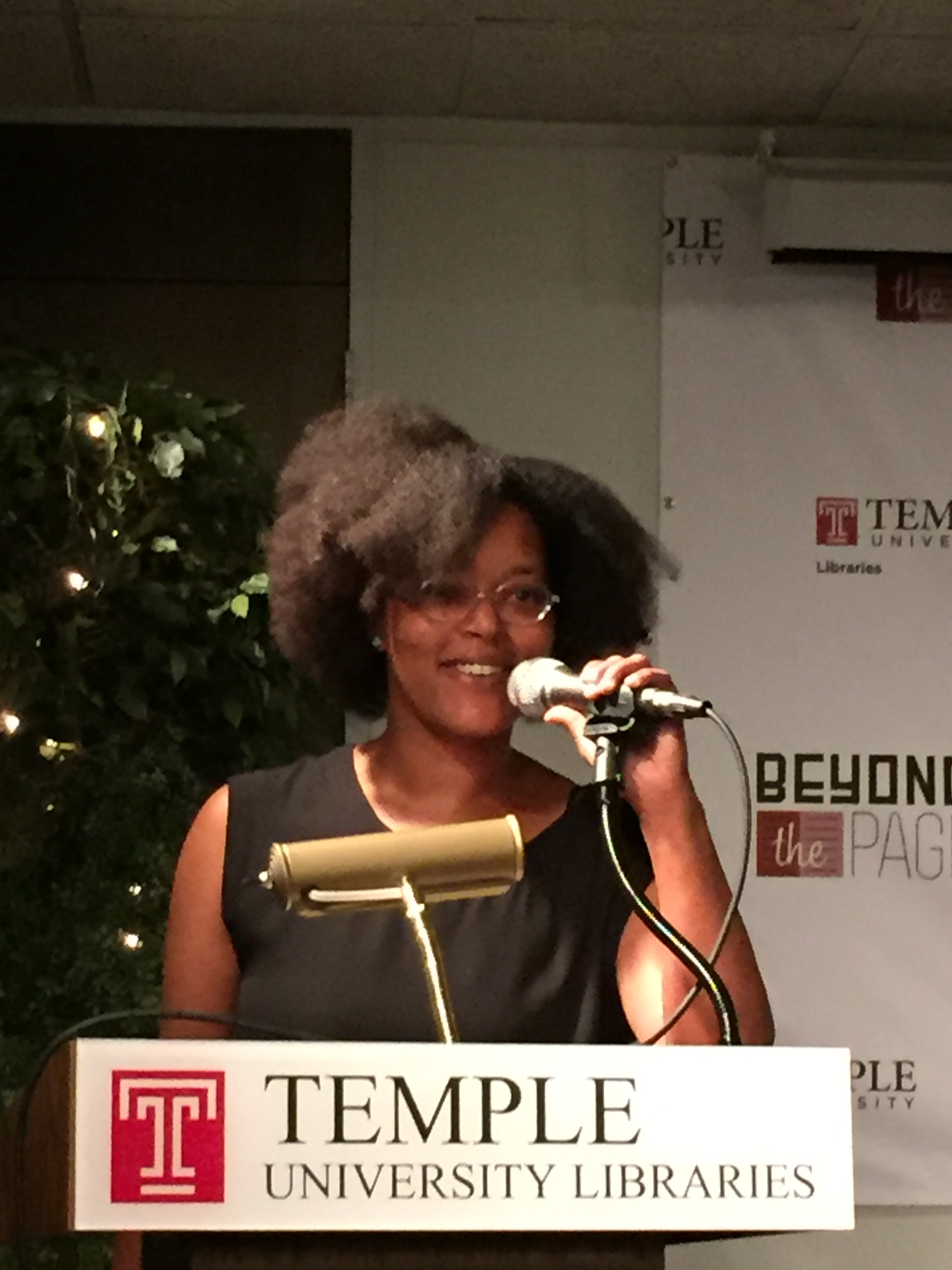
Yolanda Wisher Poet Laureate of Philadelphia

==== Counties ====
- Bucks County named Nicole Steinberg first poet laureate in 2021.
- Lancaster County's Lancaster Literary Guild named Barbara Buckman Strasko the first poet laureate of the county.
- Allegheny County's City of Asylum named Celeste Gainey in 2020 and Doralee Brooks in 2022.

==== Cities ====
- Harrisburg named Rick Kearns poet laureate in 2014.
- Philadelphia named Airea D. Matthews poet laureate of the city in 2022. Her predecessors include Trapeta Mayson, Roque Salas Rivera, Sonia Sanchez, Frank Sherlock, and Yolanda Wisher

=== Rhode Island ===
The State Poet of Rhode Island, established in 1987, is codified in Chapter 42-100 of the State of Rhode Island General Laws. The five-year appointment by the Governor carries an annual salary of $1,000.

=== South Carolina ===
Archibald Rutledge was the first poet laureate of South Carolina, serving from 1934 to 1973. The sixth poet laureate of South Carolina, generally a lifetime position, is Marjory Heath Wentworth was appointed in 2003 by Governor Mark Sanford pursuant to SC Code, Sec. 1-3-230 She resigned in 2020.

=== South Dakota ===
The first poet laureate was appointed in 1937, and a permanent office of poet laureate of South Dakota was created by legislation in 1959. The Governor has the authority to appoint a candidate who has received a recommendation from the South Dakota State Poetry Society. The appointment was indefinite, "during the pleasure of the Governor", until 2015, when the term was set at four years. Past appointees have lifetime emeritus status. The current poet laureate is Bruce Roseland. "It's an honor to stand among those who have come before me," Roseland said. "There are many people in South Dakota who write as well as I do and most of them write better. To represent South Dakota in this form of writing poetry … I'm very happy about it. I hope to be an ambassador."

=== Tennessee ===
"Pek" Gunn, a native of Bold Spring, Tennessee, and a close friend and politically ally of former Governor of Tennessee Frank Clement, was the first Tennessean given the title of State Poet Laureate by the 87th Tennessee General Assembly in the 1971–1972 session. He died in 1995.Margaret Britton Vaughn is the current Poet Laureate, she is serving her lifetime appointment since 1999. The current poet laureate of Tennessee is Margaret Britton Vaughn was appointed in 1999.

=== Texas ===
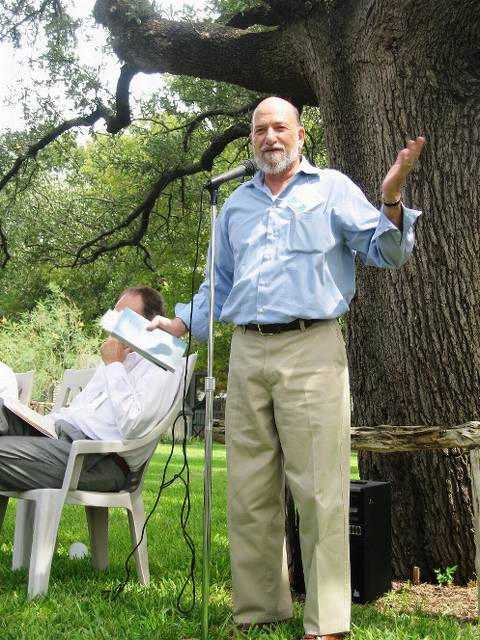
Jack Elliott Myers was poet laureate of Texas in 2003

The state of Texas established a Poet Laureate in 1932 (historical list of Texas poets laureate). The term as of 2016 is one year. The current poet laureate of Texas is Amanda Johnston, appointed in 2023.

==== Cities ====
- In April 2012, San Antonio became the first Texas city to appoint a Poet Laureate, Carmen Tafolla. The San Antonio Poet Laureate serves a two-year term. Laurie Ann Guerrero was appointed on April 1, 2014.

=== Utah ===
The Utah State Poet Laureate Program was established in 1997. As a joint project of the Governor's Office and the Utah Arts Council Literature Program, the Governor appoints the Utah Poet Laureate for a five-year term.

=== Vermont ===
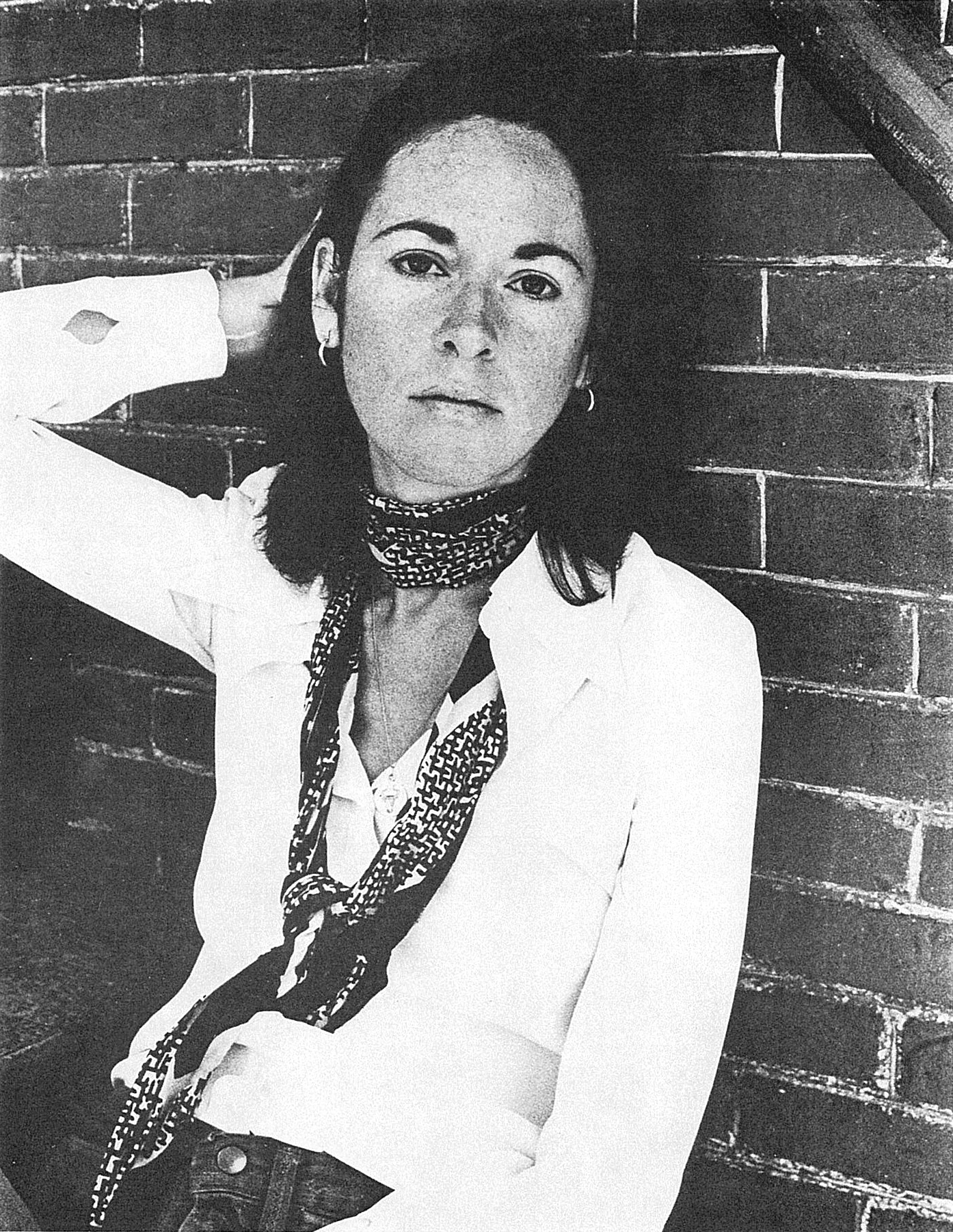
Louise Glück, Poet Laureate of Vermont

Robert Frost was the first poet named as Laureate by Joint House Resolution 54 of the Vermont General Assembly in 1961, less than two years before his death. The current position of State Poet, a four-year appointment, was created by Executive Order 69 in 1988. In 2007, the designation was changed to Poet Laureate.

=== Virginia ===
The Commonwealth of Virginia has appointed a Poet Laureate since December 18, 1936. The first was Carter Warner Wormeley, appointed for life. Appointments from 1942 until 1992 were for one year, with many reappointed for multiple terms. In 1992, the term was increased to two years. Since 1998 appointments are made from list of nominees presented by the Poetry Society of Virginia, established at the College of William & Mary in Williamsburg, Virginia, in 1923. The current Poet Laureate is Mattie Quesenberry Smith.

=== Washington ===
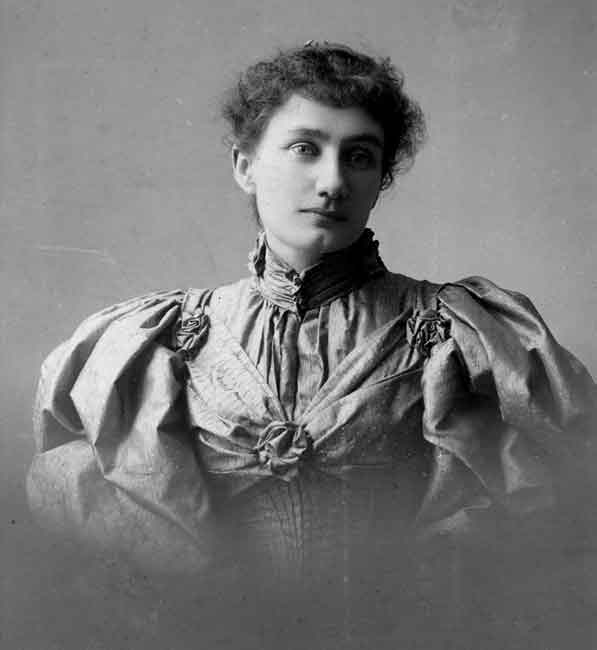
Ella Rhoads Higginson, Washington State Federation of Women's Clubs named her poet laureate in 1931.

Poets Laureate of Washington are appointed for a two-year term by the Governor of Washington. Although the Washington State Federation of Women's Clubs named Ella Higginson poet laureate in 1931, there was no official position until House Bill 1279 was signed into law in 2007. Samuel Green was named as Washington's first official Poet Laureate in 2007, and served until 2009. The position was unfilled for two years due to a budget shortfall, and resumed without state funding.

Since 2023, the Poet Laureate of Washington has been Arianne True, a Choctaw and Chickasaw writer and artist from Tacoma. She is the second Indigenous person to hold the post, following her predecessor Rena Priest of the Lummi Nation.

=== West Virginia ===
West Virginia established the position of Poet Laureate by statute in 1927. The appointment was defined by statue as "at the pleasure of the Governor", but has become an indefinitely renewable two-year term.

=== Wisconsin ===
The position and nominating commission was created by executive order from Governor Tommy Thompson on July 31, 2000. On February 4, 2011, Governor Scott Walker discontinued state sponsorship and sent a letter to the members of the Wisconsin Poet Laureate Commission to inform them the position had been terminated. The Wisconsin Academy of Sciences, Arts & Letters assumed the role of the commission in May of that year.

=== Wyoming ===
The position of Poet Laureate was created by executive order in 1981 with a variable term of service. The post became a customary two-year term starting on statehood day (July 10). The current poet laureate of Wyoming is Eugene M. Gagliano appointed in 2016 and reappointed in 2018.

== Territories ==
=== American Samoa ===
John Enright was identified by Samoa News as the Poet Laureate of American Samoa.

=== Guam ===
In 1986, Frederick B. Quinene was named the Poet Laureate of Guam.

=== Puerto Rico ===
Poets Laureate of Puerto Rico include Juan Antonio Corretjer and Diana Ramírez de Arellano (1958).

=== United States Virgin Islands ===
As early as 2003, Richard Schrader, Sr. has been identified as the Poet Laureate of the U.S. Virgin Islands.
