= Poet Laureate of Montana =

American poet, member of the Crow Nation

- Incumbent; Mark Gibbons since 2021
- Type: Poet laureate
- Formation: 2005
- First holder: Sandra Alcosser

The poet laureate of Montana is the poet laureate for the U.S. state of Montana. Montana Governor Brian Schweitzer signed Senate Bill 69 into law in 2005, creating the position.

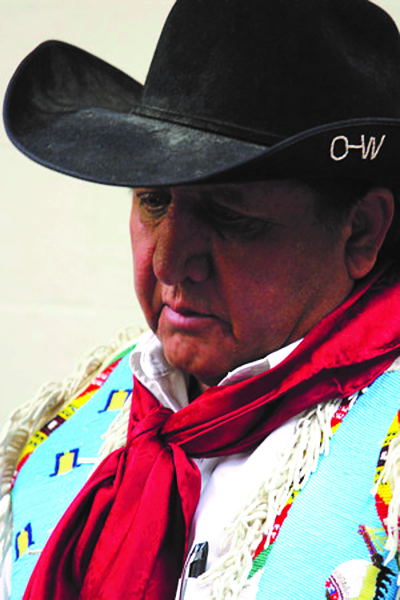
Henry Real Bird was poet laureate in 2009

== List of poets laureate ==
The following have held the position:

- Sandra Alcosser (2005-2007)
- Greg Pape (2007-2009)
- Henry Real Bird (2009-2011)
- Sheryl Noethe (2011-2013)
- Tami Haaland (2013-2015)
- Michael Earl Craig (2015-2017)
- Lowell Jaeger (2017-2019)
- Melissa Kwasny and M.L. Smoker (2019-2021)
- Mark Gibbons (2021–2023)
- Chris La Tray (2023–2024)

== See also ==
- Poet laureate
- List of U.S. state poets laureate
- United States Poet Laureate
