= Poet Laureate of Delaware =

The poet laureate of Delaware is the poet laureate for the U.S. state of Delaware. Poets are appointed to the position by the governor. Nnamdi Chukwuocha and Albert Mills—twin brothers who are known as the "Twin Poets"—were appointed 17th poets laureate of the state of Delaware on December 13, 2015. According to the Library of Congress, they are the first co-laureates appointed by a state and the first siblings to share the position.

== List of poets laureate ==
#	Poet laureate	Term	Appointed by	Notes
1	Edna Deemer Leach	1947–49	Bacon	
2	Jeannette Slocum Edwards	1950–53	Carvel	
3	Frances Shannon Flowers (McNeal)	1954	Boggs	
4	Katherine King Johnson	1955	Boggs	
5	David Hudson	1956–60	Boggs	
6	Alison Kimball Bradford	1961	Buckson	
7	Margaret Eleanor Weaver	1962	Carvel	
8	Mother Aloysius Peach	1963–64	Carvel	
9	Percival R. Roberts III	1965–66	Terry	
10	Joyce Carlson	1967–68	Terry	
11	Antonia Bissell Laird	1969–70	Peterson	
12	Harry Eisenberg	1971	Peterson	
13	David Hudson	1975–76	Tribbitt	
14	e. j. lanyon	1979–81	du Pont	
15	Fleda Brown	2001–07	Minner	
16	JoAnn Balingit	2008–2015	Minner	
17	Nnamdi Chukwuocha; Albert Mills	2015–	Markell	

== See also ==
- List of U.S. state poets laureate
- United States Poet Laureate
