= Poet Laureate of Tennessee =

- Incumbent; Margaret Britton Vaughn since 1995
- Type: Poet Laureate
- Formation: 1971
- First holder: Richard M. "Pek" Gunn

The poet laureate of Tennessee is the official state poet of the U.S. state of Tennessee. The position was established in 1971–1972 by an act of the General Assembly of the state of Tennessee.

== List of poets laureate ==
- Richard M. "Pek" Gunn, 1971/1972–1994
- Margaret Britton Vaughn, 1995–present

== See also ==
- Poet laureate
- List of U.S. state poets laureate
- United States Poet Laureate
