= Poet Laureate of Idaho =

The poet laureate of Idaho or writer in residence is the poet laureate for the U.S. state of Idaho. After 1982 the title was changed to writer in residence.

== List of poets laureate ==
- Irene Welch Grissom (1923–1948)
- Sudie Stuart Hager (1949–1982)

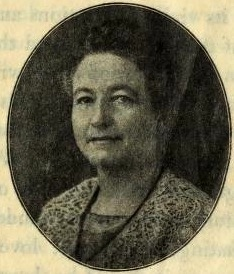
Irene Welch Grissom was the first poet laureate of Idaho

== List of writers in residence ==
- Ron McFarland (1984–1985)
- Robert Wrigley (1986–1987)
- Eberle Umbach (1988–1989)
- Neidy Messer (1990–1991)
- Daryl Jones (1992–1993)
- Clay Morgan (1994–1995)
- Lance Olsen (1996–1998)
- Bill Johnson (1999–2000)
- Jim Irons (2001–2004)
- Kim Barnes (2004–2006)
- Anthony Doerr (2007–2010)
- Brady Udall (2010–2013)
- Diane Raptosh (2013–2016)
- Christian Winn (2016–2019)
- Malia Collins (2019–2021)
- CMarie Fuhrman (2021–2023)
- Kerri Webster (2023– )

== See also ==
- Poet laureate
- List of U.S. state poets laureate
- United States Poet Laureate
