= Poet Laureate of Michigan =

This is a list of poets laureate of Michigan.

Poet Laureate	Term	Notes
Edgar A. Guest	1952–1959	First poet laureate
Nandi Comer	2023–2025	
Dr. Melba Joyce Boyd	2025-present	

== See also ==
- List of U.S. state poets laureate
