= Nnamdi Chukwuocha =

American politician (born 1970)

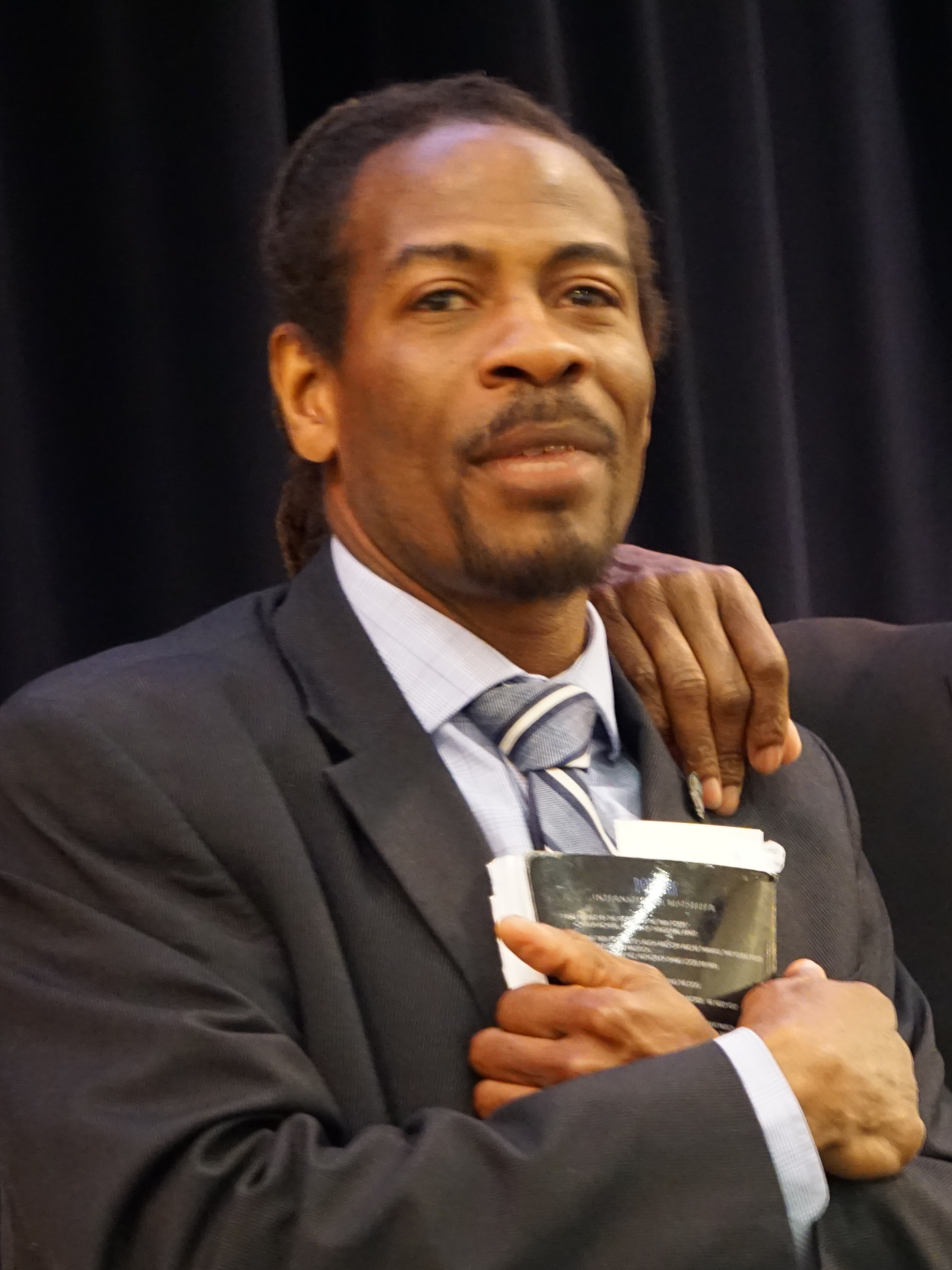
- Chukwuocha in 2018

Member of the Delaware House of Representatives from the 1st district
- Incumbent
- Assumed office November 7, 2018
- Preceded by: Charles Potter Jr.

17th Poet Laureate of Delaware
- Incumbent
- Assumed office December 13, 2015 Serving with Al Mills
- Appointed by: Jack Markell
- Preceded by: JoAnn Balingit

Personal details
- Born: November 16, 1970 (age 55) Wilmington, Delaware, U.S.
- Party: Democratic
- Occupation: Poet, social worker
- Website: Official website Campaign website

Military service
- Branch/service: United States Army

Nnamdi O. Chukwuocha (born November 16, 1970) is an American politician and poet. He is a Democratic member of the Delaware House of Representatives, representing District 1. He is also the current Poet Laureate of Delaware, along with his twin brother, Al Mills.

== Early life and career ==
Chukwuocha was born on November 16, 1970, in Wilmington, Delaware, two minutes before his twin brother, Albert Mills. Their father, William "Hicks" Anderson, was a "legendary" community leader in Wilmington and the city's only community center is named after him. Chukwuocha described his upbringing as a "community-centered family." From an early age, the brothers were interested in writing and poetry. They began writing at age six and were performing together by age seven to children at their grandmother's foster home. A pivotal moment of their lives was when their younger brother died after being struck by a stolen car.

Chukwuocha enlisted in the United States Army and was stationed in Alaska. His brother also served in the Army, in both Iraq and Kuwait during the first Gulf War.

Chukwuocha is a social worker and works as a director at Interfaith Community Housing of Delaware. With his brother, he founded a nonprofit, Art for Life, that seeks to "use the power of the arts to save and transform lives by empowering individuals and communities to create, utilize and support life giving art." He has worked in the nonprofit field for over 30 years.

== Twin Poets ==
I know what my brother is thinking. He knows where I am. I know when to chime in. It’s just a gift. It truly is.

— Al Mills, one half of the "Twin Poets", Delaware Poets Laureate

Chukwuocha and his brother, Al Mills, are known as the "Twin Poets". Both brothers are veterans of the U.S. Army and social workers from Wilmington, Delaware. They have written and performed together since a young age. Their poetry deals with issues such as gun violence, poverty, and the criminal justice system, and is informed by their social work and daily engagement with vulnerable populations in Wilmington.

The brothers work collaboratively in their creative process. They have a strong rapport on-stage, often speak in unison or intermingle their voices, and are able to uniquely punctuate one another with their "rhythmic" spoken poetry. Mills described his brother as writing longer poems.

The Twin Poets have won several awards for their work and appeared on HBO's Def Poetry. They were the subject of a documentary called Why I Write.

=== Delaware Poets Laureate ===
On December 13, 2015, the Twin Poets were named the 17th Poets Laureate of Delaware. As poets laureate, they serve as ambassadors and advocates of poetry for the state. They are the first co-laureates appointed by any state and are the first siblings to share the position. During their swearing-in ceremony, they recited the oath of office in "perfect unison."

== Political career ==
In 2012, Chukwuocha was elected to the Wilmington City Council, where he was elected president pro tempore in 2018. He was appointed to serve on the Wilmington Education Improvement Commission by Jack Markell.

In 2018, he was elected to the Delaware House of Representatives after defeating incumbent Charles Potter Jr. in the Democratic primary race. He represents District 1, which covers the area north of the Brandywine River and west of North Market Street in Wilmington.

In November 2018, Chukwuocha's twin brother was unanimously recommended to be his replacement for his Wilmington City Council seat by a council committee after hours of hearings that were closed to the public. The committee recommendation was voted down by the full council after a contentious debate in late December. A decision on the replacement was pushed forward until February 2019.

== Personal life ==
Chukwuocha is a vegetarian.

== Electoral history ==
- In 2018, Chukwuocha won the Democratic primary with 2,306 votes (59.5%) against incumbent Charles Potter Jr. He was elected unopposed in the general election.
