= List of poets laureate of Louisiana =

The poet laureate of Louisiana is the poet laureate for the U.S. state of Louisiana. Poets laureate are selected by the governor for two years and the Louisiana Endowment for the Humanities manages the program.

== List of poets laureate ==
- Emma Wilson Emery (1942–1970)
- Ethel Green Russell (1970–1973)
- Dr. George William Noel Cooper (1973–1976)
- Henry Thomas Voltz (1976–1980)
- Jean McGivney Boese (1980–1988)
- Pinkie Gordon Lane (1988–1992)
- Sylvia Davison Lott Buckley (1992–1996)
- Jean McGivney Boese (1996–2004)
- Brenda Marie Osbey (2005–2007)
- Darrell Bourque (2007–2008; 2009–2011)
- Julie Kane (2011–2013)
- Ava Leavell Haymon (2013–2015)
- Peter Cooley (2015–2017)
- Jack Bedell (2017–2019)
- John Warner Smith (2019–2021)
- Mona Lisa Saloy (2021–2023)
- Alison Pelegrin (2023–2025)
- Gina Ferrara (2026-present)
