= Ava Leavell Haymon =

American writer

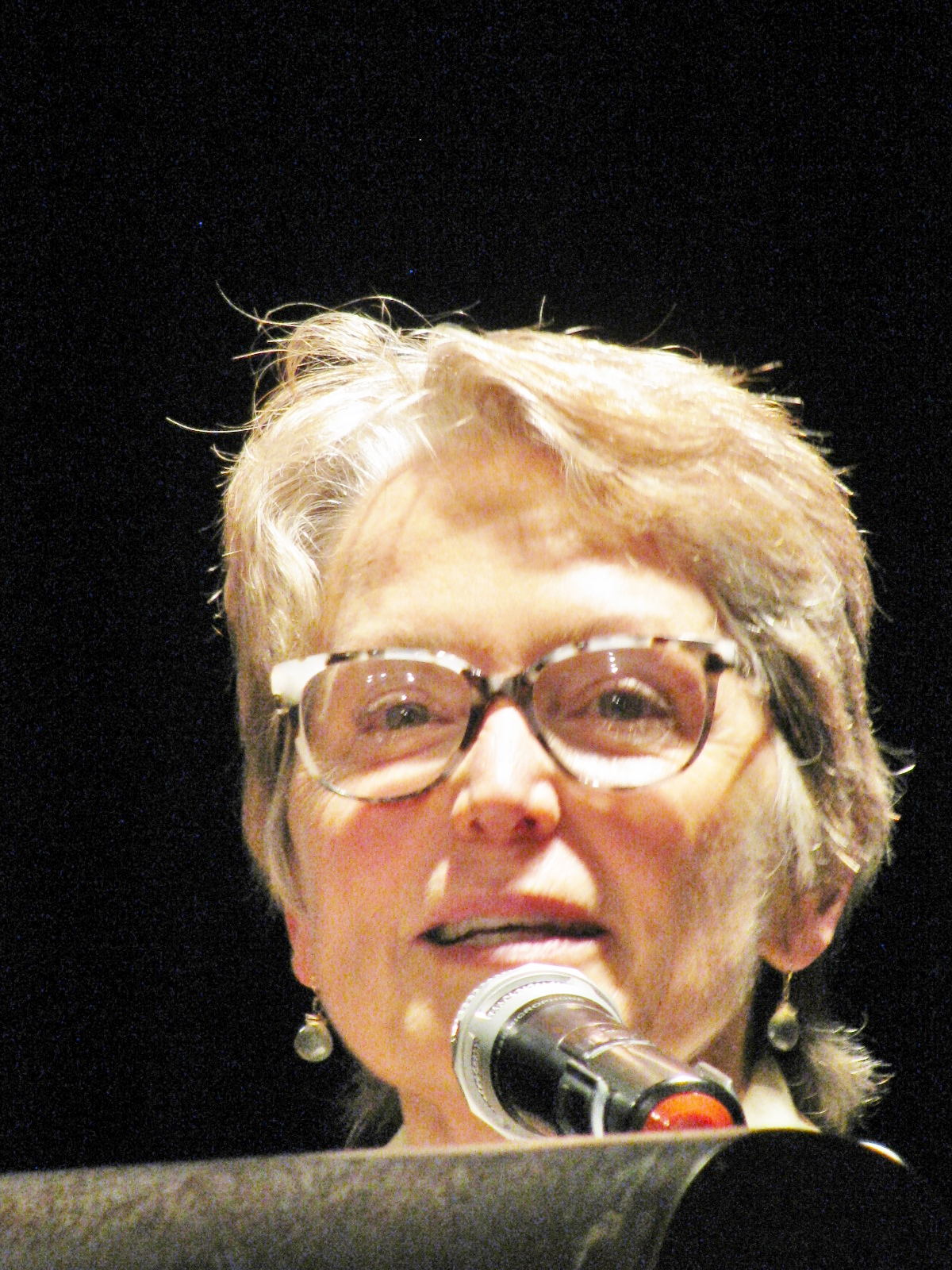
- reading at the Arts Club of Washington, D.C. 2014
- Writing career
- Genre: Poetry
- Notable awards: Poet Laureate of Louisiana
- Website: avahaymon.com

Ava Leavell Haymon was the 2013–2015 Poet Laureate of Louisiana.

== Career ==
She is the author of four collections of poetry, including Eldest Daughter, Why the House Is Made of Gingerbread, Kitchen Heat, and The Strict Economy of Fire, along with five chapbooks.

She is the editor of the forthcoming Louisiana State University Press, Barataria Poetry Series (Spring 2014) and has been awarded the Louisiana Literature Prize for poetry in 2003, the L.E. Phillabaum Poetry Award for 2010, the Mississippi Institute of Arts and Letters 2011 Award in Poetry and has taught as an Artist in the Schools for a number of years.

Her third book, Why The House Was Made Of Gingerbread, was chosen as one of the top ten books of 2010 by Women's Voices for Change.

Ava's work has appeared in Northwest Review, Prairie Schooner, Poetry, and others.

== Selected works ==
=== Books ===
- Eldest Daughter: Poems. LSU Press. 12 August 2013. ISBN 978-0-8071-5339-0.
- Why the House Is Made of Gingerbread: Poems. Louisiana State University Press. 1 March 2010. ISBN 978-0-8071-3757-4.
- Kitchen Heat: Poems. LSU Press. 2006. ISBN 978-0-8071-3172-5.
- The Strict Economy of Fire: Poems. LSU Press. 2004. ISBN 978-0-8071-2994-4.

== Chapbooks ==
- Why the Groundhog Fears Her Shadow. Greensboro, North Carolina: March Street Press, 1996. ISBN 9781882983148
- Built in Fear of Heat. Troy, Maine: Nightshade Press, 1994. ISBN 9781879205451
- Staving Off Rapture. Chico, California: Flume Press, 1994. ISBN 9780961398491
- A Name Gift for Every Child. Baton Rouge: Mother Daybreak Press, 1991.
