= Miriam Levine =

American poet (born 1939)

- Born: 1939 (age 85–86) Paterson, New Jersey, U.S.
- Occupation: Memoirist, poet, novelist
- Education: Boston University (BA, MA); Tufts University (PhD)

Website
- www.miriamlevine.com

Miriam Levine (born 1939) is an American memoirist, poet and novelist. Levine was the first Poet Laureate of Arlington, Massachusetts.

== Biography ==
Levine was born in Paterson, New Jersey, the daughter of Gertrude and Joseph Levine. She spent her early years in Passaic, New Jersey and earned a BA and MA in Comparative Literature from Boston University and a PhD in British Literature from Tufts University.

Levine was a professor at Framingham State University; and, before that, taught at Emerson College, University of Massachusetts Boston, and Northeastern University.

== Awards ==
Levine, winner of the Autumn House Poetry Prize, is a recipient of grants from the National Endowment for the Arts and the Massachusetts Artists Foundation. Awarded a Pushcart Prize, she was a resident fellow at Yaddo; Le Chateau de Lavigny International Writers' Colony, Switzerland; and Millay Colony for the Arts.

== Works ==
- Saving Daylight (2019)
- The Dark Opens (2008)
- In Paterson: a Novel (2002)
- Devotion (1993)
- A Guide to Writers’ Homes in New England (1984)
- The Graves of Delawanna (1981)
- To Know We Are Living (1976)
- Friends Dreaming (1974)
