= Ernest Neal =

American poet (1858–1943)

- Born: 1858; Calhoun, Georgia, U.S.
- Died: January 7, 1943; Atlanta, Georgia, U.S.
- Other names: Earnest Neal
- Education: North Georgia Agricultural College
- Occupations: Poet, educator
- Known for: Poetry

Ernest Neal (1858–1943), was an American poet and educator. He was the 2nd Poet Laureate of Georgia. He lived in Dahlonega for some time, but Calhoun, Georgia was his home.

== Biography ==
He was born in 1858 in Sparta, Georgia, U.S.. He graduated from Warrenton Academy. He earned a degree in 1881 from North Georgia Agricultural College (now the University of North Georgia) at Dahlonega, Georgia.

He taught at Chatsworth Elementary School in Murray County, Georgia. Neal became Georgia's 2nd Poet Laureate on August 20, 1927. He held the position until his death on January 7, 1943.

Neal wrote many poems about the city of Calhoun, and the historic place of New Echota. New Echota was the last standing capital of the Cherokee Indians before they were relocated to Oklahoma (i.e. "The Trail of Tears") from 1838 to 1839; President Andrew Jackson had much to do with this. One of Neal's best known poems,"The Indian's Heart," was recited at the dedication of the New Echota monument near Calhoun.

== Poems ==
"The Land of the Cherokee" Ernest Neal, Poet Laureate of Georgia, Calhoun, Georgia; Poem read at dedication of the New Echota Monument, 1931

== Bibliography ==
- A second book of verse. Macon: J.W. Burke, 1928.
- Yonah, and other poems. Atlanta: Unknown Publisher, 1920.
