= Nandi Comer =

American poet

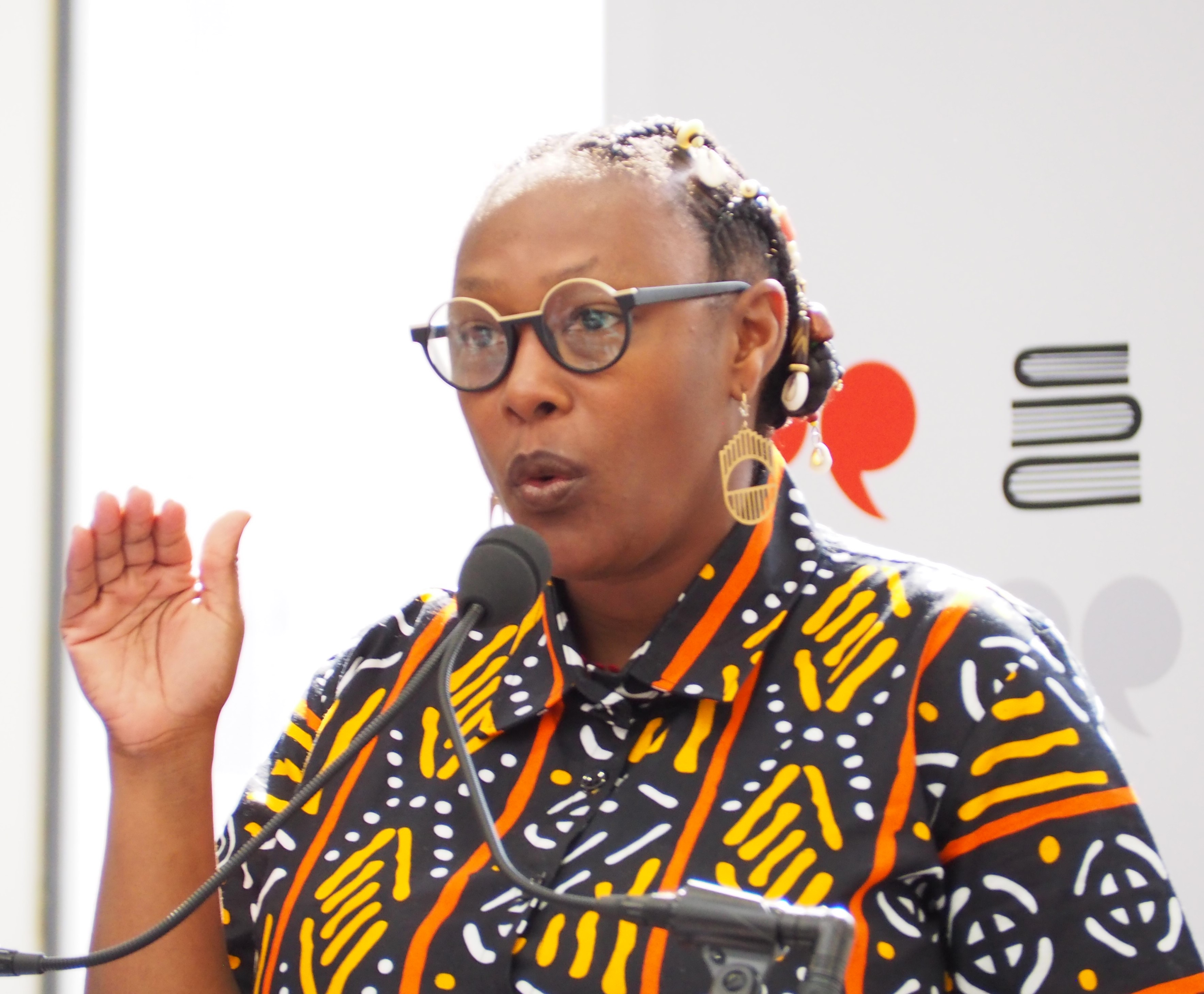
Nandi Comer

Nandi Comer is an American author and poet. She was appointed as the poet laureate of Michigan in 2023, becoming the state's first poet laureate since the 1950s.

== Early life and education ==
Comer was born in 1979. She grew up in Detroit and graduated from the Communication & Media Arts High School. She studied English and Spanish at the University of Michigan, receiving bachelor's degrees in both. She also holds a master’s degree in African American Literature and a Master’s of Fine Arts degree in Poetry from Indiana University.

== Career ==
Comer was appointed as poet laureate of Michigan in 2023. She is the first person to hold that position since Edgar Guest, who died in 1959. In 2021, the Michigan legislature passed a budget re-establishing the position.

== Publications ==
- Comer, Nandi (2020). Tapping Out: Poems. TriQuarterly. ISBN 9780810142091.
- — (2018). American Family: A Syndrome. Finishing Line Press. ISBN 9781635345667.
