= Alison Pelegrin =

American poet and writer

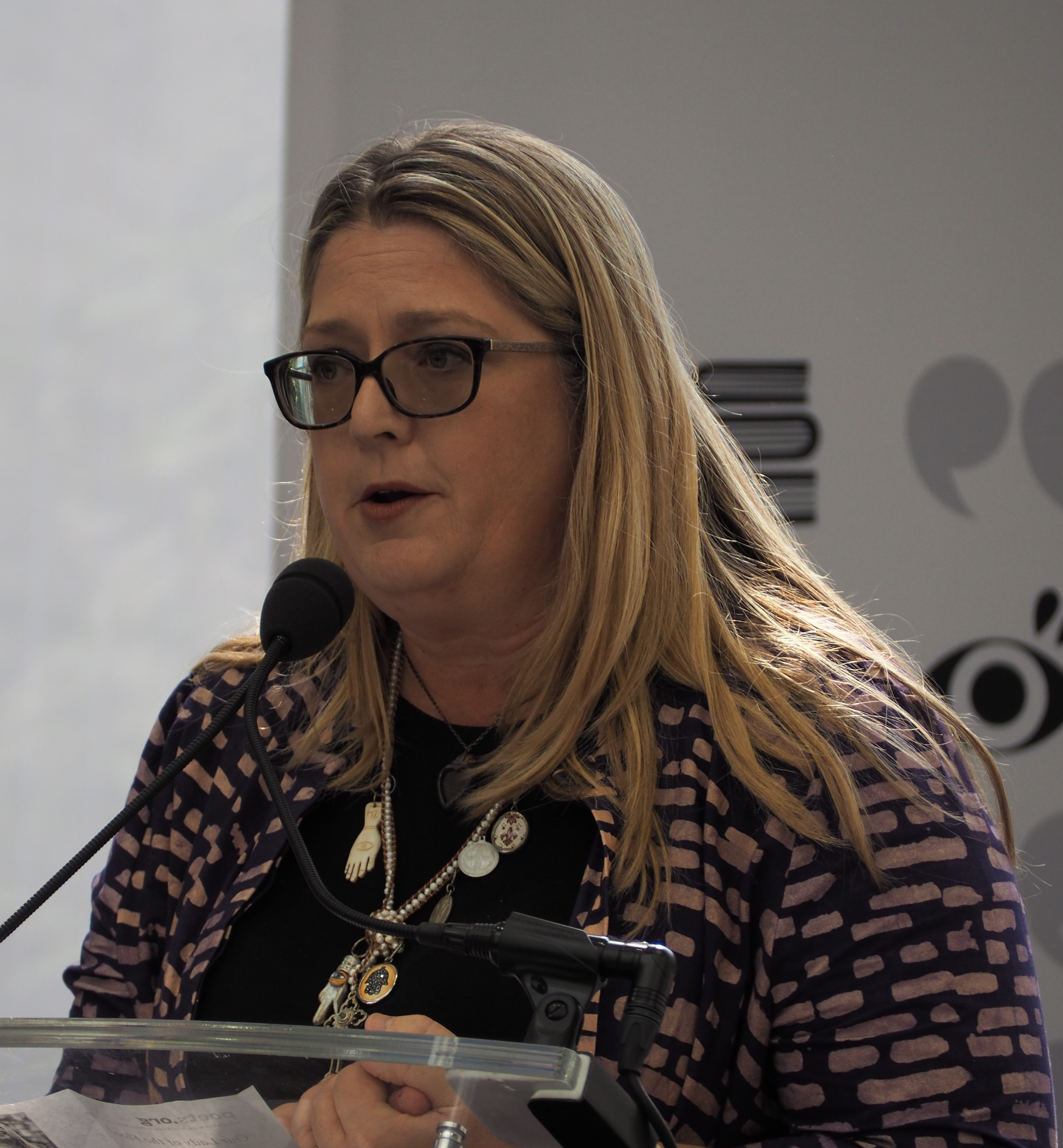
- Born: New Orleans, Louisiana, USA
- Education: University of Arkansas
- Occupations: Poet; writer; lecturer
- Writing career
- Notable works: Our Lady of Bewilderment; Waterlines; Hurricane Party; Big Muddy River of Stars; The Zydeco Tablets
- Notable awards: Akron Poetry Prize
- Website: alisonpelegrin.com

Alison Pelegrin is an American poet, writer, and English lecturer. She is the author of several poetry collections, including Our Lady of Bewilderment (LSU 2022), Waterlines (LSU 2016), Hurricane Party (Akron 2011), and Big Muddy River of Stars (2007), which won the Akron Poetry Prize. In 2023, she was appointed the Poet Laureate of Louisiana, serving through 2025.

== Biography ==
Alison Pelegrin was born and raised in New Orleans, Louisiana. She earned her Master of Fine Arts in poetry from the University of Arkansas.

Pelegrin has taught English at Southeastern Louisiana University (SLU) for more than two decades. In 2023, she was appointed the Poet Laureate of Louisiana, serving through 2025. As of 2024, she is SLU's writer-in-residence. Her work has appeared in notable literary journals such as Poetry, Ploughshares, The Southern Review, The Missouri Review, and The Bennington Review. Several of her poems are available as free printable broadsides at Broadsided Press.

Pelegrin is married to Bryan Davidson and has two adult children. She and her husband live in Covington.

== Awards and honors ==
Pelegrin has received multiple notable fellowships and grants, including a fellowship from the Louisiana Division of the Arts, a Creative Writing Fellowship from the National Endowment for the Arts (2007), and an ATLAS Grant from the Louisiana Board of Regents.

== Publications ==
- Voodoo Lips (Poems and Plays, 2002) - Chapbook
- The Zydeco Tablets (Word Press, 2002)
- Big Muddy River of Stars (University of Akron Press, 2007)
- Hurricane Party (University of Akron Press, 2011)
- Waterlines (Louisiana State University Press, 2016)
- Our Lady of Bewilderment (Louisiana State University Press, 2022)
