= Diana Ramírez de Arellano =

American poet

- Born: June 3, 1919; New York City
- Died: April 30, 1997 (aged 77); New York City
- Occupation(s): Poet, professor
- Employer: City College of New York

Diana Ramírez de Arellano (June 3, 1919 - April 30, 1997) was an American poet, literary critic and professor of Spanish language and literature. A former Poet Laureate of Puerto Rico, she taught at the City College of New York for many years. In 1963, she founded the Ateneo Puertorriqueño de Nueva York, a cultural center for Puerto Ricans in New York.

== Early life ==
Ramírez de Arellano was born in New York City to the former Teresa Rechani and Puerto Rican journalist Enrique Ramírez Brau. She was the great-granddaughter of journalist Salvador Brau. As a small child, Ramírez de Arellano moved with her family to Puerto Rico, where she attended school.

After earning an undergraduate degree at the University of Puerto Rico and teaching high school in Manatí, Ramírez de Arellano returned to New York to attend graduate school at the Teachers College, Columbia University, where she earned a master's degree in 1946.

== Career ==
Between 1946 and 1952, Ramírez de Arellano was a Spanish instructor at the University of North Carolina and Rutgers University and she earned a Ph.D. at the Complutense University of Madrid. She joined the faculty at Rutgers as an assistant professor, where she taught for six years before joining the City College of New York for the rest of her career. She was named Poet Laureate of Puerto Rico in 1958.

In addition to her books of poetry, which included Yo soy ariel and Albatros sobre el alma, Ramírez de Arellano was known for her works of literary criticism. She also wrote for publications such as El Mundo, and in 1963 she founded the Ateneo Puertorriqueño de Nueva York, a scholarly and cultural society for Puerto Ricans in her state.

Ramírez de Arellano died in New York City in 1997. Hunter College maintains the Diana Ramírez de Arellano Papers at its Center for Puerto Rican Studies.
