= Irene Welch Grissom =

American poet (1873–1965)

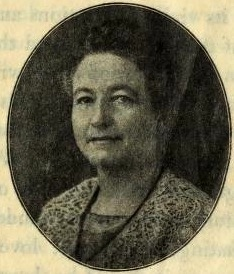
Irene Welch Grissom

Irene Althea Welch Grissom (December 3, 1873 – July 14, 1965) was the first Poet Laureate of Idaho from 1923 to 1948.

== Early life ==
Irene Althea Welch Grissom was born on December 3, 1873, in Greeley, Colorado, the daughter of William Pringle Welch (1834–1893) and Theresa Sobieski Crittenden (1841–1916).

She obtained a Pd.B. from Colorado State Teachers' College in Greeley in 1894; she did post-graduate work in 1927 and a summer school student at University of Montana in 1934 and at University of Colorado in 1937.

== Career ==
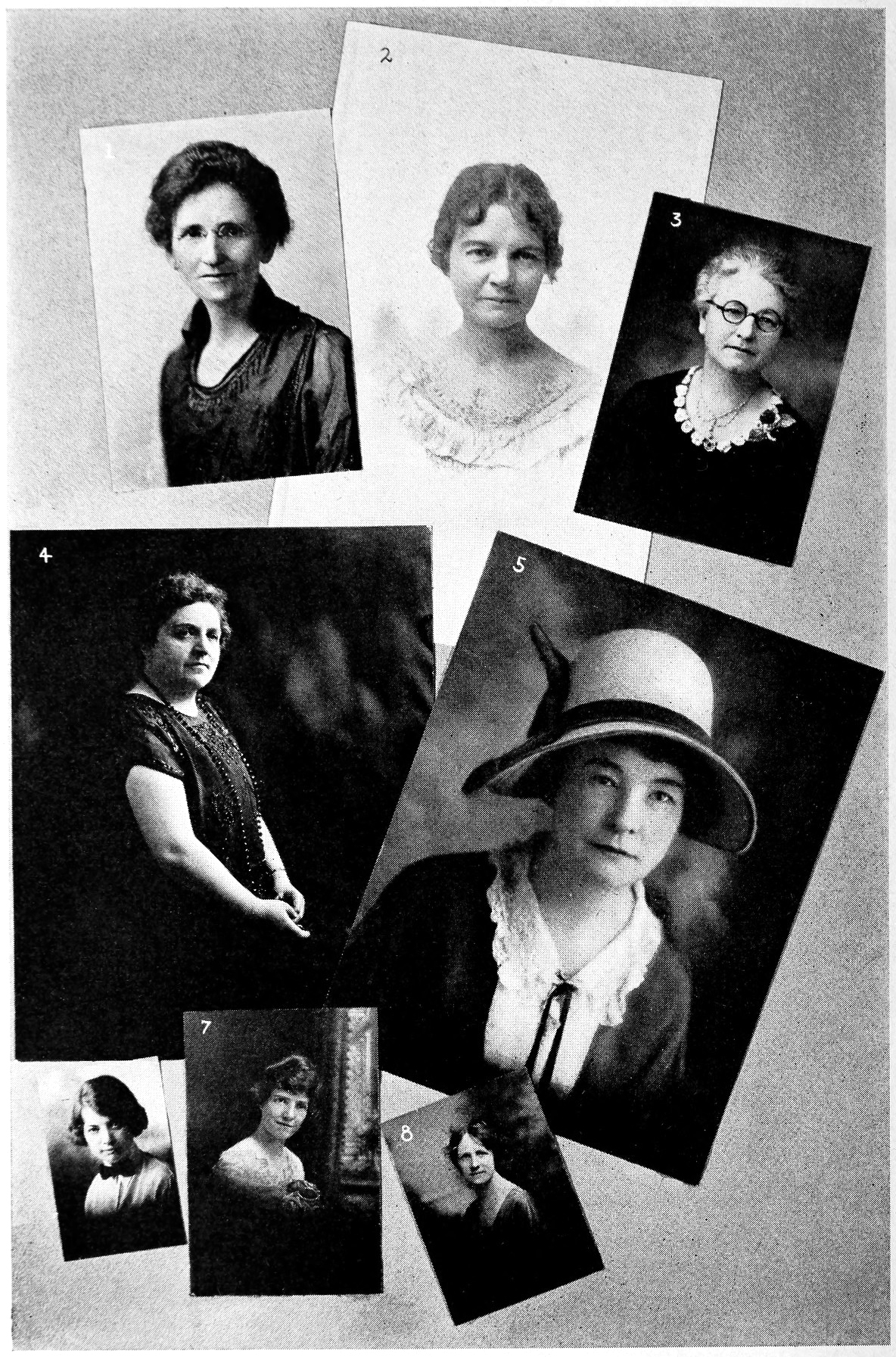
1) Maggie Smith Hathaway, 2) Alma Margaret Higgins, 3) Irene Welch Grissom, 4) Ethel Redfield, 5) Alma E. Plumb, 6) Letitia H. Erb, 7) Mrs. Bernard McHugh, 8) Catherine E. Van Valkeburg

She was a writer and entertainer. She was appointed poet laureate of Idaho by State Governor Charles C. Moore, in June 1923.

She is the author of:

- "The Superintendent", published in 1910 and endorsed by the American Library Association. "The Superintendent" was published by Alice Harriman, whose publishing company originated in Seattle in 1907.
- "A Daughter of the Northwest" (1918)
- "The Passing of the Desert" (1924), verses
- "Verse of the New West" (1931)
- "Under Desert Skies, and other verse" (1936)
- "Whirling Saws" (1941)
- "We Harness a River" (1946)
- "Desert Wed: a Story-poem" (1950)
- "Under Rocky Mountain Skies" (1952)
- "The winds of chance: a story in verse" (1959)
- "Lyrics of the West" (1961)
- "The Passing of the Sagebrush, and Other Verse"

She contributed verses and stories to The Overland Monthly, Outdoor Life, Outdoor America, The Lariat, Poet's Scroll, A Child's Garden and other newspapers of the northwest.

She made appearances in recital of verse at University of Idaho, State Conventions of Idaho Women's Club, and more.

She was a member of the Idaho Falls Round Table and the Northwest Poetry Society.

== Personal life ==
Irene Welch Grissom lived in Washington, Oregon, Texas, New Mexico and Canada, and moved to Idaho in 1914. On September 2, 1903, she married Charles Meigs Grissom (died in 1935). She lived at Idaho Falls, Idaho.

She died on July 14, 1965, in Arcadia, California, and is buried at Rose Hill Cemetery in Idaho Falls, Idaho.
