= Sheryl Noethe =

American poet laureate

Sheryl Noethe is an American poet and served as Montana's poet laureate from 2011 to 2013.

== Biography ==
Born in Minnesota "into a family that didn't read books", Noethe discovered writing through a collection of Dorothy Parker's short stories and read voraciously to escape an abusive home life. In 5th grade, her teacher told her that she would become an author, which she credits with changing her life. By Noethe's teens, she had published poetry.

== Honors ==
Noethe has won or received the following honors:

- Academy of American Poets Award
- McKnight Foundation fellowship
- National Endowment for the Arts fellowship
- Montana Arts Council fellowship
- Emerging Voices Award – New Rivers Press
- Honorable mention – Pushcart Prize
- 2004 Cultural Achievement Award from the Missoula Cultural Council for her work in Missoula schools
