= Henry Real Bird =

Native American poet (born 1948)

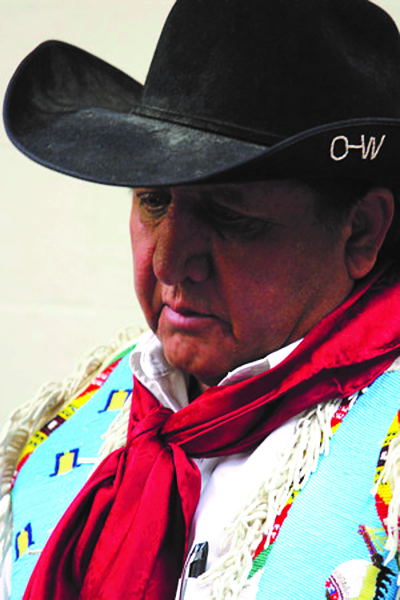
- Henry Real Bird at National Folk Festival, Butte, Montana, 2008
- Born: July 24, 1948 (age 78); Montana, U.S.
- Writing career
- Genre: Poetry

Henry Real Bird (born July 24, 1948) is an American poet who served as the third poet laureate of Montana. He is a member of the Crow Nation.

== Life ==
Real Bird was raised by his grandparents ranching on the Crow Reservation in Montana, and entered first grade speaking only the Crow Indian Language, which as his primary language gives form to his poetry. He competed as a saddle bronc rider during college, where in 1969, he dislocated his hip after being thrown and dragged by his foot. The injury began his, "transition out of the physical world of bronc riding into the spiritual world of writing," he said. During this time, he read works from Longfellow, Tennyson, Thoreau, and Edgar Allan Poe, which inspired much of his writing. Real Bird remained on the pro rodeo circuit until 1980, when he finally hung up the saddle after years of continued pain. He eventually received his bachelor's in elementary education from Montana State University-Bozeman and went on to receive a master's from MSU-Billings.

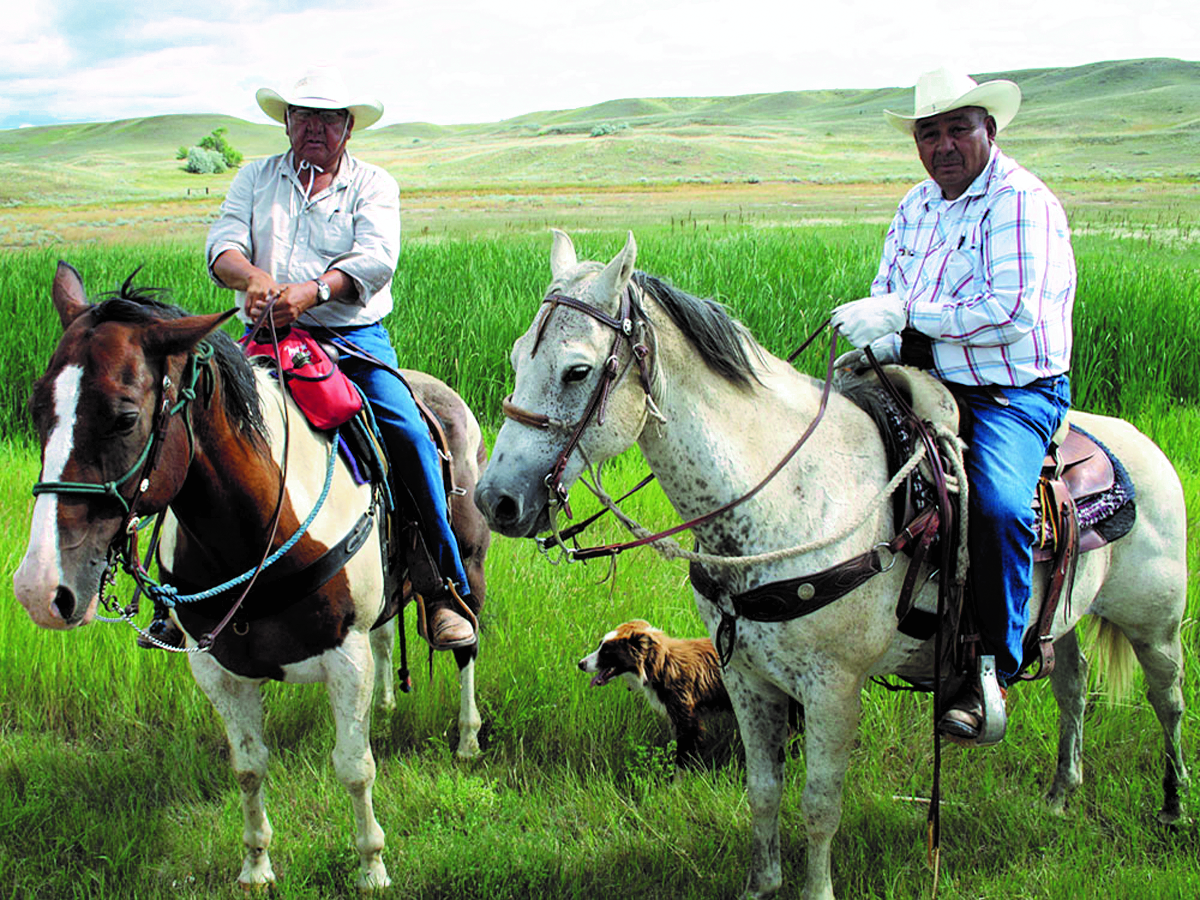
Real Bird on horseback. (left side)

== Writing ==
Real Bird has written six anthologies, four poetry collections, and twelve children's books which he also illustrated. He is a cowboy poet and recites work annually at the Cowboy Poetry Gathering in Elko, Nevada. The National Cowboy Hall of Fame granted him the Western Heritage Award for his poetry that reflects his fusion of cowboy, horsemanship, and Crow culture. In 2009, Gov. Schweitzer of Montana appointed Real Bird as the third poet laureate of Montana. In the summer of 2010, as the poet laureate, Real Bird traveled by horseback 415 miles to distribute books of poetry.

== Crow education ==
Real Bird is intimately involved in Crow youth education and preservation of Crow tradition, and as a reading teacher in all the elementary grades has deep knowledge of problems Indian children face in the public school system. He worked as Curriculum Coordinator for Project Head Start, Language Art Supervisor at St. Xavier Indian Mission and Summer Program Planner for 4-H and Youth Programs on the Crow reservation, and served as the president of Little Big Horn College located on the reservation. Real Bird has also served on the Montana Advisory Committee on Children and Youth and the Crow Central Education Commission. As the Teacher Orientation Specialist for the pacific Northwest Indian Program, he along with Karen Stone and Joseph Coburn developed The Indian Reading Series, which is a reading and language development program utilized across twelve Native American reservations across the Northwest. The series consists of a teaching manual and stories written by Real Bird in both Crow and English, some of which include Birds and People, Far Out, A Rodeo Horse, and Tepee, Sun, and Time. Read Bird fights for the maintaining of the Crow language, which has largely disappeared in contemporary generations, as a way to preserve Crow tradition and culture.

== Personal life ==
At the time of his appointment as Montana poet laureate, Real Bird lived on his south-central Montana ranch near Garryowen, Montana.
