= Margaret Britton Vaughn =

American poet (1938–2026)

Margaret Britton Vaughn (July 16, 1938 – June 27, 2026) was an American poet laureate.

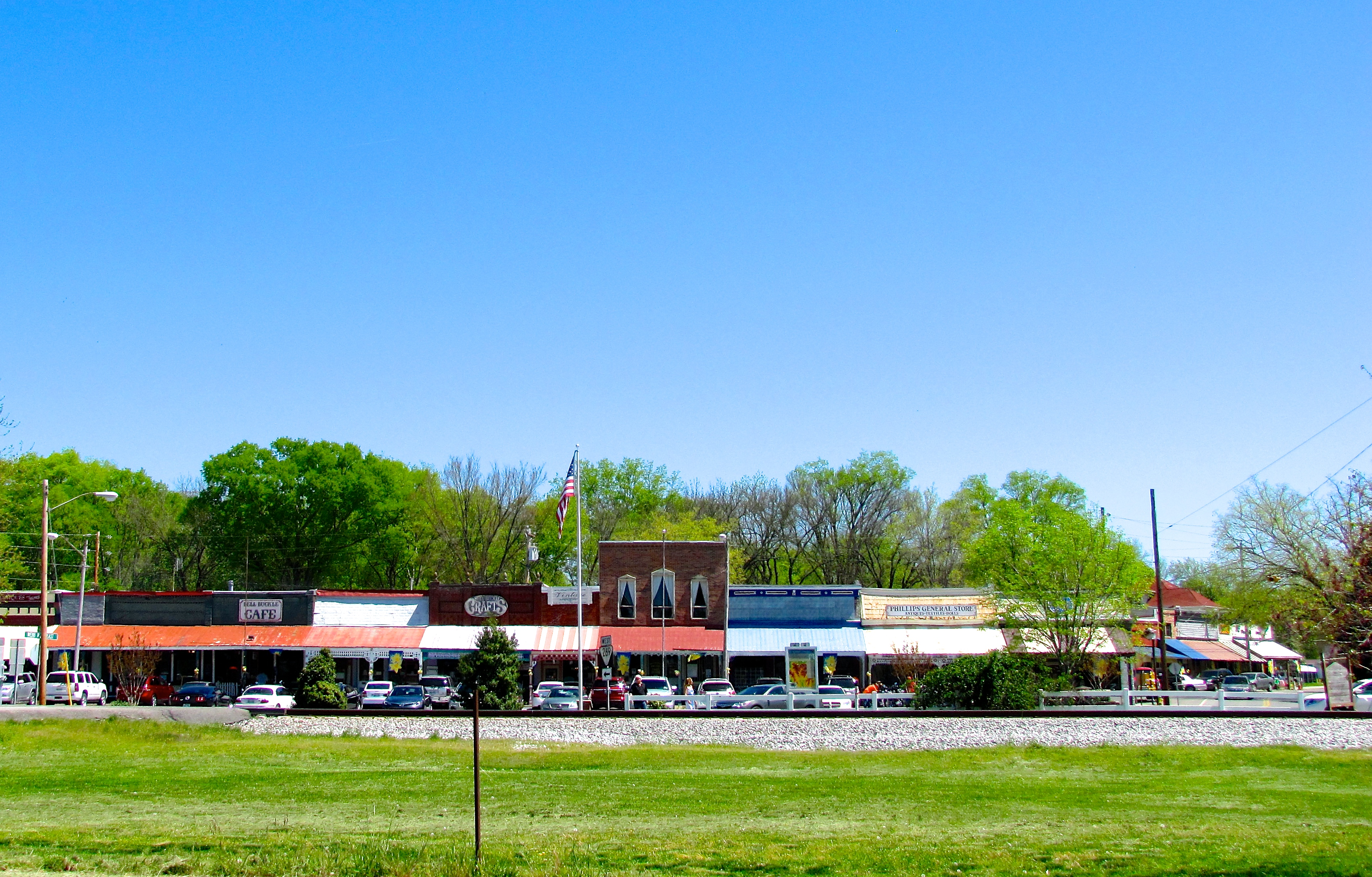
Vaughn was a long time resident of Bell Buckle, Tennessee and operated a store in the pictured downtown area.

== Background ==
Vaughn was born in Murfreesboro, Tennessee on July 16, 1938. Her father, Winfred Vaughn, a fire fighter, was killed in the line of duty when Vaughn was 9 months old. When Vaughn was four years old she moved with her remarried mother and brother to Gulfport, Mississippi.

She was baptized Methodist the Methodist church and raised in the Church of Christ. She attended the Episcopal Church. Her belief in hypocrisy and unnecessary rules of the church inspired her book You're Laughing, Ain’t Ya, God?

Vaughn lived in Bell Buckle, Tennessee, and was frequently visited by people seeking mentorship, advice and conversations about poetry. Celebrity visitors include Bill Moyers and Maya Angelou. Vaughn overcame both kidney and breast cancer.

She was friends with late country singer Loretta Lynn, whom she met through the Wilburn brothers in the 1960s. They bonded over similar writing styles and collaborated throughout their careers. Vaughn helped write Lynn's Grammy-nominated 2004 song "Miss Being Mrs. Lynn".

Vaughn died on June 27, 2026, at the age of 87.

== Career ==
Vaughn attended Perkinston Junior College and transferred to Mississippi Southern College, but she ultimately left this school without a degree in her senior year. Twenty-five years later, she completed her degree at Middle Tennessee State University with a degree in theater.

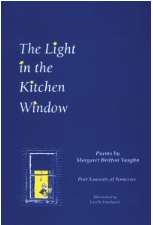
Cover art for Vaughn's The Light in The Kitchen Window

Vaughn has expressed that the talents of poetry are inherited and their pursuit inevitable. She herself gave up her career of seventeen years in advertising to pursue writing full time, to her family and friends’ dismay. She began this transition by working in a newspaper to build her skills then fully committing to poetry. She is the only recipient of the Mark Twain fellowship from Elmira College. Her time in a place Mark Twain once lived in inspired her work, Foretasting Heaven: Conversations with Twain at Quarry Farm.

She described her writing as communicating the experience of living in small towns. From a young age, she was inspired by and heavily influenced by country music and wrote poems and songs. She has also written plays performed at the numerous Tennessee theaters; her most famous play, I Wonder if Eleanor Roosevelt Ever Made a Quilt, was performed at the National Quilter's Convention.

In 1995, the Tennessee state legislature selected Vaughn to be Tennessee's poet laureate citing many of the plays, collections, and books Vaughn wrote throughout her career and her performances and outreach throughout the state of Tennessee. As poet laureate, Vaughn wrote Tennessee's bicentennial poem, inaugural poems for many Tennessee governors including current governor, Bill Lee, and a poem to commemorate the 50th anniversary of the US Air Force.

== Bibliography ==
List of Vaughn's published Written Works
Title	Year Published	Publisher	Pages	Notes
50 Years of Saturday Nights: (poems) as told by the Old Spry herself	1975	Magluce Publishing Company	52	
Grand ole Saturday Nights	1990	Bell Buckle Press	96	
Kin	1994	Iris Press	75	
The light in the kitchen window: poems	1994	Iris Press	74	
Acres that Grow Stones: poetry	1996	Bell Buckle Press	53	
Southern Voices in Every Direction	1996	Bell Buckle Press	159	co-author: Su Ellen Alfred
Life's Down to Old Women's Shoes: poetry and personal essays	1997	Bell Buckle Press	61	
Bell Buckle Biscuits: stories	1999	Bell Buckle Press	128	
The Birthday Dolly	2000	Bell Buckle Press	47	co-authors: Carole Brown Knuth, Lucille Lundquist
Foretasting Heaven: talking to Twain at Quarry Farm	2002	Bell Buckle Press	55	
America Showing her Colors in Black and White: poetry and photography	2002	Bell Buckle Press	-	
You're Laughing, ain't ya God?	2006	Bell Buckle Press	52	
When Grown Ups Play Children's Games	2006	Bell Buckle Press	51	
The Other Sun of God	2010	Bell Buckle Press	37	
Mary Rebecca, Bubba, and Me	2010	Bell Buckle Press	89	
Shades of Walter Inglis Anderson	2012	Bell Buckle Press	79	co-author: Carole Brown Knuth
Out of the Box	2015	Bell Buckle Press	72	co-authors: Carole Brown Knuth, Kory Wells
