= JoAnn Balingit =

American poet

- Born: Columbus, Ohio, U.S.
- Occupation: Poet, writer
- Education: University of California, Irvine (BA); Indiana University (MLS); University of Delaware (EdD)
- Genre: Non-fiction

Website
- joannbalingit.org

JoAnn Balingit is an American poet and nonfiction writer who served as the 16th poet laureate of Delaware. Appointed to the position by governor Ruth Ann Minner from May 2008 until 2015, she was the first person of color to hold the title. She is also a reporter for Delaware Online, a subsection of The News Journal, and an adjunct professor at the University of Delaware, where she teaches poetry.

Balingit is the author of the book Words For House Story, a poetry collection featured in Beltway Poetry Quarterly, a Washington D.C.–based Literary Journal. She also wrote two award-winning chapbooks, Forage and Your Heart and How It Works, which explore female identity and Philippine ancestry. More of her published work can be found in anthologies such as No Place Like Here: Southern Delaware Poetry and Prose and On the Mason Dixon Line: Contemporary Delaware Writers.

== Personal life ==
Balingit was born in Columbus, Ohio, to a German American mother and a Filipino immigrant father as the third eldest of twelve children. She later moved to Lakeland, Florida, where she was raised. She earned her B.A. in English Literature from University of California, Irvine, went on to complete a M.L.S. from Indiana University and earned her Doctorate in Education from the University of Delaware.

She currently resides in northern Delaware. She has four children: Savannah, Bahiya, Adrian, and Julian.
