= Daniel Laby =

American ophthalmologist

- Born: Daniel M. Laby
- Occupation: Ophthalmologist
- Years active: 1990s–present
- Known for: Sports vision, pediatric ophthalmology

Academic background
- Education: George Washington University School of Medicine & Health Sciences (MD)

Academic work
- Institutions: Harvard Medical School; State University of New York College of Optometry
- Notable works: Sports vision pyramid

Daniel Laby is an ophthalmologist and professor known for his contributions to the field of sports vision. He currently holds the position of Clinical professor and director of the Sports and Performance Vision Center at the State University of New York College of Optometry and has previously served as a Clinical Professor of Ophthalmology at Harvard Medical School. He has served as a sports ophthalmologist for Major League Baseball teams including Boston Red Sox and for athletes like Manny Ramirez and Trent Alexander-Arnold.

== Biography ==
He received his medical degree from George Washington University School of Medicine in 1987.

His career began in the early 1990s when he was a fellow at UCLA, conducting research in pediatric ophthalmology, following a disappointing 1992 season, the Los Angeles Dodgers enlisted Laby to assist with a sports performance project they were developing.

He has also worked with other Major League Baseball teams, including the New York Mets, St. Louis Cardinals, Boston Red Sox, Cleveland Indians, Houston Astros, Tampa Bay Rays, and Chicago Cubs.

He has served as a staff ophthalmologist for three NBA teams, an NHL team, and international teams from Korea and the Middle East.

He has been the staff ophthalmologist for the USA Olympic team, attending the Beijing Summer Olympics, and assisted the international baseball team that first qualified for the 2021 Tokyo Summer Olympics. He also worked with English Premier League player and consulted with an NFL team regarding a player's on-field performance.

Laby's research centers on the visual requirements of sports and the ways in which training can enhance athletes' performance. He has developed specialized visual tests and training protocols to improve visual acuity and reaction times in athletes.

He co-authored a meta-analysis with Greg Applebaum to establish an evidence-based framework for sports vision research. His research has shown a strong relationship between visual function and athletic performance, particularly in baseball. He has published studies demonstrating the impact of visual training on metrics such as plate discipline in baseball players.

In 2023, he collaborated with Red Bull and Liverpool FC's Trent Alexander-Arnold to assess and enhance the player's on-field visual abilities.

== Selected publications ==
- Laby, Daniel M.; Davidson, John L.; Rosenbaum, Louis J.; Strasser, Charles; Mellman, Michael F.; Rosenbaum, Arthur L.; Kirschen, David G. (1996). "The Visual Function of Professional Baseball Players". American Journal of Ophthalmology. 122 (4): 476–485. doi:10.1016/S0002-9394(14)72106-3. PMID 8862043.
- Laby, Daniel M; Kirschen, David G; Rosenbaum, Arthur L; Mellman, Michael F (1998). "The effect of ocular dominance on the performance of professional baseball players". Ophthalmology. 105 (5): 864–866. doi:10.1016/S0161-6420(98)95027-8. PMID 9593388.
- Laby, Daniel M; Rosenbaum, Arthur L (1994). "Adjustable Vertical Rectus Muscle Transposition Surgery". Journal of Pediatric Ophthalmology & Strabismus. 31 (2): 75–78. doi:10.3928/0191-3913-19940301-03. ISSN 0191-3913. PMID 8014790.
- Laby, Daniel M; Kirschen, David G; Rosenbaum, Arthur L; Mellman, Michael F (1998). "The effect of ocular dominance on the performance of professional baseball players". Ophthalmology. 105 (5): 864–866. doi:10.1016/S0161-6420(98)95027-8. PMID 9593388.
- Laby, Daniel M.; Kirschen, David G. (2011). "Thoughts on Ocular Dominance—Is It Actually a Preference?". Eye & Contact Lens. 37 (3): 140–144. doi:10.1097/ICL.0b013e31820e0bdf. ISSN 1542-233X. PMID 21455079.
- Laby, Daniel M.; Appelbaum, Lawrence Gregory (2021). "Review: Vision and On-field Performance: A Critical Review of Visual Assessment and Training Studies with Athletes". Optometry and Vision Science. 98 (7): 723. doi:10.1097/OPX.0000000000001729. ISSN 1538-9235. PMID 34328451.
- Laby, Daniel M.; Kirschen, David G.; Govindarajulu, Usha; DeLand, Paul (2019-11-14). "The Effect of Visual Function on the Batting Performance of Professional Baseball Players". Scientific Reports. 9 (1): 16847. Bibcode:2019NatSR...916847L. doi:10.1038/s41598-019-52546-2. ISSN 2045-2322. PMC 6856529. PMID 31728011.
