= 2022 Delaware House of Representatives election =

2022 Delaware House of Representatives elections
- November 8, 2022

All 41 seats in the Delaware House of Representatives 21 seats needed for a majority
	Majority party	Minority party
Leader	Peter Schwartzkopf	Daniel Short
Party	Democratic	Republican
Leader since	January 8, 2013	January 8, 2013
Leader's seat	14th - Rehoboth Beach	39th - Seaford
Last election	26	15
Seats won	26	15
Seat change	Steady	Steady
Popular vote	149,213	138,326
Percentage	51.44%	47.68%
- Results: Democratic hold Democratic gain Republican hold Republican gain
Speaker before election
Peter Schwartzkopf
Democratic
Elected Speaker
Peter Schwartzkopf
Democratic

The 2022 Delaware House of Representatives elections took place on November 8, 2022, as part of the 2022 United States elections. The election coincided with elections for other offices, including for U.S. House, Attorney General, and state senate. Delaware voters elected state senators in all 41 of the state's Senate districts. 41 State Representatives serve four-year terms in the Delaware House of Representatives.

A primary election on September 13, 2022, determined which candidates would appear on the November 8 general election ballot. Primary election results can be obtained from the Delaware Secretary of State's website. Following the 2022 state House of Representatives elections, Democrats maintained control of the House, having a majority with 26 members. Republicans held 15 seats.

== Predictions ==
Source	Ranking	As of
Sabato's Crystal Ball	Safe D	May 19, 2022

== 4th District special election ==
Democrat Gerald Brady resigned his seat on January 31, 2022. Democrat Charles Freel defeated Republican Ted Kittila in a special election held on March 5, 2022, to fill Brady's unexpired term.

Delaware House of Representatives 4th district special election, 2022
Party	Candidate	Votes	%
Democratic	Charles Freel	2,210	68.42%
Republican	Ted Kittila	1,015	31.42%
Write-in		5	0.15%
Total votes		3,230	100%
Democratic hold			

== Results summary ==
District	Incumbent	Party	Elected	Party
1st	Nnamdi Chukwuocha	Dem	Nnamdi Chukwuocha	Dem
2nd	Stephanie Bolden	Dem	Stephanie Bolden	Dem
3rd	Sherry Dorsey Walker	Dem	Sherry Dorsey Walker	Dem
4th	New Seat		Jeff Hilovsky	Rep
5th	Kendra Johnson	Dem	Kendra Johnson	Dem
6th	Debra Heffernan	Dem	Debra Heffernan	Dem
7th	Larry Lambert	Dem	Larry Lambert	Dem
8th	Sherae'a Moore	Dem	Sherae'a Moore	Dem
9th	Kevin Hensley	Rep	Kevin Hensley	Rep
10th	Sean Matthews	Dem	Sean Matthews	Dem
11th	Jeffrey Spiegelman	Rep	Jeffrey Spiegelman	Rep
12th	Krista Griffith	Dem	Krista Griffith	Dem
12th	Charles Freel† (Note: Redistricted from the 4th district.)	Dem	Krista Griffith	Dem
13th	Larry Mitchell	Dem	DeShanna Neal	Dem
14th	Peter Schwartzkopf	Dem	Peter Schwartzkopf	Dem
15th	Valerie Longhurst	Dem	Valerie Longhurst	Dem
16th	Franklin Cooke Jr.	Dem	Franklin Cooke Jr.	Dem
17th	Melissa Minor-Brown	Dem	Melissa Minor-Brown	Dem
18th	David Bentz†	Dem	Sophie Phillips	Dem
19th	Kimberly Williams	Dem	Kimberly Williams	Dem
20th	Stephen Smyk†	Rep	Stell Selby	Dem
21st	Michael Ramone	Rep	Michael Ramone	Rep
22nd	Michael Smith	Rep	Michael Smith	Rep
23rd	Paul Baumbach	Dem	Paul Baumbach	Dem
24th	Edward Osienski	Dem	Edward Osienski	Dem
25th	John Kowalko Jr.†	Dem	Cyndie Romer	Dem
26th	Madinah Wilson-Anton	Dem	Madinah Wilson-Anton	Dem
27th	Eric Morrison	Dem	Eric Morrison	Dem
28th	William Carson Jr.	Dem	William Carson Jr.	Dem
29th	William Bush IV	Dem	William Bush IV	Dem
30th	Shannon Morris	Rep	Shannon Morris	Rep
31st	Sean Lynn	Dem	Sean Lynn	Dem
32nd	Andria Bennett†	Dem	Kerri Evelyn Harris	Dem
33rd	Charles Postles Jr.	Rep	Charles Postles Jr.	Rep
34th	Lyndon Yearick	Rep	Lyndon Yearick	Rep
35th	Jesse Vanderwende	Rep	Jesse Vanderwende	Rep
36th	Bryan Shupe	Rep	Bryan Shupe	Rep
37th	Ruth Briggs King	Rep	Ruth Briggs King	Rep
38th	Ronald Gray	Rep	Ronald Gray	Rep
39th	Daniel Short	Rep	Daniel Short	Rep
40th	Timothy Dukes	Rep	Timothy Dukes	Rep
41st	Richard Collins	Rep	Richard Collins	Rep

† - Incumbent not seeking re-election

=== Statewide ===
Party	Candi- dates	Votes	%	Seats	+/–
Democratic	32	149,213	51.44%	26	Steady
Republican	34	138,326	47.68%	15	Steady
Non-Partisan Delaware	3	1,251	0.43%	0	Steady
Libertarian	1	655	0.23%	0	Steady
Independent	1	350	0.12%	0	Steady
Write-in	1	290	0.10%	0	Steady
Total	72	290,085	100%	41	Steady

=== Closest races ===
Seats where the margin of victory was under 10%:

1. District 21, 0.4%
2. District 20, 2.88% gain
3. District 27, 6.7%

=== Retirements ===
- Charles Freel (D-District 12) (Note: Redistricted from the 4th district.)
- David Bentz (D-District 18)
- Stephen Smyk (R-District 20), to run for the State Senate.
- John Kowlako Jr. (D-District 25)
- Andria Bennett (D-District 32)

=== Incumbents defeated in the primary election ===
- Larry Mitchell (D-District 13), defeated by DeShanna Neal (D)

== Detailed results ==
Results of the 2022 Delaware House of Representatives election by district:

=== District 1 ===
Incumbent Democrat Nnamdi Chukwuocha had represented the 1st District since 2018. Democratic primary

Delaware House of Representatives 1st district Democratic primary election, 2022
Party	Candidate	Votes	%
Democratic	Nnamdi Chukwuocha (incumbent)	1,427	51.63%
Democratic	Shane Nicole Darby	1,337	48.37%
Total votes		2,764	100%

General election

Delaware House of Representatives 1st district general election, 2022
Party	Candidate	Votes	%
Democratic	Nnamdi Chukwuocha (incumbent)	5,514	88.08%
Republican	Mark Gardner	746	11.92%
Total votes		6,260	100%
Democratic hold			

=== District 2 ===
Incumbent Democrat Stephanie Bolden had represented the 2nd District since 2010. Democratic primary

Delaware House of Representatives 2nd district Democratic primary election, 2022
Party	Candidate	Votes	%
Democratic	Stephanie Bolden (incumbent)	711	62.10%
Democratic	James Taylor	434	37.90%
Total votes		1,145	100%

General election

Delaware House of Representatives 2nd district general election, 2022
Party	Candidate	Votes	%
Democratic	Stephanie Bolden (incumbent)	3,155	100%
Total votes		3,155	100%
Democratic hold			

=== District 3 ===
Incumbent Democrat Sherry Dorsey Walker had represented the 3rd District since 2018.

Delaware House of Representatives 3rd district general election, 2022
Party	Candidate	Votes	%
Democratic	Sherry Dorsey Walker (incumbent)	3,226	100%
Total votes		3,226	100%
Democratic hold			

=== District 4 ===
The new 4th District is based in Sussex County and includes Long Neck, Angola, and Warwick. The new district had no incumbent. Republican Jeff Hilovsky won the open seat. Republican primary

Delaware House of Representatives 4th district Republican primary election, 2022
Party	Candidate	Votes	%
Republican	Jeff Hilovsky	1,372	61.06%
Republican	Bradley Layfield	875	38.94%
Total votes		2,247	100%

General election

Delaware House of Representatives 4th district general election, 2022
Party	Candidate	Votes	%
Republican	Jeff Hilovsky	6,664	57.32%
Democratic	Keegan Worley	4,611	39.66%
Independent Party	Amy S. Fresh	350	3.01%
Total votes		11,625	100%
Republican win (new seat)			

=== District 5 ===
Incumbent Democrat Kendra Johnson had represented the 5th District since 2018.

Delaware House of Representatives 5th district general election, 2022
Party	Candidate	Votes	%
Democratic	Kendra Johnson (incumbent)	4,223	79.63%
Republican	Alexander M. Homich	1,008	19.01%
Non-Partisan Delaware	Mark Parks	72	1.36%
Total votes		5,303	100%
Democratic hold			

=== District 6 ===
Incumbent Democrat Debra Heffernan had represented the 6th District since 2018. Democratic primary

Delaware House of Representatives 6th district Democratic primary election, 2022
Party	Candidate	Votes	%
Democratic	Debra Heffernan (incumbent)	1,567	55.51%
Democratic	Becca Cotto	1,256	44.49%
Total votes		2,823	100%

General election

Delaware House of Representatives 6th district general election, 2022
Party	Candidate	Votes	%
Democratic	Debra Heffernan (incumbent)	6,352	67.86%
Republican	Michael Krawczuk	3,008	32.14%
Total votes		9,360	100%
Democratic hold			

=== District 7 ===
Incumbent Democrat Larry Lambert had represented the 7th District since 2020.

Delaware House of Representatives 7th district general election, 2022
Party	Candidate	Votes	%
Democratic	Larry Lambert (incumbent)	4,657	71.28%
Republican	Shane S. Stoneman	1,876	28.72%
Total votes		6,533	100%
Democratic hold			

=== District 8 ===
Incumbent Democrat Sherae'a Moore had represented the 8th District since 2020.

Delaware House of Representatives 8th district general election, 2022
Party	Candidate	Votes	%
Democratic	Sherae'a Moore (incumbent)	4,760	58.07%
Republican	David Thomas	3,437	41.93%
Total votes		8,197	100%
Democratic hold			

=== District 9 ===
Incumbent Republican Kevin Hensley had represented the 9th District since 2014.

Delaware House of Representatives 9th district general election, 2022
Party	Candidate	Votes	%
Republican	Kevin Hensley (incumbent)	5,719	55.91%
Democratic	Terrell Williams	4,510	44.09%
Total votes		10,229	100%
Republican hold			

=== District 10 ===
Incumbent Democrat Sean Matthews had represented the 10th District since 2014.

Delaware House of Representatives 10th district general election, 2022
Party	Candidate	Votes	%
Democratic	Sean Matthews (incumbent)	5,867	65.29%
Republican	Brent Burdge	3,119	34.71%
Total votes		8,986	100%
Democratic hold			

=== District 11 ===
Incumbent Republican Jeffrey Spiegelman had represented the 11th District since 2012.

Delaware House of Representatives 11th district general election, 2022
Party	Candidate	Votes	%
Republican	Jeffrey Spiegelman (incumbent)	5,858	100%
Total votes		5,858	100%
Republican hold			

=== District 12 ===
The new 12th district includes the homes of incumbent Democrats Krista Griffith, who had represented the 12th District since 2018, and Charles Freel, who had represented the 4th district since winning a special election in 2022. Freel did not seek re-election, and Griffith was re-elected here.

Delaware House of Representatives 12th district general election, 2022
Party	Candidate	Votes	%
Democratic	Krista Griffith (incumbent)	7,559	62.96%
Republican	Ben Gregg	4,447	37.04%
Total votes		12,006	100%
Democratic hold			

=== District 13 ===
Incumbent Democrat Larry Mitchell had represented the 13th District since 2006. Mitchell lost re-nomination to fellow Democrat DeShanna Neal, who went on to win the general election. Democratic primary

Delaware House of Representatives 13th district Democratic primary election, 2022
Party	Candidate	Votes	%
Democratic	DeShanna Neal	669	50.91%
Democratic	Larry Mitchell (incumbent)	645	49.09%
Total votes		1,314	100%

General election

Delaware House of Representatives 13th district general election, 2022
Party	Candidate	Votes	%
Democratic	DeShanna Neal	3,389	60.69%
Republican	Carlucci Coehlo	2,195	39.31%
Total votes		5,584	100%
Democratic hold			

=== District 14 ===
Incumbent Democrat House Speaker Peter Schwartzkopf had represented the 14th District since 2002.

Delaware House of Representatives 14th district general election, 2022
Party	Candidate	Votes	%
Democratic	Peter Schwartzkopf (incumbent)	8,455	65.05%
Republican	Carl Phelps	4,543	34.95%
Total votes		12,998	100%
Democratic hold			

=== District 15 ===
Incumbent Democrat and Majority Leader Valerie Longhurst had represented the 15th District since 2004.

Delaware House of Representatives 15th district general election, 2022
Party	Candidate	Votes	%
Democratic	Valerie Longhurst (incumbent)	5,086	68.85%
Republican	Michael Higgin	2,301	31.15%
Total votes		7,387	100%
Democratic hold			

=== District 16 ===
Incumbent Democrat Franklin Cooke Jr. had represented the 16th District since 2018.

Delaware House of Representatives 16th district general election, 2022
Party	Candidate	Votes	%
Democratic	Franklin Cooke Jr. (incumbent)	4,344	100%
Total votes		4,344	100%
Democratic hold			

=== District 17 ===
Incumbent Democrat Melissa Minor-Brown had represented the 17th District since 2018.

Delaware House of Representatives 17th district general election, 2022
Party	Candidate	Votes	%
Democratic	Melissa Minor-Brown (incumbent)	4,363	100%
Total votes		4,363	100%
Democratic hold			

=== District 18 ===
Incumbent Democrat David Bentz had represented the 17th District since 2015. Bentz did not seek re-election, and fellow Democrat Sophie Phillips won the open seat. Democratic primary

Delaware House of Representatives 18th district Democratic primary election, 2022
Party	Candidate	Votes	%
Democratic	Sophie Phillips	821	71.08%
Democratic	Martin Willis	334	28.92%
Total votes		1,155	100%

General election

Delaware House of Representatives 18th district general election, 2022
Party	Candidate	Votes	%
Democratic	Sophie Phillips	4,060	71.49%
Republican	Gloria Payne	1,619	28.51%
Total votes		5,679	100%
Democratic hold			

=== District 19 ===
Incumbent Democrat Kimberly Williams had represented the 19th District since 2012.

Delaware House of Representatives 19th district general election, 2022
Party	Candidate	Votes	%
Democratic	Kimberly Williams (incumbent)	4,669	100%
Total votes		4,669	100%
Democratic hold			

=== District 20 ===
Incumbent Republican Stephen Smyk had represented the 20th District since 2012. Smyk retired to run for the State Senate. Democrat Stell Parker Selby won the open seat.

Delaware House of Representatives 20th district general election, 2022
Party	Candidate	Votes	%
Democratic	Stell Parker Selby	6,635	51.44%
Republican	Dallas Wingate	6,264	48.56%
Total votes		12,899	100%
Democratic gain from Republican			

=== District 21 ===
Incumbent Republican Michael Ramone had represented the 21st District since 2008.

Delaware House of Representatives 21st district general election, 2022
Party	Candidate	Votes	%
Republican	Michael Ramone (incumbent)	4,381	50.20%
Democratic	Frank Burns	4,346	49.80%
Total votes		8,727	100%
Republican hold			

=== District 22 ===
Incumbent Republican Michael Smith had represented the 22nd District since 2018.

Delaware House of Representatives 22nd district general election, 2022
Party	Candidate	Votes	%
Republican	Michael Smith (incumbent)	7,482	96.27%
Independent	William Jason Blevins (write-in)	290	3.73%
Total votes		7,772	100%
Republican hold			

=== District 23 ===
Incumbent Democrat Paul Baumbach had represented the 23rd District since 2012.

Delaware House of Representatives 23rd district general election, 2022
Party	Candidate	Votes	%
Democratic	Paul Baumbach (incumbent)	4,823	61.53%
Republican	Brittany Ramone Gomez	3,016	38.47%
Total votes		7,839	100%
Democratic hold			

=== District 24 ===
Incumbent Democrat Edward Osienski had represented the 24th District since 2010.

Delaware House of Representatives 24th district general election, 2022
Party	Candidate	Votes	%
Democratic	Edward Osienski (incumbent)	3,644	66.40%
Republican	Joan E. Godwin	1,844	33.60%
Total votes		5,488	100%
Democratic hold			

=== District 25 ===
Incumbent Democrat John Kowalko Jr. had represented the 25th District since 2006. Kowalko did not seek re-election, and fellow Democrat Cyndie Romer won the open seat. Democratic primary

Delaware House of Representatives 25th district Democratic primary election, 2022
Party	Candidate	Votes	%
Democratic	Cyndie Romer	1,200	84.93%
Democratic	Edward Klima	213	15.07%
Total votes		1,413	100%

General election

Delaware House of Representatives 25th district general election, 2022
Party	Candidate	Votes	%
Democratic	Cyndie Romer	3,899	64.54%
Republican	Lynn Mey	2,142	35.46%
Total votes		6,041	100%
Democratic hold			

=== District 26 ===
Incumbent Democrat Madinah Wilson-Anton had represented the 26th District since 2020. Democratic primary

Delaware House of Representatives 26th district Democratic primary election, 2022
Party	Candidate	Votes	%
Democratic	Madinah Wilson-Anton (incumbent)	1,059	67.67%
Democratic	Kelly Williams Maresca	506	32.33%
Total votes		1,565	100%

General election

Delaware House of Representatives 26th district general election, 2022
Party	Candidate	Votes	%
Democratic	Madinah Wilson-Anton (incumbent)	3,610	70.48%
Republican	Timothy Conrad	1,512	29.52%
Total votes		5,122	100%
Democratic hold			

=== District 27 ===
Incumbent Democrat Eric Morrison had represented the 27th District since 2020. Democratic primary

Delaware House of Representatives 27th district Democratic primary election, 2022
Party	Candidate	Votes	%
Democratic	Eric Morrison (incumbent)	1,114	66.03%
Democratic	Michael Hertzfeld	573	33.97%
Total votes		1,687	100%

General election

Delaware House of Representatives 27th district general election, 2022
Party	Candidate	Votes	%
Democratic	Eric Morrison (incumbent)	4,835	53.35%
Republican	John Marino	4,227	46.65%
Total votes		9,062	100%
Democratic hold			

=== District 28 ===
Incumbent Democrat William Carson Jr. had represented the 28th District since 2008.

Delaware House of Representatives 28th district general election, 2022
Party	Candidate	Votes	%
Democratic	William Carson Jr. (incumbent)	4,554	100%
Total votes		4,554	100%
Democratic hold			

=== District 29 ===
Incumbent Democrat William Bush IV had represented the 29th District since 2018.

Delaware House of Representatives 29th district general election, 2022
Party	Candidate	Votes	%
Democratic	William Bush IV (incumbent)	5,182	58.54%
Republican	Marc Weinner	3,670	41.46%
Total votes		8,852	100%
Democratic hold			

=== District 30 ===
Incumbent Republican Shannon Morris had represented the 30th District since 2018.

Delaware House of Representatives 30th district general election, 2022
Party	Candidate	Votes	%
Republican	Shannon Morris (incumbent)	5,996	90.15%
Libertarian	Justin Brant	655	9.85%
Total votes		6,651	100%
Republican hold			

=== District 31 ===
Incumbent Democrat Sean Lynn had represented the 31st District since 2014.

Delaware House of Representatives 3 1st district general election, 2022
Party	Candidate	Votes	%
Democratic	Sean Lynn (incumbent)	3,689	65.51%
Republican	Jason Stewart	1,942	34.49%
Total votes		5,631	100%
Democratic hold			

=== District 32 ===
Incumbent Democrat Andria Bennett had represented the 32nd District since 2012. Bennett did not seek re-election, and fellow Democrat Kerri Evelyn Harris won the open seat. Democratic primary

Delaware House of Representatives 32nd district Democratic primary election, 2022
Party	Candidate	Votes	%
Democratic	Kerri Evelyn Harris	725	64.56%
Democratic	Phil McGinnis	270	24.04%
Democratic	Lamont Pierce	76	6.77%
Democratic	Lavaughn McCutchen	52	4.63%
Total votes		1,123	100%

General election

Delaware House of Representatives 32nd district general election, 2022
Party	Candidate	Votes	%
Democratic	Kerri Evelyn Harris	2,691	57.97%
Republican	Cheryl Precourt	1,951	42.03%
Total votes		4,642	100%
Democratic hold			

=== District 33 ===
Incumbent Republican Charles Postles Jr. had represented the 33rd District since 2016.

Delaware House of Representatives 33rd district general election, 2022
Party	Candidate	Votes	%
Republican	Charles Postles Jr. (incumbent)	5,703	100%
Total votes		5,703	100%
Republican hold			

=== District 34 ===
Incumbent Republican Lyndon Yearick had represented the 34th District since 2014.

Delaware House of Representatives 34th district general election, 2022
Party	Candidate	Votes	%
Republican	Lyndon Yearick (incumbent)	4,950	59.88%
Democratic	Adewunmi Kuforiji	3,205	38.77%
Non-Partisan Delaware	William Mcvay	111	1.34%
Total votes		8,266	100%
Republican hold			

=== District 35 ===
Incumbent Republican Jesse Vanderwende had represented the 35th District since 2018.

Delaware House of Representatives 35th district general election, 2022
Party	Candidate	Votes	%
Republican	Jesse Vanderwende (incumbent)	5,738	100%
Total votes		5,738	100%
Republican hold			

=== District 36 ===
Incumbent Republican Bryan Shupe had represented the 36th District since 2018. Republican primary

Delaware House of Representatives 36th district Republican primary election, 2022
Party	Candidate	Votes	%
Republican	Bryan Shupe (incumbent)	1,394	68.81%
Republican	Patrick Smith	632	31.19%
Total votes		2,026	100%

General election

Delaware House of Representatives 36th district general election, 2022
Party	Candidate	Votes	%
Republican	Bryan Shupe (incumbent)	5,892	100%
Total votes		5,892	100%
Republican hold			

=== District 37 ===
Incumbent Republican Ruth Briggs King had represented the 37th District since January 2010.

Delaware House of Representatives 37th district general election, 2022
Party	Candidate	Votes	%
Republican	Ruth Briggs King (incumbent)	5,504	100%
Total votes		5,504	100%
Republican hold			

=== District 38 ===
Incumbent Republican Ronald Gray had represented the 38th District since 2012.

Delaware House of Representatives 38th district general election, 2022
Party	Candidate	Votes	%
Republican	Ronald Gray (incumbent)	10,576	100%
Total votes		10,576	100%
Republican hold			

=== District 39 ===
Incumbent Republican and Minority Leader Daniel Short had represented the 39th District since 2006.

Delaware House of Representatives 39th district general election, 2022
Party	Candidate	Votes	%
Republican	Daniel Short (incumbent)	4,343	70.49%
Democratic	Susan Clifford	1,818	29.51%
Total votes		6,161	100%
Republican hold			

=== District 40 ===
Incumbent Republican Timothy Dukes had represented the 40th District since 2012.

Delaware House of Representatives 40th district general election, 2022
Party	Candidate	Votes	%
Republican	Timothy Dukes (incumbent)	5,506	100%
Total votes		5,506	100%
Republican hold			

=== District 41 ===
Incumbent Republican Richard Collins had represented the 41st District since 2014.

Delaware House of Representatives 41st district general election, 2022
Party	Candidate	Votes	%
Republican	Richard Collins (incumbent)	6,629	86.12%
Non-Partisan Delaware	Joseph D. Dipasquale	1,068	13.88%
Total votes		7,697	100%
Republican hold			
