= Jeff Hilovsky =

American politician

Member of the Delaware House of Representatives from the 4th district
- Incumbent
- Assumed office November 8, 2022
- Preceded by: Charles Freel

Personal details
- Born: c. 1956
- Party: Republican
- Education: Grove City College; Illinois College of Optometry; USAF Air War College

Jeffrey Hilovsky (born c. 1956) is an American politician. He is a Republican member of the Delaware House of Representatives, representing District 4.

== Biography ==
Hilovsky was born in c. 1956 and grew up in Long Neck, Delaware. He first attended Grove City College, where he received a bachelor's degree in biology, and later earned a doctorate from the Illinois College of Optometry. He also attended USAF Air War College and later served over 25 years in the military as a colonel and medical commander in the United States Air Force, being a member of the 512th Air Wing at the Dover Air Force Base. His military service includes the Gulf War, Iraq War, and War in Afghanistan.

Hilovsky is the founder and was for years the owner of the Sussex Eye Center, which has four locations in Sussex County. He also served as the president of the Delaware Board of Examiners in Optometry, president of the Delaware Optometric Association, medical director at Vision Source, and was appointed to the National Board of Examiners in Optometry. Hilovsky was an adjunct clinical professor at Salus University and the University of Missouri, and founded the "Leadership is a Lifestyle" program, which is taught at Sussex Central High School, Cape Henlopen High School and Delmar High School. He was a member of the "Easterseals Sussex County Advisory Board" for 23 years and served with the "Lions Club" for 25 years.

On June 14, 2022, Hilovsky filed to run in the Delaware House of Representatives election for the 4th district. A Republican, he faced Bradley Layfield in the primary and won with 60.5% of the vote. In the general election, he faced off against schoolteacher Keegan Worley, a Democrat, and business owner Amy Fresh, an Independent, and won with 57.3% of the vote.

Hilovsky is married and has three children, as well as several grandchildren.

== Electoral history ==
2022 Delaware's 4th house district Republican primary
Party	Candidate	Votes	%
Republican	Jeff Hilovsky	1,220	60.5
Republican	Bradley Layfield	796	39.5
Total votes		2,016	100.0

2022 Delaware's 4th house district
Party	Candidate	Votes	%
Republican	Jeff Hilovsky	6,661	57.3
Democratic	Keegan Worley	4,609	39.7
Independent Party	Amy Fresh	350	3.0
Total votes		11,620	100.0

Delaware House of Representatives 4th district general election, 2024
Party	Candidate	Votes	%
Republican	Jeff Hilovsky (incumbent)	10,533	57.99%
Democratic	Gregg Lindner	7,630	42.01%
Total votes		18,163	100%
Republican hold			
