= State University of New York Student Assembly =

Student Government in the SUNY System

SUNY Student Assembly
- Established: April 25, 1973; 53 years ago
- Headquarters: SUNY Plaza
- President: Luca O. Rallis, (Stony Brook University)
- Website: SUNY SA Website

The Student Assembly of the State University of New York, commonly referred to as the SUNY Student Assembly (SUNY SA), is the university-wide student government for the 64 institutions of the State University of New York (SUNY). It is empowered by Article XVII of the policies of the SUNY Board of Trustees to represent student concerns, elect the student member of the Board, and to act as a communications network between campus student leaders. The President of SUNY SA also serves as a voting member of the Boards of Trustees of both the State University of New York (SUNY) and the Higher Education Services Corporation (HESC).

== Organization ==
SUNY Student Assembly consists of the assembly, the Executive Board, the President's Cabinet, Executive Committee and the General Assembly which is chaired by the Parliamentarian. The assembly consists of representatives from each campus, the President as Chair and standing committee delegates. The Executive Board consists of the elected officers. The President's Cabinet consists of a Chief of Staff, Parliamentarian, Executive Director's that oversee a "student voices team", "public relations team", and a "policy team." Each of these Executive Directors have a staff of deputy directors that carry out various tasks that correspond with their respective roles. The Executive Committee consists of the officers, elected representatives, and standing committee delegates. Lastly, the General Assembly consists of about 300 voting delegates that represent the 3 million students of the State University of New York vis a vis their respect campus student government organization across the 64 campuses.

=== Parliamentarian ===
The Parliamentarian of the SUNY Student Assembly serves as the presiding officer for official business meetings of the General Assembly and Executive Committee, in accordance with the Assembly’s Bylaws. The Parliamentarian is responsible for advising the body on matters of parliamentary procedure, ensuring compliance with Article XVII of the SUNY Board of Trustees Policies and the Assembly’s governing documents, and maintaining procedural integrity during debate, voting, and elections.

The Parliamentarian also chairs the Rules Committee, which reviews resolutions for compliance with governing authority and adjudicates procedural and election-related disputes. In this role, the Parliamentarian functions as the chief procedural officer of the Assembly, safeguarding due process and neutrality in its proceedings.

Parliamentarian 2025-2026: Ameera Aftab

Past Parliamentarian:

2024-2025: Kisho Mcdonald 2023-2024: Kisho Mcdonald 2022-2023: Chance Fiorisi 2021-2022: Sowad Ocean Karim 2019-2020:Chester Bennett 2018-2019:Chester Bennett

=== Executive Board ===
The Executive Board consists of the President, Vice President, Treasurer, and Secretary. The duties of each are prescribed by Article XVII and the organization's bylaws

The executive board for the 2025-2026 academic year consists of Luca Rallis as President, Sophie Coker as Vice President, Oghenetega (Tega) Adjoh as Treasurer, and Dakota Richter as Secretary.

The executive board for the 2024-2025 academic year consisted of Giovanni Harvey as President, Jae Fish as Vice President, Oghenetega (Tega) Adjoh as Treasurer, and Lotus Taylor as Secretary.

The executive board for the 2023 - 2024 academic year consisted of Alexander Ruiz as President, Jae Fish as Vice President, Enid Walker as Treasurer and Jalen Miller as Secretary.

=== Executive committee ===
The Executive Committee is made up of three divisions, that come together to act on behalf of the assembly. These divisions consist of the Executive Board, the elected representatives from the student body at large and nonvoting representatives from standing committees.

==== Elected Representatives ====
The Student Assembly is composed of student Representatives from across the University who are elected by their peers from the 64 campuses of SUNY. They divided into sectors, based on the type of institution with in the SUNY system. The Representatives for the 2023-2024 academic year are as follows:

Community Colleges	University Colleges	Doctoral Granting Institutions - Undergraduate	Doctoral Granting Institutions - Graduate	University Colleges Agriculture/Technology and Statutory Colleges
Joseph Leichtner	Lily Wegerski	Luca Cassidy	Nicholas Brennan	Lily Holmes
Shalom Bloodman (Genesee)	Joseph Byrne (Hudson Valley)	Ayaka Hibino (Genesee)	Crystal Robertson-Hicks (Erie)	Angelo Romero (Monroe)
Lotus Taylor	Oghenetega Adjoh	Sujith Yella		
Crystal Robinson-Hicks				
Isaiah Jones				
Lisbeth Castellanos				

== Voting rights on the Board of Trustees ==
In the 1970s, students pressed for voting representation on the governing board of SUNY colleges. In 1971, the State Legislature added five student voting members to Cornell's Board of Trustees. However, at that time, all members of a board must be over the age of 21 for a corporation to hold a liquor license, so to allow Cornell to retain its license, the legislature had to go back to amend NYS Alcoholic Beverage Control Law § 126(4) to require that half the board must be 21. In 1975, the legislature added a non-voting student seat to the boards of all SUNY units. Two Attorney General of the State of New York opinion letters^{[42]} reduced the parliamentary rights of the student members to participate at meetings and indicated that they were not in fact Public Officers, and arguably subject to personal liability from lawsuits. In 1977, another statutory amendment made student members of SUNY councils and boards subject to the NYS Public Officers Law or NYS General Municipal Law and granted student representatives parliamentary powers of moving or seconding motions and of placing items on the agendas of the bodies. Finally, the legislature gave full voting rights to the student members in 1979, resulting in the students of all SUNY units having voting representatives, except for the NYS College of Environmental Science and Forestry. Finally, in 1986, the legislature gave the student representative of that college voting rights as well.

== General Reference ==
- Student Association of the State University of New York Records, 1969-1985. M.E. Grenander Department of Special Collections and Archives, University Libraries, University at Albany, State University of New York (hereafter referred to as the SASU Records).
