= State University of New York College of Optometry =

School of optometry in New York City

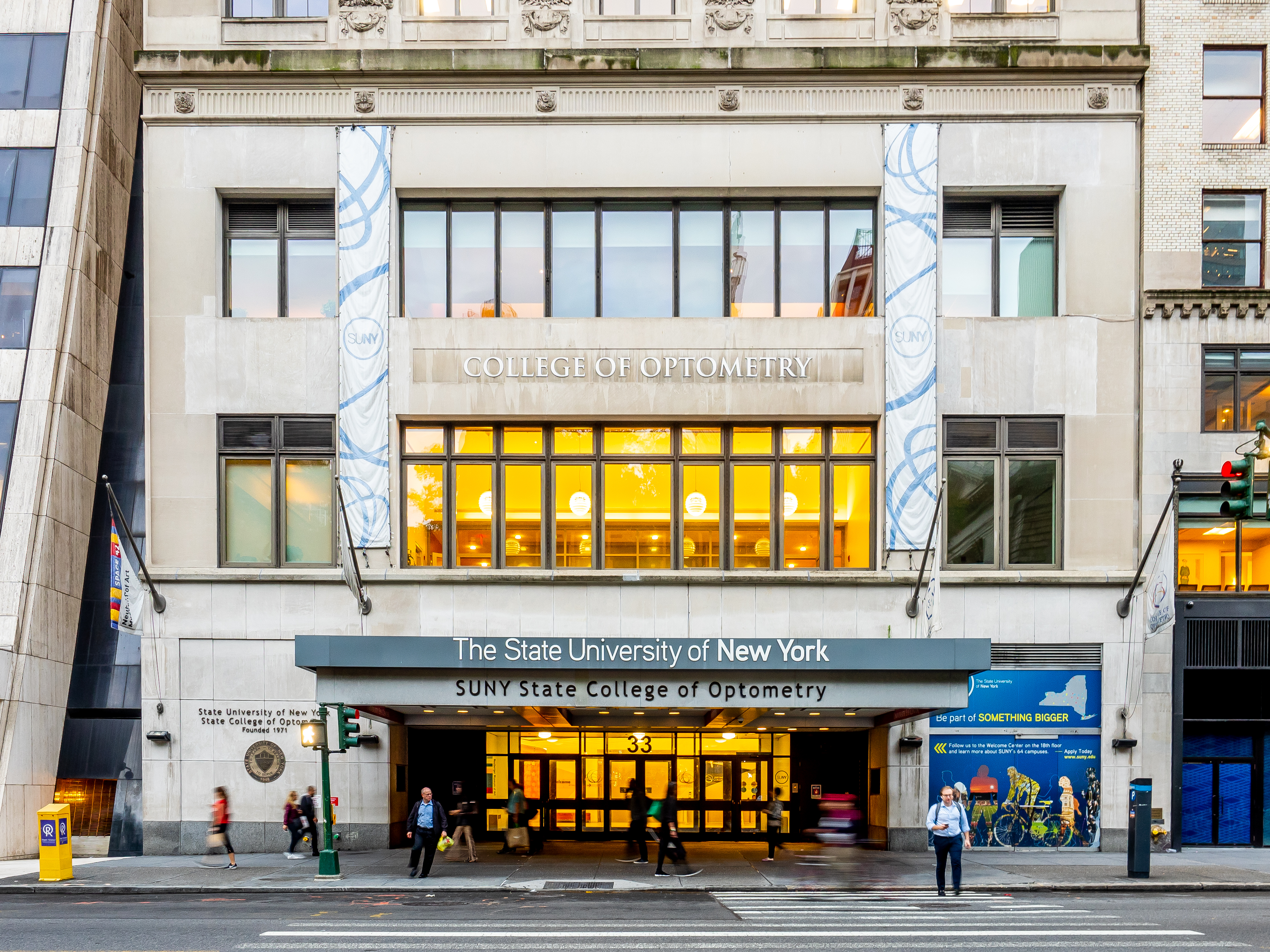
- Former name: Columbia University School of Optometry
- Type: Public school of optometry
- Established: 1971; 55 years ago
- Parent institution: State University of New York
- President: Dr. David Troilo, PhD
- Dean: Dr. Melissa Trego, OD, PhD
- Students: 388 (fall 2025)
- Location: 33 W 42nd St, New York, New York, 10036, United States; 40.7544°N 73.9823°W
- Campus: 298,000 sqft
- Total Alumni: 3,950 (2024)
- Colors: Blue, Red, and Gold
- Website: www.sunyopt.edu

The State University of New York College of Optometry (SUNY Optometry) is a public school of optometry in New York City. SUNY Optometry is home to one of the largest optometric facilities in the nation, and is recognized as a global leader of excellence in optometric education and vision research.

The college was established in 1971 by Governor Nelson Rockefeller and is part of the State University of New York System, the largest comprehensive university system in the United States. SUNY Optometry is the only school of optometry in the New York tri-state area, and the only optometry school within 100 miles of America's most populous city, New York.

== History ==
SUNY Optometry began in 1910 as the Columbia University School of Optometry, which was the first university-based optometry program in the United States. At the time, optometry was mainly eyewear sales and not a true medical profession. By 1928, the New York State saw the benefit of Columbia's program and passed a bill allowing only graduates of a university-affiliated school of optometry to qualify for the state board exam. This set the stage for nationwide recognition of optometry as a true medical profession.

In 1956, Columbia's optometry program shuttered due to not wanting to advance their current bachelor's and master's degrees into a Doctor of Optometry degree, as many other institutions had done at that time. This closure left a void in New York and the entire region, and as a response, a group of Columbia optometrists and philanthropists came together to form the nonprofit, the Optometric Center of New York (OCNY) in 1956. OCNY served as an eye care clinic and continuing optometric education center after the optometry program at Columbia closed.

After over a decade of lobbying by OCNY, Governor Nelson Rockefeller signed a bill on April 14, 1971, that officially established the State University of New York College of Optometry. Dr. Alden Haffner became the founding president. While graduates of the Columbia University School of Optometry had their degrees conferred by Columbia University, they are considered alumni of both Columbia and SUNY Optometry.

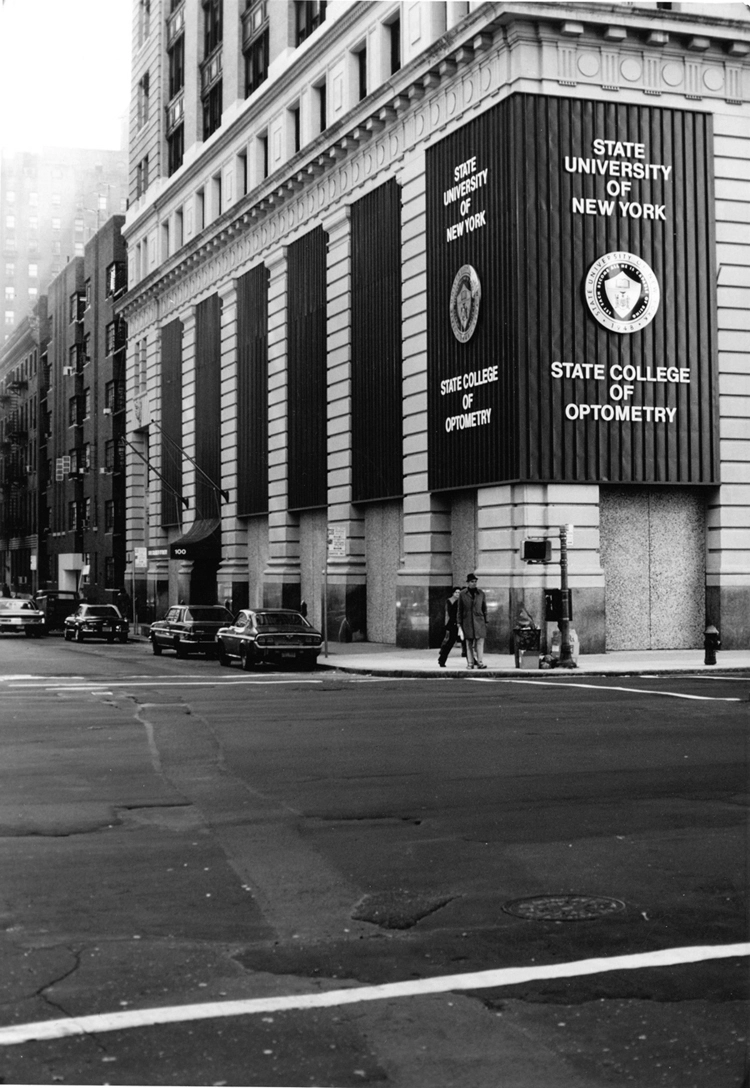
SUNY Optometry's former campus building at 100 East 24th Street in the 1970s

In 1972, SUNY Optometry moved into 122 East 25th St. where the OCNY has been operating a clinic for many years. That year, the college took over OCNY's educational, clinical, and vision research programs, firmly establishing itself as a major hub for vision science and education.

In 1974, the college established an in-house vision therapy residency. This was the first optometric residency program in the country and the third to receive accreditation status. In 2003, the name of the program was changed to the Dr. Irwin B. Suchoff Residency Program in Vision Therapy and Rehabilitation to honor Dr. Suchoff who was the program's first residency supervisor in 1975 and the nation's first Director of Residency Education.

In 1975, the inaugural class of SUNY Optometry graduated, with 17 students receiving their degrees.

As the college continued to expand, the need for more space became apparent. In 1976, the college moved to 100 E 24th St. where it would remain until 1999.

In 1999, the college moved to its current campus across from Bryant Park in what was originally the Aeolian Building, which was built in 1912 for the Aeolian Company, a piano manufacturer. The building is where music composer George Gershwin debuted one of his most famous works, Rhapsody in Blue, on February 12, 1924. SUNY Optometry commemorated the 100th anniversary of Rhapsody in Blue with a special performance of the work on February 12, 2024.

In 2024, the Optometric Center of New York (OCNY) was renamed The SUNY College of Optometry Foundation to better align with the organization's mission of support eye care, vision research, and optometric education though the work of SUNY Optometry and the University Eye Center.

In 2027, the College will open a new campus in Syracuse, NY as part of their Doctor of Optometry program. The campus will be located on the SUNY Upstate Medical campus. The College will enroll 16 students in its inaugural year.

== Academics ==
The State University of New York College of Optometry is authorized to operate by the Board of Regents of the University of the State of New York. The college is regionally accredited by the Middle States Commission on Higher Education (MSCHE). Its professional and residency education programs are accredited by the Accreditation Council on Optometric Education.

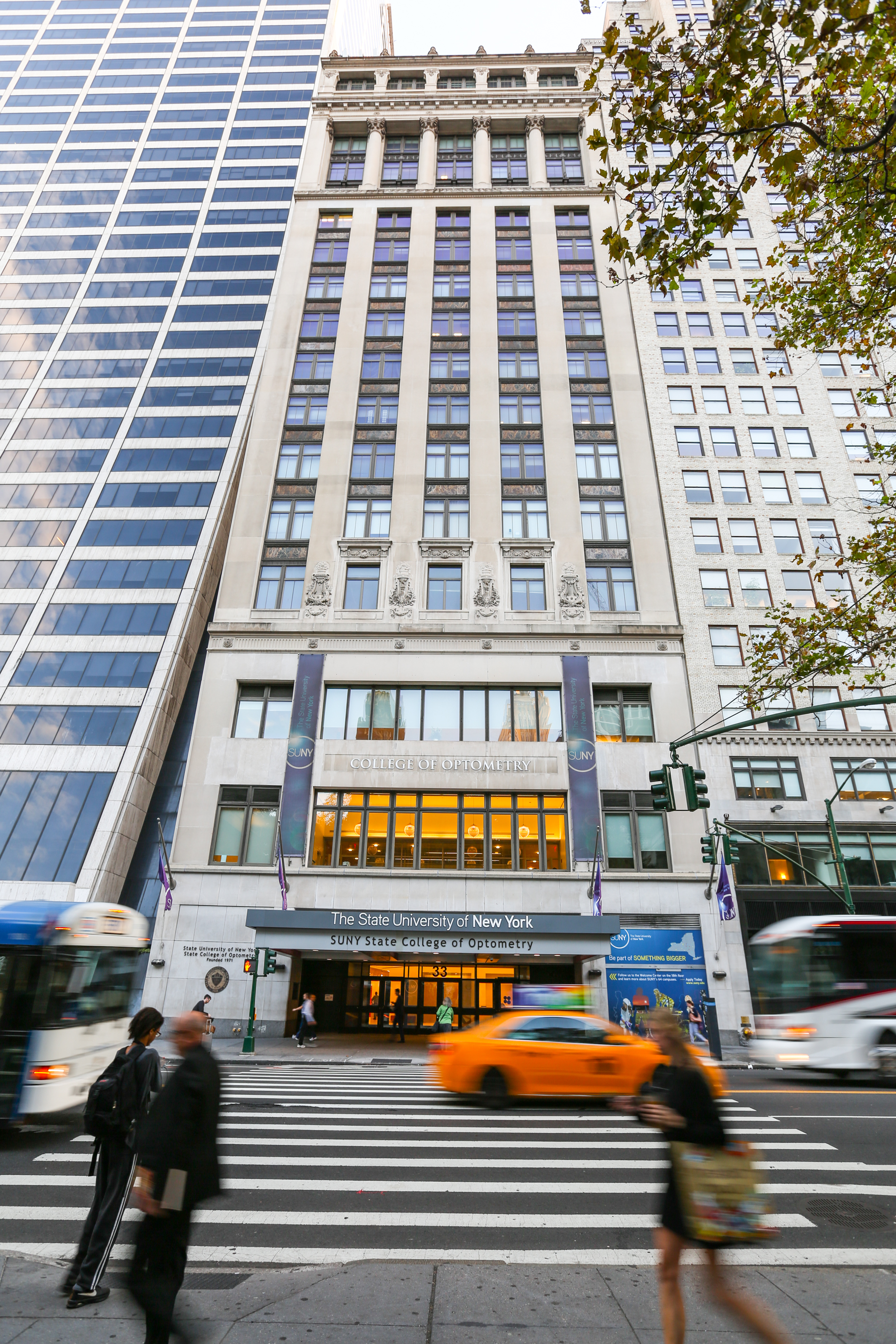
SUNY Optometry's current campus in the former Aeolian Building across from Bryant Park in Midtown Manhattan.

As of 2024, there were 409 postgraduate students and 41 residents enrolled. The college is known for its rigorous academic and clinical training, requiring each student to complete more than 2,400 hours of clinical experience. Reflecting these high standards, over 97% of students pass all three parts of the national board exams before graduation. Specifically, SUNY students achieved a 94% first-time pass rate on Part 1, 100% on Part 2, and 99% on Part 3. Over the past five years, an average of 95% of students passed their licensing exam on the first attempt, well above the national average.

The college grants a professional degree, the Doctor of Optometry (O.D.), and two academic degrees, the Master of Science (M.S.) in Vision Science and the Doctor of Philosophy (Ph.D.) in Vision Science. Continuing education courses for practicing optometrists are also provided by the college.

An MBA in business management or healthcare leadership is available through a joint program with SUNY Empire State University. This program is open to students enrolled in the O.D. program and graduated O.D.s.

The college offers residencies to optometrists from around the world through 16 clinical residency programs including specializations in cornea and contact lenses, ocular disease, primary care optometry, pediatric optometry and vision rehabilitation.

Research and graduate programs at the college are administered through the Graduate Center for Vision Research, or CVRC. In 2024, SUNY Optometry ranked second nationally among all schools and colleges of optometry in total annual research funds awarded at $5.2 million. The college currently holds 47 active grants with a cumulative total of $14 million. Current research at the college includes molecular and cellular biology, genetics, ocular structure and function, visual neuroscience, eye movements, neural plasticity, visual psychophysics, eye development, neuroprotection, accommodation and refractive error, and models of ocular pathology.

The University Eye Center (UEC) is the patient-care facility of the State University of New York College of Optometry and is one of the largest eye-and-vision care clinics in the country examining more than 60,000 patients annually and over 240,000 patient encounters. The UEC provides eye care, corrective lenses, and vision therapy to the public.
