= Charles Freel =

American politician

Charles M. Freel

Member of the Delaware House of Representatives from the 4th district
- In office March 5, 2022 – November 8, 2022
- Preceded by: Gerald Brady
- Succeeded by: Jeff Hilovsky (redistricting)

Personal details
- Party: Democratic
- Children: 2

Charles M. Freel, often known as Bud, is an American politician who served as a member of the Delaware House of Representatives from the 4th district in 2022. He previously served on the Wilmington City Council. He is a member of the Democratic Party.

== Education ==
Charles M. Freel attended Salesianum School and the University of Delaware.

== Political career ==
Freel served on the Wilmington City Council for 24 years, starting in 1997: first as an at-large member for 16 years, then representing the 8th council district for 8 years. Freel also worked at the Delaware Department of Transportation. He retired from both positions in 2020.

Freel was selected by the Delaware Democratic Party to run in a March 5, 2022, special election to fill the 4th district in the Delaware House of Representatives for the remainder of Gerald Brady's term, who had resigned after being diagnosed with PTSD. He defeated Republican candidate Ted Kittila, a lawyer who had previously run for attorney general in 2014. Freel did not seek reelection in the 2022 Delaware House of Representatives election, which was held using new districts.

== Personal life ==
Freel has two daughters.

== Electoral history ==
2022 Delaware's 4th House of Representatives district special election
Party	Candidate	Votes	%
Democratic	Charles "Bud" Freel	2,210	68.42
Republican	Theodore "Ted" A. Kittila	1,015	31.42
Write-in		5	0.15
Total votes		3,230	100.0
