= 2022 Delaware elections =

The following elections were scheduled for 2022 in the U.S. state of Delaware.

- 2022 Delaware Senate election
- 2022 Delaware House of Representatives election
- 2022 Delaware Auditor of Accounts election
- 2022 Delaware Attorney General election
- 2022 Delaware State Treasurer election
- 2022 United States House of Representatives election in Delaware

== Auditor of Accounts ==
2022 Delaware State Auditor election
- November 8, 2022
Nominee	Lydia York	Janice Lorrah
Party	Democratic	Republican
Popular vote	171,764	145,161
Percentage	54.2%	45.8%
- York: 60–70% Lorrah: 50–60%
State Auditor before election
Dennis Greenhouse
Democratic
Elected State Auditor
Lydia York
Democratic

== See also ==
- 2022 United States elections
