= DeShanna Neal =

American politician

Member of the Delaware House of Representatives from the 13th district
- Incumbent
- Assumed office November 7, 2022
- Preceded by: John Mitchell Jr.

Personal details
- Born: October 29, 1981 (age 44) Wilmington, Delaware, US
- Party: Democratic
- Occupation: LGBTQ+ rights activist

DeShanna U. Neal is an American politician. They are a Democratic member of the Delaware House of Representatives, representing District 13. They are also the founder of the Intersections of Pride Foundation in Delaware.

== Early life and career ==
Their father was a Vietnam Vet while their mother was an office worker for over 30 years. Neal graduated from Concord High School in 2000, later getting a bachelors from the University of Phoenix and a master's degree from Wilmington University in 2021.

== Political career ==
Neal was elected to the Delaware House of Representatives in 2022 with 60.69% of the vote against Republican opponent, Carlucci Coehlo. They were later sworn in on November 7 of that year. They ran a progressive campaign that focused on mental health, environmentalism, and the legalization of cannabis.

== Personal life ==
Neal uses they/them pronouns and is a mother of 4 children, including two transgender daughters, Trinity and Hyperion, who is the subject of their book "My Rainbow". They are the co-organizer and creator of New Castle County's first ever LGBTQ Youth Pride Festival, as well as, Delaware's first Drag Queen Story Hour. They founded a non-profit organization on February 20, 2020.
