= State University of New York =

Public university system in New York state

- Motto: To learn, to search, to serve
- Type: Public university system
- Established: 1948; 78 years ago
- Endowment: $4.84 billion (2022)
- Budget: $13.37 billion (2022)
- Chairman: Merryl Tisch
- Chancellor: John King Jr.
- Vice-Chancellor: Robert Megna
- Provost: Tod Laursen
- Faculty: 29,427
- Students: 387,446 (fall 2025)
- Undergraduates: 339,800 (fall 2025)
- Postgraduates: 47,646 (fall 2025)
- Location: New York, United States
- Campus: 64 campuses
- Colors: Blue and Gray
- Website: www.suny.edu

The State University of New York (SUNY /ˈsuːni/ SOO-nee) is a system of public colleges and universities in the State of New York. Led by chancellor John B. King, the SUNY system has 87,956 employees, including 29,427 faculty members, and some 7,660 degree and certificate programs overall and a $13.37 billion budget.

With 25,000 acres of land, SUNY's largest campus is SUNY College of Environmental Science and Forestry, which neighbors the State University of New York Upstate Medical University—the largest employer in the SUNY system with over 10,959 employees. Its flagship universities are Stony Brook University on Long Island in southeastern New York and University at Buffalo in the west. Its research university centers also include Binghamton University and the University at Albany.

The State University of New York was established in 1948 by Governor Thomas E. Dewey, through legislative implementation of recommendations made by the Temporary Commission on the Need for a State University (1946–1948). The commission was chaired by Owen D. Young, who was at the time Chairman of General Electric. The system was greatly expanded during the administration of Governor Nelson A. Rockefeller, who took a personal interest in design and construction of new SUNY facilities across the state. Since 1978, its primary administrative offices have been located at SUNY Plaza in Albany with satellite offices in Manhattan and Washington, D.C.

Apart from units of the institutionally separate City University of New York (CUNY), SUNY comprises all New York state-supported institutions of higher education. In addition, SUNY has four contracted colleges/school (New York State College of Agriculture and Life Sciences at Cornell University, New York State College of Veterinary Medicine at Cornell University, New York State College of Human Ecology at Cornell University, and the New York State School of Industrial and Labor Relations at Cornell University) operating concurrently with Cornell University, and graduates from these four contracted colleges/school have alumni status from both institutions.

== History ==
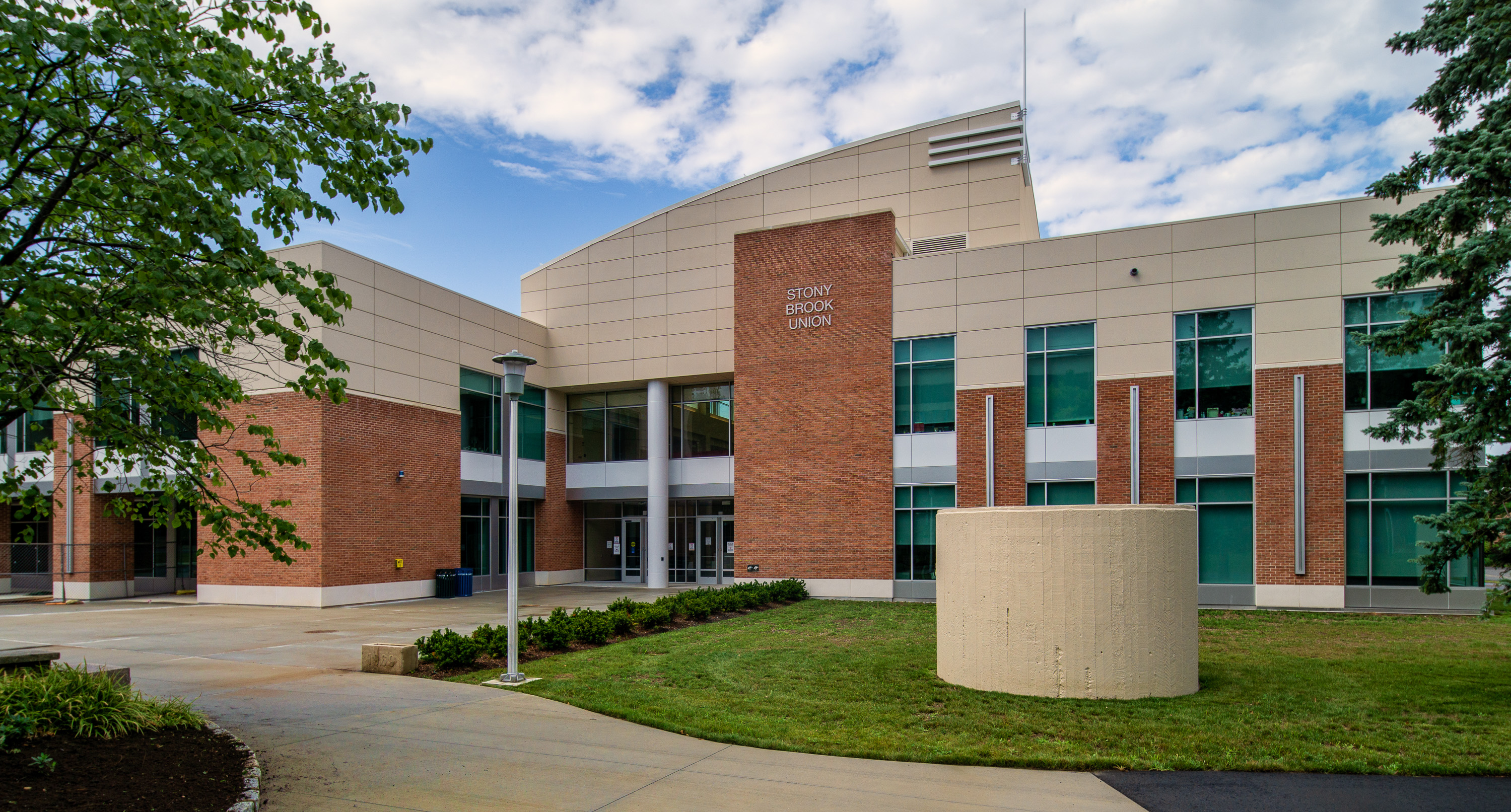
Stony Brook University on Long Island

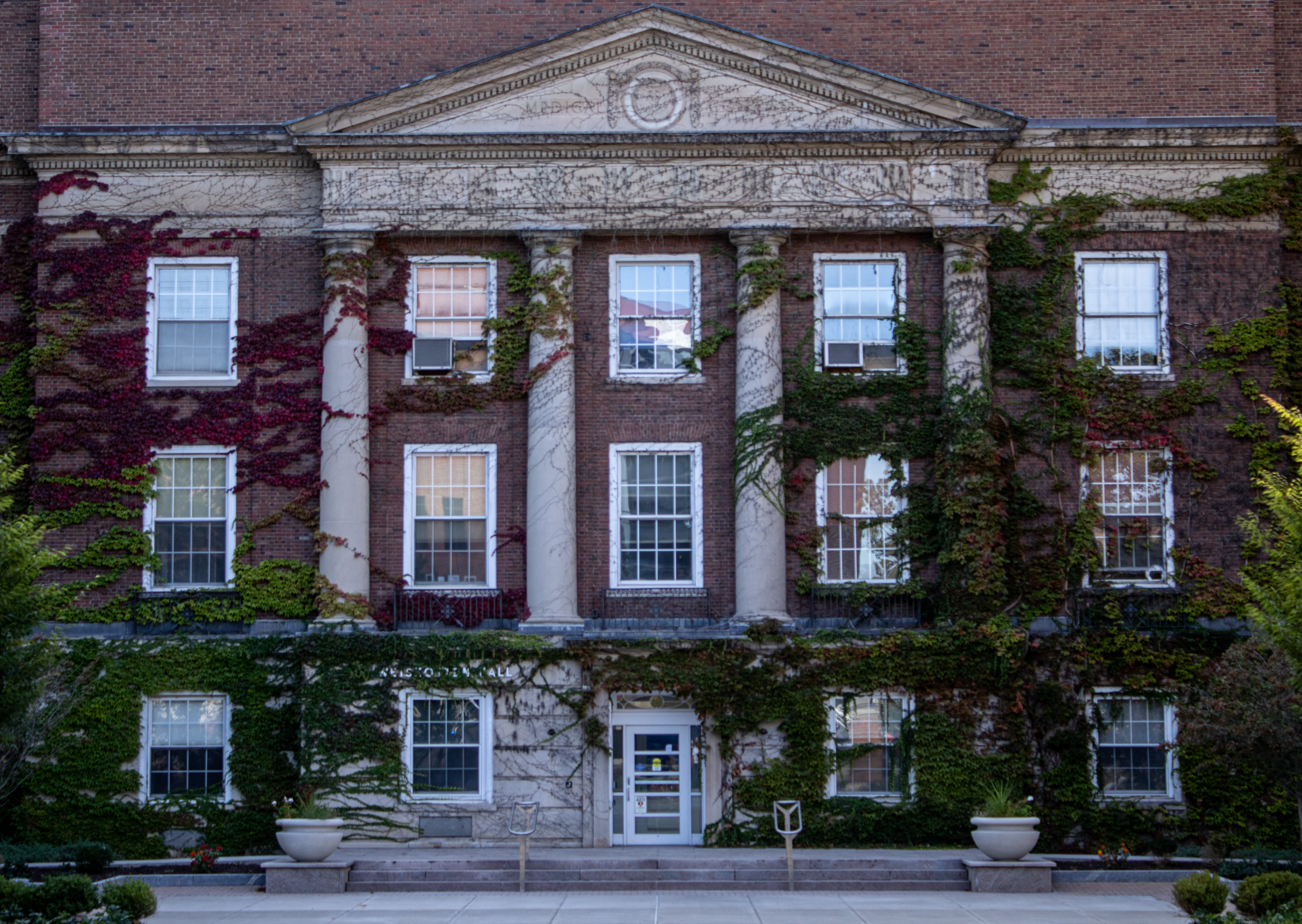
The State University of New York Upstate Medical University in Syracuse

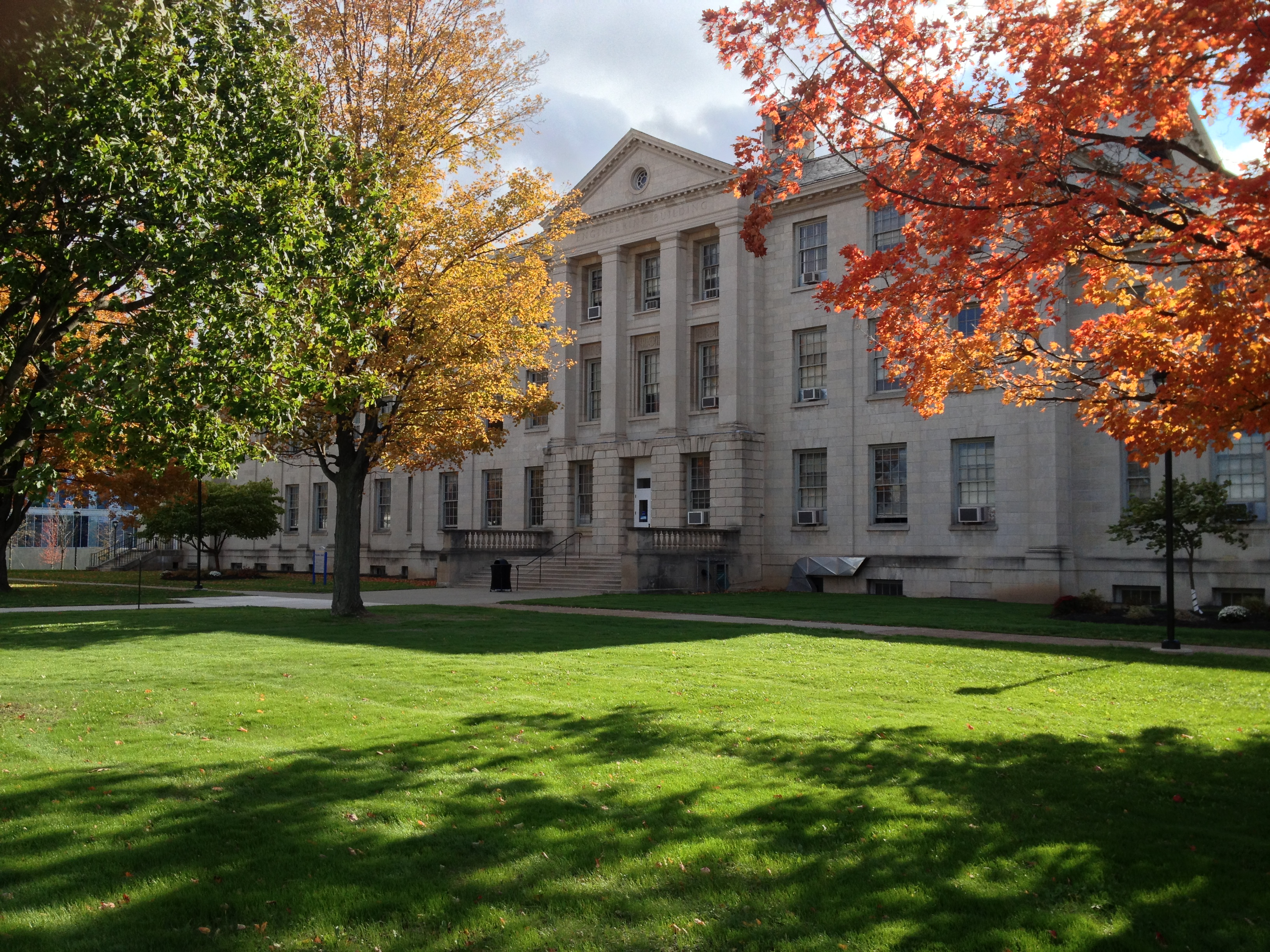
The University at Buffalo in Buffalo; the university also has a campus in Amherst

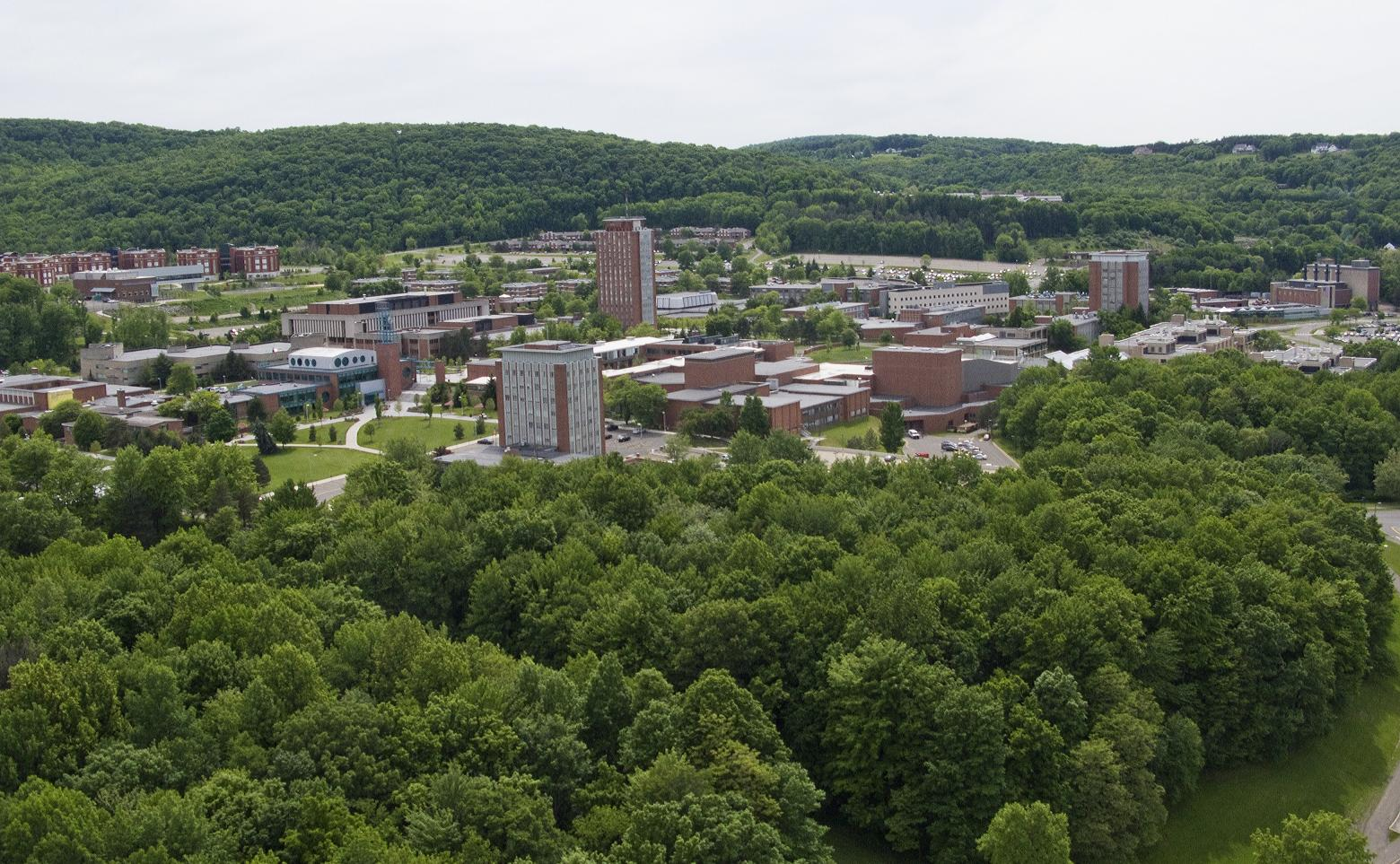
Binghamton University has campuses in Binghamton, Johnson City, and Vestal

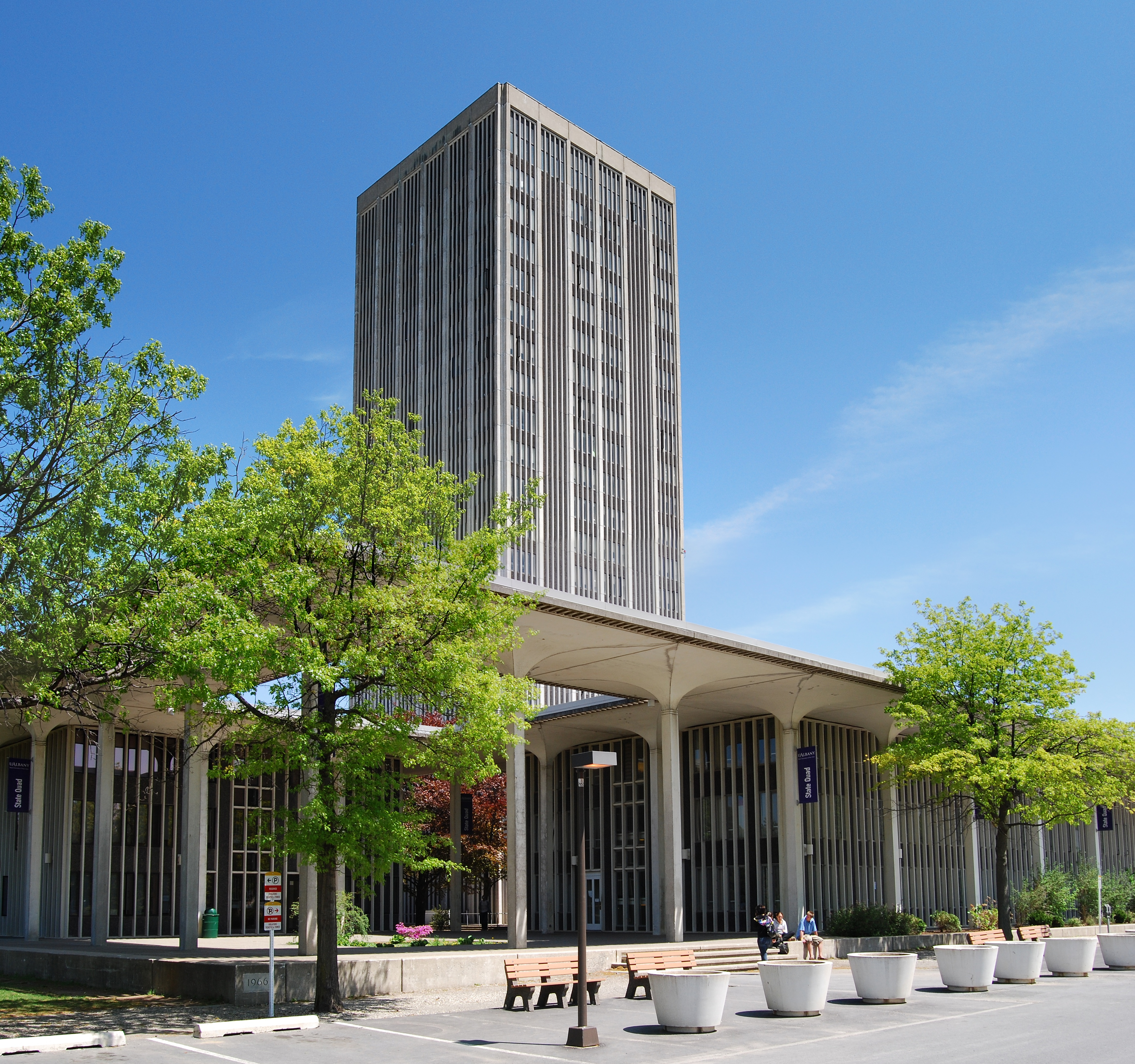
The University at Albany

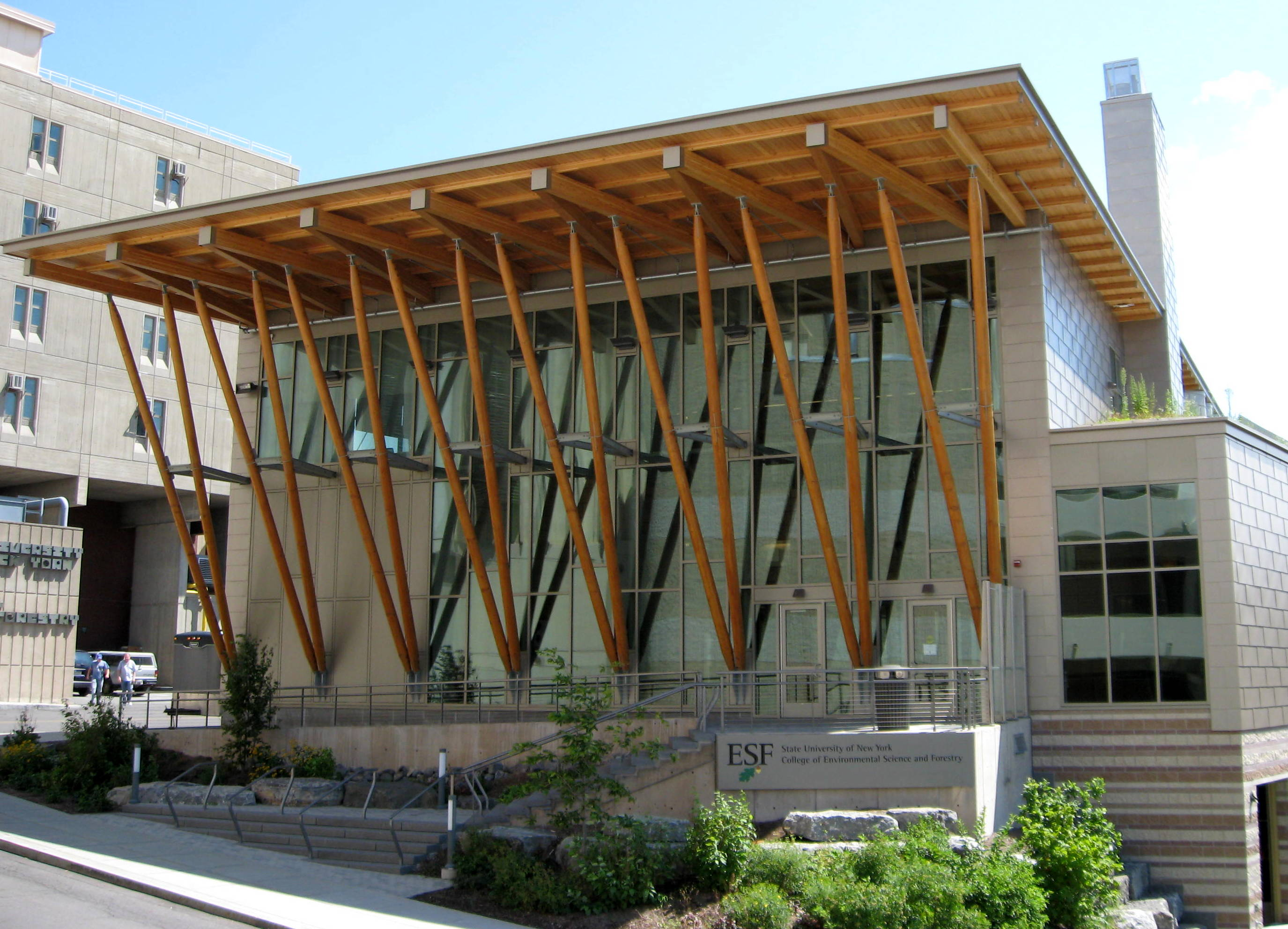
The College of Environmental Science and Forestry in Syracuse

New York was one of the last US states to set up a state college and university system. The first colleges were established privately, with some arising from local seminaries, and New York State had a long history of supporting higher education before the creation of the SUNY system. The oldest college that is part of the SUNY System is SUNY Potsdam, established in 1816 as the St. Lawrence Academy.

In 1835, the State Legislature acted to establish stronger programs for public school teacher preparation and designated one academy in each senatorial district to receive money for a special teacher-training department. St. Lawrence Academy received this distinction, and it later designated Potsdam as the site of the Normal School in 1867.

On May 7, 1844, the New York General Assembly voted to establish Normal School in Albany as the first college for teacher education. In 1865, the privately endowed Cornell University, one of eight Ivy League universities in the nation, was designated as New York's land grant college. In 1894, the state began direct financial support of four of Cornell's colleges.

Between 1889 and 1903, Cornell operated the New York State College of Forestry, until the governor vetoed its annual appropriation. The school was moved to Syracuse University in Syracuse in 1911, where it is now the State University of New York College of Environmental Science and Forestry. In 1908, the State legislature began the New York State College of Agriculture at Alfred University.

Between 1946 and 1948, the Temporary Commission on the Need for a State University, chaired by Owen D. Young, chairman of General Electric Company, studied New York's existing higher education institutions. It was known New York's private institutions of higher education were highly discriminatory and failed to provide for many New Yorkers. Noting this need, the commission recommended the creation of a public state university system. In 1948, legislation was passed establishing SUNY on the foundation of the teacher-training schools established in the 19th century. Most of them had already developed curricula similar to those found at four-year liberal arts schools long before the creation of SUNY, as evidenced by the fact they had become known as "Colleges for Teachers" rather than "Teachers' Colleges".

On October 8, 1953, SUNY took a historic step of banning all national fraternities and sororities from its 33 campuses, a ban that lasted until 1977. The resolution was passed as an attempt to combat discrimination based on race or religion in many national organizations at the time. Various fraternities challenged this rule in court since it did not distinguish between those with discriminatory clauses in their by-laws and those who did not. The SUNY resolution was upheld in court as being within a state's authority to supervise and control its educational institutions.

In 1986, L. Eudora Pettigrew became the first African-American college president in the SUNY system when she was named president of SUNY Old Westbury.

Despite being one of the last states in the nation to establish a state university, the system was quickly expanded during the chancellorship of Samuel B. Gould and the administration of Governor Nelson A. Rockefeller, who took a personal interest in the design and construction of new SUNY facilities across the state. Rockefeller championed the acquisition of the private University of Buffalo into the SUNY system, making the public State University of New York at Buffalo.

== Organization ==
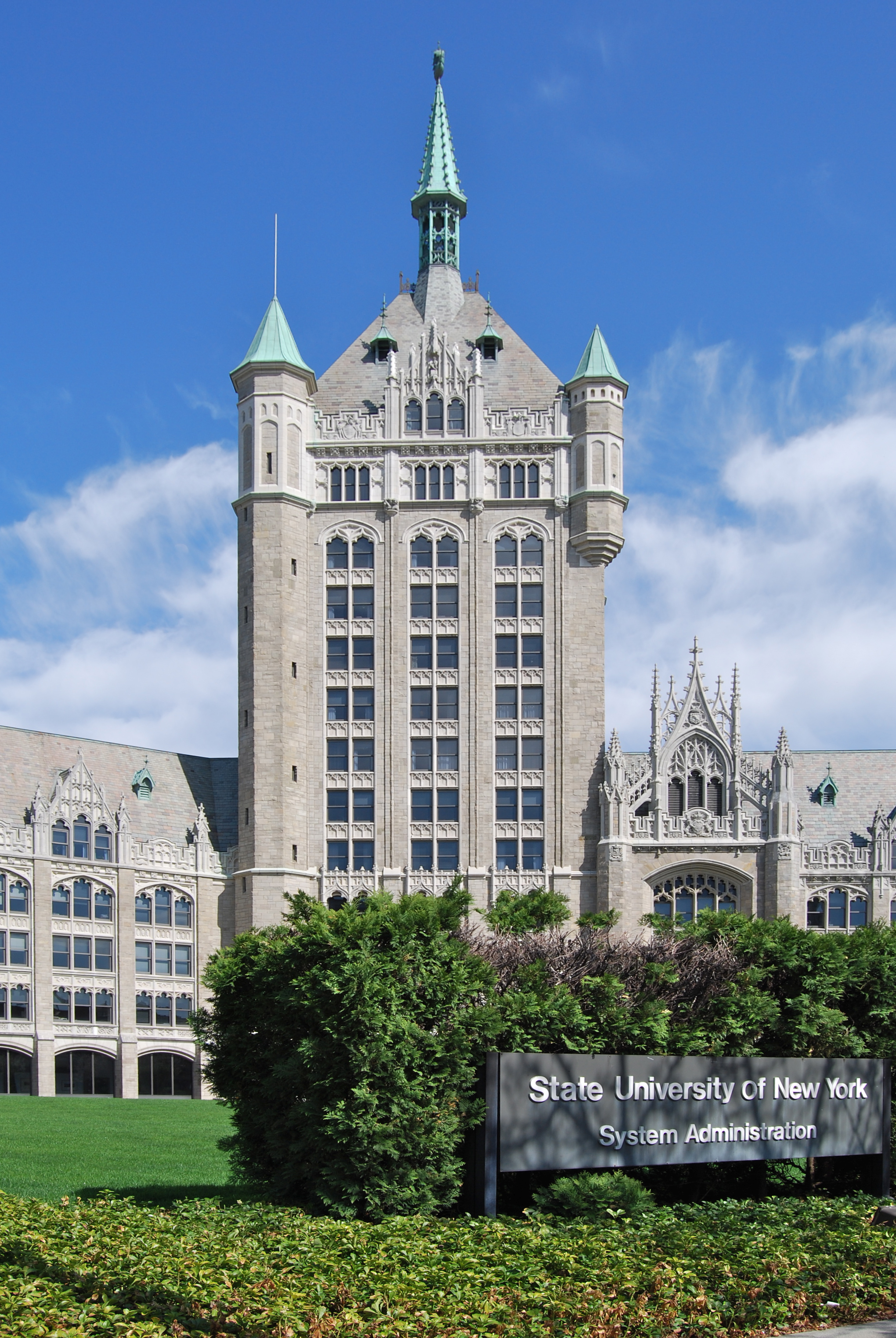
SUNY System Administration Building "The SUNY Castle" in Albany

SUNY is governed by the State University of New York Board of Trustees, which consists of eighteen members, fifteen of whom are appointed by the Governor, with consent of the New York State Senate. The sixteenth member is the president of The State University of New York Student Assembly. The last two members are the presidents of the University Faculty Senate and Faculty Council of Community Colleges, both of whom are non-voting. The board of trustees appoints the chancellor who serves as SUNY Chief Executive Officer.

The state of New York assists in financing the SUNY system, which, along with CUNY, provides lower-cost college-level education to residents of the state. SUNY students also come from out-of-state and 171 foreign countries, though tuition is higher for these students.

There is a large variety of colleges in the SUNY system with some overlap in specialties between sites. SUNY divides its campuses into four distinct categories: university centers/doctoral-granting institutions, comprehensive colleges, technology colleges, and community colleges. SUNY also includes statutory colleges, state-funded colleges within other institutions such as Cornell University and Alfred University. Students at the statutory colleges who are residents of New York state receive the benefit of state-subsidized tuition while enjoying all of the campus life amenities of the host institutions.

The Rockefeller Institute of Government is the public policy research arm.

The SUNY Charter Schools Institute was established by the Board of Trustees in 1999 to assist with their authority as one of New York's charter school authorizers. The Institute reviews applications, monitors academic and fiscal performance, and reports to the Trustees' Charter Schools Committee. It is based within SUNY System Administration but operates with administrative independence.

SUNY and the City University of New York (CUNY) are different university systems, both receiving funding from New York State. Also, SUNY is not to be confused with the University of the State of New York (USNY), which is the governmental umbrella organization for most education-related institutions and many education-related personnel (both public and private) in New York State, and which includes, as components, the New York State Education Department and the New York State University Police.

=== Student representation ===
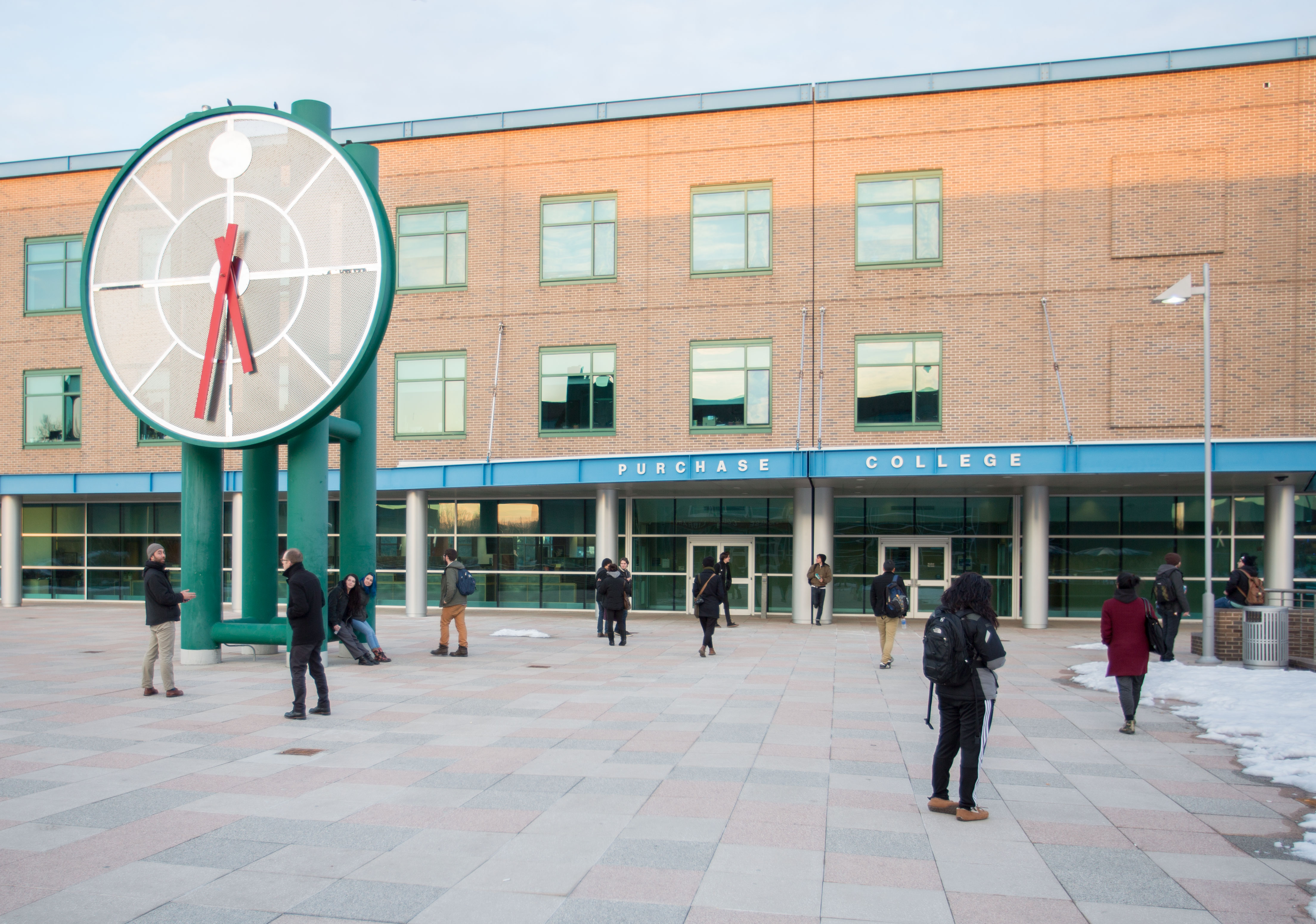
Purchase College in Purchase

The SUNY Board of Trustees has a voting student member on the board. The student trustee serves a dual role as the President of the Student Assembly of the State University of New York (SUNYSA). SUNYSA is the recognized student government of the SUNY system.

In the 1970s, students pressed for voting representation on the governing board of SUNY colleges. In 1971, the State Legislature added five student voting members to Cornell's board of trustees. However, at that time, all members of a board must be over the age of 21 for a corporation to hold a liquor license, so to allow Cornell to retain its license, the legislature had to go back to amend NYS Alcoholic Beverage Control Law § 126(4) to require half the board must be 21.

In 1975, the legislature added a non-voting student seat to the boards of all SUNY units. Two Attorney General of the State of New York opinion letters reduced the parliamentary rights of the student members to participate at meetings and indicated they were not in fact Public Officers, and arguably subject to personal liability from lawsuits. In 1977, another statutory amendment made student members of SUNY councils and boards subject to the NYS Public Officers Law or NYS General Municipal Law and granted student representatives parliamentary powers of moving or seconding motions and of placing items on the agendas of the bodies. Finally, the legislature gave full voting rights to the student members in 1979, resulting in the students of all SUNY units having voting representatives, except for the NYS College of Environmental Science and Forestry. Finally, in 1986, the legislature gave the student representative of that college voting rights as well.

=== Libraries ===
The SUNY Libraries Consortium (SLC) is an independent organization which supports its members, the libraries of SUNY.

== Campuses ==
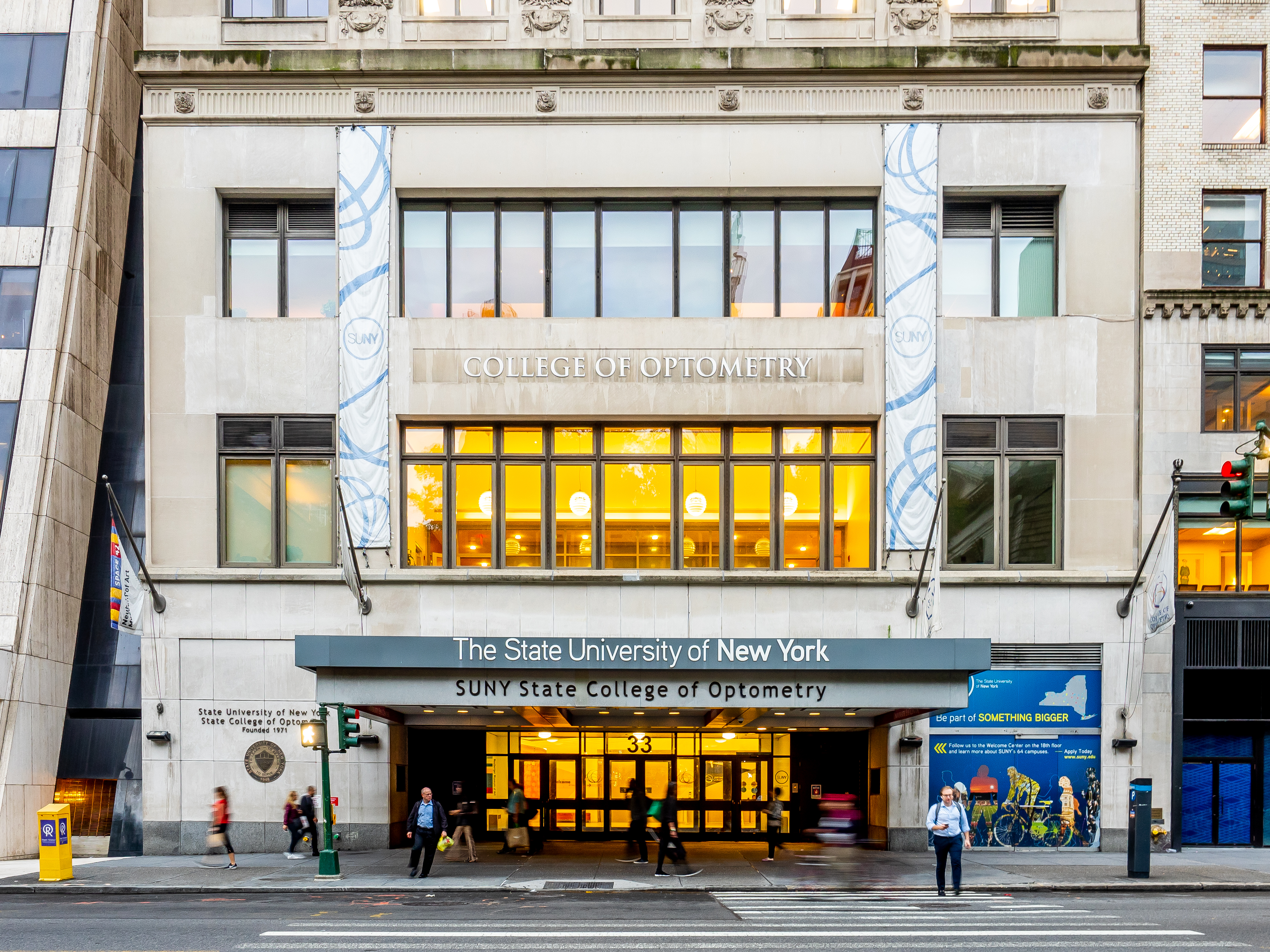
The College of Optometry in New York City

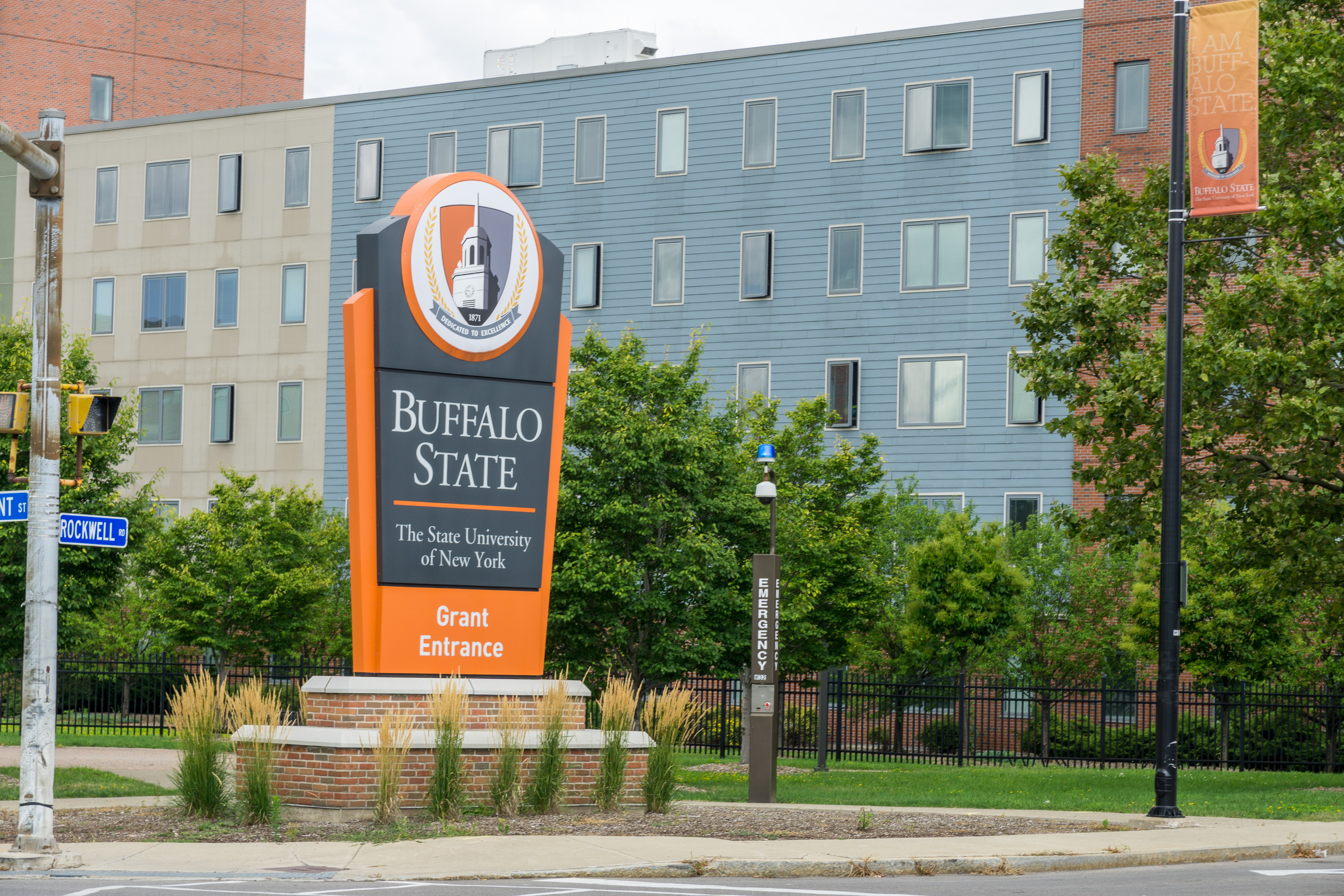
Buffalo State University

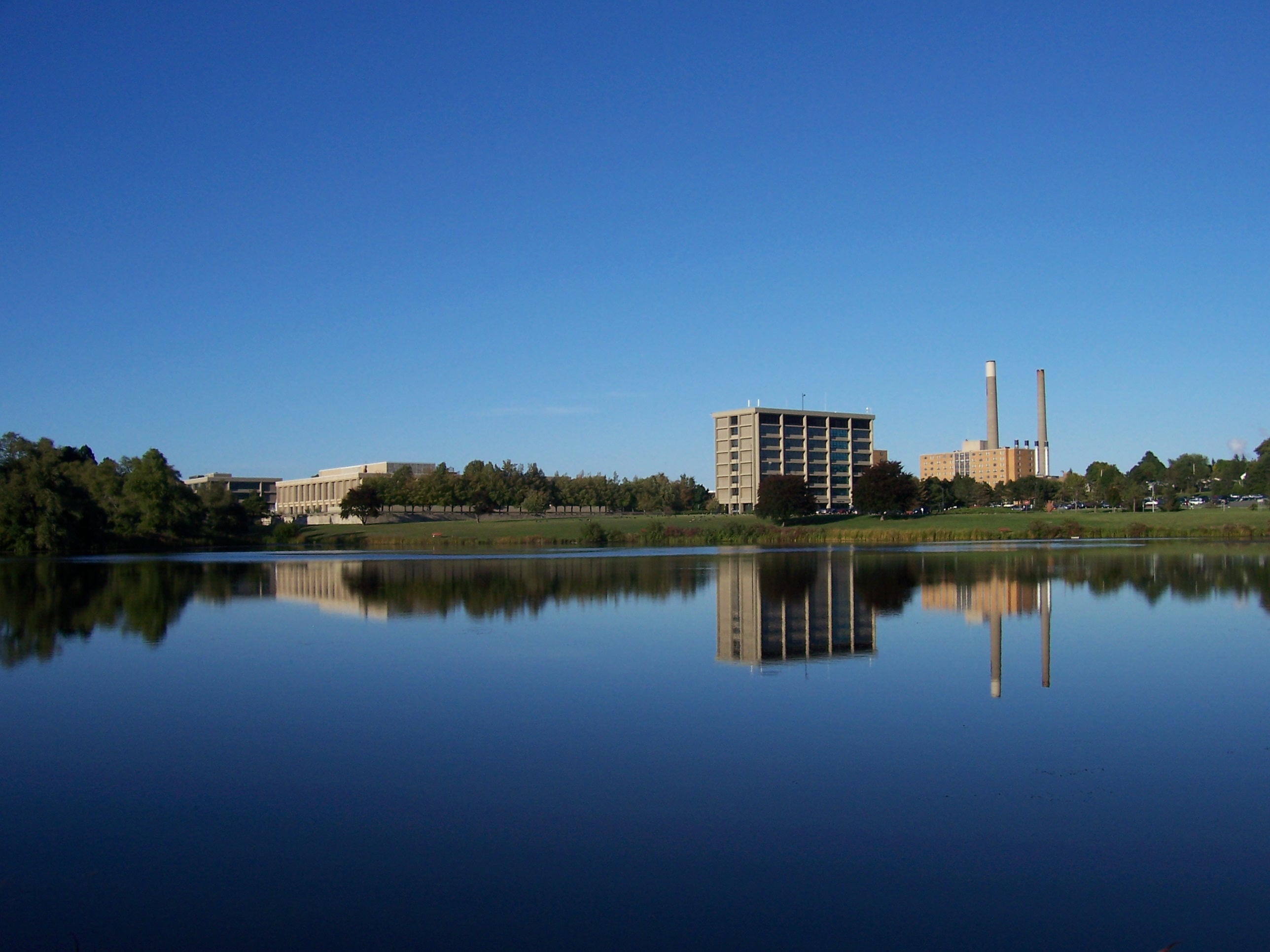
SUNY Oswego

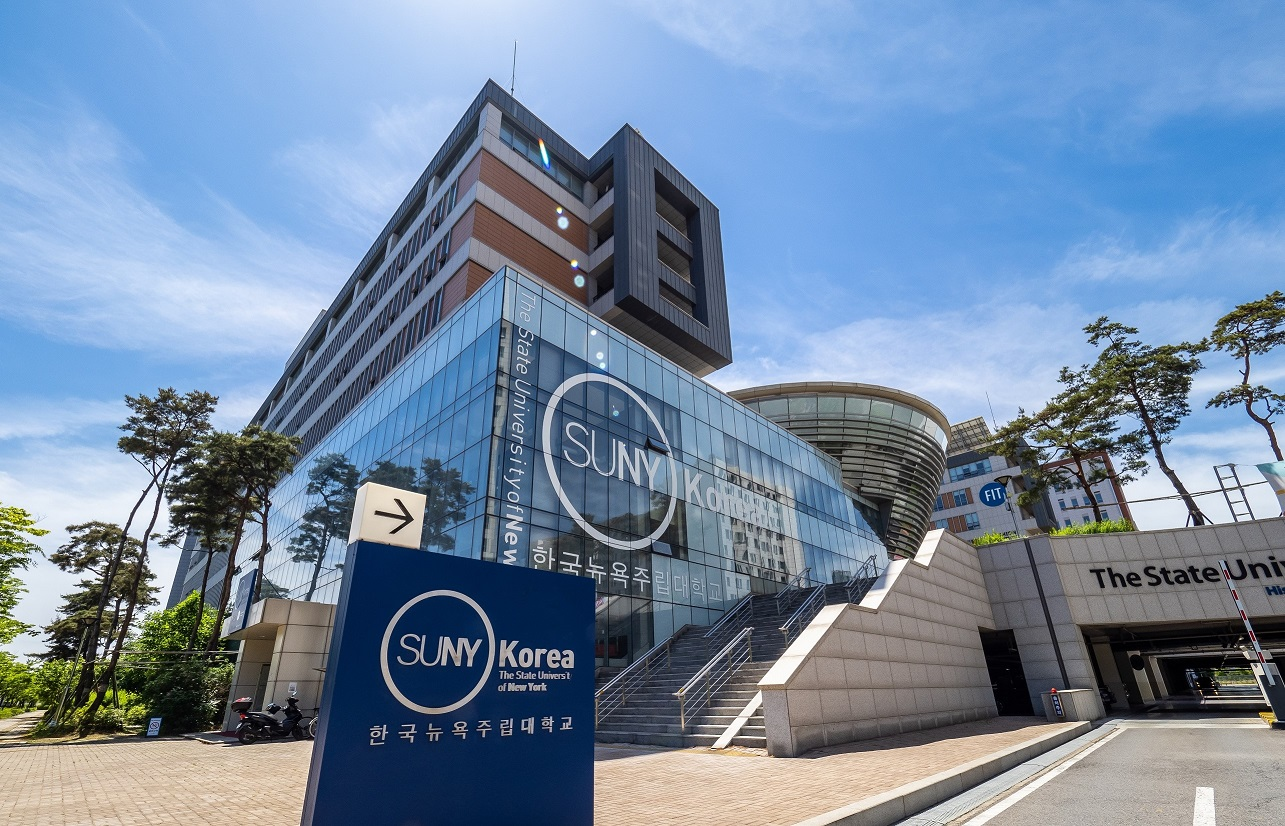
SUNY Korea

All SUNY colleges are in New York State, except for one extension center of Jamestown Community College and SUNY Korea.

Jamestown Community College operates its Warren Center in Pennsylvania under a contract with the Warren-Forest Higher Education Council and the center is licensed by the Pennsylvania Department of Education. The Warren Center is 25 miles south of Jamestown, New York on the grounds of Warren State Hospital, in North Warren, Pennsylvania.

For international collaboration, SUNY Korea was opened by the government of South Korea in Incheon, South Korea in 2012, in conjunction with SUNY. As of 2023, it offers undergraduate and graduate programs, with faculty from Stony Brook University and the Fashion Institute of Technology.

SUNY Educational Opportunity Centers (EOCs) tuition-free training centers across New York State that provide academic, vocational, and workforce development programs to eligible adults. They offer high school equivalency prep, English as a Second Language (ESL), college prep, and vocational certifications to help residents achieve financial self-sufficiency. They are part of SUNY University Center for Academic and Workforce Development (UCAWD).

Through SUNY Online, certain programs which are hosted at all 64 SUNY campuses are offered fully online or hybrid.

Additionally, SUNY has four medical schools, two dental schools, one law school, a maritime school, and SUNY Optometry, New York state's only college of optometry.

=== Flagships ===
- Stony Brook University
- University at Buffalo

=== University centers ===
- Binghamton University
- University at Albany

=== Other doctoral/research ===
- Upstate Medical University
- Downstate Health Sciences University
- College of Environmental Science and Forestry
- College of Optometry
- Polytechnic Institute
- One statutory college at Alfred University:
  - New York State College of Ceramics
- Four statutory colleges at Cornell University:
  - College of Agriculture and Life Sciences (CALS), which includes the New York State Agricultural Experiment Station in Geneva
  - College of Human Ecology
  - College of Veterinary Medicine
  - School of Industrial and Labor Relations

=== Comprehensive colleges ===
- Buffalo State University
- Empire State University
- SUNY Purchase
- SUNY Geneseo
- SUNY Oswego
- SUNY Potsdam
- SUNY Cortland
- SUNY Oneonta
- SUNY Fredonia
- SUNY New Paltz
- SUNY Plattsburgh
- SUNY Brockport
- SUNY Old Westbury

=== Technology colleges ===
- Alfred State College
- Farmingdale State College
- SUNY Morrisville
- SUNY Canton
- SUNY Cobleskill
- SUNY Delhi
- SUNY Maritime College

=== Community colleges ===
- SUNY Adirondack
- SUNY Broome Community College
- Cayuga Community College
- Clinton Community College
- Columbia-Greene Community College
- Corning Community College
- Dutchess Community College
- SUNY Erie
- Fashion Institute of Technology
- Finger Lakes Community College
- Fulton-Montgomery Community College
- Genesee Community College
- Herkimer County Community College
- Hudson Valley Community College
- Jamestown Community College
- Jefferson Community College
- Mohawk Valley Community College
- Monroe Community College
- Nassau Community College
- SUNY Niagara
- North Country Community College
- Onondaga Community College
- SUNY Orange
- Rockland Community College
- Schenectady County Community College
- Suffolk County Community College
- SUNY Sullivan
- Tompkins Cortland Community College
- SUNY Ulster
- Westchester Community College

=== Educational Opportunity Centers ===
- Bronx Educational Opportunity Center
- Brooklyn Educational Opportunity Center
- Buffalo Educational Opportunity Center
- Capital District Educational Opportunity Center
- Long Island Educational Opportunity Center
- Manhattan Educational Opportunity Center
- North Bronx Career Counseling and Outreach Center
- Queens Educational Opportunity Center
- Rochester Educational Opportunity Center
- Schenectady Outreach Center
- Syracuse Educational Opportunity Center
- Westchester Educational Opportunity Center
Location of SUNY campuses within New York state.
Red: University centers; Black: Other doctoral-granting institutions; Yellow: Comprehensive colleges; Green: Technology colleges; Blue: Community colleges.

== Medical centers and hospitals ==
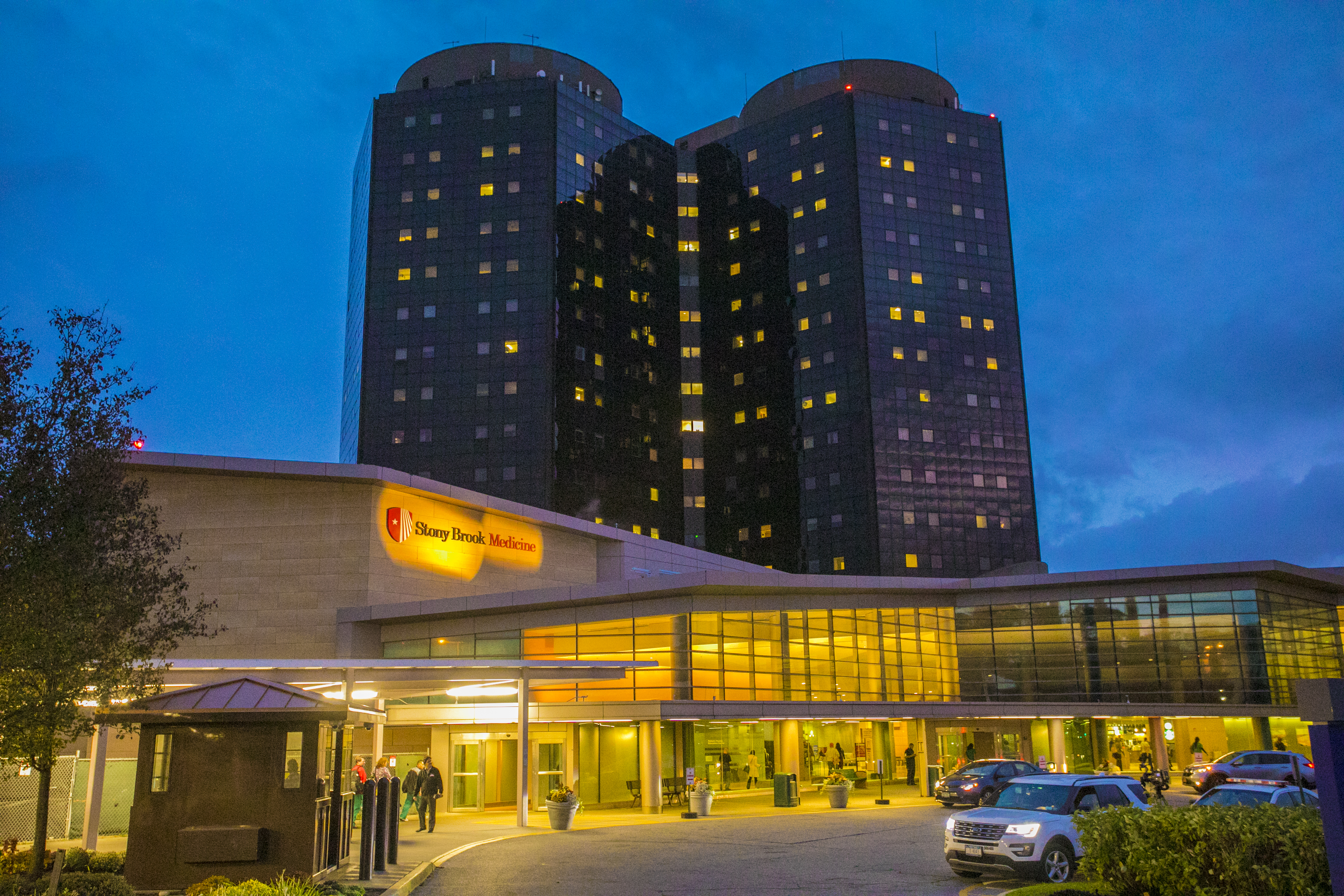
Stony Brook University Hospital

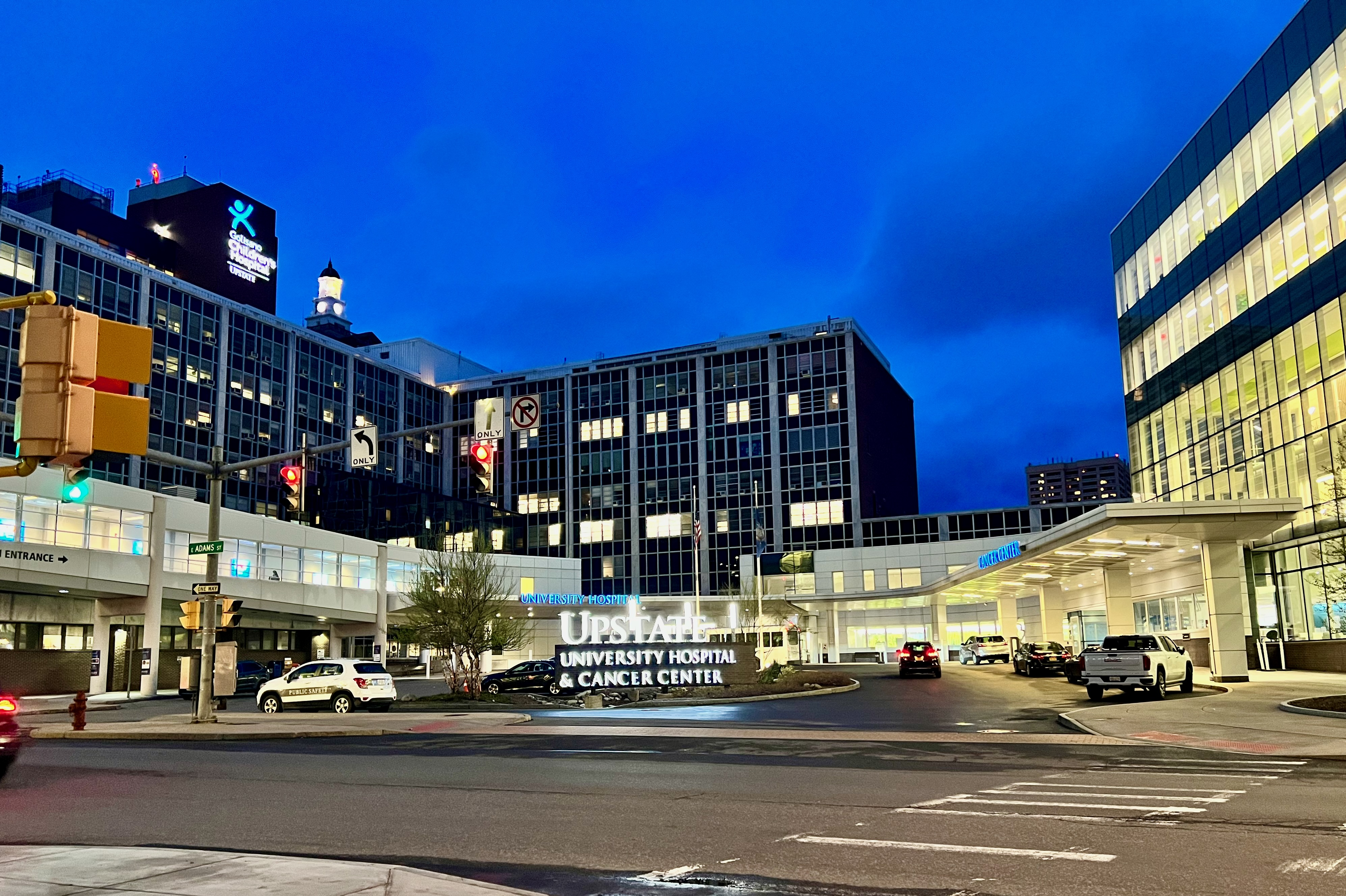
Upstate University Hospital

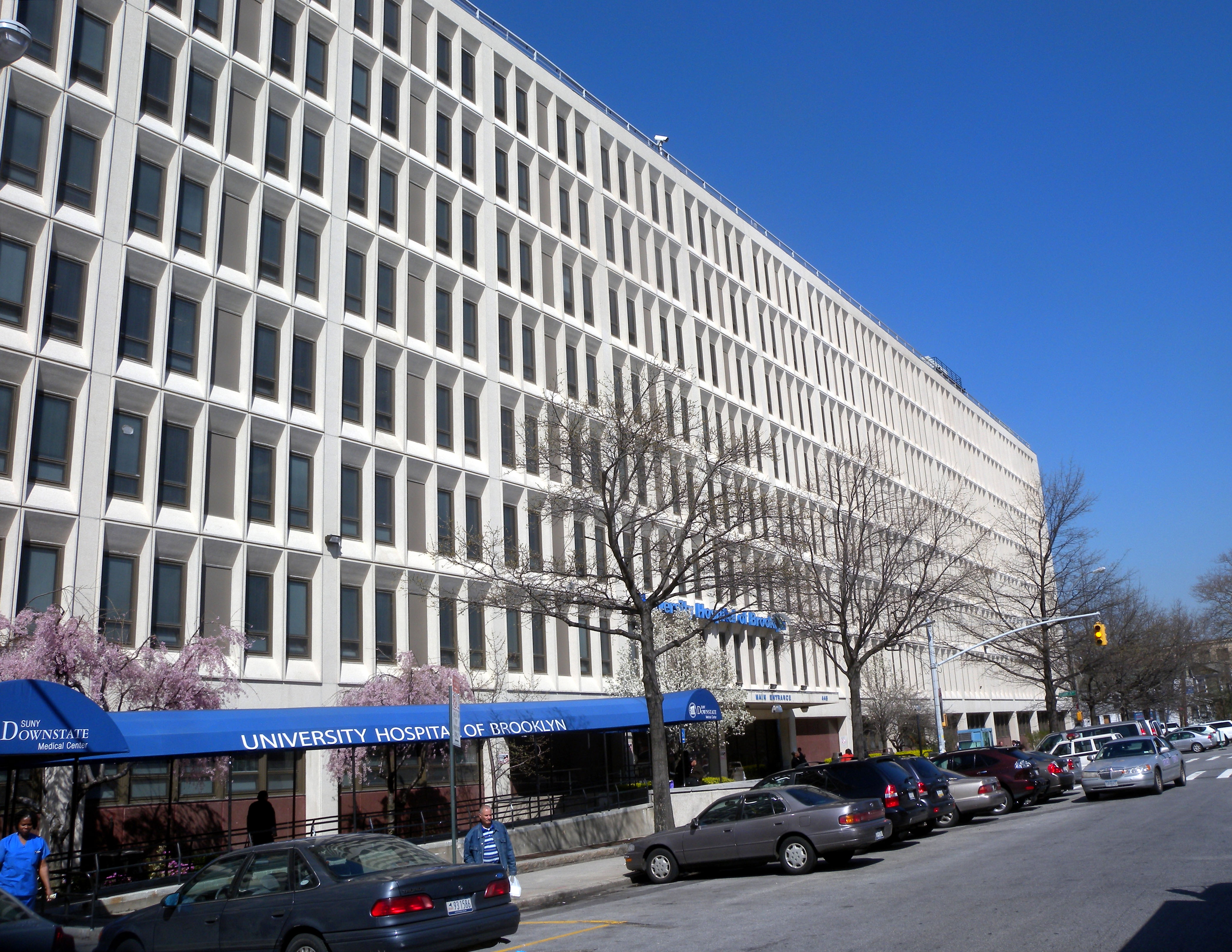
University Hospital of Brooklyn

The State University of New York operates three comprehensive academic medical centers, which integrate a medical school with a university hospital:

- Upstate University Hospital, Norton College of Medicine in Syracuse
- Stony Brook University Hospital, Renaissance School of Medicine in Stony Brook
- Downstate Medical Center, Downstate College of Medicine in Brooklyn

A fourth medical school, the Jacobs School of Medicine in Buffalo, does not have its own hospital, and instead affiliates with several Buffalo-area hospitals. The SUNY system is also home to the College of Optometry in New York City, which maintains its own eye clinic.

Each medical center serves as the primary teaching site for that campus's medical school. SUNY medical programs have consistently ranked in the top 90 in both research and primary care categories, according to annual rankings published by U.S. News & World Report. The teaching hospitals affiliated with each school are also highly regarded and in 2022 all three medical centers generated US$3.86 billion through patient care accounting for 29% of total SUNY revenue.

In the latter half of the 20th century, the SUNY hospitals became the cores of full-fledged regional health systems; they were gradually supplemented by many outpatient clinics, offices, and institutes. SUNY medical centers currently play a major role in providing healthcare to the most-needy and marginalized populations and serve large numbers of patients who are uninsured, under-insured or covered by Medicare and Medicaid programs. In 2020, medical school applications increased by 20.4% at SUNY medical schools systemwide, with schools receiving over 24,118 applications from students for only 685 seats.

With rising interest in medicine, former SUNY Chancellor Jim Malatras announced the first statewide initiative, the Pre-Med Opportunity Program, to help more EOP students get accepted into SUNY's medical schools in February 2021. Later in the year in May, 25 college students in junior/senior standing from 10 SUNY schools were selected to receive academic guidance at the Norton College of Medicine while pursuing their medical degrees. The SUNY system will cover all costs for the summer academic enrichment program and the program will expand over the next few years.

SUNY medical, health professions and nursing schools graduate more than 11,000 health professionals annually, including one of three physicians (1 in 33 in the United States), nearly one of three nurses and one of four dentists in the state.

== Statistics ==
=== University centers ===
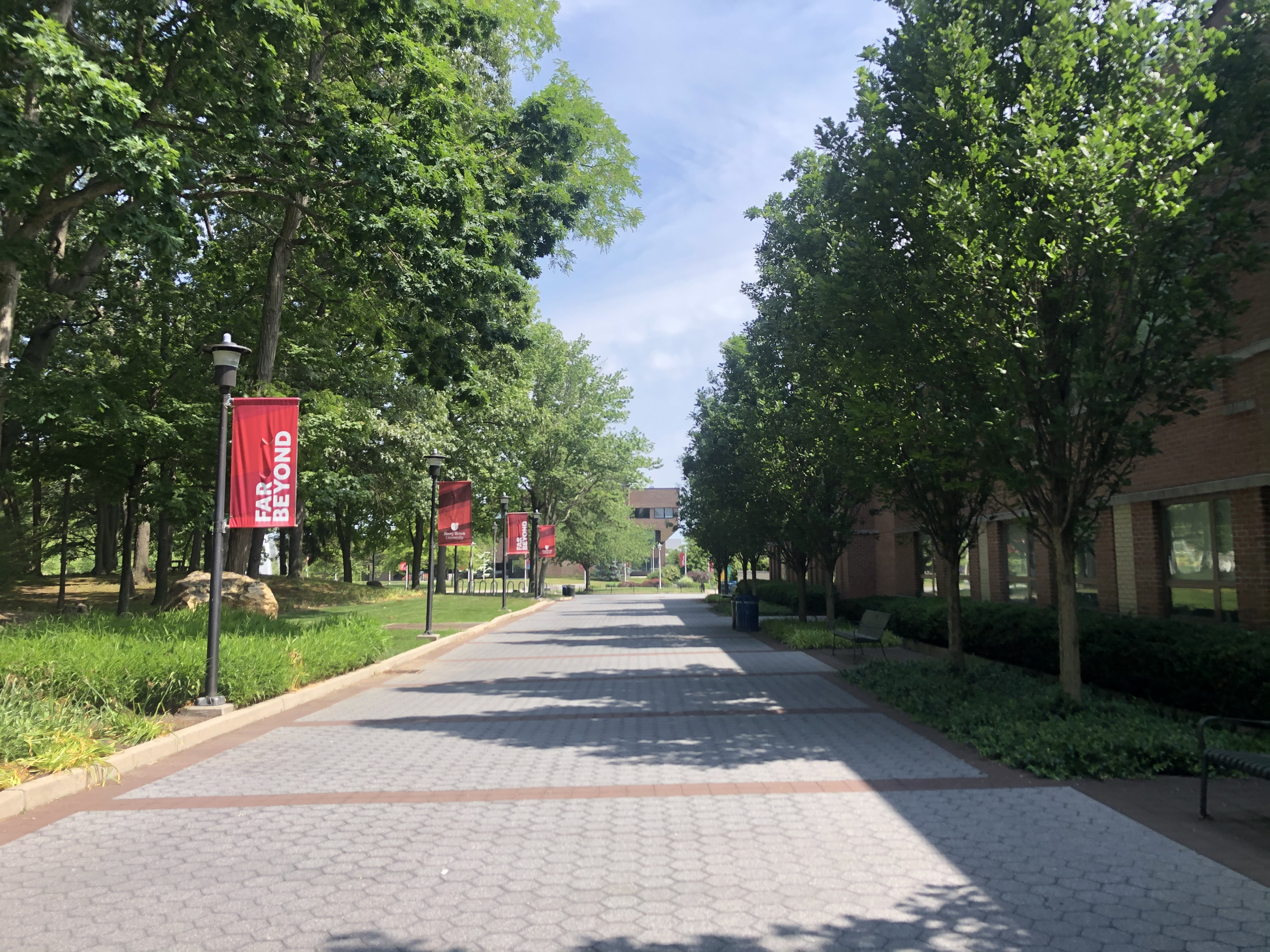
Stony Brook's West Campus

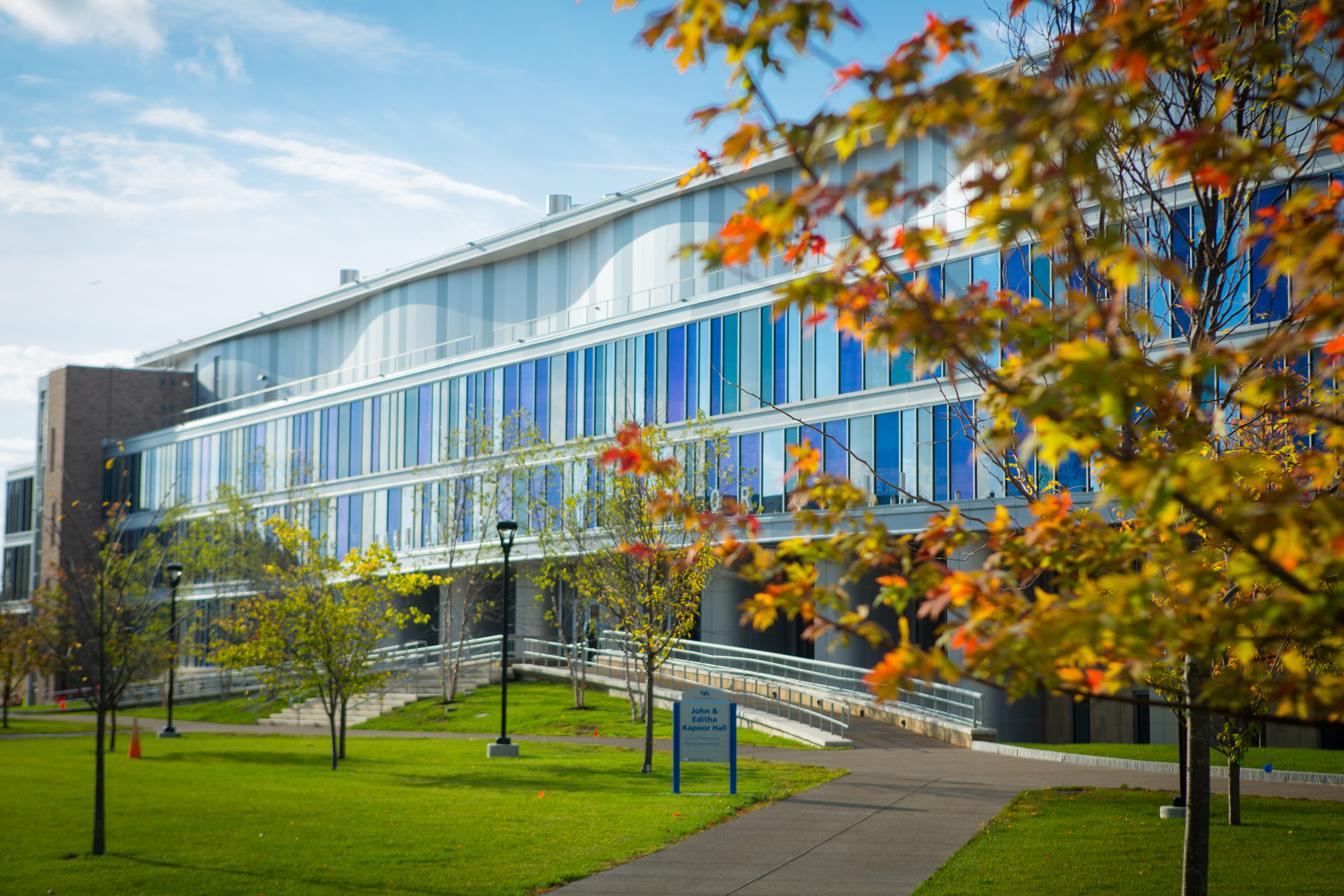
University at Buffalo's Kapoor Hall

New York's largest individual public university by enrollment is the State University of New York at Buffalo, which was founded by U.S. President and Vice President Millard Fillmore. Buffalo has an enrollment total of approximately 32,000 students and receives the most applications out of all SUNY schools.

Campus	Acreage	Founded	Enrollment	Endowment	Operations	Acceptance Rate	USNWR Rank (2024)	Athletics Nickname	Athletics
Albany	1,421	1844	17,426	US$197.3 million	$0.54 billion	53%	133	Great Danes	NCAA Div I America East
Binghamton	930	1946	18,652	US$330 million	$0.45 billion	41%	73	Bearcats	NCAA Div I America East
Buffalo	1,200+ across 3 campuses	1846	31,656	US$1.17 billion	$3.53 billion	60%	76	Bulls	NCAA Div I Mid-American
Stony Brook	1,039	1957	27,252	US$825 million	$2.09 billion	44%	58	Seawolves	NCAA Div I CAA

=== Costs ===
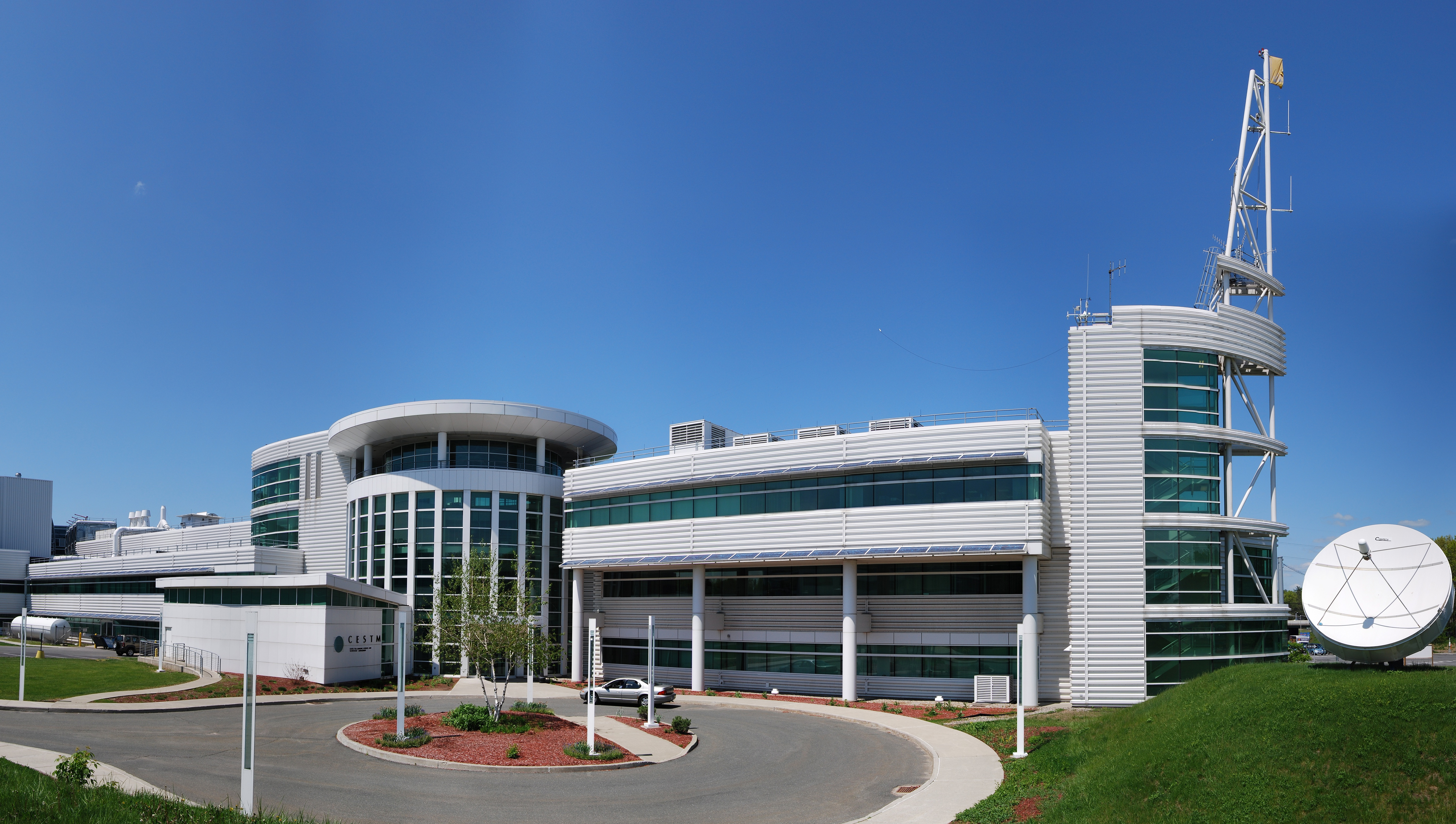
University at Albany's Weather Center

For the 2017–2018 academic year, tuition costs at SUNY schools for an undergraduate degree were less than two-thirds the cost of most public colleges in the United States. For example, tuition at the University at Buffalo for an undergraduate degree is $9,828 per semester or $27,068 per year for non-resident students. In contrast, undergraduate tuition for non-resident students at the University of Maryland is $35,216 per year, and non-resident tuition and fees at the University of Oregon are $32,535 per year.

New York State also offers free tuition for all public colleges and universities for families who have an income of lower than $125,000 and are residents of the state. Other requirements to qualify for free SUNY education include full-time enrollment and staying in the state for a number of years after graduating. In the 2017–2018 award year, 70,694 SUNY students received the Federal Pell Grant.

For the 2019–2020 academic year, medical school tuition costs at the Norton College of Medicine for the M.D. program were $43,670 in-state and $65,160 out of state. Tuition costs across all SUNY medical schools are similar to those at Norton and the cost is less than the average cost of medical schools in the United States.

=== Research funding ===
School	NSF funding rank	Funding dollars (USD)
Buffalo	56	$387,863,000
Stony Brook	97	$225,712,000
Albany	134	$137,759,000
Binghamton	161	$76,005,000
Downstate	211	$39,354,000
Upstate	222	$34,286,000
ESF	259	$21,239,000
Optometry	428	$3,637,000
Farmingdale	441	$3,213,000
Buffalo State	515	$2,106,000
Purchase	567	$1,433,000
Brockport	577	$1,321,000
Geneseo	592	$1,201,000
Cobleskill	625	$908,000
Cortland	629	$819,000
Oswego	632	$725,000

== Intercollegiate athletics ==
Every school within the SUNY system manages its own athletics program, which greatly varies the level of competition at each institution.

=== NCAA ===
==== Division I ====
- The four university centers compete at the NCAA Division I level for all of their sports. All but Binghamton field football teams, with Buffalo in Division I FBS (formerly Division I-A) and Albany and Stony Brook in Division I FCS (formerly Division I-AA). The four Cornell statutory colleges compete as part of the university as a member of the Ivy League, an FCS conference.

==== Division III ====
- Most SUNY colleges, technical schools and community schools compete at the NCAA Division III level. The State University of New York Athletic Conference consists entirely of SUNY colleges.

=== Other associations ===
- SUNY Environmental Science and Forestry is a member of the United States Collegiate Athletic Association.
- A small number of community colleges compete at the National Junior College Athletic Association throughout their three divisions.

=== Rivalries ===
The most prominent intra-SUNY rivalry is between the Albany Great Danes and Binghamton Bearcats. The two belong to the America East Conference. Frequently referred to as the I-88 Rivalry, Binghamton and Albany sit at either end of Interstate 88 (roughly 2.5 hours apart). Both teams are known to post the highest visitor attendance at either school's athletic events. Both schools also have less intense rivalries with a former America East member, the Stony Brook Seawolves. In football, a sport not sponsored by the America East, Albany and Stony Brook have a rivalry in the Coastal Athletic Association, and play each other annually in the Battle for the Golden Apple.

The University at Buffalo tends to have a rivalry in basketball with two private colleges in the same geographical area. Canisius College and Buffalo's South Campus are 2.5 miles apart on Main St. in Buffalo. Their other rival is Niagara University in Lewiston, NY. All three share rivalries with Saint Bonaventure University, another private college 70 miles south of Buffalo.

SUNY Oswego and SUNY Plattsburgh also share a notable rivalry in Division III hockey, with that game almost always having the SUNYAC regular season title up for grabs.

SUNY Cobleskill and SUNY Delhi rivalry focuses on basketball, cross country, and previously track, although Cobleskill track and field started competing at the NCAA Division III level in spring 2009. The SUNY Delhi 2003–2004 basketball season was canceled after a basketball game was called with 48 seconds left after several SUNY Delhi basketball players nearly started a brawl in the Ioro Gymnasium at SUNY Cobleskill on Wednesday February 4, 2004.

SUNY Oneonta has developed a rivalry in almost every sport with SUNY Cortland. They share the red dragon as a team nickname, and their matchups are known as the "Battle of the Red Dragons".

There is an unusual sports rivalry between SUNY College of Environmental Science and Forestry and Finger Lakes Community College, with both campuses sponsoring nationally ranked teams in woodsman competitions.

== University Police ==
The New York State University Police (NYSUP) is the law enforcement agency of the State University of New York (SUNY) system. Approximately 600 uniformed officers and investigators, as well as sixty-four chiefs, serve the 29 state college and university campuses throughout the state.

University Police Officers (UPO) are charged with crime detection and prevention, in addition to the enforcement of state and local laws, rules, and regulations. As part of the unit's prevention activities, officers speak on topics such as sexual assault, drugs, crime prevention and traffic safety. Officers are responsible for developing and maintaining a positive relationship with students, faculty, and staff in order to ensure safety and facilitate cooperation within the campus community.

=== SUNY Security Force (1968–1998) ===
During the mid-1960s, unrest on campuses including demonstrations and protests against the Vietnam War, growing drug use, questioning authority and various political movements and demonstrations prompted the creation of a unified SUNY public safety program. The SUNY Security Force was founded on September 20, 1968. The first civil service exam for the position of Campus Security Officer was given in 1971. The SUNY Security Force was initially part of the Education Law, but was moved to the Penal Law in 1980.

In 1974, the University at Albany security force became the first to be armed.

Several incidents during the 1990s created calls for the security force to be converted into full-fledged police agencies. These included a hostage-taking in a University at Albany lecture hall by a deranged gunman, the "Bike Path Rapist" who killed a female student at the University at Buffalo and the suspicious circumstances regarding the disappearance of a University at Albany student while on campus.

On July 22, 1998, the SUNY Police bill was signed by Governor George Pataki. This bill provided for the creation of the New York State University Police. One clause requires each campus president to enter into a "mutual aid" agreement with adjoining police agencies.

=== NY State University Police (1999–present) ===
The security forces became the NY State University Police on January 1, 1999.

NYSUP union President James McCartney testified in 2007 before the state Senate Higher Education Committee and, again in 2008, to the SUNY Board of Trustees. His testimony discussed what he claimed to be a dysfunctional, decentralized command system and ongoing staffing, equipment, and training deficiencies. McCartney also expressed concern about the "top-heavy" UPD Chief staff, noting its sixty-five management positions, compared to a combined total of twenty-four across other state law enforcement agencies.

A 2007 investigative audit by the New York State Comptroller found that the majority of SUNY campuses had, in violation of the Federal Clery Act, underreported crimes and failed to disclose required safety and security policies. Following the arrest in 2009 of three SUNY Geneseo students in relation to the death of a nineteen-year-old student, it was revealed that the New York State Inspector General was investigating the incident. Investigators appeared to be focusing the accuracy of crime reporting and on allegations that the police administration was not notifying neighboring agencies of students engaging in off-campus criminal activity. The audit of SUNY compliance with the Clery act was appealed because of complaints that "accounting tricks" were used to find fault with Annual Security Reports (ASR) by the Office of the State Comptroller. After much discussion and negotiation, OSC issued a formal letter that stated that any discrepancies reported in an earlier audit had been corrected by SUNY, and that campuses were substantially in compliance.

In 2010, the New York State University Police at Stony Brook University became the second in the New York State University Police system to become an accredited law enforcement agency by the New York State Department of Criminal Justice services. The accreditation shows that the department exceeds the standards required to be a law enforcement agency in the state of New York. Fewer than half of the law enforcement agencies in New York meet accreditation requirements.

In December 2015, New York State passed a bill enabling University Police Officers (UPO) to retire after 25 years. Prior to 2015, the New York State University Police was the only state law enforcement agency requiring employees to work to age 63 to earn pension eligibility. This had led to instability and a "train and transfer" cycle, where young officers would quickly leave to join law enforcement agencies with more attractive pension plans.

== See also ==
- SUNY Press
- Education in New York (state)
- List of colleges and universities in New York (state)
- List of largest United States colleges by enrollment
- List of largest universities by enrollment
