= John Mitchell Jr. (politician) =

American politician

John "Larry" Mitchell

Member of the Delaware House of Representatives from the 13th district
- In office November 8, 2006 – November 9, 2022
- Preceded by: John F. Van Sant
- Succeeded by: DeShanna Neal

Personal details
- Born: October 18, 1954 (age 71) Wilmington, Delaware, US
- Party: Democratic
- Education: University of Delaware

John "Larry" Mitchell Jr. (born October 18, 1954) is an American politician. He was a Democratic member of the Delaware House of Representatives, representing District 13. He was elected in 2006 after the retirement of Democrat John F. Van Sant. In 2019, he was elected majority whip in the House. He lost in the 2022 Democratic primary by 24 votes to DeShanna Neal, who went on to win the seat.

Mitchell graduated from the New Castle County Police and Delaware State Police academies, and attended Delaware Technical Community College and the University of Delaware.

== Electoral history ==
- In 2006, Mitchell won the three-way Democratic primary with 375 votes (41.6%), and went on to win the general election with 3,126 votes (59.6%) against Republican nominee John Jaremchuk.
- In 2008, Mitchell won the general election with 6,547 votes (96.1%) against Blue Enigma Party candidate Jeffrey Brown, who was simultaneously running for governor.
- In 2010, Mitchell won the general election with 4,345 votes (90.8%) in a rematch against Jeffrey Brown.
- In 2012, Mitchell was unopposed for the general election, winning 7,384 votes.
- In 2014, Mitchell was unopposed for the general election, winning 3,258 votes.
- In 2016, Mitchell was unopposed for the general election, winning 7,287 votes.
- In 2018, Mitchell was unopposed for the general election, winning 5,528 votes.
