= National Board of Examiners in Optometry =

The National Board of Examiners in Optometry (N.B.E.O.) is the testing organization for the field of optometry, in the United States of America (including Puerto Rico). The organization composes and administers various exams in the profession.

Optometry was listed as one of the ten best US Jobs of 2022 by CNBC, passing the National Board of Examiners in Optometry test is a key requisite to entering this highly paid field.
