= 2016 Delaware House of Representatives election =

- November 8, 2016

All 41 seats in the Delaware House of Representatives 21 seats needed for a majority
- Turnout: 65.35%
	Majority party	Minority party
Leader	Peter Schwartzkopf	Daniel Short
Party	Democratic	Republican
Leader's seat	14th - Rehoboth Beach	39th - Seaford
Last election	25	16
Seats before	25	15
Seats won	25	16
Seat change	Steady	Steady
Popular vote	226,083	149,871
Percentage	59.51%	39.45%
- House results by district Democratic hold Republican hold
Speaker before election
Peter Schwartzkopf
Democratic
Elected Speaker
Peter Schwartzkopf
Democratic

An election was held on November 8, 2016, to elect all 41 members to Delaware's House of Representatives. The election coincided with the elections for other offices, including U.S. President, U.S. House of Representatives, Governor and state senate. The primary election was held on September 13, 2016. There was no change in the composition of the House as both Democrats and Republicans held on to their seats, winning 25 and 16 seats respectively.

== Results ==
District	Incumbent	Party	Elected Representative	Party
1st	Charles Potter Jr.	Dem	Charles Potter Jr.	Dem
2nd	Stephanie Bolden	Dem	Stephanie Bolden	Dem
3rd	Helene Keeley	Dem	Helene Keeley	Dem
4th	Gerald Brady	Dem	Gerald Brady	Dem
5th	Melanie George Smith	Dem	Melanie George Smith	Dem
6th	Debra Heffernan	Dem	Debra Heffernan	Dem
7th	Bryon Short	Dem	Bryon Short	Dem
8th	Quinn Johnson	Dem	Quinn Johnson	Dem
9th	Kevin Hensley	Rep	Kevin Hensley	Rep
10th	Sean Matthews	Dem	Sean Matthews	Dem
11th	Jeffrey Spiegelman	Rep	Jeffrey Spiegelman	Rep
12th	Deborah Hudson	Rep	Deborah Hudson	Rep
13th	Larry Mitchell	Dem	Larry Mitchell	Dem
14th	Peter Schwartzkopf	Dem	Peter Schwartzkopf	Dem
15th	Valerie Longhurst	Dem	Valerie Longhurst	Dem
16th	J.J. Johnson	Dem	J.J. Johnson	Dem
17th	Michael Mulrooney	Dem	Michael Mulrooney	Dem
18th	David Bentz	Dem	David Bentz	Dem
19th	Kimberly Williams	Dem	Kimberly Williams	Dem
20th	Stephen Smyk	Rep	Stephen Smyk	Rep
21st	Michael Ramone	Rep	Michael Ramone	Rep
22nd	Joseph Miró	Rep	Joseph Miró	Rep
23rd	Paul Baumbach	Dem	Paul Baumbach	Dem
24th	Edward Osienski	Dem	Edward Osienski	Dem
25th	John Kowalko Jr.	Dem	John Kowalko Jr.	Dem
26th	John Viola	Dem	John Viola	Dem
27th	Earl Jaques Jr.	Dem	Earl Jaques Jr.	Dem
28th	William Carson Jr.	Dem	William Carson Jr.	Dem
29th	Charles Paradee	Dem	Charles Paradee	Dem
30th	William Outten	Rep	William Outten	Rep
31st	Sean Lynn	Dem	Sean Lynn	Dem
32nd	Andria Bennett	Dem	Andria Bennett	Dem
33rd	Harold Peterman	Rep	Charles Postles Jr.	Rep
34th	Lyndon Yearick	Rep	Lyndon Yearick	Rep
35th	David Wilson	Rep	David Wilson	Rep
36th	Harvey Kenton	Rep	Harvey Kenton	Rep
37th	Ruth Briggs King	Rep	Ruth Briggs King	Rep
38th	Ronald Gray	Rep	Ronald Gray	Rep
39th	Daniel Short	Rep	Daniel Short	Rep
40th	Timothy Dukes	Rep	Timothy Dukes	Rep
41st	Richard Collins	Rep	Richard Collins	Rep

=== Statewide ===
Party	Candi- dates	Votes	%	Seats	+/–
Democratic	35	226,083	59.51%	25	Steady
Republican	24	149,871	39.45%	16	Steady
Green	3	2,177	0.57%	0	Steady
Libertarian	2	1,546	0.41%	0	Steady
Independent	1	218	0.06%	0	Steady
Total	65	379,895	100.00%	41	Steady

== Predictions ==
Source	Ranking	As of
Governing	Safe D	October 12, 2016

== Detailed Results ==
Results of the 2016 Delaware House of Representatives election by district:

=== District 1 ===
Incumbent Democrat Charles Potter Jr. has represented the 1st district since 2012.

Delaware House of Representatives 1st district general election, 2016
Party	Candidate	Votes	%
Democratic	Charles Potter Jr. (incumbent)	8,901	100%
Total votes		8,901	100%
Democratic hold			

=== District 2 ===
Incumbent Democrat Stephanie Bolden has represented the 2nd district since 2010.

Delaware House of Representatives 2nd district general election, 2016
Party	Candidate	Votes	%
Democratic	Stephanie Bolden (incumbent)	6,256	100%
Total votes		6,256	100%
Democratic hold			

=== District 3 ===
Incumbent Democrat Helene Keeley has represented the 3rd district and its predecessors since 1996.

Delaware House of Representatives 3rd district general election, 2016
Party	Candidate	Votes	%
Democratic	Helene Keeley (incumbent)	6,060	100%
Total votes		6,060	100%
Democratic hold			

=== District 4 ===
Incumbent Democrat Gerald Brady has represented the 4th district since 2006.

Delaware House of Representatives 4th district general election, 2016
Party	Candidate	Votes	%
Democratic	Gerald Brady (incumbent)	9,565	100%
Total votes		9,565	100%
Democratic hold			

=== District 5 ===
Incumbent Democrat Melanie George Smith has represented the 5th district since 2002.

Delaware House of Representatives 5th district general election, 2016
Party	Candidate	Votes	%
Democratic	Melanie George Smith (incumbent)	8,280	100%
Total votes		8,280	100%
Democratic hold			

=== District 6 ===
Incumbent Democrat Debra Heffernan has represented the 6th district since 2010.

Delaware House of Representatives 6th district general election, 2016
Party	Candidate	Votes	%
Democratic	Debra Heffernan (incumbent)	9,545	100%
Total votes		9,545	100%
Democratic hold			

=== District 7 ===
Incumbent Democrat Bryon Short has represented the 7th district since 2006. Democratic primary

Delaware House of Representatives 7th district Democratic primary election, 2016
Party	Candidate	Votes	%
Democratic	Bryon Short (incumbent)	1,199	63.34%
Democratic	David Brady	694	36.66%
Total votes		1,893	100%

General election

Delaware House of Representatives 7th district general election, 2016
Party	Candidate	Votes	%
Democratic	Bryon Short (incumbent)	8,277	90.10%
Libertarian	C. Robert Wilson	909	9.90%
Total votes		9,186	100%
Democratic hold			

=== District 8 ===
Incumbent Democrat Quinn Johnson has represented the 8th district since 2008.

Delaware House of Representatives 8th district general election, 2016
Party	Candidate	Votes	%
Democratic	Quinn Johnson (incumbent)	8,703	100%
Total votes		8,703	100%
Democratic hold			

=== District 9 ===
Incumbent Republican Kevin Hensley has represented the 9th district since 2014. Democratic primary

Delaware House of Representatives 9th district Democratic primary election, 2016
Party	Candidate	Votes	%
Democratic	Monique Johns	879	60.92%
Democratic	Richard Griffiths	564	39.08%
Total votes		1,443	100%

General election

Delaware House of Representatives 9th district general election, 2016
Party	Candidate	Votes	%
Republican	Kevin Hensley (incumbent)	7,812	60.37%
Democratic	Monique Johns	5,130	39.63%
Total votes		12,942	100%
Republican hold			

=== District 10 ===
Incumbent Democrat Sean Matthews has represented the 10th district since 2014. Democratic primary

Delaware House of Representatives 10th district Democratic primary election, 2016
Party	Candidate	Votes	%
Democratic	Sean Matthews (incumbent)	1,308	75.47%
Democratic	Dennis Williams	425	24.53%
Total votes		1,733	100%

General election

Delaware House of Representatives 10th district general election, 2016
Party	Candidate	Votes	%
Democratic	Sean Matthews (incumbent)	6,654	60.74%
Republican	Judith Travis	4,300	39.26%
Total votes		10,954	100%
Democratic hold			

=== District 11 ===
Incumbent Republican Jeffrey Spiegelman has represented the 11th district since 2012.

Delaware House of Representatives 11th district general election, 2016
Party	Candidate	Votes	%
Republican	Jeffrey Spiegelman (incumbent)	6,821	69.56%
Democratic	David Neilson	2,985	30.44%
Total votes		9,806	100%
Republican hold			

=== District 12 ===
Incumbent Republican Deborah Hudson has represented the 12th district since 1994.

Delaware House of Representatives 12th district general election, 2016
Party	Candidate	Votes	%
Republican	Deborah Hudson (incumbent)	9,866	100%
Total votes		9,866	100%
Republican hold			

=== District 13 ===
Incumbent Democrat Larry Mitchell has represented the 13th district since 2006.

Delaware House of Representatives 13th district general election, 2016
Party	Candidate	Votes	%
Democratic	Larry Mitchell (incumbent)	7,287	100%
Total votes		7,287	100%
Democratic hold			

=== District 14 ===
Incumbent Democratic House Speaker Peter Schwartzkopf has represented the 14th district since 2002. Democratic primary

Delaware House of Representatives 14th district Democratic primary election, 2016
Party	Candidate	Votes	%
Democratic	Peter Schwartzkopf (incumbent)	1,868	73.90%
Democratic	Don Peterson	660	26.10%
Total votes		2,528	100%

General election

Delaware House of Representatives 14th district general election, 2016
Party	Candidate	Votes	%
Democratic	Peter Schwartzkopf (incumbent)	9,297	63.55%
Republican	James Louis Demartino	5,332	36.45%
Total votes		14,629	100%
Democratic hold			

=== District 15 ===
Incumbent Democrat Valerie Longhurst has represented the 15th district since 2004. Democratic primary

Delaware House of Representatives 15th district Democratic primary election, 2016
Party	Candidate	Votes	%
Democratic	Valerie Longhurst (incumbent)	1,106	64.46%
Democratic	James Burton	610	35.54%
Total votes		1,716	100%

General election

Delaware House of Representatives 15th district general election, 2016
Party	Candidate	Votes	%
Democratic	Valerie Longhurst (incumbent)	9,390	100%
Total votes		9,390	100%
Democratic hold			

=== District 16 ===
Incumbent Democrat J.J. Johnson has represented the 16th district since 2004.

Delaware House of Representatives 16th district general election, 2016
Party	Candidate	Votes	%
Democratic	J.J. Johnson (incumbent)	7,536	100%
Total votes		7,536	100%
Democratic hold			

=== District 17 ===
Incumbent Democrat Michael Mulrooney has represented the th district since 1998.

Delaware House of Representatives 17th district general election, 2016
Party	Candidate	Votes	%
Democratic	Michael Mulrooney (incumbent)	7,721	100%
Total votes		7,721	100%
Democratic hold			

=== District 18 ===
Incumbent Democrat David Bentz has represented the 18th district since 2015.

Delaware House of Representatives 18th district general election, 2016
Party	Candidate	Votes	%
Democratic	David Bentz (incumbent)	7,348	100%
Total votes		7,348	100%
Democratic hold			

=== District 19 ===
Incumbent Democrat Kimberly Williams has represented the 19th district since 2012.

Delaware House of Representatives 19th district general election, 2016
Party	Candidate	Votes	%
Democratic	Kimberly Williams (incumbent)	5,967	63.00%
Republican	James Startzman Jr.	3,503	37.00%
Total votes		9,470	100%
Democratic hold			

=== District 20 ===
Incumbent Republican Stephen Smyk has represented the 20th district since 2012.

Delaware House of Representatives 20th district general election, 2016
Party	Candidate	Votes	%
Republican	Stephen Smyk (incumbent)	9,209	61.57%
Democratic	Barbara Vaughan	5,529	36.96%
Independent Party	Donald Ayotte	218	1.47%
Total votes		14,956	100%
Republican hold			

=== District 21 ===
Incumbent Republican Michael Ramone has represented the 21st district since 2008.

Delaware House of Representatives 21st district general election, 2016
Party	Candidate	Votes	%
Republican	Michael Ramone (incumbent)	7,574	82.21%
Green	David McCorquodale	1,638	17.79%
Total votes		9,212	100%
Republican hold			

=== District 22 ===
Incumbent Republican Joseph Miró has represented the 22nd district since 1998.

Delaware House of Representatives 22nd district general election, 2016
Party	Candidate	Votes	%
Republican	Joseph Miró (incumbent)	8,964	65.91%
Democratic	Lanette Edwards	4,329	31.83%
Green	Bernard August	306	2.26%
Total votes		13,599	100%
Republican hold			

=== District 23 ===
Incumbent Democrat Paul Baumbach has represented the 23rd district since 2012.

Delaware House of Representatives 23rd district general election, 2016
Party	Candidate	Votes	%
Democratic	Paul Baumbach (incumbent)	6,550	100%
Total votes		6,550	100%
Democratic hold			

=== District 24 ===
Incumbent Democrat Edward Osienski has represented the 24th district since 2010.

Delaware House of Representatives 24th district general election, 2016
Party	Candidate	Votes	%
Democratic	Edward Osienski (incumbent)	6,406	68.72%
Republican	Timothy Conrad	2,915	31.28%
Total votes		9,321	100%
Democratic hold			

=== District 25 ===
Incumbent Democrat John Kowalko Jr. has represented the 25th district since 2006.

Delaware House of Representatives 25th district general election, 2016
Party	Candidate	Votes	%
Democratic	John Kowalko Jr. (incumbent)	5,123	68.55%
Republican	Michael Nagorski	2,350	31.45%
Total votes		7,473	100%
Democratic hold			

=== District 26 ===
Incumbent Democrat John Viola has represented the 26th district since 1998.

Delaware House of Representatives 26th district general election, 2016
Party	Candidate	Votes	%
Democratic	John Viola (incumbent)	7,745	100%
Total votes		7,745	100%
Democratic hold			

=== District 27 ===
Incumbent Democrat Earl Jaques Jr. has represented the 27th district since 2008.

Delaware House of Representatives 27th district general election, 2016
Party	Candidate	Votes	%
Democratic	Earl Jaques Jr. (incumbent)	9,182	100%
Total votes		9,182	100%
Democratic hold			

=== District 28 ===
Incumbent Democrat William Carson Jr. has represented the 28th district since 2008.

Delaware House of Representatives 28th district general election, 2016
Party	Candidate	Votes	%
Democratic	William Carson Jr. (incumbent)	7,581	100%
Total votes		7,581	100%
Democratic hold			

=== District 29 ===
Incumbent Democrat Charles Paradee has represented the 29th district since 2012.

Delaware House of Representatives 29th district general election, 2016
Party	Candidate	Votes	%
Democratic	Charles Paradee (incumbent)	6,777	62.01%
Republican	Janice Gallagher	3,918	35.85%
Green	Ruth James	233	2.14%
Total votes		10,928	100%
Democratic hold			

=== District 30 ===
Incumbent Republican William Outten has represented the 30th district since 2004.

Delaware House of Representatives 30th district general election, 2016
Party	Candidate	Votes	%
Republican	William Outten (incumbent)	6,337	70.73%
Democratic	Charles Groce	2,623	29.27%
Total votes		8,960	100%
Republican hold			

=== District 31 ===
Incumbent Democrat Sean Lynn has represented the 31st district since 2014.

Delaware House of Representatives 31st district general election, 2016
Party	Candidate	Votes	%
Democratic	Sean Lynn (incumbent)	5,765	66.55%
Republican	M. Jean Dowding	2,897	33.45%
Total votes		8,662	100%
Democratic hold			

=== District 32 ===
Incumbent Democrat Andria Bennett has represented the 32nd district since 2012.

Delaware House of Representatives 32nd district general election, 2016
Party	Candidate	Votes	%
Democratic	Andria Bennett (incumbent)	4,241	60.48%
Republican	Patricia McDaniel Foltz	2,771	39.52%
Total votes		7,012	100%
Democratic hold			

=== District 33 ===
Incumbent Republican Harold Peterman has represented the 33rd district since 2010. Peterman didn't seek re-election and fellow Republican Charles Postles Jr. won the open seat. Republican primary

Delaware House of Representatives 33rd district Republican primary election, 2016
Party	Candidate	Votes	%
Republican	Charles Postles Jr.	714	45.21%
Republican	Robert Scott	559	35.42%
Republican	Morgan Hudson	306	19.37%
Total votes		1,579	100%

General election

Delaware House of Representatives 33rd district general election, 2016
Party	Candidate	Votes	%
Republican	Charles Postles Jr.	5,780	57.51%
Democratic	Karen Williams	4,271	42.49%
Total votes		10,051	100%
Republican hold			

=== District 34 ===
Incumbent Republican Lyndon Yearick has represented the 34th district since 2014.

Delaware House of Representatives 34th district general election, 2016
Party	Candidate	Votes	%
Republican	Lyndon Yearick (incumbent)	6,518	59.08%
Democratic	David Henderson	4,516	40.92%
Total votes		11,034	100%
Republican hold			

=== District 35 ===
Incumbent Republican David Wilson has represented the 35th district since 2008. Republican primary

Delaware House of Representatives 35th district Republican primary election, 2016
Party	Candidate	Votes	%
Republican	David Wilson (incumbent)	1,252	69.21%
Republican	Robert Mitchell	557	30.79%
Total votes		1,809	100%

General election

Delaware House of Representatives 35th district general election, 2016
Party	Candidate	Votes	%
Republican	David Wilson (incumbent)	6,553	72.91%
Democratic	Gary Wolfe	2,435	27.09%
Total votes		8,988	100%
Republican hold			

=== District 36 ===
Incumbent Republican Harvey Kenton has represented the 36th district since 2010.

Delaware House of Representatives 36th district general election, 2016
Party	Candidate	Votes	%
Republican	Harvey Kenton (incumbent)	7,175	100%
Total votes		7,175	100%
Republican hold			

=== District 37 ===
Incumbent Republican Ruth Briggs King has represented the th district since 2009.

Delaware House of Representatives 37th district general election, 2016
Party	Candidate	Votes	%
Republican	Ruth Briggs King (incumbent)	6,720	62.47%
Democratic	Paulette Rappa	4,038	37.53%
Total votes		10,758	100%
Republican hold			

=== District 38 ===
Incumbent Republican Ronald Gray has represented the 38th district since 2012.

Delaware House of Representatives 38th district general election, 2016
Party	Candidate	Votes	%
Republican	Ronald Gray (incumbent)	12,188	100%
Total votes		12,188	100%
Republican hold			

=== District 39 ===
Incumbent Republican Daniel Short has represented the 39th district since 2006.

Delaware House of Representatives 39th district general election, 2016
Party	Candidate	Votes	%
Republican	Daniel Short (incumbent)	6,643	91.25%
Libertarian	James Brittingham	637	8.75%
Total votes		7,280	100%
Republican hold			

=== District 40 ===
Incumbent Republican Timothy Dukes has represented the 40th district since 2012.

Delaware House of Representatives 40th district general election, 2016
Party	Candidate	Votes	%
Republican	Timothy Dukes (incumbent)	7,826	100%
Total votes		7,826	100%
Republican hold			

=== District 41 ===
Incumbent Republican Richard Collins has represented the 41st district since 2014.

Delaware House of Representatives 41st district general election, 2016
Party	Candidate	Votes	%
Republican	Richard Collins (incumbent)	5,899	59.18%
Democratic	S. Bradley Connor	4,070	40.82%
Total votes		9,969	100%
Republican hold			
