= 2010 Delaware House of Representatives election =

- November 2, 2010

All 41 seats in the Delaware House of Representatives 21 seats needed for a majority
- Turnout: 49%
	Majority party	Minority party
Leader	Robert Gilligan	Richard Cathcart (retired)
Party	Democratic	Republican
Leader's seat	19th - Wilmington	9th- Middletown
Last election	25	16
Seats before	24	17
Seats won	26	15
Seat change	▲2	▼2
Popular vote	150,521	136,363
Percentage	51.85%	46.98%
- Results: Democratic gain Republican gain Democratic hold Republican hold
Speaker before election
Robert Gilligan
Democratic
Elected Speaker
Robert Gilligan
Democratic

An election was held on November 2, 2010, to elect all 41 members to Delaware's House of Representatives. The election coincided with the elections for other offices, including for U.S. Senate, U.S. House of Representatives, and state senate. The primary election was held on September 14, 2010.

== Results ==
District	Incumbent	Party	Elected Representative	Party
1st	Dennis Williams	Dem	Dennis Williams	Dem
2nd	Hazel Plant	Dem	Stephanie Bolden	Dem
3rd	Helene Keeley	Dem	Helene Keeley	Dem
4th	Gerald Brady	Dem	Gerald Brady	Dem
5th	Melanie George	Dem	Melanie George	Dem
6th	Tom Kovach	Rep	Debra Heffernan	Dem
7th	Bryon Short	Dem	Bryon Short	Dem
8th	Quinn Johnson	Dem	Quinn Johnson	Dem
9th	Richard Cathcart	Rep	Rebecca Walker	Dem
10th	Dennis Williams	Dem	Dennis Williams	Dem
11th	Gregory Lavelle	Rep	Gregory Lavelle	Rep
12th	Deborah Hudson	Rep	Deborah Hudson	Rep
13th	Larry Mitchell	Dem	Larry Mitchell	Dem
14th	Peter Schwartzkopf	Dem	Peter Schwartzkopf	Dem
15th	Valerie Longhurst	Dem	Valerie Longhurst	Dem
16th	J.J. Johnson	Dem	J.J. Johnson	Dem
17th	Michael Mulrooney	Dem	Michael Mulrooney	Dem
18th	Michael Barbieri	Dem	Michael Barbieri	Dem
19th	Robert Gilligan	Dem	Robert Gilligan	Dem
20th	Nick Manolakos	Rep	Nick Manolakos	Rep
21st	Michael Ramone	Rep	Michael Ramone	Rep
22nd	Joseph Miró	Rep	Joseph Miró	Rep
23rd	Teresa Schooley	Dem	Teresa Schooley	Dem
24th	William Orbele Jr.	Rep	Edward Osienski	Dem
25th	John Kowalko Jr.	Dem	John Kowalko Jr.	Dem
26th	John Viola	Dem	John Viola	Dem
27th	Earl Jaques Jr.	Dem	Earl Jaques Jr.	Dem
28th	William Carson Jr.	Dem	William Carson Jr.	Dem
29th	Pamela Thornburg	Rep	Lincoln Willis	Rep
30th	William Outten	Rep	William Outten	Rep
31st	Darryl Scott	Dem	Darryl Scott	Dem
32nd	Brad Bennett	Dem	Brad Bennett	Dem
33rd	Robert Walls	Dem	Harold Peterman	Rep
34th	Donald Blakey	Rep	Donald Blakey	Rep
35th	David Wilson	Rep	David Wilson	Rep
36th	V. George Carey	Rep	Harvey Kenton	Rep
37th	Ruth Briggs King	Rep	Ruth Briggs King	Rep
38th	Gerald Hocker	Rep	Gerald Hocker	Rep
39th	Daniel Short	Rep	Daniel Short	Rep
40th	Clifford Lee	Rep	Clifford Lee	Rep
41st	John Atkins	Dem	John Atkins	Dem

=== Statewide ===
Party	Candi- dates	Votes	%	Seats	+/–
Democratic	35	150,521	51.85%	26	▲2
Republican	34	136,363	46.98%	15	▼2
Libertarian	5	1,165	0.40%	0	Steady
Working Families	2	773	0.27%	0	Steady
Independent	3	553	0.19%	0	Steady
Unaffiliated	1	463	0.16%	0	Steady
Blue Enigma	1	440	0.15%	0	Steady
Total	81	290,278	100%	41	Steady

== Predictions ==
Source	Ranking	As of
Governing	Lean D	November 1, 2010

== Detailed Results ==
Results of the 2010 Delaware House of Representatives election by district:

=== District 1 ===
Incumbent Democrat Dennis Williams has represented the 1st district since 1994.

Delaware House of Representatives 1st district general election, 2010
Party	Candidate	Votes	%
Democratic	Dennis Williams (incumbent)	6,044	100%
Total votes		6,044	100%
Democratic hold			

=== District 2 ===
Incumbent Democrat Hazel Plant has represented the 2nd district since 2000. Plant lost re-nomination to fellow Democrat Stephanie Bolden, who ran unopposed in the general election. Democratic primary

Delaware House of Representatives 2nd district Democratic primary election, 2010
Party	Candidate	Votes	%
Democratic	Stephanie Bolden	676	51.17%
Democratic	Hazel Plant (incumbent)	645	48.83%
Total votes		1,321	100%

General election

Delaware House of Representatives 2nd district general election, 2010
Party	Candidate	Votes	%
Democratic	Stephanie Bolden	4,485	100%
Total votes		4,485	100%
Democratic hold			

=== District 3 ===
Incumbent Democrat Helene Keeley has represented the 3rd district and its predecessors since 1996. Democratic primary

Delaware House of Representatives 3rd district Democratic primary election, 2010
Party	Candidate	Votes	%
Democratic	Helene Keeley (incumbent)	736	55.51%
Democratic	Robert Bovell	590	44.49%
Total votes		1,326	100%

General election

Delaware House of Representatives 3rd district general election, 2010
Party	Candidate	Votes	%
Democratic	Helene Keeley (incumbent)	3,375	83.15%
Working Families	Robert Bovell	684	16.85%
Total votes		4,059	100%
Democratic hold			

=== District 4 ===
Incumbent Democrat Gerald Brady has represented the 4th district since 2006.

Delaware House of Representatives 4th district general election, 2010
Party	Candidate	Votes	%
Democratic	Gerald Brady (incumbent)	5,298	65.77%
Republican	Richard Carroll	2,757	34.23%
Total votes		8,055	100%
Democratic hold			

=== District 5 ===
Incumbent Democrat Melanie George has represented the 5th district since 2002.

Delaware House of Representatives 5th district general election, 2010
Party	Candidate	Votes	%
Democratic	Melanie George (incumbent)	4,921	100%
Total votes		4,921	100%
Democratic hold			

=== District 6 ===
Incumbent Republican Tom Kovach has represented the 6th district since 2009. Kovach lost re-election to Democrat Debra Heffernan.

Delaware House of Representatives 6th district general election, 2010
Party	Candidate	Votes	%
Democratic	Debra Heffernan	4,263	51.89%
Republican	Tom Kovach (incumbent)	3,856	46.93%
Libertarian	Matthew John Flebbe	97	1.18%
Total votes		8,216	100%
Democratic gain from Republican			

=== District 7 ===
Incumbent Democrat Bryon Short has represented the 7th district since 2006.

Delaware House of Representatives 7th district general election, 2010
Party	Candidate	Votes	%
Democratic	Bryon Short (incumbent)	4,983	56.86%
Republican	Judith Travis	3,619	41.29%
Independent Party	Scott Gesty	87	0.99%
Libertarian	Scott Gesty	75	0.86%
Total votes		8,764	100%
Democratic hold			

=== District 8 ===
Incumbent Democrat Quinn Johnson has represented the 8th district since 2008. Democratic primary

Delaware House of Representatives 8th district Democratic primary election, 2010
Party	Candidate	Votes	%
Democratic	Quinn Johnson (incumbent)	791	68.66%
Democratic	Valerie Jones-Rabb	361	31.34%
Total votes		1,152	100%

General election

Delaware House of Representatives 8th district general election, 2010
Party	Candidate	Votes	%
Democratic	Quinn Johnson (incumbent)	6,402	63.18%
Republican	Kathleen Rokosz	3,731	36.82%
Total votes		10,133	100%
Democratic hold			

=== District 9 ===
Incumbent Republican Minority leader Richard Cathcart has represented the 9th district since 1998. Democrat Rebecca Walker won the open seat. Democratic primary

Delaware House of Representatives 9th district Democratic primary election, 2010
Party	Candidate	Votes	%
Democratic	Rebecca Walker	970	78.99%
Democratic	Richard Griffiths	258	21.01%
Total votes		1,228	100%

Republican primary

Delaware House of Representatives 9th district Republican primary election, 2010
Party	Candidate	Votes	%
Republican	John Marino	1,522	75.53%
Republican	Anthony Mirto	493	24.47%
Total votes		2,015	100%

General election

Delaware House of Representatives 9th district general election, 2010
Party	Candidate	Votes	%
Democratic	Rebecca Walker	5,583	51.30%
Republican	John Marino	5,301	48.70%
Total votes		10,884	100%
Democratic gain from Republican			

=== District 10 ===
Incumbent Democrat Dennis Williams has represented the 10th district since 2008. Democratic primary

Delaware House of Representatives 10th district Democratic primary election, 2010
Party	Candidate	Votes	%
Democratic	Dennis Williams (incumbent)	727	72.19%
Democratic	Kenneth Dargis Sr.	280	27.81%
Total votes		1,007	100%

General election

Delaware House of Representatives 10th district general election, 2010
Party	Candidate	Votes	%
Democratic	Dennis Williams (incumbent)	4,314	54.65%
Republican	Robert Rhodunda	3,580	45.35%
Total votes		7,894	100%
Democratic hold			

=== District 11 ===
Incumbent Republican Gregory Lavelle has represented the 11th district since 2001.

Delaware House of Representatives 11th district general election, 2010
Party	Candidate	Votes	%
Republican	Gregory Lavelle (incumbent)	5,198	61.04%
Democratic	Joshua Samuel Schoenberg	3,318	38.96%
Total votes		8,516	100%
Republican hold			

=== District 12 ===
Incumbent Republican Deborah Hudson has represented the 12th district since 1994.

Delaware House of Representatives 12th district general election, 2010
Party	Candidate	Votes	%
Republican	Deborah Hudson (incumbent)	6,067	88.78%
Libertarian	James Christina	767	11.22%
Total votes		6,834	100%
Republican hold			

=== District 13 ===
Incumbent Democrat Larry Mitchell has represented the 13th district since 2006.

Delaware House of Representatives 13th district general election, 2010
Party	Candidate	Votes	%
Democratic	Larry Mitchell (incumbent)	4,345	90.80%
Blue Enigma	Jeffrey Brown	440	9.20%
Total votes		4,785	100%
Democratic hold			

=== District 14 ===
Incumbent Democratic Majority Leader Peter Schwartzkopf has represented the 14th district since 2002.

Delaware House of Representatives 14th district general election, 2010
Party	Candidate	Votes	%
Democratic	Peter Schwartzkopf (incumbent)	6,425	53.67%
Republican	Christopher Weeks	5,546	46.33%
Total votes		11,971	100%
Democratic hold			

=== District 15 ===
Incumbent Democrat Valerie Longhurst has represented the 15th district since 2004.

Delaware House of Representatives 15th district general election, 2010
Party	Candidate	Votes	%
Democratic	Valerie Longhurst (incumbent)	6,764	70.66%
Republican	James van Houten	2,659	27.78%
Libertarian	George Edward Barnett	150	1.57%
Total votes		9,573	100%
Democratic hold			

=== District 16 ===
Incumbent Democrat J.J. Johnson has represented the 16th district since 2004.

Delaware House of Representatives 16th district general election, 2010
Party	Candidate	Votes	%
Democratic	J.J. Johnson (incumbent)	5,328	100%
Total votes		5,328	100%
Democratic hold			

=== District 17 ===
Incumbent Democrat Michael Mulrooney has represented the 17th district since 1998.

Delaware House of Representatives 17th district general election, 2010
Party	Candidate	Votes	%
Democratic	Michael Mulrooney (incumbent)	5,108	100%
Total votes		5,108	100%
Democratic hold			

=== District 18 ===
Incumbent Democrat Michael Barbieri has represented the 18th district since 2008.

Delaware House of Representatives 18th district general election, 2010
Party	Candidate	Votes	%
Democratic	Michael Barbieri (incumbent)	3,115	52.97%
Republican	Terry Spence	2,677	45.52%
Working Families	Terry Spence	89	1.51%
Total votes		5,881	100%
Democratic hold			

=== District 19 ===
Incumbent Democratic House Speaker Robert Gilligan has represented the 19th district since 1972.

Delaware House of Representatives 19th district general election, 2010
Party	Candidate	Votes	%
Democratic	Robert Gilligan (incumbent)	4,527	73.37%
Republican	Vincent Ruff	1,643	26.63%
Total votes		6,170	100%
Democratic hold			

=== District 20 ===
Incumbent Republican Nick Manolakos has represented the 20th district since 2006.

Delaware House of Representatives 20th district general election, 2010
Party	Candidate	Votes	%
Republican	Nick Manolakos (incumbent)	5,469	62.45%
Democratic	Francis Swift Jr.	3,288	37.55%
Total votes		8,757	100%
Republican hold			

=== District 21 ===
Incumbent Republican Michael Ramone has represented the 21st district since 2008.

Delaware House of Representatives 21st district general election, 2010
Party	Candidate	Votes	%
Republican	Michael Ramone (incumbent)	5,356	100%
Total votes		5,356	100%
Republican hold			

=== District 22 ===
Incumbent Republicans Joseph Miró has represented the 22nd district since 1998.

Delaware House of Representatives 22nd district general election, 2010
Party	Candidate	Votes	%
Republican	Joseph Miró (incumbent)	5,767	67.33%
Democratic	David Ellis	2,798	32.67%
Total votes		8,565	100%
Republican hold			

=== District 23 ===
Incumbent Democrat Teresa Schooley has represented the 23rd district since 2004.

Delaware House of Representatives 23rd district general election, 2010
Party	Candidate	Votes	%
Democratic	Teresa Schooley (incumbent)	4,649	68.38%
Republican	Bill Stritzinger	2,150	31.62%
Total votes		6,799	100%
Democratic hold			

=== District 24 ===
Incumbent Republican William Orbele Jr. has represented the 24th district since 1976. Oberle didn't seek re-election and Democrat Edward Osienski won the open seat. Democratic primary

Delaware House of Representatives 24th district Democratic primary election, 2010
Party	Candidate	Votes	%
Democratic	Edward Osienski	581	70.85%
Democratic	Kay Wilde Gallogly	239	29.15%
Total votes		820	100%

General election

Delaware House of Representatives 24th district general election, 2010
Party	Candidate	Votes	%
Democratic	Edward Osienski	3,531	68.35%
Republican	Abraham Jones	1,635	31.65%
Total votes		5,166	100%
Democratic gain from Republican			

=== District 25 ===
Incumbent Democrat John Kowalko Jr. has represented the 25th district since 2006.

Delaware House of Representatives 25th district general election, 2010
Party	Candidate	Votes	%
Democratic	John Kowalko Jr. (incumbent)	3,402	65.54%
Republican	Gordon Winegar	1,789	34.46%
Total votes		5,191	100%
Democratic hold			

=== District 26 ===
Incumbent Democrat John Viola has represented the 26th district since 1998.

Delaware House of Representatives 26th district general election, 2010
Party	Candidate	Votes	%
Democratic	John Viola (incumbent)	4,819	96.67%
Republican	Hans-Erik Janco	166	3.33%
Total votes		4,985	100%
Democratic hold			

=== District 27 ===
Democratic primary

Delaware House of Representatives 27th district Democratic primary election, 2010
Party	Candidate	Votes	%
Democratic	Earl Jaques Jr. (incumbent)	781	64.28%
Democratic	James Maravelias	434	35.72%
Total votes		1,215	%

General election
Incumbent Democrat Earl Jaques Jr. has represented the 27th district since 2008.

Delaware House of Representatives 27th district general election, 2010
Party	Candidate	Votes	%
Democratic	Earl Jaques Jr. (incumbent)	4,654	64.94%
Republican	Jay Galloway	2,513	35.06%
Total votes		7,167	100%
Democratic hold			

=== District 28 ===
Incumbent Democrat William Carson Jr. has represented the 28th district since 2008.

Delaware House of Representatives 28th district general election, 2010
Party	Candidate	Votes	%
Democratic	William Carson Jr. (incumbent)	4,534	67.72%
Republican	Karen Minner	2,161	32.28%
Total votes		6,695	100%
Democratic hold			

=== District 29 ===
Incumbent Republican Pamela Thornburg has represented the 29th district since 2000. Thornburg didn't seek re-election and fellow Republican Lincoln Willis won the open seat. Republican primary

Delaware House of Representatives 29th district Republican primary election, 2010
Party	Candidate	Votes	%
Republican	Lincoln Willis	1,156	71.98%
Republican	George Phillips	450	28.02%
Total votes		1,606	100%

General election

Delaware House of Representatives 29th district general election, 2010
Party	Candidate	Votes	%
Republican	Lincoln Willis	5,176	58.49%
Democratic	John McCutchan	3,673	41.51%
Total votes		8,849	100%
Republican hold			

=== District 30 ===
Incumbent Republican William Outten has represented the 30th district since 2004.

Delaware House of Representatives 30th district general election, 2010
Party	Candidate	Votes	%
Republican	William Outten (incumbent)	5,514	100%
Total votes		5,514	100%
Republican hold			

=== District 31 ===
Incumbent Democrat Darryl Scott has represented the 31st district since 2008. Republican primary

Delaware House of Representatives 31st district Republican primary election, 2010
Party	Candidate	Votes	%
Republican	Ronald Smith	549	50.65%
Republican	Ronald Poliquin	535	49.35%
Total votes		1,084	100%

General election

Delaware House of Representatives 31st district general election, 2010
Party	Candidate	Votes	%
Democratic	Darryl Scott (incumbent)	3,487	59.12%
Republican	Ronald Smith	2,411	40.88%
Total votes		5,898	100%
Democratic hold			

=== District 32 ===
Incumbent Democrat Brad Bennett has represented the 32nd district since 2008.

Delaware House of Representatives 32nd district general election, 2010
Party	Candidate	Votes	%
Democratic	Brad Bennett (incumbent)	2,291	50.18%
Republican	Beth Buzzell Miller	1,995	43.69%
Independent Party	William McVay	204	4.47%
Libertarian	William McVay	76	1.66%
Total votes		4,566	100%
Democratic hold			

=== District 33 ===
Incumbent Democrat Robert Walls has represented the 33rd district since 2008. Walls lost re-election to Republican Harold Peterman. Republican primary

Delaware House of Representatives 33rd district Republican primary election, 2010
Party	Candidate	Votes	%
Republican	Harold Peterman	1,102	56.31%
Republican	Steven Rust	855	43.69%
Total votes		1,957	100%

General election

Delaware House of Representatives 33rd district general election, 2010
Party	Candidate	Votes	%
Republican	Harold Peterman	4,314	52.17%
Democratic	Robert Walls (incumbent)	3,955	47.83%
Total votes		8,269	100%
Republican gain from Democratic			

=== District 34 ===
Incumbent Republican Donald Blakey has represented the 34th district since 2006.

Delaware House of Representatives 34th district general election, 2010
Party	Candidate	Votes	%
Republican	Donald Blakey (incumbent)	5,015	61.66%
Democratic	Jill Fuchs	2,393	29.42%
Independent	Michael Tedesco	463	5.69%
Independent Party	Jonathan Marango	262	3.22%
Total votes		8,133	100%
Republican hold			

=== District 35 ===
Incumbent Republican David Wilson has represented the 35th district since 2008.

Delaware House of Representatives 35th district general election, 2010
Party	Candidate	Votes	%
Republican	David Wilson (incumbent)	4,719	70.29%
Democratic	James Westhoff	1,995	29.71%
Total votes		6,714	100%
Republican hold			

=== District 36 ===
Incumbent Republican V. George Carey has represented the 36th district since 1984. Carey didn't seek re-election and fellow Republican Harvey Kenton won the open seat.

Delaware House of Representatives 36th district general election, 2010
Party	Candidate	Votes	%
Republican	Harvey Kenton	5,229	54.30%
Democratic	C. Russell McCabe	4,400	45.70%
Total votes		9,629	100%
Republican hold			

=== District 37 ===
Incumbent Republican Ruth Briggs King has represented the th district since 2009.

Delaware House of Representatives 37th district general election, 2010
Party	Candidate	Votes	%
Republican	Ruth Briggs King (incumbent)	5,149	61.75%
Democratic	Frank Shade	3,189	38.25%
Total votes		8,338	100%
Republican hold			

=== District 38 ===
Incumbent Republican Gerald Hocker has represented the 38th district since 2002.

Delaware House of Representatives 38th district general election, 2010
Party	Candidate	Votes	%
Republican	Gerald Hocker (incumbent)	9,371	100%
Total votes		9,371	100%
Republican hold			

=== District 39 ===
Incumbent Republican Daniel Short has represented the 39th district since 2006.

Delaware House of Representatives 39th district general election, 2010
Party	Candidate	Votes	%
Republican	Daniel Short (incumbent)	4,562	100%
Total votes		4,562	100%
Republican hold			

=== District 40 ===
Incumbent Republican Clifford Lee has represented the 40th district since 1990.

Delaware House of Representatives 40th district general election, 2010
Party	Candidate	Votes	%
Republican	Clifford Lee (incumbent)	5,342	100%
Total votes		5,342	100%
Republican hold			

=== District 41 ===
Incumbent Democrat John Atkins has represented the 41st district since 2008.

Delaware House of Representatives 41st district general election, 2010
Party	Candidate	Votes	%
Democratic	John Atkins (incumbent)	4,865	55.34%
Republican	Gregory Hastings	3,926	44.66%
Total votes		8,791	100%
Democratic hold			
