= 2016 Delaware elections =

- November 8, 2016

Delaware's state elections were held on November 8, 2016. All 41 seats of the Delaware House of Representatives, 11 seats (out of 21) of the Delaware Senate, as well as the offices of Governor of Delaware, Lieutenant Governor of Delaware, and the State Insurance commissioner, were up for election.

== Federal ==
=== President ===
U.S. presidential election in Delaware, 2016
Party	Candidate	Votes	%
Democratic	Hillary Clinton	235,581	53.4
Republican	Donald Trump	185,103	41.9
Libertarian	Gary Johnson	14,751	3.3
Green	Jill Stein	6,100	1.4
Total votes		441,535	100.0

=== House of Representatives ===
Delaware's at-large congressional district election, 2016
Party	Candidate	Votes	%
Democratic	Lisa Blunt Rochester	219,887	55.52
Republican	Hans Reigle	172,290	40.96
Green	Mark J Perri	7,990	1.97
Libertarian	Scott Gesty	6,152	1.55
Total votes		406,319	100.0
Democratic hold			

== State ==
=== Constitutional officers ===
==== Governor ====
Delaware's gubernatorial election, 2016
Party	Candidate	Votes	%
Democratic	John Carney	234,341	58.34
Republican	Colin Bonini	157,442	39.18
Green	Andrew Groff	5,702	1.39
Libertarian	Sean Louis Goward	4,371	1.09
Total votes		401,856	100
Democratic hold			

==== Lieutenant governor ====
Delaware's lieutenant gubernatorial election, 2016
Party	Candidate	Votes	%
Democratic	Bethany Hall-Long	248,141	59.44
Delaware Republican Party	La Mar Gunn	169,291	40.56
Total votes		417,432	100.0
Democratic hold			

==== Insurance Commissioner ====
Insurance Commissioner results by county: Navarro: 50–60%; 60–70%; Cragg: 50–60%

Delaware's Insurance Commissioner election, 2016
Party	Candidate	Votes	%
Democratic	Trinidad Navarro	246,428	59.29
Republican	Jeff Cragg	169,228	40.71
Total votes		415,656	100.0
Democratic hold			

=== General Assembly ===
==== Summary ====
Senate

Affiliation	Candidates	Votes	Vote %	Seats Won	Seats After
Democratic	9	106,963	52.30%	6 (▼1)	11
Republican	8	97,080	47.47%	5 (▲1)	10
Green	1	462	0.23%	0	0
Total	18	204,505	100%	11	

House of Representatives

Affiliation	Candidates	Votes	Vote %	Seats Won
Democratic	35	226,082	59.51%	25 (▼1)
Republican	24	149,867	39.45%	16 (▲1)
Green	3	2,177	0.57%	0
Libertarian	2	1,546	0.41%	0
Delaware Independent	1	218	0.06%	0
Total	65	379,890	100%	41

==== Senate ====
District	Party	Incumbent	Status	Party	Candidate	Votes	%
1	Democratic	Harris McDowell III	Won	Democratic	Harris McDowell III	11,858	56.32%
1	Democratic	Harris McDowell III	Won	Republican	James Spadola	9,195	43.68%
5	Republican	Catherine Cloutier	Won	Republican	Catherine Cloutier	14,083	59.48%
5	Republican	Catherine Cloutier	Won	Democratic	Denise Bowers	9,596	40.52%
7	Democratic	Patti Blevins	Defeated	Republican	Anthony Delcollo	9,604	50.55%
7	Democratic	Patti Blevins	Defeated	Democratic	Patricia Blevins	9,398	49.45%
8	Democratic	David Sokola	Won	Democratic	David Sokola	8,862	50.82%
8	Democratic	David Sokola	Won	Republican	Meredith Chapman	8,113	46.52%
8	Democratic	David Sokola	Won	Green	David Chandler	462	2.66%
9	Democratic	Karen Peterson	Retired	Democratic	John Walsh	13,500	100.00%
12	Democratic	Nicole Poore	Won	Democratic	Nicole Poore	18,961	100.00%
13	Democratic	David McBride	Won	Democratic	David McBride	14,503	100.00%
14	Democratic	Bruce Ennis	Won	Democratic	Bruce Ennis	13,454	59.55%
14	Democratic	Bruce Ennis	Won	Republican	Carl Pace	9,138	40.45%
15	Republican	David G. Lawson	Won	Republican	David G. Lawson	15,036	100.00%
19	Republican	Brian Pettyjohn	Won	Republican	Brian Pettyjohn	14,003	100.00%
20	Republican	Gerald Hocker	Won	Republican	Gerald Hocker	17,908	72.39%
20	Republican	Gerald Hocker	Won	Democratic	Perry J. Mitchell	6,831	27.61%

==== House of Representatives ====
District	Party	Incumbent	Status	Party	Candidate	Votes	%
1	Democratic	Charles Potter Jr.	Won	Democratic	Charles Potter Jr.	8,901	100.00%
2	Democratic	Stephanie Bolden	Won	Democratic	Stephanie Bolden	6,256	100.00%
3	Democratic	Helene Keeley	Won	Democratic	Helene Keeley	6,060	100.00%
4	Democratic	Gerald Brady	Won	Democratic	Gerald Brady	9,565	100.00%
5	Democratic	Melanie George Smith	Won	Democratic	Melanie George Smith	8,280	100.00%
6	Democratic	Debra Heffernan	Won	Democratic	Debra Heffernan	9,545	100.00%
7	Democratic	Bryon Short	Won	Democratic	Bryon Short	8,277	90.10%
7	Democratic	Bryon Short	Won	Libertarian	Robert Wilson	909	9.90%
8	Democratic	S. Quinton Johnson	Won	Democratic	S. Quinton Johnson	8,703	100.00%
9	Democratic	Rebecca Walker	Retired	Republican	Kevin S. Hensley	7,812	60.37%
9	Democratic	Rebecca Walker	Retired	Democratic	Monique Johns	5,130	39.63%
10	Democratic	Dennis E. Williams	Defeated in primary	Democratic	Sean Matthews	6,654	60.74%
10	Democratic	Dennis E. Williams	Defeated in primary	Republican	Judith Travis	4,300	39.26%
11	Republican	Jeffrey Spiegelman	Won	Republican	Jeffrey Spiegelman	6,821	69.56%
11	Republican	Jeffrey Spiegelman	Won	Democratic	David L. Neilson	2,985	30.44%
12	Republican	Deborah Hudson	Won	Republican	Deborah Hudson	9,866	100.00%
13	Democratic	John Mitchell, Jr.	Won	Democratic	John Mitchell, Jr.	7,287	100.00%
14	Democratic	Peter Schwartzkopf	Won	Democratic	Peter Schwartzkopf	9,297	63.55%
14	Democratic	Peter Schwartzkopf	Won	Republican	James Louis Demartino	5,332	36.45%
15	Democratic	Valerie Longhurst	Won	Democratic	Valerie Longhurst	9,390	100.00%
16	Democratic	James Johnson	Won	Democratic	James Johnson	7,536	100.00%
17	Democratic	Michael Mulrooney	Won	Democratic	Michael Mulrooney	7,721	100.00%
18	Democratic	David Bentz	Won	Democratic	David Bentz	7,348	100.00%
19	Democratic	Kimberly Williams	Won	Democratic	Kimberly Williams	5,967	63.00%
19	Democratic	Kimberly Williams	Won	Republican	James Startzman	3,503	37.00%
20	Republican	Stephen Smyk	Won	Republican	Stephen Smyk	9,209	61.57%
20	Republican	Stephen Smyk	Won	Democratic	Barbara Vaughan	5,529	36.96%
20	Republican	Stephen Smyk	Won	Independent Party	Donald R. Ayotte	218	1.47%
21	Republican	Michael Ramone	Won	Republican	Michael Ramone	7,574	82.21%
21	Republican	Michael Ramone	Won	Green	David Mccorquodale	1,638	17.79%
22	Republican	Joseph Miro	Won	Republican	Joseph Miro	8,962	65.91%
22	Republican	Joseph Miro	Won	Democratic	Lanette Edwards	4,329	31.83%
22	Republican	Joseph Miro	Won	Green	Bernard August	306	2.26%
23	Democratic	Paul Baumbach	Won	Democratic	Paul Baumbach	6,550	100.00%
24	Democratic	Edward Osienski	Won	Democratic	Edward Osienski	6,406	68.72%
24	Democratic	Edward Osienski	Won	Republican	Timothy Conrad	2,915	31.28%
25	Democratic	John A. Kowalko Jr.	Won	Democratic	John A. Kowalko Jr.	5,123	68.55%
25	Democratic	John A. Kowalko Jr.	Won	Republican	Michael Nagorski	2,350	31.45%
26	Democratic	John Viola	Won	Democratic	John Viola	7,745	100.00%
27	Democratic	Earl Jaques, Jr.	Won	Democratic	Earl Jaques, Jr.	9,182	100.00%
28	Democratic	William Carson	Won	Democratic	William Carson	7,581	100.00%
29	Democratic	W. Charles Paradee III	Won	Democratic	W. Charles Paradee III	6,776	62.01%
29	Democratic	W. Charles Paradee III	Won	Republican	Janice Gallagher	3,918	35.85%
29	Democratic	W. Charles Paradee III	Won	Green	Ruth A. James	233	2.14%
30	Republican	William Outten	Won	Republican	William Outten	6,337	70.73%
30	Republican	William Outten	Won	Democratic	Charles Groce	2,623	29.27%
31	Democratic	Darryl Scott	Retired	Democratic	Sean M. Lynn	5,765	66.55%
31	Democratic	Darryl Scott	Retired	Republican	M. Jean Dowding	2,897	33.45%
32	Democratic	Andria Bennett	Won	Democratic	Andria Bennett	4,241	60.48%
32	Democratic	Andria Bennett	Won	Republican	Patricia McDaniel Foltz	2,771	39.52%
33	Republican	Charles S. Postles, Jr.	Won	Republican	Charles S. Postles, Jr.	5,780	57.51%
33	Republican	Charles S. Postles, Jr.	Won	Democratic	Karen Williams	4,271	42.49%
34	Republican	Donald A. Blakey	Defeated in primary	Republican	Lyndon D. Yearick	6,518	59.08%
34	Republican	Donald A. Blakey	Defeated in primary	Democratic	David Henderson	4,516	40.92%
35	Republican	David Wilson	Won	Republican	David Wilson	6,552	72.91%
35	Republican	David Wilson	Won	Democratic	Gary M. Wolfe	2,435	27.09%
36	Republican	Harvey Kenton	Won	Republican	Harvey Kenton	7,174	100.00%
37	Republican	Ruth Briggs King	Won	Republican	Ruth Briggs King	6,720	62.47%
37	Republican	Ruth Briggs King	Won	Democratic	Paulette Rappa	4,038	37.53%
38	Republican	Ronald Gray	Won	Republican	Ronald Gray	12,188	100.00%
39	Republican	Daniel Short	Won	Republican	Daniel Short	6,643	91.25%
39	Republican	Daniel Short	Won	Libertarian	James Brittingham	637	8.75%
40	Republican	Timothy Dukes	Won	Republican	Timothy Dukes	7,826	100.00%
41	Republican	Richard Collins	Won	Republican	Richard Collins	5,899	59.18%
41	Republican	Richard Collins	Won	Democratic	S. Bradley Connor	4,070	40.82%

Source: Delaware Department of Elections, Ballotpedia
