= 2004 Delaware House of Representatives election =

- November 2, 2004

All 41 seats in the Delaware House of Representatives 21 seats needed for a majority
	Majority party	Minority party
Leader	Terry Spence	Robert Gilligan
Party	Republican	Democratic
Leader's seat	18th- New Castle	19th - Wilmington
Last election	29	12
Seats before	29	12
Seats won	26	15
Seat change	▼3	▲3
Popular vote	177,320	143,645
Percentage	55.10%	44.63%
- Results: Democratic gain Republican hold Democratic hold
Speaker before election
Terry Spence
Republican
Elected Speaker
Terry Spence
Republican

An election was held on November 2, 2004, to elect all 41 members to Delaware's House of Representatives. The election coincided with elections for other offices, including for U.S. President, U.S. House of Representatives, Governor, Lieutenant Governor, and state senate. The primary election was held on September 11, 2004.

== Results ==
District	Incumbent	Party	Elected Representative	Party
1st	Dennis Williams	Dem	Dennis Williams	Dem
2nd	Hazel Plant	Dem	Hazel Plant	Dem
3rd	Helene Keeley	Dem	Helene Keeley	Dem
4th	Joseph G. Di Pinto	Rep	Joseph G. Di Pinto	Rep
5th	Melanie George	Dem	Melanie George	Dem
6th	David Ennis	Rep	Diana McWilliams	Dem
7th	Wayne Smith	Rep	Wayne Smith	Rep
8th	Bethany Hall-Long	Dem	Bethany Hall-Long	Dem
9th	Richard Cathcart	Rep	Richard Cathcart	Rep
10th	Robert Valihura Jr.	Rep	Robert Valihura Jr.	Rep
11th	Gregory Lavelle	Rep	Gregory Lavelle	Rep
12th	Deborah Hudson	Rep	Deborah Hudson	Rep
13th	John Van Sant III	Dem	John Van Sant III	Dem
14th	Peter Schwartzkopf	Dem	Peter Schwartzkopf	Dem
15th	Bruce Reynolds	Rep	Valerie Longhurst	Dem
16th	William Houghton	Dem	J.J. Johnson	Dem
17th	Michael Mulrooney	Dem	Michael Mulrooney	Dem
18th	Terry Spence	Rep	Terry Spence	Rep
19th	Robert Gilligan	Dem	Robert Gilligan	Dem
20th	Roger Roy	Rep	Roger Roy	Rep
21st	Pamela Maier	Rep	Pamela Maier	Rep
22nd	Joseph Miró	Rep	Joseph Miró	Rep
23rd	Timothy Boulden	Rep	Teresa Schooley	Dem
24th	William Orbele Jr.	Rep	William Orbele Jr.	Rep
25th	Stephanie Ulbrich	Rep	Stephanie Ulbrich	Rep
26th	John Viola	Dem	John Viola	Dem
27th	Vincet Lofink	Rep	Vincet Lofink	Rep
28th	Bruce Ennis	Dem	Bruce Ennis	Dem
29th	Pamela Thornburg	Rep	Pamela Thornburg	Rep
30th	George Quillen	Rep	William Outten	Rep
31st	Nancy Wagner	Rep	Nancy Wagner	Rep
32nd	Donna Stone	Rep	Donna Stone	Rep
33rd	Wallace Caulk Jr.	Rep	Wallace Caulk Jr.	Rep
34th	Gerald Buckworth	Rep	Gerald Buckworth	Rep
35th	J. Benjamin Ewing	Rep	J. Benjamin Ewing	Rep
36th	V. George Carey	Rep	V. George Carey	Rep
37th	Joseph Booth	Rep	Joseph Booth	Rep
38th	Gerald Hocker	Rep	Gerald Hocker	Rep
39th	Tina Fallon	Rep	Tina Fallon	Rep
40th	Clifford Lee	Rep	Clifford Lee	Rep
41st	John Atkins	Rep	John Atkins	Rep

=== Statewide ===
Party	Candi- dates	Votes	%	Seats	+/–
Republican	32	177,320	55.10%	26	▼3
Democratic	30	143,645	44.63%	15	▲3
Libertarian	4	874	0.27%	0	Steady
Total	66	321,839	100%	41	Steady

Popular vote
Republican	55.10%
Democratic	44.63%
Libertarian	0.27%

House seats
Republican	63.41%
Democratic	36.59%

== Predictions ==
Source	Ranking	As of
Rothenberg	Safe R	October 1, 2004

== Detailed Results ==
Results of the 2004 Delaware House of Representatives election by district:

=== District 1 ===
Incumbent Democrat Dennis Williams has represented the 1st district since 1994.

Delaware House of Representatives 1st district general election, 2004
Party	Candidate	Votes	%
Democratic	Dennis Williams (incumbent)	6,934	100%
Total votes		6,934	100%
Democratic hold			

=== District 2 ===
Incumbent Democrat Hazel Plant has represented the 2nd district since 2000. Democratic primary

Delaware House of Representatives 2nd district Democratic primary election, 2004
Party	Candidate	Votes	%
Democratic	Hazel Plant (incumbent)	822	45.16%
Democratic	Arthur Scott	641	35.22%
Democratic	Elizabeth Allen	357	19.62%
Total votes		1,820	100%

General election

Delaware House of Representatives 2nd district general election, 2004
Party	Candidate	Votes	%
Democratic	Hazel Plant (incumbent)	4,945	100%
Total votes		4,945	100%
Democratic hold			

=== District 3 ===
Incumbent Democrat Helene Keeley has represented the 3rd district and its predecessors since 1996. Democratic primary

Delaware House of Representatives 3rd district Democratic primary election, 2004
Party	Candidate	Votes	%
Democratic	Helene Keeley (incumbent)	1,042	72.97%
Democratic	Linda Cannon	386	27.03%
Total votes		1,428	100%

General election
Incumbent Democrat Helene Keeley has represented the 3rd district and its predecessors since 1996.

Delaware House of Representatives 3rd district general election, 2004
Party	Candidate	Votes	%
Democratic	Helene Keeley (incumbent)	4,825	100%
Total votes		4,825	100%
Democratic hold			

=== District 4 ===
Incumbent Republican Joseph G. Di Pinto has represented the 4th district since 1986.

Delaware House of Representatives 4th district general election, 2004
Party	Candidate	Votes	%
Republican	Joseph G. Di Pinto (incumbent)	5,506	57.80%
Democratic	Campbell Hay	4,020	42.20%
Total votes		9,526	100%
Republican hold			

=== District 5 ===
Incumbent Democrat Melanie George has represented the 5th district since 2002.

Delaware House of Representatives 5th district general election, 2004
Party	Candidate	Votes	%
Democratic	Melanie George (incumbent)	6,102	100%
Total votes		6,102	100%
Democratic hold			

=== District 6 ===
Incumbent Republican David Ennis has represented the 6th district since 1983. Ennis didn't seek re-election and Democrat Diana McWilliams won the open seat.

Democratic primary

Delaware House of Representatives 6th district Democratic primary election, 2004
Party	Candidate	Votes	%
Democratic	Diana McWilliams	763	66.41%
Democratic	James Hanby	386	33.59%
Total votes		1,149	100%

Republican primary

Delaware House of Representatives 6th district Republican primary election, 2004
Party	Candidate	Votes	%
Republican	Stacy Griggs	639	71.96%
Republican	Robert Jameson	249	28.04%
Total votes		888	100%

General election

Delaware House of Representatives 6th district general election, 2004
Party	Candidate	Votes	%
Democratic	Diana McWilliams	5,377	52.49%
Republican	Stacy Griggs	4,867	47.51%
Total votes		10,244	100%
Democratic gain from Republican			

=== District 7 ===
Incumbent Republican and Majority Leader Wayne Smith has represented the 7th district since 1990.

Delaware House of Representatives 7th district general election, 2004
Party	Candidate	Votes	%
Republican	Wayne Smith (incumbent)	6,539	60.54%
Democratic	Stephen Tanzer	4,176	38.66%
Libertarian	James Larsen	86	0.80%
Total votes		10,801	100%
Republican hold			

=== District 8 ===
Incumbent Democrat Bethany Hall-Long has represented the 8th district since 2002.

Delaware House of Representatives 8th district general election, 2004
Party	Candidate	Votes	%
Democratic	Bethany Hall-Long (incumbent)	8,228	100%
Total votes		8,228	100%
Democratic hold			

=== District 9 ===
Incumbent Republican Richard Cathcart has represented the 9th district since 1998.

Delaware House of Representatives 9th district general election, 2004
Party	Candidate	Votes	%
Republican	Richard Cathcart (incumbent)	7,500	64.36%
Democratic	Vincent Ascione Jr.	4,154	35.64%
Total votes		11,654	100%
Republican hold			

=== District 10 ===
Incumbent Republican Robert Valihura Jr. has represented the 10th district since 1998.

Delaware House of Representatives 10th district general election, 2004
Party	Candidate	Votes	%
Republican	Robert Valihura Jr. (incumbent)	5,354	56.92%
Democratic	Dennis Williams	3,849	40.92%
Libertarian	David Wood	203	2.16%
Total votes		9,406	100%
Republican hold			

=== District 11 ===
Incumbent Republican Gregory Lavelle has represented the 11th district since 2001.

Delaware House of Representatives 11th district general election, 2004
Party	Candidate	Votes	%
Republican	Gregory Lavelle (incumbent)	7,702	100%
Total votes		7,702	100%
Republican hold			

=== District 12 ===
Incumbent Republican Deborah Hudson has represented the 12th district since 1994.

Delaware House of Representatives 12th district general election, 2004
Party	Candidate	Votes	%
Republican	Deborah Hudson (incumbent)	6,790	65.22%
Democratic	Harry Gravell	3,621	34.78%
Total votes		10,411	100%
Republican hold			

=== District 13 ===
Incumbent Democrat John Van Sant III has represented the 13th district since 1982. Democratic primary

Delaware House of Representatives 13th district Democratic primary election, 2004
Party	Candidate	Votes	%
Democratic	John Van Sant III (incumbent)	770	66.90%
Democratic	W. P. Mahon	381	33.10%
Total votes		1,151	100%

General election

Delaware House of Representatives 13th district general election, 2004
Party	Candidate	Votes	%
Democratic	John Van Sant III (incumbent)	6,369	100%
Total votes		6,369	100%
Democratic hold			

=== District 14 ===
Incumbent Democrat Peter Schwartzkopf has represented the 14th district since 2002.

Delaware House of Representatives 14th district general election, 2004
Party	Candidate	Votes	%
Democratic	Peter Schwartzkopf (incumbent)	8,396	67.79%
Republican	Mary Spicer	3,880	31.33%
Libertarian	Everett Wodiska	110	0.89%
Total votes		12,386	100%
Democratic hold			

=== District 15 ===
Incumbent Republican Bruce Reynolds has represented the 15th district since 1988. Reynolds lost re-election to Democrat Valerie Longhurst.

Delaware House of Representatives 15th district general election, 2004
Party	Candidate	Votes	%
Democratic	Valerie Longhurst	5,187	50.14%
Republican	Bruce Reynolds (incumbent)	5,159	49.86%
Total votes		10,346	100%
Democratic gain from Republican			

=== District 16 ===
Incumbent Democrat William Houghton has represented the 16th district since 1982. Houghton didn't seek re-election to DemocratJ.J. Johnson won the open seat. Democratic primary

Delaware House of Representatives 16th district Democratic primary election, 2004
Party	Candidate	Votes	%
Democratic	J.J. Johnson	1,136	57.23%
Democratic	Herman Holloway Jr.	849	42.77%
Total votes		1,985	100%

General election

Delaware House of Representatives 16th district general election, 2004
Party	Candidate	Votes	%
Democratic	J.J. Johnson	5,823	81.54%
Republican	James Stockwell	1,318	18.46%
Total votes		7,141	100%
Democratic hold			

=== District 17 ===
Incumbent Democrat Michael Mulrooney has represented the 17th district since 1998. Democratic primary

Delaware House of Representatives 17th district Democratic primary election, 2004
Party	Candidate	Votes	%
Democratic	Michael Mulrooney (incumbent)	1,198	79.29%
Democratic	Joanne Viscount	313	20.71%
Total votes		1,511	100%

General election

Delaware House of Representatives 17th district general election, 2004
Party	Candidate	Votes	%
Democratic	Michael Mulrooney (incumbent)	6,590	81.89%
Republican	Phillip Simpkins Jr.	1,457	18.11%
Total votes		8,047	100%
Democratic hold			

=== District 18 ===
Incumbent Republican and House Speaker Terry Spence has represented the 18th district and its predecessors since 1980.

Delaware House of Representatives 18th district general election, 2004
Party	Candidate	Votes	%
Republican	Terry Spence (incumbent)	5,118	100%
Total votes		5,118	100%
Republican hold			

=== District 19 ===
Incumbent Democrat and Minority Leader Robert Gilligan has represented the 19th district since 1972.

Delaware House of Representatives 19th district general election, 2004
Party	Candidate	Votes	%
Democratic	Robert Gilligan (incumbent)	6,927	100%
Total votes		6,927	100%
Democratic hold			

=== District 20 ===
Incumbent Republican Roger Roy has represented the 20th district since 1976.

Delaware House of Representatives 20th district general election, 2004
Party	Candidate	Votes	%
Republican	Roger Roy (incumbent)	8,414	100%
Total votes		8,414	100%
Republican hold			

=== District 21 ===
Incumbent Republican Pamela Maier has represented the 21st district since 1994.

Delaware House of Representatives 21st district general election, 2004
Party	Candidate	Votes	%
Republican	Pamela Maier (incumbent)	6,663	69.00%
Democratic	Elton Brewer	2,994	31.00%
Total votes		9,657	100%
Republican hold			

=== District 22 ===
Incumbent Republicans Joseph Miró has represented the 22nd district since 1998.

Delaware House of Representatives 22nd district general election, 2004
Party	Candidate	Votes	%
Republican	Joseph Miró (incumbent)	8,036	100%
Total votes		8,036	100%
Republican hold			

=== District 23 ===
Incumbent Republican Timothy Boulden has represented the 23rd district since 1994. Boulden didn't seek re-election and Democrat Teresa Schooley won the open seat.

Delaware House of Representatives 23rd district general election, 2004
Party	Candidate	Votes	%
Democratic	Teresa Schooley	4,531	53.56%
Republican	Paul Pomeroy	3,929	46.44%
Total votes		8,460	100%
Democratic gain from Republican			

=== District 24 ===
Incumbent Republican William Orbele Jr. has represented the 24th district since 1976.

Delaware House of Representatives 24th district general election, 2004
Party	Candidate	Votes	%
Republican	William Orbele Jr. (incumbent)	4,932	100%
Total votes		4,932	100%
Republican hold			

=== District 25 ===
Incumbent Republican Stephanie Ulbrich has represented the 25th district since 1994.

Delaware House of Representatives 25th district general election, 2004
Party	Candidate	Votes	%
Republican	Stephanie Ulbrich (incumbent)	3,914	58.28%
Democratic	John Kowalko Jr.	2,802	41.72%
Total votes		6,716	100%
Republican hold			

=== District 26 ===
Incumbent Democrat John Viola has represented the 26th district since 1998.

Delaware House of Representatives 26th district general election, 2004
Party	Candidate	Votes	%
Democratic	John Viola (incumbent)	6,255	100%
Total votes		6,255	100%
Democratic hold			

=== District 27 ===
Incumbent Republican Vincet Lofink has represented the 27th district since 1990.

Delaware House of Representatives 27th district general election, 2004
Party	Candidate	Votes	%
Republican	Vincet Lofink (incumbent)	6,215	100%
Total votes		6,215	100%
Republican hold			

=== District 28 ===
Incumbent Democrat Bruce Ennis has represented the 28th district since 1982.

Delaware House of Representatives 28th district general election, 2004
Party	Candidate	Votes	%
Democratic	Bruce Ennis (incumbent)	6,020	100%
Total votes		6,020	100%
Democratic hold			

=== District 29 ===
Incumbent Republican Pamela Thornburg has represented the 29th district since 2000.

Delaware House of Representatives 29th district general election, 2004
Party	Candidate	Votes	%
Republican	Pamela Thornburg (incumbent)	5,086	59.40%
Democratic	Rafael Zaragoza	3,477	40.60%
Total votes		8,563	100%
Republican hold			

=== District 30 ===
Incumbent Republican George Quillen has represented the 30th district since 1982. Quillen didn't seek re-election and fellow Republican William Outten won the open seat. Democratic primary

Delaware House of Representatives 30th district Democratic primary election, 2004
Party	Candidate	Votes	%
Democratic	Kimberly Zeitler Robbins	504	51.38%
Democratic	Robert Price Jr.	477	48.62%
Total votes		981	100%

General election

Delaware House of Representatives 30th district general election, 2004
Party	Candidate	Votes	%
Republican	William Outten	4,644	59.26%
Democratic	Kimberly Zeitler Robbins	3,192	40.74%
Total votes		7,836	100%
Republican hold			

=== District 31 ===
Incumbent Republican Nancy Wagner has represented the 31st district since 1992.

Delaware House of Representatives 31st district general election, 2004
Party	Candidate	Votes	%
Republican	Nancy Wagner (incumbent)	5,307	100%
Total votes		5,307	100%
Republican hold			

=== District 32 ===
Incumbent Republican Donna Stone has represented the 32nd district since 1994.

Delaware House of Representatives 32nd district general election, 2004
Party	Candidate	Votes	%
Republican	Donna Stone (incumbent)	3,686	61.85%
Democratic	John McNeal Jr.	2,274	38.15%
Total votes		5,960	100%
Republican hold			

=== District 33 ===
Incumbent Republican Wallace Caulk Jr. has represented the 33rd district since 1984.

Delaware House of Representatives 33rd district general election, 2004
Party	Candidate	Votes	%
Republican	Wallace Caulk Jr. (incumbent)	6,567	100%
Total votes		6,567	100%
Republican hold			

=== District 34 ===
Incumbent Republican Gerald Buckworth has represented the 34th district since 1980.

Delaware House of Representatives 34th district general election, 2004
Party	Candidate	Votes	%
Republican	Gerald Buckworth (incumbent)	6,677	100%
Total votes		6,677	100%
Republican hold			

=== District 35 ===
Incumbent Republican J. Benjamin Ewing has represented the 35th district since 1986.

Delaware House of Representatives 35th district general election, 2004
Party	Candidate	Votes	%
Republican	J. Benjamin Ewing (incumbent)	5,295	91.77%
Libertarian	John Elliott	475	8.23%
Total votes		5,770	100%
Republican hold			

=== District 36 ===
Incumbent Republican V. George Carey has represented the 36th district since 1984. Democratic primary

Delaware House of Representatives 36th district Democratic primary election, 2004
Party	Candidate	Votes	%
Democratic	Brian Dolan	549	87.28%
Democratic	Deneen Louise Smith	80	12.72%
Total votes		629	100%

General election

Delaware House of Representatives 36th district general election, 2004
Party	Candidate	Votes	%
Republican	V. George Carey (incumbent)	5,640	60.25%
Democratic	Brian Dolan	3,721	39.75%
Total votes		9,361	100%
Republican hold			

=== District 37 ===
Incumbent Republican Joseph Booth has represented the 37th district since 2002.

Delaware House of Representatives 37th district general election, 2004
Party	Candidate	Votes	%
Republican	Joseph Booth (incumbent)	6,446	73.27%
Democratic	Nicholas Mirro	2,352	26.73%
Total votes		8,798	100%
Republican hold			

=== District 38 ===
Incumbent Republican Gerald Hocker has represented the 38th district since 2002.

Delaware House of Representatives 38th district general election, 2004
Party	Candidate	Votes	%
Republican	Gerald Hocker (incumbent)	7,653	61.45%
Democratic	Shirley Price	4,802	38.55%
Total votes		12,455	100%
Republican hold			

=== District 39 ===
Incumbent Republican Tina Fallon has represented the 39th district since 1978. Democratic primary

Delaware House of Representatives 39th district Democratic primary election, 2004
Party	Candidate	Votes	%
Democratic	Thomas Joel Chapman	239	60.97%
Democratic	Michael McGroerty	153	39.03%
Total votes		392	100%

General election

Delaware House of Representatives 39th district general election, 2004
Party	Candidate	Votes	%
Republican	Tina Fallon (incumbent)	4,082	58.25%
Democratic	Thomas Joel Chapman	2,926	41.75%
Total votes		7,008	100%
Republican hold			

=== District 40 ===
Incumbent Republican Clifford Lee has represented the 40th district since 1990.

Delaware House of Representatives 40th district general election, 2004
Party	Candidate	Votes	%
Republican	Clifford Lee (incumbent)	6,500	100%
Total votes		6,500	100%
Republican hold			

=== District 41 ===
Incumbent Republican John Atkins has represented the 41st district since 2002.

Delaware House of Representatives 41st district general election, 2004
Party	Candidate	Votes	%
Republican	John Atkins (incumbent)	6,444	69.89%
Democratic	Barbara Lifflander	2,776	30.11%
Total votes		9,220	100%
Republican hold			
