= 2002 Delaware House of Representatives election =

- November 5, 2002

All 41 seats in the Delaware House of Representatives 21 seats needed for a majority
	Majority party	Minority party
Leader	Terry Spence	Robert Gilligan
Party	Republican	Democratic
Leader's seat	18th- New Castle	19th - Wilmington
Last election	26	15
Seats before	26	15
Seats won	29	12
Seat change	▲3	▼3
Popular vote	126,043	80,208
Percentage	60.65%	38.59%
- Results: Republican gain Republican hold Democratic hold
Speaker before election
Terry Spence
Republican
Elected Speaker
Terry Spence
Republican

The 2002 Delaware House of Representatives election was held on November 5, 2002, to elect all 41 members of Delaware's House of Representatives. The election coincided with elections for other offices, including for U.S. Senate, U.S. House of Representatives, and state senate. The primary election was held on September 7, 2002.

== Results ==
District	Incumbent	Party	Elected Representative	Party
1st	Dennis Williams	Dem	Dennis Williams	Dem
2nd	Al Plant Sr.	Dem	Hazel Plant	Dem
2nd	Arthur Scott (Note: Redistricted from the 3rd district.)	Dem	Hazel Plant	Dem
3rd	Helene Keeley (Note: Redistricted from the 5th district.)	Dem	Helene Keeley	Dem
4th	Joseph G. Di Pinto	Rep	Joseph G. Di Pinto	Rep
5th	New Seat		Melanie George	Dem
6th	David Ennis	Rep	David Ennis	Rep
7th	Wayne Smith	Rep	Wayne Smith	Rep
7th	David Brady (Note: Redistricted from the 8th district.)	Dem	Wayne Smith	Rep
8th	New Seat		Bethany Hall-Long	Dem
9th	Richard Cathcart	Rep	Richard Cathcart	Rep
10th	Robert Valihura Jr.	Rep	Robert Valihura Jr.	Rep
11th	Gregory Lavelle	Rep	Gregory Lavelle	Rep
12th	Deborah Hudson	Rep	Deborah Hudson	Rep
13th	John Van Sant III	Dem	John Van Sant III	Dem
14th	New Seat		Peter Schwartzkopf	Dem
15th	Bruce Reynolds	Rep	Bruce Reynolds	Rep
16th	William Houghton	Dem	William Houghton	Dem
17th	Michael Mulrooney	Dem	Michael Mulrooney	Dem
18th	Terry Spence	Rep	Terry Spence	Rep
19th	Robert Gilligan	Dem	Robert Gilligan	Dem
20th	Roger Roy	Rep	Roger Roy	Rep
21st	Pamela Maier	Rep	Pamela Maier	Rep
22nd	Joseph Miró	Rep	Joseph Miró	Rep
23rd	Timothy Boulden	Rep	Timothy Boulden	Rep
23rd	Richard DiLiberto (Note: Redistricted from the 14th district.)	Dem	Timothy Boulden	Rep
24th	William Orbele Jr.	Rep	William Orbele Jr.	Rep
25th	Stephanie Ulbrich	Rep	Stephanie Ulbrich	Rep
26th	John Viola	Dem	John Viola	Dem
27th	Vincet Lofink	Rep	Vincet Lofink	Rep
28th	Bruce Ennis	Dem	Bruce Ennis	Dem
29th	Pamela Thornburg	Rep	Pamela Thornburg	Rep
30th	George Quillen	Rep	George Quillen	Rep
31st	Nancy Wagner	Rep	Nancy Wagner	Rep
32nd	Donna Stone	Rep	Donna Stone	Rep
33rd	Wallace Caulk Jr.	Rep	Wallace Caulk Jr.	Rep
34th	Gerald Buckworth	Rep	Gerald Buckworth	Rep
35th	J. Benjamin Ewing	Rep	J. Benjamin Ewing	Rep
36th	V. George Carey	Rep	V. George Carey	Rep
37th	John Schroeder	Dem	Joseph Booth	Rep
38th	Shirley Price	Dem	Gerald Hocker	Rep
39th	Tina Fallon	Rep	Tina Fallon	Rep
40th	Clifford Lee	Rep	Clifford Lee	Rep
41st	Charles West	Dem	John Atkins	Rep

=== Statewide ===
Party	Candi- dates	Votes	%	Seats	+/–
Republican	33	126,043	60.65%	29	▲3
Democratic	28	80,208	38.59%	12	▼3
Libertarian	6	761	0.37%	0	Steady
Independent	4	681	0.33%	0	Steady
Unaffialiated	1	132	0.06%	0	Steady
Total	72	207,825	100%	41	Steady

Popular vote
Republican	60.65%
Democratic	38.59%
Libertarian	0.37%
Independent	0.33%
Unaffaliated	0.06%

House seats
Republican	%
Democratic	%

== Predictions ==
Source	Ranking	As of
The Cook; Political Report	Likely R	October 4, 2002

== Detailed Results ==
Results of the 2002 Delaware House of Representatives election by district:

=== District 1 ===
Incumbent Democrat Dennis Williams has represented the 1st district since 1994. Democratic primary

Delaware House of Representatives 1st district Democratic primary election, 2002
Party	Candidate	Votes	%
Democratic	Dennis Williams (incumbent)	1,423	72.49%
Democratic	Samuel Pratcher Jr.	540	27.51%
Total votes		1,963	100%

General election

Delaware House of Representatives 1st district general election, 2002
Party	Candidate	Votes	%
Democratic	Dennis Williams (incumbent)	4,148	100%
Total votes		4,148	100%
Democratic hold			

=== District 2 ===
The new 2nd district includes the homes of incumbent Democrats Al Plant Sr., who has represented the 2nd district since 1975, and Arthur Scott who has represented the 3rd district since 1994. Plant Sr. didn't seek re-election. Hazel Plant defeated Scott in the Democratic primary and went on to win the general election. Democratic primary

Delaware House of Representatives 2nd district Democratic primary election, 2002
Party	Candidate	Votes	%
Democratic	Hazel Plant	478	30.33%
Democratic	Arthur Scott (incumbent)	466	29.57%
Democratic	Elizabeth Allen	266	16.88%
Democratic	Gary Hutt	216	13.71%
Democratic	Daniel Larnick	150	9.52%
Total votes		1,576	100%

General election

Delaware House of Representatives 2nd district general election, 2002
Party	Candidate	Votes	%
Democratic	Hazel Plant	2,562	100%
Total votes		2,562	100%
Democratic hold			

=== District 3 ===
The new 3rd district includes the home of incumbent Democrat Helene Keeley, who has represented the 5th district since 1996. Keeley was re-elected here. Democratic primary

Delaware House of Representatives 3rd district Democratic primary election, 2002
Party	Candidate	Votes	%
Democratic	Helene Keeley (incumbent)	685	78.11%
Democratic	Linda Cannon	192	21.89%
Total votes		877	100%

General election

Delaware House of Representatives 3rd district general election, 2002
Party	Candidate	Votes	%
Democratic	Helene Keeley (incumbent)	2,153	73.66%
Republican	Calvin Brown	770	26.34%
Total votes		2,923	100%
Democratic hold			

=== District 4 ===
Incumbent Republican Joseph G. Di Pinto has represented the 4th district since 1986.

Delaware House of Representatives 4th district general election, 2002
Party	Candidate	Votes	%
Republican	Joseph G. Di Pinto (incumbent)	5,200	100%
Total votes		5,200	100%
Republican hold			

=== District 5 ===
The new 5th district is located in New Castle County and includes much of Bear. The district has no incumbent. Democrat Melanie George won the open seat. Democratic primary

Delaware House of Representatives 5th district Democratic primary election, 2002
Party	Candidate	Votes	%
Democratic	Melanie George	376	91.93%
Democratic	William McMurray	33	8.07%
Total votes		409	100%

General election

Delaware House of Representatives 5th district general election, 2002
Party	Candidate	Votes	%
Democratic	Melanie George	2,777	100%
Total votes		2,777	100%
Democratic win (new seat)			

=== District 6 ===
Incumbent Republican David Ennis has represented the 6th district since 1983.

Delaware House of Representatives 6th district general election, 2002
Party	Candidate	Votes	%
Republican	David Ennis (incumbent)	4,228	62.87%
Democratic	David Dennett	2,372	35.27%
Libertarian	Carl Dunn	125	1.86%
Total votes		6,725	100%
Republican hold			

=== District 7 ===
The new 7th district includes the home of incumbent Republican, who Wayne Smith has represented the 7th district since 1990, and Democrat David Brady, who has represented the 8th district since 1982. Smith defeated Brady in the general election.

Delaware House of Representatives 7th district general election, 2002
Party	Candidate	Votes	%
Republican	Wayne Smith (incumbent)	4,278	52.07%
Democratic	David Brady (incumbent)	3,864	47.03%
Libertarian	Barbara Beeghley	74	0.90%
Total votes		8,216	100%
Republican hold			

=== District 8 ===
The new 8th district is located in southwestern New Castle County and northwestern Kent County. The district which includes Middletown, Townsend, and Clayton has no incumbent. Democrat Bethany Hall-Long won the open seat.

Delaware House of Representatives 8th district general election, 2002
Party	Candidate	Votes	%
Democratic	Bethany Hall-Long	3,591	60.73%
Republican	William Hutchinson	2,322	39.27%
Total votes		5,913	100%
Democratic win (new seat)			

=== District 9 ===
Incumbent Republican Richard Cathcart has represented the 9th district since 1998.

Delaware House of Representatives 9th district general election, 2002
Party	Candidate	Votes	%
Republican	Richard Cathcart (incumbent)	4,921	100%
Total votes		4,921	100%
Republican hold			

=== District 10 ===
Incumbent Republican Robert Valihura Jr. has represented the 10th district since 1998.

Delaware House of Representatives 10th district general election, 2002
Party	Candidate	Votes	%
Republican	Robert Valihura Jr. (incumbent)	4,801	91.90%
Libertarian	George Smith	423	8.10%
Total votes		5,224	100%
Republican hold			

=== District 11 ===
Incumbent Republican Gregory Lavelle has represented the 11th district since 2001.

Delaware House of Representatives 11th district general election, 2002
Party	Candidate	Votes	%
Republican	Gregory Lavelle (incumbent)	4,961	65.73%
Democratic	Michael Paul	2,586	34.27%
Total votes		7,547	100%
Republican hold			

=== District 12 ===
Incumbent Republican Deborah Hudson has represented the 12th district since 1994.

Delaware House of Representatives 12th district general election, 2002
Party	Candidate	Votes	%
Republican	Deborah Hudson (incumbent)	5,939	100%
Total votes		5,939	100%
Republican hold			

=== District 13 ===
Incumbent Democrat John Van Sant III has represented the 13th district since 1982. Democratic primary

Delaware House of Representatives 13th district Democratic primary election, 2002
Party	Candidate	Votes	%
Democratic	John Van Sant III (incumbent)	648	77.70%
Democratic	William Mahon	186	22.30%
Total votes		834	100%

General election

Delaware House of Representatives 13th district general election, 2002
Party	Candidate	Votes	%
Democratic	John Van Sant III (incumbent)	3,894	100%
Total votes		3,894	100%
Democratic hold			

=== District 14 ===
The new 14th district is located in Sussex County and includes much of Rehoboth Beach. The district has no incumbent. Democrat Peter Schwartzkopf won the open seat. Republican primary

Delaware House of Representatives 5th district Republican primary election, 2002
Party	Candidate	Votes	%
Republican	Michael Meoli	884	60.59%
Republican	Harry Crystal	575	39.41%
Total votes		1,459	100%

General election

Delaware House of Representatives 14th district general election, 2002
Party	Candidate	Votes	%
Democratic	Peter Schwartzkopf	4,530	53.09%
Republican	Michael Meoli	3,932	46.09%
Libertarian	Everett Wodiska	70	0.82%
Total votes		8,532	100%
Democratic win (new seat)			

=== District 15 ===
Incumbent Republican Bruce Reynolds has represented the 15th district since 1988.

Delaware House of Representatives 15th district general election, 2002
Party	Candidate	Votes	%
Republican	Bruce Reynolds (incumbent)	2,781	54.74%
Democratic	Valerie Longhurst	2,299	45.26%
Total votes		5,080	100%
Republican hold			

=== District 16 ===
Incumbent Democrat William Houghton has represented the 16th district since 1982. Democratic primary

Delaware House of Representatives 16th district Democratic primary election, 2002
Party	Candidate	Votes	%
Democratic	William Houghton (incumbent)	863	50.88%
Democratic	Herman Holloway Jr.	833	49.12%
Total votes		1,696	100%

General election

Delaware House of Representatives 16th district general election, 2002
Party	Candidate	Votes	%
Democratic	William Houghton (incumbent)	3,723	100%
Total votes		3,723	100%
Democratic hold			

=== District 17 ===
Incumbent Democrat Michael Mulrooney has represented the 17th district since 1998.

Delaware House of Representatives 17th district general election, 2002
Party	Candidate	Votes	%
Democratic	Michael Mulrooney (incumbent)	4,340	100%
Total votes		4,340	100%
Democratic hold			

=== District 18 ===
Incumbent Republican and House Speaker Terry Spence has represented the 18th district and its predecessors since 1980.

Delaware House of Representatives 18th district general election, 2002
Party	Candidate	Votes	%
Republican	Terry Spence (incumbent)	3,221	100%
Total votes		3,221	100%
Republican hold			

=== District 19 ===
Incumbent Democrat and Minority Leader Robert Gilligan has represented the 19th district since 1972.

Delaware House of Representatives 19th district general election, 2002
Party	Candidate	Votes	%
Democratic	Robert Gilligan (incumbent)	4,661	100%
Total votes		4,661	100%
Democratic hold			

=== District 20 ===
Incumbent Republican Roger Roy has represented the 20th district since 1976.

Delaware House of Representatives 20th district general election, 2002
Party	Candidate	Votes	%
Republican	Roger Roy (incumbent)	6,352	100%
Total votes		6,352	100%
Republican hold			

=== District 21 ===
Incumbent Republican Pamela Maier has represented the 21st district since 1994.

Delaware House of Representatives 21st district general election, 2002
Party	Candidate	Votes	%
Republican	Pamela Maier (incumbent)	5,266	100%
Total votes		5,266	100%
Republican hold			

=== District 22 ===
Incumbent Republicans Joseph Miró has represented the 22nd district since 1998.

Delaware House of Representatives 22nd district general election, 2002
Party	Candidate	Votes	%
Republican	Joseph Miró (incumbent)	5,872	100%
Total votes		5,872	100%
Republican hold			

=== District 23 ===
The new 23rd district includes the homes of Incumbent Republican Timothy Boulden, who has represented the 23rd district since 1994, and Democrat Richard DiLiberto, who has represented the 14th district since 1992. DiLiberto retired to run for the state senate and Boulden was re-elected here.

Delaware House of Representatives 23rd district general election, 2002
Party	Candidate	Votes	%
Republican	Timothy Boulden (incumbent)	3,228	53.01%
Democratic	Judith Hendricks	2,861	46.99%
Total votes		6,089	100%
Republican hold			

=== District 24 ===
Incumbent Republican William Orbele Jr. has represented the 24th district since 1976.

Delaware House of Representatives 24th district general election, 2002
Party	Candidate	Votes	%
Republican	William Orbele Jr. (incumbent)	3,010	100%
Total votes		3,010	100%
Republican hold			

=== District 25 ===
Incumbent Republican Stephanie Ulbrich has represented the 25th district since 1994.

Delaware House of Representatives 25th district general election, 2002
Party	Candidate	Votes	%
Republican	Stephanie Ulbrich (incumbent)	2,581	60.26%
Democratic	Stephanie McClellan	1,702	39.74%
Total votes		4,283	100%
Republican hold			

=== District 26 ===
Incumbent Democrat John Viola has represented the 26th district since 1998.

Delaware House of Representatives 26th district general election, 2002
Party	Candidate	Votes	%
Democratic	John Viola (incumbent)	3,123	95.94%
Independent	J. Oliver Lannak	132	4.06%
Total votes		3,255	100%
Democratic hold			

=== District 27 ===
Incumbent Republican Vincet Lofink has represented the 27th district since 1990.

Delaware House of Representatives 27th district general election, 2002
Party	Candidate	Votes	%
Republican	Vincet Lofink (incumbent)	3,808	100%
Total votes		3,808	100%
Republican hold			

=== District 28 ===
Incumbent Democrat Bruce Ennis has represented the 28th district since 1982.

Delaware House of Representatives 28th district general election, 2002
Party	Candidate	Votes	%
Democratic	Bruce Ennis (incumbent)	2,678	59.87%
Republican	Mark Pugh	1,754	39.21%
Libertarian	Terri Lewis	41	0.92%
Total votes		4,473	100%
Democratic hold			

=== District 29 ===
Incumbent Republican Pamela Thornburg has represented the 29th district since 2000.

Delaware House of Representatives 29th district general election, 2002
Party	Candidate	Votes	%
Republican	Pamela Thornburg (incumbent)	3,445	71.22%
Democratic	Dess Stokes	1,392	28.78%
Total votes		4,837	100%
Republican hold			

=== District 30 ===
Incumbent Republican George Quillen has represented the 30th district since 1982.

Delaware House of Representatives 30th district general election, 2002
Party	Candidate	Votes	%
Republican	George Quillen (incumbent)	3,352	66.42%
Democratic	Rose Pritchett	1,695	33.58%
Total votes		5,047	100%
Republican hold			

=== District 31 ===
Incumbent Republican Nancy Wagner has represented the 31st district since 1992.

Delaware House of Representatives 31st district general election, 2002
Party	Candidate	Votes	%
Republican	Nancy Wagner (incumbent)	3,162	63.15%
Democratic	Prameela Kaza	1,845	36.85%
Total votes		5,007	100%
Republican hold			

=== District 32 ===
Incumbent Republican Donna Stone has represented the 32nd district since 1994.

Delaware House of Representatives 32nd district general election, 2002
Party	Candidate	Votes	%
Republican	Donna Stone (incumbent)	2,192	55.96%
Democratic	William Daisey	1,697	43.32%
Libertarian	J. Lawrence	28	0.71%
Total votes		3,917	100%
Republican hold			

=== District 33 ===
Incumbent Republican Wallace Caulk Jr. has represented the 33rd district since 1984.

Delaware House of Representatives 33rd district general election, 2002
Party	Candidate	Votes	%
Republican	Wallace Caulk Jr. (incumbent)	3,487	61.72%
Democratic	D. Ken Cox	2,163	38.28%
Total votes		5,650	100%
Republican hold			

=== District 34 ===
Incumbent Republican Gerald Buckworth has represented the 34th district since 1980.

Delaware House of Representatives 34th district general election, 2002
Party	Candidate	Votes	%
Republican	Gerald Buckworth (incumbent)	4,560	100%
Total votes		4,560	100%
Republican hold			

=== District 35 ===
Incumbent Republican J. Benjamin Ewing has represented the 35th district since 1986.

Delaware House of Representatives 35th district general election, 2002
Party	Candidate	Votes	%
Republican	J. Benjamin Ewing (incumbent)	3,512	92.64%
Independent Party	Quentin Wilkerson Sr.	279	7.36%
Total votes		3,791	100%
Republican hold			

=== District 36 ===
Incumbent Republican V. George Carey has represented the 36th district since 1984.

Delaware House of Representatives 36th district general election, 2002
Party	Candidate	Votes	%
Republican	V. George Carey (incumbent)	4,134	66.73%
Democratic	Douglas Ingram	1,812	29.25%
Independent Party	John Stenger	249	4.02%
Total votes		6,195	100%
Republican hold			

=== District 37 ===
Incumbent Democrat John Schroeder has represented the 37th district since 1989. Schroeder lost re-election to Republican Joseph Booth.

Delaware House of Representatives 37th district general election, 2002
Party	Candidate	Votes	%
Republican	Joseph Booth	3,269	50.34%
Democratic	John Schroeder (incumbent)	3,225	49.66%
Total votes		6,494	100%
Republican gain from Democratic			

=== District 38 ===
Incumbent Democrat Shirley Price has represented the 38th district since 1997. Price lost re-election to Republican Gerald Hocker.

Delaware House of Representatives 38th district general election, 2002
Party	Candidate	Votes	%
Republican	Gerald Hocker	4,436	49.78%
Democratic	Shirley Price (incumbent)	4,379	49.14%
Independent Party	Donna Layfield Sinnamon	97	1.09%
Total votes		8,912	100%
Republican gain from Democratic			

=== District 39 ===
Incumbent Republican Tina Fallon has represented the 39th district since 1978.

Delaware House of Representatives 39th district general election, 2002
Party	Candidate	Votes	%
Republican	Tina Fallon (incumbent)	3,176	66.95%
Democratic	Michael McGroerty	1,568	33.05%
Total votes		4,744	100%
Republican hold			

=== District 40 ===
Incumbent Republican Clifford Lee has represented the 40th district since 1990.

Delaware House of Representatives 40th district general election, 2002
Party	Candidate	Votes	%
Republican	Clifford Lee (incumbent)	4,196	100%
Total votes		4,196	100%
Republican hold			

=== District 41 ===
Incumbent Democrat Charles West has represented the 41st district since 1979. West didn't seek re-election and Republican John Atkins won the open seat. Democratic primary

Delaware House of Representatives 41st district Democratic primary election, 2002
Party	Candidate	Votes	%
Democratic	Donald Ward	697	67.28%
Democratic	Lynn Bullock	339	32.72%
Total votes		1,036	100%

General election

Delaware House of Representatives 41st district general election, 2002
Party	Candidate	Votes	%
Republican	John Atkins	3,897	59.76%
Democratic	Donald Ward	2,568	39.38%
Independent Party	M. Joyce Thurmon	56	0.86%
Total votes		6,521	100%
Republican gain from Democratic			
