= 2016 United States House of Representatives election in Delaware =

2016 United States House of Representatives election in Delaware, At-large district
- November 8, 2016
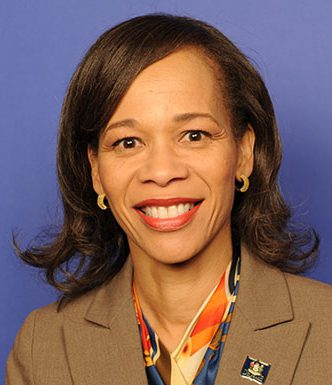

Nominee	Lisa Blunt Rochester	Hans Reigle
Party	Democratic	Republican
Popular vote	233,554	172,301
Percentage	55.52%	40.96%
- Rochester: 40–50% 50–60% 60–70% 70–80% 80–90% >90% Reigle: 40–50% 50–60% 60–70% 70–80% No votes
U.S. Representative before election
John Carney
Democratic
Elected U.S. Representative
Lisa Blunt Rochester
Democratic

The 2016 United States House of Representatives election in Delaware was held on November 8, 2016, to elect the U.S. representative from the state of Delaware from Delaware's at-large congressional district. The election coincided with the 2016 U.S. presidential election, as well as other elections to the House of Representatives, elections to the United States Senate and various state and local elections. The primaries were held on September 13.

Democrat John Carney, the incumbent representative, did not run for reelection, instead successfully running for governor of Delaware. Democrat Lisa Blunt Rochester won the open seat on November 8.

When she was sworn into office on January 3, 2017, she became the first woman and the first African-American to represent Delaware in Congress.

== Democratic primary ==
Democrats Bryon Short, a member of the Delaware House of Representatives from Highland Woods, and Bryan Townsend, a member of the Delaware Senate from Newark, Delaware, had previously said they would run for the seat if Carney ran for governor. Following Carney's announcement that he would run for governor, both Short and Townsend declared their candidacies in the race to succeed him. Lisa Blunt Rochester, the former State Labor Secretary, also joined the race. Short later withdrew from the race, citing difficulties fundraising. Rochester won the primary with 43.8% of the vote.

=== Candidates ===
==== Nominee ====
- Lisa Blunt Rochester, former state labor secretary, former state personnel director, and former CEO of the Metropolitan Wilmington Urban League

==== Eliminated in primary ====
- Sean Barney, former policy director for Governor Jack Markell and nominee for state treasurer in 2014
- Mike Miller, businessman and perennial candidate
- Bryan Townsend, state senator

==== Withdrawn ====
- Bryon Short, state representative

==== Declined ====
- Chris Bullock, president of the New Castle County Council (running for re-election)
- John Carney, incumbent U.S. representative (running for governor)
- Marla Blunt Carter, college professor and former congressional aide
- Jack Markell, governor of Delaware
- Brenda Mayrack, former executive director of the Delaware Democratic Party and nominee for state auditor in 2014
- Collin O'Mara, president and CEO of the National Wildlife Federation and former State Natural Resources and Environmental Control Secretary
- Dennis E. Williams, former state representative and nominee in 1996 and 1998

=== Endorsements ===
Sean Barney
- Lawrence Lessig, law professor
Lisa Blunt Rochester

Individuals

- Andria Bennett, state representative
- Stephanie T. Bolden, state representative
- Debra Heffernan, state representative
- Margaret Rose Henry, state senator
- Valerie Longhurst, Delaware House Majority Leader
- Kimberly Williams, state representative

Organizations

- EMILY's List
- National Women's Political Caucus
Bryan Townsend
- Donald Morton, civil rights leader
- Coby Owens, social justice activist, CEO of Youth Caucus of America, and 2016 delegate for Bernie Sanders
- Karen E. Peterson, state senator
Bryon Short (withdrawn)
- Stephanie Bolden, state representative
- Gerald Brady, state representative
- William Carson, Jr., state representative
- Debra Heffernan, state representative
- Earl Jaques, Jr., state representative
- Quinn Johnson, state representative
- John Kowalko, state representative
- Sean Lynn, state representative
- Sean Matthews, state representative
- Trey Paradee, state representative
- Peter Schwartzkopf, Speaker of the Delaware House of Representatives
- Melanie G. Smith, state representative

==== Polling ====
Poll source	Date(s) administered	Sample size	Margin of error	Sean Barney	Lisa Blunt Rochester	Mike Miller	Bryan Townsend	Scott Walker	Elias Weir	Other	Undecided
Fairleigh Dickinson University	July 20–24, 2016	344	± 5.3%	4%	11%	9%	11%	6%	0%	1%	52%
Gravis Marketing	April 17–18, 2016	1,026	± 3.1%	12%	8%	—	19%	—	—	—	61%

=== Results ===
Democratic primary results
Party	Candidate	Votes	%
Democratic	Lisa Blunt Rochester	27,920	43.8
Democratic	Bryan Townsend	15,847	24.8
Democratic	Sean Barney	12,891	20.2
Democratic	Micheal Miller	3,500	5.5
Democratic	Scott Walker	3,156	4.9
Democratic	Elias Weir	480	0.8
Total votes		63,794	100.0

== Republican primary ==
Hans Reigle, a former mayor of Wyoming, Delaware, and the former chairman of the Kent County Republican Party, ran unopposed on the ballot for the Republican nomination.

=== Candidates ===
==== Nominee ====
- Hans Reigle, former mayor of Wyoming and former chairman of the Kent County Republican Party

==== Failed to file ====
- Rose Izzo, conservative activist, candidate for the seat in 2010 and 2012 and nominee in 2014 (never filed for primary)

=== Polling ===
Poll source	Date(s) administered	Sample size	Margin of error	Hans Reigle	Other	Undecided
Fairleigh Dickinson University	July 20–24, 2016	224	± 6.6%	26%	14%	55%

== General election ==
=== Predictions ===
Source	Ranking	As of
The Cook Political Report	Safe D	November 7, 2016
Daily Kos Elections	Safe D	November 7, 2016
Rothenberg	Safe D	November 3, 2016
Sabato's Crystal Ball	Safe D	November 7, 2016
RCP	Safe D	October 31, 2016

=== Polling ===
Poll source	Date(s) administered	Sample size	Margin of error	Lisa Blunt Rochester (D)	Hans Reigle (R)	Other	Undecided
University of Delaware	September 16–28, 2016	900	± 3.8%	46%	26%	11%	18%

=== Results ===
Delaware's at-large congressional district, 2016
Party	Candidate	Votes	%	±%
Democratic	Lisa Blunt Rochester	233,554	55.52%	−3.74%
Republican	Hans Reigle	172,301	40.96%	+4.20%
Green	Mark J. Perri	8,326	1.97%	−0.10%
Libertarian	Scott Gesty	6,436	1.55%	−0.36%
Total votes		420,617	100.0%	N/A
Democratic hold				

By county

County	Lisa Blunt Rochester Democratic		Hans Reigle Republican		All Others	
County	#	%	#	%	#	%
New Castle	158,803	63.97%	80,356	32.37%	9,092	3.66%
Kent	33,113	46.59%	35,353	49.75%	2,601	3.66%
Sussex	41,638	41.08%	56,592	55.83%	3,134	2.09%
Totals	233,554	55.52%	172,301	40.96%	14,827	3.53%

Counties that flipped from Democratic to Republican

- Kent (largest city: Dover)
