= 2016 Delaware Senate election =

- November 8, 2016

11 of the 21 seats in the Delaware Senate 11 seats needed for a majority
- Turnout: 65.35%

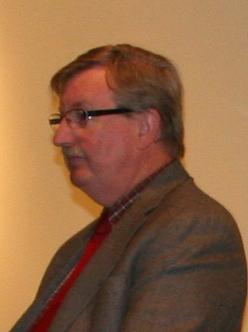
	Majority party	Minority party
Leader	Patti Blevins (lost re-election)	Gary Simpson
Party	Democratic	Republican
Leader since	January 8, 2013	January 8, 2009
Leader's seat	7th - Elsmere	18th - Milford
Last election	12	9
Seats before	12	9
Seats won	6	5
Seats after	11	10
Seat change	▼1	▲1
Popular vote	106,963	97,082
Percentage	52.30%	47.47%
- Results: Republican gain Democratic hold Republican hold No election
President pro tempore before election
Patti Blevins
Democratic
Elected President pro tempore
David McBride
Democratic

The 2016 Delaware Senate election was held on November 8, 2016 to elect 11 of the 21 members to Delaware's Senate. The election coincided with the elections for other offices, including the Presidency, U.S. House of Representatives, and state house. The primary election was held on September 13, 2016.

Delaware Republicans needed to have a net gain of two seats to flip the chamber from the Democrats. However, they gained only one seat (winning 10 seats compared to 11 seats for the Democrats).

== Results summary ==
District	Incumbent	Party	Elected Senator	Party
1	Harris McDowell III	Dem	Harris McDowell III	Dem
5	Catherine Cloutier	Rep	Catherine Cloutier	Rep
7	Patti Blevins	Dem	Anthony Delcollo	Rep
8	David Sokola	Dem	David Sokola	Dem
9	Karen Peterson	Dem	Jack Walsh	Dem
12	Nicole Poore	Dem	Nicole Poore	Dem
13	David McBride	Dem	David McBride	Dem
14	Bruce Ennis	Dem	Bruce Ennis	Dem
15	David Lawson	Rep	David Lawson	Rep
19	Brian Pettyjohn	Rep	Brian Pettyjohn	Rep
20	Gerald Hocker	Rep	Gerald Hocker	Rep

Party	Candi- dates	Votes		Seats		
Party	Candi- dates	No.	%	No.	+/–	%
Democratic	9	106,963	52.30%	11	▼1	52.38%
Republican	8	97,082	47.47%	10	▲1	47.62%
Green	1	462	0.23%	0	Steady	0.00%
Total	18	204,507	100%	21	Steady	100%

Popular vote
Democratic	52.30%
Republican	47.47%
Green	0.23%

Senate seats
Democratic	52.38%
Republican	47.62%

== Predictions ==
Source	Ranking	As of
Governing	Safe D	October 12, 2016

== Detailed results ==
=== District 1 ===
Incumbent Democrat Harris McDowell III had represented the 1st district since 1977.

Delaware Senate 1st district Democratic primary election, 2016
Party	Candidate	Votes	%
Democratic	Harris McDowell III (incumbent)	3,876	70.84%
Democratic	Joseph D. McCole	1,596	29.16%
Total votes		5,472	100%

Delaware Senate 1st district general election, 2016
Party	Candidate	Votes	%
Democratic	Harris McDowell III (incumbent)	11,858	56.32%
Republican	James Spadola	9,195	43.68%
Total votes		21,053	100%
Democratic hold			

=== District 5 ===
Incumbent Republican Catherine Cloutier had represented the 5th district since 2001.

Delaware Senate 5th district general election, 2016
Party	Candidate	Votes	%
Republican	Catherine Cloutier (incumbent)	14,083	59.48%
Democratic	Denise Bowers	9,596	40.52%
Total votes		23,679	100%
Republican hold			

=== District 7 ===
Incumbent Democrat President pro tempore Patti Blevins had represented the 7th district since 1991. She lost re-election to Republican Anthony Delcollo.

Delaware Senate 7th district general election, 2016
Party	Candidate	Votes	%
Republican	Anthony Delcollo	9,604	50.55%
Democratic	Patti Blevins (incumbent)	9,398	49.45%
Total votes		19,002	100%
Republican gain from Democratic			

=== District 8 ===
Incumbent Democrat David Sokola had represented the 8th district since 1991.

Delaware Senate 8th district general election, 2016
Party	Candidate	Votes	%
Democratic	David Sokola (incumbent)	8,862	50.81%
Republican	Meredith Chapman	8,115	46.53%
Green	David B. Chandler	462	2.66%
Total votes		17,439	100%
Democratic hold			

=== District 9 ===
Incumbent Democrat Karen Peterson had represented the 9th district since 2003. Peterson retired and fellow Democrat Jack Walsh won the open seat.

Delaware Senate 9th district Democratic primary election, 2016
Party	Candidate	Votes	%
Democratic	Jack Walsh	1,364	57.17%
Democratic	Caitlin M. Olsen	1,022	42.83%
Total votes		2,386	100%

Delaware Senate 9th district general election, 2016
Party	Candidate	Votes	%
Democratic	Jack Walsh	13,500	100%
Total votes		13,500	100%
Democratic hold			

=== District 12 ===
Incumbent Democrat Nicole Poore had represented the 12th district since 2013.

Delaware Senate 12th district general election, 2016
Party	Candidate	Votes	%
Democratic	Nicole Poore (incumbent)	18,961	100%
Total votes		18,961	100%
Democratic hold			

=== District 13 ===
Incumbent Democrat Majority Leader David McBride had represented the 13th district since 1979.

Delaware Senate 13th district general election, 2016
Party	Candidate	Votes	%
Democratic	David McBride (incumbent)	14,503	100%
Total votes		14,503	100%
Democratic hold			

=== District 14 ===
Incumbent Democrat Bruce Ennis had represented the 14th district since 2007.

Delaware Senate 14th district general election, 2016
Party	Candidate	Votes	%
Democratic	Bruce Ennis (incumbent)	13,454	59.55%
Republican	Carl Pace	9,138	40.45%
Total votes		22,592	100%
Democratic hold			

=== District 15 ===
Incumbent Republican David Lawson had represented the 15th district since 2011.

Delaware Senate 15th district general election, 2016
Party	Candidate	Votes	%
Republican	David Lawson (incumbent)	15,036	100%
Total votes		15,036	100%
Republican hold			

=== District 19 ===
Incumbent Republican Brian Pettyjohn had represented the 19th district since 2013.

Delaware Senate 19th district general election, 2016
Party	Candidate	Votes	%
Republican	Brian Pettyjohn (incumbent)	14,003	100%
Total votes		14,003	100%
Republican hold			

=== District 20 ===
Incumbent Republican Gerald Hocker had represented the 20th district since 2013.

Delaware Senate 20th district general election, 2016
Party	Candidate	Votes	%
Republican	Gerald Hocker (incumbent)	17,908	72.39%
Democratic	Perry J. Mitchell	6,831	27.61%
Total votes		24,739	100%
Republican hold			
