= 2002 Delaware Senate election =

- November 5, 2002

All 21 seats in the Delaware Senate 11 seats needed for a majority
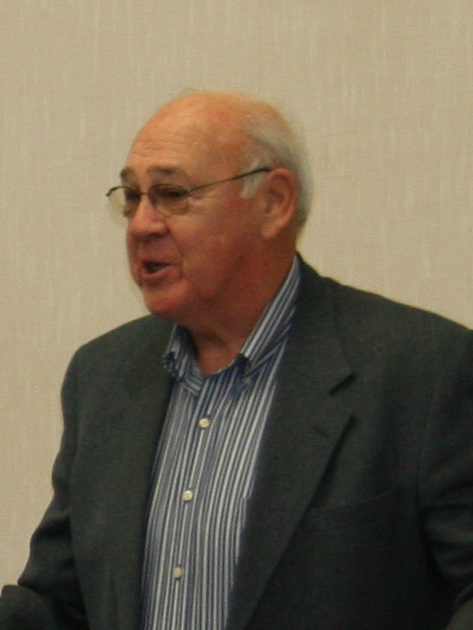

	Majority party	Minority party
Leader	Thomas Sharp (retired)	Steven Amick
Party	Democratic	Republican
Leader's seat	9th - Wilmington	10th - Newark
Last election	13	8
Seats before	13	8
Seats won	4	6
Seats after	13	8
Seat change	Steady	Steady
Popular vote	71,101	77,609
Percentage	47.74%	52.11%
- Results: Democratic hold Republican hold
President pro tempore before election
Thomas Sharp
Democratic
Elected President pro tempore
Thurman Adams Jr.
Democratic

The 2002 Delaware Senate election was held on November 5, 2002, to elect all 21 of the 21 members to Delaware's Senate. The election coincided with elections for other offices, including for U.S. Senate, U.S. House of Representatives, and state house. The primary election was held on September 7, 2002.

== Predictions ==
Source	Ranking	As of
The Cook; Political Report	Likely D	October 4, 2002

== Results summary ==
District	Incumbent	Party	Elected Senator	Party
1	Harris McDowell III	Dem	Harris McDowell III	Dem
2	Margaret Rose Henry	Dem	Margaret Rose Henry	Dem
3	Robert Marshall	Dem	Robert Marshall	Dem
4	Dallas Winslow	Rep	Charlie Copeland	Rep
5	Catherine Cloutier	Rep	Catherine Cloutier	Rep
6	Liane Sorenson	Rep	Liane Sorenson	Rep
7	Patti Blevins	Dem	Patti Blevins	Dem
8	David Sokola	Dem	David Sokola	Dem
9	Thomas Sharp	Dem	Karen Peterson	Dem
10	Steven Amick	Rep	Steven Amick	Rep
11	Tony DeLuca	Dem	Tony DeLuca	Dem
12	Dorinda Connor	Rep	Dorinda Connor	Rep
13	David McBride	Dem	David McBride	Dem
14	James Vaughn	Dem	James Vaughn	Dem
15	Nancy W. Cook	Dem	Nancy W. Cook	Dem
16	Colin Bonini	Rep	Colin Bonini	Rep
17	John Still III	Rep	John Still III	Rep
18	Gary Simpson	Rep	Gary Simpson	Rep
19	Thurman Adams Jr.	Dem	Thurman Adams Jr.	Dem
20	George Bunting	Dem	George Bunting	Dem
21	Robert Venables Sr.	Dem	Robert Venables Sr.	Dem

Party	Candi- dates	Votes		Seats		
Party	Candi- dates	No.	%	No.	+/–	%
Democratic	8	71,101	47.74%	16	Steady	61.90%
Republican	7	77,609	52.11%	5	Steady	38.10%
Independent	1	214	0.14%	0	Steady	0.00%
Total	16	148,924	100%	21	Steady	100%

Popular vote
Republican	52.11%
Democratic	47.74%
Independent	0.14%

Senate seats
Democratic	61.90%
Republican	38.10%

== Detailed results ==
=== District 1 ===
Incumbent Democrat Harris McDowell III has represented the 1st district since 1977. Democratic primary

Delaware Senate 1st district Democratic primary election, 2002
Party	Candidate	Votes	%
Democratic	Harris McDowell III (incumbent)	1,388	63.70%
Democratic	Thornton Carroll	791	36.30%
Total votes		2,179	100%

General election

Delaware Senate 1st district general election, 2002
Party	Candidate	Votes	%
Democratic	Harris McDowell III (incumbent)	7,646	64.12%
Republican	Lee Murphy	4,279	35.88%
Total votes		11,925	100%
Democratic hold			

=== District 2 ===
Incumbent Democrat Margaret Rose Henry has represented the 2nd district since 1994. Democratic primary

Delaware Senate 2nd district Democratic primary election, 2002
Party	Candidate	Votes	%
Democratic	Margaret Rose Henry (incumbent)	1,908	71.68%
Democratic	Samuel Guy	754	28.32%
Total votes		2,662	100%

General election

Delaware Senate 2nd district general election, 2002
Party	Candidate	Votes	%
Democratic	Margaret Rose Henry (incumbent)	5,908	100%
Total votes		5,908	100%
Democratic hold			

=== District 3 ===
Incumbent Democrat Robert Marshall has represented the 3rd district since 1979. Democratic primary

Delaware Senate 3rd district Democratic primary election, 2002
Party	Candidate	Votes	%
Democratic	Robert Marshall (incumbent)	1,359	76.01%
Democratic	Paul Falkowski	429	23.99%
Total votes		1,788	100%

General election

Delaware Senate 3rd district general election, 2002
Party	Candidate	Votes	%
Democratic	Robert Marshall (incumbent)	4,548	74.98%
Republican	Michael Brown Sr.	1,518	25.02%
Total votes		6,066	100%
Democratic hold			

=== District 4 ===
Incumbent Republican Dallas Winslow has represented the 4th district since 1999. Winslow lost re-nomination to fellow Republican Charlie Copeland, who went on to win the general election. Republican primary

Delaware Senate 4th district Republican primary election, 2002
Party	Candidate	Votes	%
Republican	Charlie Copeland	2,151	62.77%
Republican	Dallas Winslow (incumbent)	1,276	37.23%
Total votes		3,427	100%

General election

Delaware Senate 4th district general election, 2002
Party	Candidate	Votes	%
Republican	Charlie Copeland	11,592	72.35%
Democratic	Fred Boykin	4,431	27.65%
Total votes		16,023	100%
Republican hold			

=== District 5 ===
Incumbent Republican Catherine Cloutier has represented the 5th district since 2001.

Delaware Senate 5th district general election, 2002
Party	Candidate	Votes	%
Republican	Catherine Cloutier (incumbent)	9,446	100%
Total votes		9,446	100%
Republican hold			

=== District 6 ===
Incumbent Republican Liane Sorenson has represented the 6th district since 1995.

Delaware Senate 6th district general election, 2002
Party	Candidate	Votes	%
Republican	Liane Sorenson (incumbent)	5,611	54.95%
Democratic	Richard DiLiberto Jr.	4,600	45.05%
Total votes		10,211	100%
Republican hold			

=== District 7 ===
Incumbent Democrat Patti Blevins has represented the 7th district since 1991.

Delaware Senate 7th district general election, 2002
Party	Candidate	Votes	%
Democratic	Patti Blevins (incumbent)	8,443	100%
Total votes		8,443	100%
Democratic hold			

=== District 8 ===
Incumbent Democrat David Sokola has represented the 8th district since 1991.

Delaware Senate 8th district general election, 2002
Party	Candidate	Votes	%
Democratic	David Sokola (incumbent)	6,411	51.10%
Republican	Michael Ramone	6,134	48.90%
Total votes		12,545	100%
Democratic hold			

=== District 9 ===
Incumbent Democrat and President pro tempore Thomas Sharp has represented the 9th district since 1975. Sharp didn't seek re-election and fellow Democrat Karen Peterson won the open seat. Democratic primary

Delaware Senate 9th district Democratic primary election, 2002
Party	Candidate	Votes	%
Democratic	Karen Peterson	638	56.16%
Democratic	Timothy Sheldon	498	43.84%
Total votes		1,136	100%

Republican primary

Delaware Senate 9th district Republican primary election, 2002
Party	Candidate	Votes	%
Republican	Kevin Wilkes	389	50.26%
Republican	Donald Mulrine Jr.	385	49.74%
Total votes		774	100%

General election

Delaware Senate 9th district general election, 2002
Party	Candidate	Votes	%
Democratic	Karen Peterson	5,783	58.41%
Republican	Kevin Wilkes	4,118	41.59%
Total votes		9,901	100%
Democratic hold			

=== District 10 ===
Incumbent Republican and Minority Leader Steven Amick has represented the 10th district since 1995.

Delaware Senate 10th district general election, 2002
Party	Candidate	Votes	%
Republican	Steven Amick (incumbent)	6,436	59.43%
Democratic	Julia Dugan	4,393	40.57%
Total votes		10,829	100%
Republican hold			

=== District 11 ===
Incumbent Democrat Tony DeLuca has represented the 11th district since 1999.

Delaware Senate 11th district general election, 2002
Party	Candidate	Votes	%
Democratic	Tony DeLuca (incumbent)	6,253	100%
Total votes		6,253	100%
Democratic hold			

=== District 12 ===
Incumbent Republican Dorinda Connor has represented the 12th district since 1997.

Delaware Senate 12th district general election, 2002
Party	Candidate	Votes	%
Republican	Dorinda Connor (incumbent)	7,875	100%
Total votes		7,875	100%
Republican hold			

=== District 13 ===
Incumbent Democrat David McBride has represented the 13th district since 1979.

Delaware Senate 13th district general election, 2002
Party	Candidate	Votes	%
Democratic	David McBride (incumbent)	6,337	100%
Total votes		6,337	100%
Democratic hold			

=== District 14 ===
Incumbent Democrat James Vaughn has represented the 14th district since 1980.

Delaware Senate 14th district general election, 2002
Party	Candidate	Votes	%
Democratic	James Vaughn (incumbent)	6,611	59.05%
Republican	Mark Schaeffer	4,415	39.43%
Libertarian	Anita Cooper	170	1.52%
Total votes		11,196	100%
Democratic hold			

=== District 15 ===
Incumbent Democrat Nancy Cook has represented the 15th district since 1975.

Delaware Senate 15th district general election, 2002
Party	Candidate	Votes	%
Democratic	Nancy Cook (incumbent)	6,862	100%
Total votes		6,862	100%
Democratic hold			

=== District 16 ===
Incumbent Republican Colin Bonini has represented the 16th district since 1995. Democratic primary

Delaware Senate 16th district Democratic primary election, 2002
Party	Candidate	Votes	%
Democratic	Paul Davis	487	52.54%
Democratic	James Testerman	440	47.46%
Total votes		927	100%

General election

Delaware Senate 16th district general election, 2002
Party	Candidate	Votes	%
Republican	Colin Bonini (incumbent)	7,324	66.52%
Democratic	Paul Davis	3,686	33.48%
Total votes		11,010	100%
Republican hold			

=== District 17 ===
Incumbent Republican John Still III has represented the 17th district since 1988.

Delaware Senate 17th district general election, 2002
Party	Candidate	Votes	%
Republican	John Still III (incumbent)	7,608	100%
Total votes		7,608	100%
Republican hold			

=== District 18 ===
Incumbent Republican Gary Simpson has represented the 18th district since 1999.

Delaware Senate 18th district general election, 2002
Party	Candidate	Votes	%
Republican	Gary Simpson (incumbent)	8,875	57.37%
Democratic	John Burton Sr.	6,594	42.63%
Total votes		15,469	100%
Republican hold			

=== District 19 ===
Incumbent Democrat Thurman Adams Jr. has represented the 19th district since 1973. Republican primary

Delaware Senate 19th district Republican primary election, 2002
Party	Candidate	Votes	%
Republican	Stell Selby	469	53.30%
Republican	Matthew Opaliski	411	46.70%
Total votes		880	100%

General election

Delaware Senate 19th district general election, 2002
Party	Candidate	Votes	%
Democratic	Thurman Adams Jr. (incumbent)	6,397	63.64%
Republican	Stell Selby	3,655	36.36%
Total votes		10,052	100%
Democratic hold			

=== District 20 ===
Incumbent Democrat George Bunting has represented the 20th district since 1997.

Delaware Senate 20th district general election, 2002
Party	Candidate	Votes	%
Democratic	George Bunting (incumbent)	9,046	59.45%
Republican	John Rieley	5,817	38.23%
Independent Party	Albert Gargano Jr.	207	1.36%
Green	William Winkler Sr.	146	0.96%
Total votes		15,216	100%
Democratic hold			

=== District 21 ===
Incumbent Democrat Robert Venables Sr. has represented the 21st district since 1989.

Delaware Senate 21st district general election, 2002
Party	Candidate	Votes	%
Democratic	Robert Venables Sr. (incumbent)	7,756	100%
Total votes		7,756	100%
Democratic hold			
