= 2004 Delaware Senate election =

- November 2, 2004

10 of the 21 seats in the Delaware Senate 11 seats needed for a majority

	Majority party	Minority party
Leader	Thurman Adams Jr.	John Still III
Party	Democratic	Republican
Leader since	January 2003	January 2003
Leader's seat	19th - Bridgeville	17th - Dover
Last election	13	8
Seats before	13	8
Seats won	4	6
Seats after	13	8
Seat change	Steady	Steady
Popular vote	71,101	77,609
Percentage	47.74%	52.11%
- Results: Democratic hold Republican hold No election
President pro tempore before election
Thurman Adams Jr.
Democratic
Elected President pro tempore
Thurman Adams Jr.
Democratic

The 2004 Delaware Senate election was held on November 2, 2004, to elect 10 of the 21 members to Delaware's Senate. The election coincided with elections for other offices, including for U.S. President, U.S. House of Representatives, Governor, Lieutenant Governor, and state house. The primary election was held on September 11, 2004.

== Predictions ==
Source	Ranking	As of
Rothenberg	Safe D	October 1, 2004

== Results summary ==
District	Incumbent	Party	Elected Senator	Party
2	Margaret Rose Henry	Dem	Margaret Rose Henry	Dem
3	Robert Marshall	Dem	Robert Marshall	Dem
4	Charlie Copeland	Rep	Charlie Copeland	Rep
6	Liane Sorenson	Rep	Liane Sorenson	Rep
10	Steven Amick	Rep	Steven Amick	Rep
11	Tony DeLuca	Dem	Tony DeLuca	Dem
16	Colin Bonini	Rep	Colin Bonini	Rep
17	John Still III	Rep	John Still III	Rep
18	Gary Simpson	Rep	Gary Simpson	Rep
21	Robert Venables Sr.	Dem	Robert Venables Sr.	Dem

Party	Candi- dates	Votes		Seats		
Party	Candi- dates	No.	%	No.	+/–	%
Democratic	8	71,101	47.74%	16	Steady	61.90%
Republican	7	77,609	52.11%	5	Steady	38.10%
Independent	1	214	0.14%	0	Steady	0.00%
Total	16	148,924	100%	21	Steady	100%

Popular vote
Republican	52.11%
Democratic	47.74%
Independent	0.14%

Senate seats
Democratic	61.90%
Republican	38.10%

== Detailed results ==
=== District 2 ===
Incumbent Democratic Majority Leader Margaret Rose Henry has represented the 2nd district since 1994.

Delaware Senate 2nd district general election, 2004
Party	Candidate	Votes	%
Democratic	Margaret Rose Henry (incumbent)	10,398	100%
Total votes		10,398	100%
Democratic hold			

=== District 3 ===
Incumbent Democrat Robert Marshall has represented the 3rd district since 1979.

Delaware Senate 3rd district general election, 2004
Party	Candidate	Votes	%
Democratic	Robert Marshall (incumbent)	9,343	100%
Total votes		9,343	100%
Democratic hold			

=== District 4 ===
Incumbent Republican Charlie Copeland has represented the 4th district since 2003.

Delaware Senate 4th district general election, 2004
Party	Candidate	Votes	%
Republican	Charlie Copeland (incumbent)	16,289	100%
Total votes		16,289	100%
Republican hold			

=== District 6 ===
Incumbent Republican Liane Sorenson has represented the 6th district since 1995.

Delaware Senate 6th district general election, 2004
Party	Candidate	Votes	%
Republican	Liane Sorenson (incumbent)	9,972	100%
Total votes		9,972	100%
Republican hold			

=== District 10 ===
Incumbent Republican Steven Amick has represented the 10th district since 1995.

Delaware Senate 10th district general election, 2004
Party	Candidate	Votes	%
Republican	Steven Amick (incumbent)	10,775	55.11%
Democratic	Julia Dugan	8,777	44.89%
Total votes		19,552	100%
Republican hold			

=== District 11 ===
Incumbent Democrat Tony DeLuca has represented the 11th district since 1999.

Delaware Senate 11th district general election, 2004
Party	Candidate	Votes	%
Democratic	Tony DeLuca (incumbent)	12,010	100%
Total votes		12,010	100%
Democratic hold			

=== District 16 ===
Incumbent Republican Colin Bonini has represented the 16th district since 1995.

Delaware Senate 16th district general election, 2004
Party	Candidate	Votes	%
Republican	Colin Bonini (incumbent)	11,570	69.28%
Democratic	James Testerman	5,131	30.72%
Total votes		16,701	100%
Republican hold			

=== District 17 ===
Incumbent Republican Minority Leader John Still III has represented the 17th district since 1988.

Delaware Senate 17th district general election, 2004
Party	Candidate	Votes	%
Republican	John Still III (incumbent)	8,290	51.01%
Democratic	Brian Bushweller	7,749	47.68%
Independent Party	Karen Hartley-Nagle	214	1.32%
Total votes		16,253	100%
Republican hold			

=== District 18 ===
Incumbent Republican Gary Simpson has represented the 18th district since 1999.

Delaware Senate 18th district general election, 2004
Party	Candidate	Votes	%
Republican	Gary Simpson (incumbent)	14,392	63.29%
Democratic	F. Thomas Savage	8,349	36.71%
Total votes		22,741	100%
Republican hold			

=== District 21 ===
Incumbent Democrat Robert Venables Sr. has represented the 21st district since 1989.

Delaware Senate 21st district general election, 2004
Party	Candidate	Votes	%
Democratic	Robert Venables Sr. (incumbent)	9,344	59.65%
Republican	Daniel Short	6,321	40.35%
Total votes		15,665	100%
Democratic hold			
