= Stephen Smyk =

American politician

Member of the Delaware House of Representatives from the 20th district
- In office November 7, 2012 – November 9, 2022
- Preceded by: Nick Manolakos
- Succeeded by: Stell Parker Selby

Personal details
- Party: Republican
- Website: repstevesmyk.com

Stephen T. Smyk is an American politician who served in the Delaware House of Representatives representing the 20th district from 2012 to 2022.

In 2022, Smyk ran for the Delaware Senate for the 6th district after incumbent Republican Ernesto Lopez decided not to run. Smyk lost in the general election to Democrat Russ Huxtable, gaining 47.5% of the vote. He was replaced in the Delaware House of Representatives by Democrat Stell Parker Selby.

== Electoral history ==
- In 2012, Smyk won the general election with 6,469 votes (53.2%) against Democratic nominee M. Marie Mayor.
- In 2014, Smyk won the general election with 5,473 votes (58.1%) against Democratic nominee Marie Mayor and Independent nominee Don Ayotte.
- In 2016, Smyk won the general election with 9,209 votes (61.6%) against Democratic nominee Barbara W. Vaughan and Independent nominee Don Ayotte.
- In 2018, Smyk won the general election with 8,187 votes (56.1%) against Democratic nominee John D. Bucchioni and Libertarian nominee Harry R. Smouse Jr.
