= Charles Potter Jr. =

American politician

Member of the Delaware House of Representatives from the 1st district
- In office January 8, 2013 – January 8, 2019
- Preceded by: Dennis P. Williams
- Succeeded by: Nnamdi Chukwuocha

Personal details
- Born: Wilmington, Delaware, U.S.
- Party: Democratic
- Spouse: Velda Jones-Potter
- Education: Delaware Technical Community College; Wilmington College

Charles Potter Jr. is an American politician. He was a Democratic member of the Delaware House of Representatives from 2013 to 2019. He was defeated by Nnamdi Chukwuocha in the 2018 Democratic primary.

== Early life and education ==
Potter was born in Wilmington, Delaware. He attended Delaware Technical Community College and graduated from Wilmington College.

== Legal controversies ==
In 2017, Potter and his wife, Velda Jones-Potter, were at risk of losing their home to a sheriff's sale as a result of "ongoing litigation stemming from home repairs." A Delaware Superior Court judge rejected all of the couple's complaints after finding them liable for failing to pay a construction contractor over $60,000 and criticized their "kitchen sink" tactics in the litigation. The Delaware Supreme Court rejected two appeals by the couple, and upheld a judgement of $116,000, plus interest, against them in 2018.

In 2018, the Delaware Superior Court rejected an attempt by the Potters to force the City of Wilmington's Licenses and Inspections Department to hold the contractor liable for code violations. The judge ruled that the couple cannot use the city to obtain compensation for losing their earlier legal disputes and criticized their use of the courts as spiteful. The Potters' appeal to the Delaware Supreme Court was rejected in 2019.

Shortly before losing his bid for reelection in the Democratic primary, Potter used his position on the floor of the Delaware House of Representatives to criticize the Superior Court judges who had ruled against him.

== Electoral history ==
- In 2006, Potter challenged incumbent Democrat Harris McDowell III for the Senate District 1 seat in a four-way primary election. He lost, coming in second with 31.6% of the vote.
- In 2012, Potter won the three-way Democratic primary with 2,546 votes (63.9%) to replace Dennis P. Williams, who was running for mayor of Wilmington. He was elected unopposed in the general election with 9,321 votes.
- In 2014, Potter was unopposed in the general election, winning 4,691 votes.
- In 2016, Potter was unopposed in the general election, winning 8,901 votes.
- In 2018, Potter lost the Democratic primary to Nnamdi Chukwuocha, who won 2,306 votes (59.6%) against Potter.
