= Teresa Schooley =

American politician

Member of the Delaware House of Representatives from the 23rd district
- In office November 3, 2004 – November 7, 2012
- Preceded by: Timothy Boulden
- Succeeded by: Paul Baumbach

Personal details
- Party: Democratic
- Education: Gettysburg College

Teresa Schooley was an American politician who served in the Delaware House of Representatives for the 23rd district from 2004-2012. She was also the director of Kids Count in Delaware, an organization that tracks data indicators on the health and well-being of children and families in the state, 1996-2011.
