= Andria Bennett =

American politician

Member of the Delaware House of Representatives from the 32nd district
- In office January 8, 2013 – November 9, 2022
- Preceded by: Brad Bennett
- Succeeded by: Kerri Evelyn Harris

Personal details
- Party: Democratic
- Spouse: Brad Bennett
- Parent: John Viola
- Profession: Politician

Andria L. Bennett is an American politician. She was a Democratic member of the Delaware House of Representatives, representing District 32. She was elected in 2012 to replace her husband, Brad Bennett, who had decided not to seek reelection after a second arrest for drunk driving. Bennett was formerly an adjunct faculty member at Delaware Technical Community College.

== Electoral history ==
- In 2012, Andria Bennett won the Democratic primary with 421 votes (61.6%), and went on to win the general election with 4,097 votes (63.3%) against Republican nominee Ellis Parrott.
- In 2014, Bennett won the general election with 1,860 votes (57.6%) against Republican nominee William McVay.
- In 2016, Bennett won the general election with 4,241 votes (60.5%) against Republican nominee Patricia McDaniel Foltz.
- In 2018, Bennett won the general election with 3,510 votes (62.3%) against Republican nominee Cheryl Precourt.

== Domestic abuse arrest and retirement ==
According to Delaware State Police, Bennett was arrested on December 13, 2020, on charges of third-degree assault after a domestic dispute. She was arraigned and released on her own recognizance and the Delaware Department of Justice confirmed that charges against Bennett were dropped in February 2021, at the victim's request. After the arrest, she decided to not run for re-election in 2022.
