= Harvey Kenton =

American politician

Harvey R. Kenton
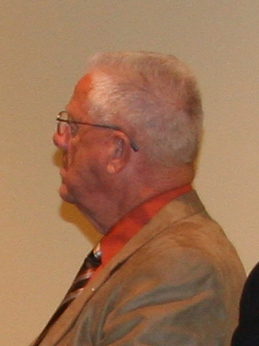

Member of the Delaware House of Representatives from the 36th district
- In office November 3, 2010 – November 7, 2018
- Preceded by: V. George Carey
- Succeeded by: Bryan Shupe

Personal details
- Born: 1940 or 1941 (age 85–86) Milford, Delaware
- Party: Republican
- Education: Delaware Technical Community College (AAS)

Harvey R. Kenton (born 1940/1941) is an American politician. He was a Republican member of the Delaware House of Representatives from 2011 to 2019, representing District 36.

== Career and education ==
After graduating from high school, Kenton enlisted in the United States Navy. He worked in agriculture for decades before being elected to the Delaware House of Representatives in 2010.

In June 2021, at the age of 80, Kenton earned an associate degree in applied science for production agriculture from Delaware Technical Community College, also winning the Outstanding Graduate Award.

== Electoral history ==
- In 2010, Kenton won the general election with 5,229 votes (54.3%) against Democratic nominee C. Russell McCabe to replace retiring Republican V. George Carey.
- In 2012, Kenton was unopposed in the general election, winning 6,298 votes.
- In 2014, Kenton was unopposed in the general election, winning 4,455 votes.
- In 2016, Kenton was unopposed in the general election, winning 7,175 votes.
