= Pamela Thornburg =

American politician

Member of Delaware House of Representatives for the 29th district
- In office 2001–2010
- Preceded by: Charles Welch III
- Succeeded by: Lincoln Willis

Personal details
- Party: Republican

Pamela J. Thornburg is an American politician. She was a member of the Delaware House of Representatives from 2000 to 2010.

In the 2008 Delaware House of Representatives election, she was re-elected by just 50 votes.
