= Hazel Plant =

American politician (1934–2010)

Member of the Delaware House of Representatives from the 2nd district
- In office November 6, 2002 – November 3, 2010
- Preceded by: Arthur Scott
- Succeeded by: Stephanie Bolden

Personal details
- Born: January 1, 1934
- Died: November 24, 2010 (aged 76)
- Party: Democratic
- Spouse: Al Plant Sr.

Hazel D. Plant (January 1, 1934 – November 24, 2010) was an American politician who served in the Delaware House of Representatives for the 2nd district. She was elected in 2002 after her husband, Al Plant Sr., died while in office. Plant served in the legislature until 2010, when she was defeated in the September primary by Stephanie Bolden.

Plant died on November 24, 2010, at the age of 76. The following year, the Women’s Work Release Treatment Center in New Castle was renamed in her honor.
