= Bryon Short =

American politician

Member of the Delaware House of Representatives from the 7th district
- In office November 8, 2006 – November 7, 2018
- Preceded by: Wayne Smith
- Succeeded by: Ray Seigfried

Personal details
- Born: March 7, 1966 (age 60)
- Party: Democratic
- Education: Salisbury University

Bryon H. Short (born March 7, 1966) is an American politician. He was a Democratic member of the Delaware House of Representatives from 2006 to 2018. Short earned a BA in psychology from Salisbury University.

== Electoral history ==
- 2007 When Republican Representative Wayne Smith resigned and left the District 7 seat open, Short won the April 2007 Special election.
- 2008 Short won the September 9, 2008 Democratic Primary and won the November 4, 2008 General election with 6,281 votes (58.6%) against Republican nominee James Bowers.
- 2010 Short was unopposed for the September 17, 2010 Democratic Primary and won the three-way November 2, 2010 General election with 4,983 votes (56.9%) against Republican nominee Judith Travis and Scott Gesty (who had qualified and received votes as both the Independent Party of Delaware and Libertarian candidate).
- 2012 Short was unopposed for the September 11, 2012 Democratic Primary and won the three-way November 6, 2012 General election with 7,280 votes (68.2%) against Republican nominee Daniel Lepre and Libertarian candidate C. Robert Wilson.
