= Helene Keeley =

American politician (born 1965)

Speaker pro tempore of the Delaware House of Representatives
- In office January 2015 – November 12, 2018
- Preceded by: Gerald Brady
- Succeeded by: Position abolished

Member of the Delaware House of Representatives from the 3rd district
- In office November 6, 2002 – November 12, 2018
- Preceded by: Arthur Scott
- Succeeded by: Sherry Dorsey Walker

Member of the Delaware House of Representatives from the 5th district
- In office November 6, 1996 – November 6, 2002
- Preceded by: Casimir Jonkiert
- Succeeded by: Melanie George Smith

Personal details
- Born: May 15, 1965 (age 61) Wilmington, Delaware, U.S.
- Party: Democratic
- Education: Columbia University (BA)

Helene M. Keeley (born May 15, 1965) is an American politician. She was a Democratic member of the Delaware House of Representatives from 1997 to 2019. Initially planning to run for reelection in 2018, she retired to accept a position as deputy director at the Delaware Lottery Office with an annual salary of $95,000. She had previously been appointed a community relations community for the Department of Labor in 2004 with an annual salary of $46,344 in addition to her salary as a legislator, and was one of several former Democrats to receive a high-paying state job after leaving legislative office.

== Electoral history ==
- In 1996, Keeley challenged incumbent Democrat Casimir Jonkiert in a three-way primary election for the House District 5 seat, winning by 32 votes with 860 votes total (41.1%) against Jonkiert and Hollis Gaines. She went on to win the general election with 3,326 votes (78.0%) against Republican nominee Michael Brown.
- In 1998, Keeley won the general election with 2,036 votes (79.6%) against Republican nominee Paul Falkowski.
- In 2000, Keeley won a three-way Democratic primary with 1,189 votes (64.8%) against Linda Cannon and Paul Falkowski, who had switched his registration to the Democratic Party. She was unopposed in the general election, winning 4,311 votes.
- In 2002, Keeley was redistricted to District 3 and won the general election with 2,153 votes (73.7%) against Republican nominee Calvin Brown.
- In 2004, Keeley won the Democratic primary with 1,042 votes (73.0%) in a rematch against Linda Cannon, and was unopposed in the general election, winning 4,825 votes.
- In 2006, Keeley won the Democratic primary with 600 votes (59.2%) against Robert Bovell, and was unopposed in the general election, winning 2,828 votes.
- In 2008, Keeley was unopposed for both the primary and general election, winning 5,419 votes in the general election.
- In 2010, Keeley won the Democratic primary with 736 votes (55.5%) in a rematch against Robert Bovell. She went on to win the general election with 3,375 votes (83.1%), also against Bovell, who was nominated as the Working Families Party candidate.
- In 2012, Keeley was unopposed for both the primary and general election, winning 6,341 votes in the general election.
- In 2014, Keeley won the general election with 2,477 (82.9%) in another rematch against Robert Bovell, who had switched his registration to the Republican Party.
- In 2016, Keeley was unopposed for both the primary and general election, winning 6,060 votes in the general election.

Delaware House of Representatives
Preceded by Gerald Brady	Speaker pro tempore of the Delaware House of Representatives; 2015–2018	Position abolished
