= James Johnson (Delaware politician) =

American politician (born 1943)

James "J.J." Johnson

Member of the Delaware House of Representatives from the 16th district
- In office January 11, 2005 – January 8, 2019
- Preceded by: William I. Houghton
- Succeeded by: Franklin D. Cooke

Personal details
- Born: February 25, 1943 (age 83)
- Party: Democratic
- Education: Goldey–Beacom College

Military service
- Branch: United States Army
- Service years: 1961–1964

James "J.J." Johnson (born February 25, 1943) is an American politician. He was a Democratic member of the Delaware House of Representatives from 2005 to 2019.

Prior to running for office, Johnson was a union worker at the former Chrysler plant in Newark, Delaware. He also served as president of the United Auto Workers and a member of the Coalition of Black Trade Unionists. During his time in office, he was a "leader in criminal justice reform" and a champion of workers' rights, racial equality, and economic justice.

== Electoral history ==
- In 2004, Johnson ran for the District 16 seat left open by retiring Democrat William I. Houghton. He won the Democratic primary and went on to win the general election with 5,823 votes (81.5%) against Republican nominee James Stockwell.
- In 2006, Johnson was unopposed for the general election, winning 4,221 votes.
- In 2008, Johnson was unopposed for the general election, winning 7,078 votes.
- In 2010, Johnson was unopposed for the general election, winning 5,328 votes.
- In 2012, Johnson won the general election with 7,613 votes (96.5%) against Libertarian candidate John Machurek.
- In 2014, Johnson won the general election with 3,802 votes (82.5%) against Republican nominee Gregory Coverdale.
- In 2016, Johnson was unopposed for the general election, winning 7,536 votes.
