= William Outten =

American politician (1948–2020)

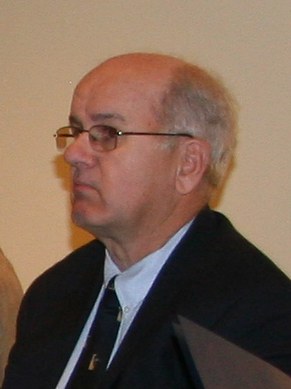

Member of the Delaware House of Representatives from the 30th district
- In office November 3, 2004 – November 7, 2018
- Preceded by: George Quillen
- Succeeded by: W. Shannon Morris

Personal details
- Born: William Robert Outten; October 1, 1948 Milford, Delaware, U.S.
- Died: March 17, 2020 (aged 71) Milford, Delaware, U.S.
- Party: Republican
- Education: Delaware Technical Community College

William Robert "Bobby" Outten (October 1, 1948 – March 17, 2020) was an American politician. He was a Republican member of the Delaware House of Representatives from 2005 to 2019, representing District 30. Outten earned an AA in business administration from Delaware Technical Community College. He died in 2020 at the age of 71.

== Electoral history ==
- In 2004, Outten won the general election with 4,644 votes (59.3%) against Democratic nominee Kimberly Robbins to replace retiring Republican George Quillen.
- In 2006, Outten won the general election with 3,521 votes (63.4%) against Democratic nominee Robert Price, who had run in 2004 but lost the primary election to Kimberly Robbins.
- In 2008, Outten was unopposed in the general election, winning 6,921 votes.
- In 2010, Outten was unopposed in the general election, winning 5,514 votes.
- In 2012, Outten won the general election with 5,906 votes (91.9%) against Libertarian nominee Gordon Smith.
- In 2014, Outten won the general election with 3,489 votes (65.7%) against Democratic nominee Jonathan Gallo and Libertarian nominee Gordon Smith.
- In 2016, Outten won the general election with 6,337 votes (70.7%) against Democratic nominee Charles Groce.
