= John Viola =

American politician (1950–2026)

Member of the Delaware House of Representatives from the 26th district
- In office November 4, 1998 – November 4, 2020
- Preceded by: Richard F. Davis
- Succeeded by: Madinah Wilson-Anton

Personal details
- Born: June 1, 1950
- Died: February 15, 2026 (aged 75)
- Party: Democratic
- Children: Andria Bennett
- Education: Goldey–Beacom College

John J. Viola (June 1, 1950 – February 15, 2026) was an American politician who served as a Democratic member of the Delaware House of Representatives for District 26. He was elected in 1998 after defeating incumbent Republican Richard F. Davis. He served as the majority whip in the House before he left the position and was replaced by John "Larry" Mitchell in 2019. His daughter, Andria Bennett, joined him in the House in 2012 after she was elected to replace her husband and Viola's son-in-law, Brad Bennett. In 2020, he was defeated by progressive primary challenger Madinah Wilson-Anton.

Viola earned an associate degree in business management from Goldey–Beacom College.

Viola died on February 15, 2026, at the age of 75.

== Electoral history ==
- In 1998, Viola challenged incumbent Republican Richard F. Davis and defeated him in the general election with 1,897 votes (51.3%).
- In 2000, Viola won the general election with 6,054 votes (74.0%) against Republican nominee John Megahan and Libertarian nominee Andrew Gregg.
- In 2002, Viola won the general election with 3,123 votes (95.9%) against Independent J. Oliver Lannak.
- In 2004, Viola was unopposed in the general election, winning 6,255 votes.
- In 2006, Viola won the Democratic primary with 381 votes (58.5%), and was unopposed in the general election, winning 3,795 votes.
- In 2008, Viola won the general election with 6,316 votes (79.9%) against Republican nominee Jeremy Filliben.
- In 2010, Viola won the general election with 4,819 votes (96.7%) against Republican nominee Hans-Erik Janco.
- In 2012, Viola was unopposed for the general election, winning 7,476 votes.
- In 2014, Viola was unopposed for the general election, winning 3,329 votes.
- In 2016, Viola was unopposed for the general election, winning 7,745 votes.
- In 2018, Viola won the general election with 5,417 votes (73.9%) against Republican nominee Justin Cruice.
- In 2020, Viola was defeated in the Democratic primary by challenger Madinah Wilson-Anton by a 42.7%-41.2% margin.
