= Joseph Miró =

Cuban American politician

Member of the Delaware House of Representatives from the 22nd district
- In office November 4, 1998 – November 7, 2018
- Preceded by: Joseph R. Petrilli
- Succeeded by: Michael F. Smith

Personal details
- Born: July 15, 1946 (age 80) Matanzas, Cuba
- Party: Republican
- Spouse: Joanne Miró
- Education: Lincoln University; University of Delaware; West Chester University
- Occupation: Teacher (retired)

Joseph E. Miró (born July 15, 1946) is a Cuban American politician. He was a Republican member of the Delaware House of Representatives from 1998 until his retirement in 2018. He served on the New Castle County Council from 1992 to 1998. He also served as president of the National Hispanic Caucus of State Legislators.

Miró was a teacher in the Christina School District from 1970 to 2001. He is a member of Holy Angels Church in Newark, Delaware.
