= Michael Mulrooney =

American politician (born 1955)

Member of the Delaware House of Representatives from the 17th district
- In office January 12, 1999 – January 8, 2019
- Preceded by: Jeffrey G. Mack
- Succeeded by: Melissa Minor-Brown

Personal details
- Born: December 31, 1955 (age 70)
- Party: Democratic

Michael P. Mulrooney (born December 31, 1955) is an American politician. He was a Democratic member of the Delaware House of Representatives from 1999 to 2019, representing District 17. He graduated from John Dickinson High School and apprenticed with the International Brotherhood of Electrical Workers.

== Electoral history ==
- In 1998, Mulrooney won the general election with 2,418 votes (53.5%) against Republican nominee Douglas Salter to replace retiring Republican Jeffrey G. Mack.
- In 2000, Mulrooney won the general election with 5,127 votes (74.0%) against Republican nominee Michael Shaw.
- In 2002, Mulrooney was unopposed in the general election, winning 4,340 votes.
- In 2004, Mulrooney won his only challenge in the Democratic primary with 1,198 votes (79.3%), and went on to win the general election with 6,590 votes (81.9%) against Republican nominee Phillip Simpkins.
- In 2006, Mulrooney won the general election with 4,619 votes (84.2%) against Republican nominee David Osborn.
- In 2008, Mulrooney won the general election with 6,981 votes (83.4%) in a rematch against Republican nominee David Osborn.
- In 2010, Mulrooney was unopposed in the general election, winning 5,108 votes.
- In 2012, Mulrooney won the general election with 7,297 votes (81.1%) against Republican nominee Laura Brown.
- In 2014, Mulrooney was unopposed in the general election, winning 3,860 votes.
- In 2016, Mulrooney was unopposed in the general election, winning 7,721 votes.
