= Deborah Hudson =

American politician (born 1952)

Member of the Delaware House of Representatives from the 12th district
- In office January 10, 1995 – January 6, 2019
- Preceded by: Liane Sorenson
- Succeeded by: Krista Griffith

Personal details
- Born: August 16, 1952 (age 74) Salisbury, Maryland
- Party: Republican
- Education: University of Delaware
- Website: repdeborahhudson.com

Deborah D. Hudson, formerly Deborah Hudson Capano, (born August 16, 1952) is an American politician. She was a Republican member of the Delaware House of Representatives from 1995 to 2019 representing District 12. She earned her BS in human resources from the University of Delaware.

== Electoral history ==
- In 1994, Hudson won the general election with 4,623 votes (64%) against Democratic nominee Christine Whitehead.
- In 1996, Hudson won the general election with 5,322 votes (58.9%) against Democratic nominee Brenda Smart.
- In 1998, Hudson was unopposed for the general election, winning 4,772 votes.
- In 2000, Hudson was unopposed for the general election, winning 7,301 votes.
- In 2002, Hudson was unopposed for the general election, winning 5,939 votes.
- In 2004, Hudson won the general election with 6,790 votes (65.2%) against Democratic nominee Harry Gravell.
- In 2006, Hudson beat Gravell in a rematch, winning the general election with 5,133 votes (64.7%).
- In 2008, Hudson was unopposed for the general election, winning 7,428 votes.
- In 2010, Hudson won the general election with 6,067 votes (88.8%) against Libertarian candidate James Christina.
- In 2012, Hudson was unopposed for the general election, winning 9,699 votes.
- In 2014, Hudson won the general election with 5,726 votes (65.3%) against Democratic nominee Jeffry Porter.
- In 2016, Hudson was unopposed for the general election, winning 9,866 votes.
- In 2018, Hudson defeated her first primary challenger by winning the Republican primary. She subsequently lost the general election to Krista Griffith in a major upset.

Delaware House of Representatives
| Preceded by Liane Sorenson | Member of the Delaware House of Representatives from the 12th district 1995-2019 | Succeeded by Krista Griffith |
