= Gerald Brady =

American politician (born 1956)

Member of the Delaware House of Representatives from the 4th district
- In office January 9, 2007 – February 2, 2022
- Preceded by: Joseph G. Di Pinto
- Succeeded by: Charles Freel

Personal details
- Born: July 9, 1956 (age 70)
- Party: Democratic
- Education: King's College
- Criminal information
- Conviction: Shoplifting (2 counts)
- Penalty: 2 months probation

Details
- Date apprehended: January 25, 2022

Gerald L. Brady (born July 9, 1956) is an American politician who served as a Democratic member of the Delaware House of Representatives, representing District 4 from 2007 to 2022. He was elected in 2006 after the retirement of Republican Joseph G. Di Pinto.

Brady resigned from office in February 2022, stating that he had been suffering from post-traumatic stress disorder. The resignation followed the spread of leaked emails which showed him using racial slurs towards Asian Americans as well as a shoplifting investigation.

== Early life and education ==
Brady graduated from Salesianum School and King's College. He is a Chief Warrant Officer Four with the Delaware Army National Guard where he has served since 1981, and a Veteran of Operation Iraqi Freedom and the Counter War on Terrorism.

== Controversies ==
=== Use of racial slur ===
In June 2021, Brady referred to sex workers using the racist and misogynistic term "chink broads." These words were used in an email and was sent amidst rising anti-Asian sentiment in the US during the COVID-19 pandemic which had been the focus of national attention months earlier when eight people, six of whom were Asian women, were killed in the 2021 Atlanta spa shootings. Some criticisms of Brady's email noted the simultaneous use of an anti-Asian slur and misogynistic term, pointing out that racism and sexism against Asian American women are often intertwined. Brady announced he would not seek re-election for another term, but State Senator Sarah McBride and State Representative Madinah Wilson-Anton called on him to resign.

In response to the remarks, AFL-CIO president Liz Shuler called for Brady's resignation as Delaware State AFL-CIO Executive Director, a post he has held since 2003. On January 22, 2022, Brady announced he would resign his seat, effective January 31.

=== January 2022 arrest ===
On January 25, 2022, Brady was arrested by Newark police and charged with two counts of shoplifting. Brady stole a shopping cart full of firewood from Acme on December 29, 2021. He tried to steal more items at the same location on January 12, 2022, but this time, he was confronted by a store employee.

In May 2022, Brady was convicted of shoplifting and sentenced to two months probation.

== Electoral history ==
- In 2006, Brady won the Democratic primary with 746 votes (50.2%), and went on to win the general election with 4,053 votes (55.0%) against Republican nominee Gary Linarducci.
- In 2008, Brady won the general election with 7,174 votes (73.4%) against Republican nominee Tyler Nixon, who had also qualified and received votes as the Libertarian candidate.
- In 2010, Brady won the general election with 5,298 votes (65.8%) against Republican nominee Richard Carroll.
- In 2012, Brady was unopposed the general election, winning 9,133 votes.
- In 2014, Brady won the general election with 4,356 (59.7%) against Republican nominee Robert Keesler.
- In 2016, Brady was unopposed the general election, winning 9,565 votes.
- In 2018, Brady was unopposed the general election, winning 8,512 votes.
