= Melanie George Smith =

American politician

Member of the Delaware House of Representatives from the 5th district
- In office November 6, 2002 – November 7, 2018
- Preceded by: Helene Keeley
- Succeeded by: Kendra Johnson

Personal details
- Born: November 7, 1972 (age 53)
- Party: Democratic
- Education: University of Pennsylvania; Georgetown University Law Center
- Profession: Lawyer

Melanie George Smith (formerly Melanie George Marshall) is an American politician. She was a Democratic member of the Delaware House of Representatives from 2003 to 2019.

Smith was elected in 2002 to represent District 5 after winning the Democratic primary to replace Helene Keeley, who was running for the District 3 seat. The 2002 primary election was the last competitive race during her time in office, and she never faced an opponent in the general election.

In 2018, "dogged by questions about whether she still lived in the Bear district she represented," Smith announced would resign at the end of her term. Shortly before leaving office, she was criticized by open government advocates and Democratic Party officials for establishing a private business that would benefit from legislation she sponsored in her last month in office. She had previously stated that the legislation would not "have a material benefit for her" when advocating for the passage of the bill.

Smith earned her BA from the University of Pennsylvania and her JD from Georgetown University Law Center.
