= Independent Party of Delaware =

- Chairperson: Ben Woratlya
- Secretary: Laura Harrison
- Founded: August 29, 2000; 26 years ago

Website
- https://www.independentdelaware.org/

The Independent Party of Delaware (IPoD) is a political party in the State of Delaware, United States. As of August 2026, it is the third largest political party in Delaware with 12,578 registered voters.
