= 2008 Delaware House of Representatives election =

- November 4, 2008

All 41 seats in the Delaware House of Representatives 21 seats needed for a majority
	Majority party	Minority party
Leader	Robert Gilligan	Terry Spence (lost re-election)
Party	Democratic	Republican
Leader's seat	19th - Wilmington	18th- New Castle
Last election	18	23
Seats before	19	22
Seats won	25	16
Seat change	▲6	▼6
Popular vote	208,990	156,832
Percentage	56.87%	42.68%
- Results: Democratic gain Democratic hold Republican hold
Speaker before election
Terry Spence
Republican
Elected Speaker
Robert Gilligan
Democratic

An election was held on November 4, 2008, to elect all 41 members to Delaware's House of Representatives. The election coincided with elections for other offices, including for U.S. President, U.S. Senate, U.S. House of Representatives, Governor, Lieutenant Governor, and state senate. The primary election was held on September 9, 2008. Democrats regained control of the House after 24 years after gaining seven seats, winning 25 seats compared to 16 seats for the Republicans.

Representative Dianna Williams (D - District 6) announced immediately after the election that she would be resigning. A special election was held on December 20, 2008, to fill the seat, which Tom Kovach gained for Republicans.

Democrats took control of the Delaware House of Representatives for the first time since 1985, and won a trifecta for the first time since 1977.

== Results ==
District	Incumbent	Party	Elected Representative	Party
1st	Dennis Williams	Dem	Dennis Williams	Dem
2nd	Hazel Plant	Dem	Hazel Plant	Dem
3rd	Helene Keeley	Dem	Helene Keeley	Dem
4th	Gerald Brady	Dem	Gerald Brady	Dem
5th	Melanie George Marshall	Dem	Melanie George Marshall	Dem
6th	Diana McWilliams	Dem	Diana McWilliams	Dem
7th	Bryon Short	Dem	Bryon Short	Dem
8th	Bethany Hall-Long	Dem	Quinn Johnson	Dem
9th	Richard Cathcart	Rep	Richard Cathcart	Rep
10th	Robert Valihura	Rep	Dennis Williams	Dem
11th	Gregory Lavelle	Rep	Gregory Lavelle	Rep
12th	Deborah Hudson	Rep	Deborah Hudson	Rep
13th	Larry Mitchell	Dem	Larry Mitchell	Dem
14th	Peter Schwartzkopf	Dem	Peter Schwartzkopf	Dem
15th	Valerie Longhurst	Dem	Valerie Longhurst	Dem
16th	J.J. Johnson	Dem	J.J. Johnson	Dem
17th	Michael Mulrooney	Dem	Michael Mulrooney	Dem
18th	Terry Spence	Rep	Michael Barbieri	Dem
19th	Robert Gilligan	Dem	Robert Gilligan	Dem
20th	Nick Manolakos	Rep	Nick Manolakos	Rep
21st	Pamela Maier	Rep	Michael Ramone	Rep
22nd	Joseph Miró	Rep	Joseph Miró	Rep
23rd	Teresa Schooley	Dem	Teresa Schooley	Dem
24th	William Orbele Jr.	Rep	William Orbele Jr.	Rep
25th	John Kowalko Jr.	Dem	John Kowalko Jr.	Dem
26th	John Viola	Dem	John Viola	Dem
27th	Vincet Lofink	Rep	Earl Jaques Jr.	Dem
28th	William Carson Jr.	Dem	William Carson Jr.	Dem
29th	Pamela Thornburg	Rep	Pamela Thornburg	Rep
30th	William Outten	Rep	William Outten	Rep
31st	Nancy Wagner	Rep	Darryl Scott	Dem
32nd	Donna Stone	Rep	Brad Bennett	Dem
33rd	Robert Walls	Dem	Robert Walls	Dem
34th	Donald Blakey	Rep	Donald Blakey	Rep
35th	J. Benjamin Ewing	Rep	David Wilson	Rep
36th	V. George Carey	Rep	V. George Carey	Rep
37th	Joseph Booth	Rep	Joseph Booth	Rep
38th	Gerald Hocker	Rep	Gerald Hocker	Rep
39th	Daniel Short	Rep	Daniel Short	Rep
40th	Clifford Lee	Rep	Clifford Lee	Rep
41st	Gregory Hastings	Rep	John Atkins	Dem

=== Statewide ===
Party	Candi- dates	Votes	%	Seats	+/–
Democratic	37	208,990	56.87%	25	▲7
Republican	32	156,832	42.68%	16	▼7
Independent	2	642	0.17%	0	Steady
Working Families	5	431	0.12%	0	Steady
Blue Enigma	3	346	0.09%	0	Steady
Libertarian	2	243	0.07%	0	Steady
Total	81	367,484	100%	41	Steady

== Predictions ==
Source	Ranking	As of
Stateline	Lean D (flip)	October 15, 2008

== Detailed Results ==
Results of the 2008 Delaware House of Representatives election by district:

=== District 1 ===
Incumbent Democrat Dennis Williams has represented the 1st district since 1994.

Delaware House of Representatives 1st district general election, 2008
Party	Candidate	Votes	%
Democratic	Dennis Williams (incumbent)	7,422	91.09%
Republican	James McClain Jr.	726	8.91%
Total votes		8,148	100%
Democratic hold			

=== District 2 ===
Incumbent Democrat Hazel Plant has represented the 2nd district since 2000.

Delaware House of Representatives 2nd district general election, 2008
Party	Candidate	Votes	%
Democratic	Hazel Plant (incumbent)	5,729	94.26%
Independent Party	Robert Brown	349	5.74%
Total votes		6,078	100%
Democratic hold			

=== District 3 ===
Incumbent Democrat Helene Keeley has represented the 3rd district and its predecessors since 1996.

Delaware House of Representatives 3rd district general election, 2008
Party	Candidate	Votes	%
Democratic	Helene Keeley (incumbent)	5,419	100%
Total votes		5,419	100%
Democratic hold			

=== District 4 ===
Incumbent Democrat Gerald Brady has represented the 4th district since 2006.

Delaware House of Representatives 4th district general election, 2008
Party	Candidate	Votes	%
Democratic	Gerald Brady (incumbent)	7,174	73.36%
Republican	Tyler Patrick Nixon (Note: Also nominated by the Libertarian Party.)	2,605	26.64%
Total votes		9,779	100%
Democratic hold			

=== District 5 ===
Incumbent Democrat Melanie George Marshall has represented the 5th district since 2002.

Delaware House of Representatives 5th district general election, 2008
Party	Candidate	Votes	%
Democratic	Melanie George Marshall (incumbent)	7,212	100%
Total votes		7,212	100%
Democratic hold			

=== District 6 ===
Incumbent Democrat Diana McWilliams has represented the 6th district since 2004.

Delaware House of Representatives 6th district general election, 2008
Party	Candidate	Votes	%
Democratic	Diana McWilliams (incumbent)	8,331	100%
Total votes		8,331	100%
Democratic hold			

=== District 7 ===
Incumbent Democrat Bryon Short has represented the 7th district since winning a 2007 special election.

Delaware House of Representatives 7th district general election, 2008
Party	Candidate	Votes	%
Democratic	Bryon Short (incumbent)	6,281	58.57%
Republican	James Bowers	4,443	41.43%
Total votes		10,724	100%
Democratic hold			

=== District 8 ===
Incumbent Democrat Bethany Hall-Long has represented the 8th district since 2002. Hall-Long retired to run for the state senate and fellow Democrat Quinn Johnson won the open seat.

Delaware House of Representatives 8th district general election, 2008
Party	Candidate	Votes	%
Democratic	Quinn Johnson	7,524	57.24%
Republican	Martha Sturtevant	5,621	42.76%
Total votes		13,145	100%
Democratic hold			

=== District 9 ===
Incumbent Republican Richard Cathcart has represented the 9th district since 1998.

Delaware House of Representatives 9th district general election, 2008
Party	Candidate	Votes	%
Republican	Richard Cathcart (incumbent)	7,436	53.84%
Democratic	Rebecca Walker	6,375	46.16%
Total votes		13,811	100%
Republican hold			

=== District 10 ===
Incumbent Republican Robert Valihura Jr. has represented the 10th district since 1998. Valihura lost re-election to Democrat Dennis Williams.

Delaware House of Representatives 10th district general election, 2008
Party	Candidate	Votes	%
Democratic	Dennis Williams (Note: Also nominated by the Working Families Party.)	5,091	50.97%
Republican	Robert Valihura Jr. (incumbent)	4,898	49.03%
Total votes		9,989	100%
Democratic gain from Republican			

=== District 11 ===
Incumbent Republican Gregory Lavelle has represented the 11th district since 2001.

Delaware House of Representatives 11th district general election, 2008
Party	Candidate	Votes	%
Republican	Gregory Lavelle (incumbent)	6,731	63.34%
Democratic	Charles Old Jr.	3,895	36.66%
Total votes		10,626	100%
Republican hold			

=== District 12 ===
Incumbent Republican Deborah Hudson has represented the 12th district since 1994.

Delaware House of Representatives 12th district general election, 2008
Party	Candidate	Votes	%
Republican	Deborah Hudson (incumbent)	7,428	100%
Total votes		7,428	100%
Republican hold			

=== District 13 ===
Incumbent Democrat Larry Mitchell has represented the 13th district since 2006.

Delaware House of Representatives 13th district general election, 2008
Party	Candidate	Votes	%
Democratic	Larry Mitchell (incumbent)	6,547	96.14%
Blue Enigma	Jeffrey Brown	263	3.86%
Total votes		6,810	100%
Democratic hold			

=== District 14 ===
Incumbent Democratic Majority Leader Peter Schwartzkopf has represented the 14th district since 2002.

Delaware House of Representatives 14th district general election, 2008
Party	Candidate	Votes	%
Democratic	Peter Schwartzkopf (incumbent)	10,616	100%
Total votes		10,616	100%
Democratic hold			

=== District 15 ===
Incumbent Democrat Valerie Longhurst has represented the 15th district since 2004.

Delaware House of Representatives 15th district general election, 2008
Party	Candidate	Votes	%
Democratic	Valerie Longhurst (incumbent)	10,570	100%
Total votes		10,570	100%
Democratic hold			

=== District 16 ===
Incumbent Democrat J.J. Johnson has represented the 16th district since 2004.

Delaware House of Representatives 16th district general election, 2008
Party	Candidate	Votes	%
Democratic	J.J. Johnson (incumbent)	7,078	100%
Total votes		7,078	100%
Democratic hold			

=== District 17 ===
Incumbent Democrat Michael Mulrooney has represented the 17th district since 1998.

Delaware House of Representatives 17th district general election, 2008
Party	Candidate	Votes	%
Democratic	Michael Mulrooney (incumbent)	6,981	83.41%
Republican	David Lee Osborn	1,388	16.59%
Total votes		8,369	100%
Democratic hold			

=== District 18 ===
Incumbent Republican House Speaker Terry Spence has represented the 18th district and its predecessors since 1980. Spence lost re-election to Democrat Michael Barbieri.

Delaware House of Representatives 18th district general election, 2008
Party	Candidate	Votes	%
Democratic	Michael Barbieri	4,164	51.99%
Republican	Terry Spence (incumbent) (Note: Also nominated by the Working Families Party.)	3,845	48.01%
Total votes		8,009	100%
Democratic gain from Republican			

=== District 19 ===
Incumbent Democrat House Speaker Robert Gilligan has represented the 19th district since 1972.

Delaware House of Representatives 19th district general election, 2008
Party	Candidate	Votes	%
Democratic	Robert Gilligan (incumbent)	6,482	78.38%
Republican	Joseph Sakeley	1,729	20.91%
Blue Enigma	Stephen Michael Annand	59	0.71%
Total votes		8,270	100%
Democratic hold			

=== District 20 ===
Incumbent Republican Nick Manolakos has represented the 20th district since 2006.

Delaware House of Representatives 20th district general election, 2008
Party	Candidate	Votes	%
Republican	Nick Manolakos (incumbent)	8,045	99.70%
Blue Enigma	Daniel Rappa Jr.	24	0.30%
Total votes		8,069	100%
Republican hold			

=== District 21 ===
Incumbent Republican Pamela Maier has represented the 21st district since 1994. Maier didn't seek re-election and fellow Republican Michael Ramone won the open seat.

Delaware House of Representatives 21st district general election, 2008
Party	Candidate	Votes	%
Republican	Michael Ramone	5,474	55.14%
Democratic	Patricia Creedon	4,454	44.86%
Total votes		9,928	100%
Republican hold			

=== District 22 ===
Incumbent Republicans Joseph Miró has represented the 22nd district since 1998.

Delaware House of Representatives 22nd district general election, 2008
Party	Candidate	Votes	%
Republican	Joseph Miró (incumbent)	6,999	66.13%
Democratic	Rebecca Young	3,585	33.87%
Total votes		10,584	100%
Republican hold			

=== District 23 ===
Incumbent Democrat Teresa Schooley has represented the 23rd district since 2004.

Delaware House of Representatives 23rd district general election, 2008
Party	Candidate	Votes	%
Democratic	Teresa Schooley (incumbent)	6,098	74.95%
Republican	Jesse Priester IV (Note: Also nominated by the Libertarian Party.)	2,038	25.05%
Total votes		8,136	100%
Democratic hold			

=== District 24 ===
Incumbent Republican William Orbele Jr. has represented the 24th district since 1976.

Delaware House of Representatives 24th district general election, 2008
Party	Candidate	Votes	%
Republican	William Orbele Jr. (incumbent) (Note: Also nominated by the Working Families Party.)	4,057	54.01%
Democratic	Daniel Basara	3,455	45.99%
Total votes		7,512	100%
Republican hold			

=== District 25 ===
Incumbent Democrat John Kowalko Jr. has represented the 25th district since 2006.

Delaware House of Representatives 25th district general election, 2008
Party	Candidate	Votes	%
Democratic	John Kowalko Jr. (incumbent)	5,008	73.39%
Republican	James Gates	1,816	26.61%
Total votes		6,824	100%
Democratic hold			

=== District 26 ===
Incumbent Democrat John Viola has represented the 26th district since 1998.

Delaware House of Representatives 26th district general election, 2008
Party	Candidate	Votes	%
Democratic	John Viola (incumbent)	6,316	79.93%
Republican	Jeremy Filliben	1,586	20.07%
Total votes		7,902	100%
Democratic hold			

=== District 27 ===
Incumbent Republican Vincet Lofink has represented the 27th district since 1990. Lofink lost re-election to Democrat Earl Jaques Jr..

Delaware House of Representatives 27th district general election, 2008
Party	Candidate	Votes	%
Democratic	Earl Jaques Jr.	4,708	48.72%
Republican	Vincet Lofink (incumbent) (Note: Also nominated by the Working Families Party.)	4,662	48.25%
Independent Party	James Spencer	293	3.03%
Total votes		9,663	100%
Democratic gain from Republican			

=== District 28 ===
Incumbent Democrat Bruce Ennis has represented the 28th district since 1982. Ennis retired to run for the state senate and fellow Democrat William Carson Jr. won the open seat.

Delaware House of Representatives 28th district general election, 2008
Party	Candidate	Votes	%
Democratic	William Carson Jr.	7,198	100%
Total votes		7,198	100%
Democratic hold			

=== District 29 ===
Incumbent Republican Pamela Thornburg has represented the 29th district since 2000.

Delaware House of Representatives 29th district general election, 2008
Party	Candidate	Votes	%
Republican	Pamela Thornburg (incumbent)	5,624	50.22%
Democratic	Charles Paradee	5,574	49.78%
Total votes		11,198	100%
Republican hold			

=== District 30 ===
Incumbent Republican William Outten has represented the 30th district since 2004.

Delaware House of Representatives 30th district general election, 2008
Party	Candidate	Votes	%
Republican	William Outten (incumbent)	6,921	100%
Total votes		6,921	100%
Republican hold			

=== District 31 ===
Incumbent Republican Nancy Wagner has represented the 31st district since 1992. Wagner lost re-election to Democrat Darryl Scott.

Delaware House of Representatives 31st district general election, 2008
Party	Candidate	Votes	%
Democratic	Darryl Scott	4,372	52.64%
Republican	Nancy Wagner (incumbent)	3,934	47.36%
Total votes		8,306	100%
Democratic gain from Republican			

=== District 32 ===
Incumbent Republican Donna Stone has represented the 32nd district since 1994. Stone lost re-election to Democrat Brad Bennett.

Delaware House of Representatives 32nd district general election, 2008
Party	Candidate	Votes	%
Democratic	Brad Bennett	3,742	57.03%
Republican	Donna Stone (incumbent)	2,820	42.97%
Total votes		6,562	100%
Democratic gain from Republican			

=== District 33 ===
Incumbent Democrat Robert Walls has represented the 33rd district since 2006.

Delaware House of Representatives 33rd district general election, 2008
Party	Candidate	Votes	%
Democratic	Robert Walls (incumbent)	5,546	53.66%
Republican	Harold Peterman	4,790	46.34%
Total votes		10,336	100%
Democratic hold			

=== District 34 ===
Incumbent Republican Donald Blakey has represented the 34th district since 2006.

Delaware House of Representatives 34th district general election, 2008
Party	Candidate	Votes	%
Republican	Donald Blakey (incumbent)	6,229	61.30%
Democratic	G. Bruce Hamilton	3,933	38.70%
Total votes		10,162	100%
Republican hold			

=== District 35 ===
Incumbent Republican J. Benjamin Ewing has represented the 35th district since 1986. Ewing didn't seek re-election and fellow Republican David Wilson won the open seat.

Delaware House of Representatives 35th district general election, 2008
Party	Candidate	Votes	%
Republican	David Wilson	5,174	60.98%
Democratic	L. Aaron Chaffinch	3,311	39.02%
Total votes		8,485	100%
Republican hold			

=== District 36 ===
Incumbent Republican V. George Carey has represented the 36th district since 1984.

Delaware House of Representatives 36th district general election, 2008
Party	Candidate	Votes	%
Republican	V. George Carey (incumbent)	8,963	100%
Total votes		8,963	100%
Republican hold			

=== District 37 ===
Incumbent Republican Joseph Booth has represented the th district since 2002.

Delaware House of Representatives 37th district general election, 2008
Party	Candidate	Votes	%
Republican	Joseph Booth (incumbent)	6,242	64.20%
Democratic	Helen Truitt	3,480	35.80%
Total votes		9,722	100%
Republican hold			

=== District 38 ===
Incumbent Republican Gerald Hocker has represented the 38th district since 2002.

Delaware House of Representatives 38th district general election, 2008
Party	Candidate	Votes	%
Republican	Gerald Hocker (incumbent)	9,769	72.08%
Democratic	Mary Ryan	3,784	27.92%
Total votes		13,553	100%
Republican hold			

=== District 39 ===
Incumbent Republican Daniel Short has represented the 39th district since 2006.

Delaware House of Representatives 39th district general election, 2008
Party	Candidate	Votes	%
Republican	Daniel Short (incumbent)	5,185	68.79%
Democratic	Jerry Semper (Note: Also nominated by the Working Families Party.)	2,352	31.21%
Total votes		7,537	100%
Republican hold			

=== District 40 ===
Incumbent Republican Clifford Lee has represented the 40th district since 1990.

Delaware House of Representatives 40th district general election, 2008
Party	Candidate	Votes	%
Republican	Clifford Lee (incumbent)	5,191	58.85%
Democratic	Barbara Hudson	3,630	41.15%
Total votes		8,821	100%
Republican hold			

=== District 41 ===
Incumbent Republican Gregory Hastings has represented the 41st district since winning a special election in May 2007. Hastings lost re-election to his predecessor, John Atkins, now a member of the Democratic Party. Democratic primary

Delaware House of Representatives 41st district Democratic primary election, 2008
Party	Candidate	Votes	%
Democratic	John Atkins	1,095	53.86%
Democratic	Barbara Lifflander	938	46.14%
Total votes		2,033	100%

General election

Delaware House of Representatives 41st district general election, 2008
Party	Candidate	Votes	%
Democratic	John Atkins	5,665	52.99%
Republican	Gregory Hastings (incumbent)	5,025	47.01%
Total votes		10,690	100%
Democratic gain from Republican			
