= 2006 Delaware House of Representatives election =

- November 7, 2006

All 41 seats in the Delaware House of Representatives 21 seats needed for a majority
| | Majority party | Minority party |
|---|---|---|
| Leader | Terry Spence | Robert Gilligan |
| Party | Republican | Democratic |
| Leader's seat | 18th- New Castle | 19th - Wilmington |
| Last election | 26 | 15 |
| Seats before | 25 (Note: Wallace Caulk Jr. left the Republican Party to become an Independent.) | 15 |
| Seats won | 23 | 18 |
| Seat change | ▼2 | ▲3 |
| Popular vote | 117,161 | 118,329 |
| Percentage | 49.54% | 50.03% |
- Results: Democratic gain Republican hold Democratic hold
Speaker before election
Terry Spence
Republican
Elected Speaker
Terry Spence
Republican

An election was held on November 7, 2006, to elect all 41 members to Delaware's House of Representatives. The election coincided with elections for other offices, including for U.S. Senate, U.S. House of Representatives, and state senate. The primary election was held on September 12, 2006.

== Results ==
| District | Incumbent | Party | Elected Representative | Party |
|---|---|---|---|---|
| 1st | Dennis Williams | Dem | Dennis Williams | Dem |
| 2nd | Hazel Plant | Dem | Hazel Plant | Dem |
| 3rd | Helene Keeley | Dem | Helene Keeley | Dem |
| 4th | Joseph G. Di Pinto | Rep | Gerald Brady | Dem |
| 5th | Melanie George Marshall | Dem | Melanie George Marshall | Dem |
| 6th | Diana McWilliams | Dem | Diana McWilliams | Dem |
| 7th | Wayne Smith | Rep | Wayne Smith | Rep |
| 8th | Bethany Hall-Long | Dem | Bethany Hall-Long | Dem |
| 9th | Richard Cathcart | Rep | Richard Cathcart | Rep |
| 10th | Robert Valihura Jr. | Rep | Robert Valihura Jr. | Rep |
| 11th | Gregory Lavelle | Rep | Gregory Lavelle | Rep |
| 12th | Deborah Hudson | Rep | Deborah Hudson | Rep |
| 13th | John Van Sant III | Dem | Larry Mitchell | Dem |
| 14th | Peter Schwartzkopf | Dem | Peter Schwartzkopf | Dem |
| 15th | Valerie Longhurst | Dem | Valerie Longhurst | Dem |
| 16th | J.J. Johnson | Dem | J.J. Johnson | Dem |
| 17th | Michael Mulrooney | Dem | Michael Mulrooney | Dem |
| 18th | Terry Spence | Rep | Terry Spence | Rep |
| 19th | Robert Gilligan | Dem | Robert Gilligan | Dem |
| 20th | Roger Roy | Rep | Nick Manolakos | Rep |
| 21st | Pamela Maier | Rep | Pamela Maier | Rep |
| 22nd | Joseph Miró | Rep | Joseph Miró | Rep |
| 23rd | Teresa Schooley | Dem | Teresa Schooley | Dem |
| 24th | William Orbele Jr. | Rep | William Orbele Jr. | Rep |
| 25th | Stephanie Ulbrich | Rep | John Kowalko Jr. | Dem |
| 26th | John Viola | Dem | John Viola | Dem |
| 27th | Vincet Lofink | Rep | Vincet Lofink | Rep |
| 28th | Bruce Ennis | Dem | Bruce Ennis | Dem |
| 29th | Pamela Thornburg | Rep | Pamela Thornburg | Rep |
| 30th | William Outten | Rep | William Outten | Rep |
| 31st | Nancy Wagner | Rep | Nancy Wagner | Rep |
| 32nd | Donna Stone | Rep | Donna Stone | Rep |
| 33rd | Wallace Caulk Jr. | Ind | Robert Walls | Dem |
| 34th | Gerald Buckworth | Rep | Donald Blakey | Rep |
| 35th | J. Benjamin Ewing | Rep | David Wilson | Rep |
| 36th | V. George Carey | Rep | V. George Carey | Rep |
| 37th | Joseph Booth | Rep | Joseph Booth | Rep |
| 38th | Gerald Hocker | Rep | Gerald Hocker | Rep |
| 39th | Tina Fallon | Rep | Daniel Short | Rep |
| 40th | Clifford Lee | Rep | Clifford Lee | Rep |
| 41st | John Atkins | Rep | John Atkins | Rep |

=== Statewide ===
| Party | Candi- dates | Votes | % | Seats | +/– |
|---|---|---|---|---|---|
| Republican | 32 | 117,161 | 49.54% | 23 | ▼2 |
| Democratic | 33 | 118,329 | 50.03% | 18 | ▲3 |
| Libertarian | 1 | 686 | 0.29% | 0 | Steady |
| Independent | 2 | 331 | 0.14% | 0 | Steady |
| Total | 68 | 236,507 | 100% | 41 | Steady |

== Predictions ==
| Source | Ranking | As of |
|---|---|---|
| Rothenberg | Likely R | November 4, 2006 |

== Detailed Results ==
Results of the 2006 Delaware House of Representatives election by district:

=== District 1 ===
Incumbent Democrat Dennis Williams has represented the 1st district since 1994. Democratic primary

Delaware House of Representatives 1st district Democratic primary election, 2006
| Party | Candidate | Votes | % |
|---|---|---|---|
| Democratic | Dennis Williams (incumbent) | 1,346 | 74.99% |
| Democratic | Vincent White | 449 | 25.01% |
| Total votes | | 1,795 | 100% |

General election

Delaware House of Representatives 1st district general election, 2006
| Party | Candidate | Votes | % |
|---|---|---|---|
| Democratic | Dennis Williams (incumbent) | 4,695 | 100% |
| Total votes | | 4,695 | 100% |
| Democratic hold | | | |

=== District 2 ===
Incumbent Democrat Hazel Plant has represented the 2nd district since 2000. Democratic primary

Delaware House of Representatives 2nd district Democratic primary election, 2006
| Party | Candidate | Votes | % |
|---|---|---|---|
| Democratic | Hazel Plant (incumbent) | 601 | 73.74% |
| Democratic | Donald Farrell | 214 | 26.26% |
| Total votes | | 815 | 100% |

General election

Delaware House of Representatives 2nd district general election, 2006
| Party | Candidate | Votes | % |
|---|---|---|---|
| Democratic | Hazel Plant (incumbent) | 3,094 | 100% |
| Total votes | | 3,094 | 100% |
| Democratic hold | | | |

=== District 3 ===
Incumbent Democrat Helene Keeley has represented the 3rd district and its predecessors since 1996. Democratic primary

Delaware House of Representatives 3rd district Democratic primary election, 2006
| Party | Candidate | Votes | % |
|---|---|---|---|
| Democratic | Helene Keeley (incumbent) | 600 | 59.23% |
| Democratic | Robert Bovell | 413 | 40.77% |
| Total votes | | 1,013 | 100% |

General election
Incumbent Democrat Helene Keeley has represented the 3rd district and its predecessors since 1996.

Delaware House of Representatives 3rd district general election, 2006
| Party | Candidate | Votes | % |
|---|---|---|---|
| Democratic | Helene Keeley (incumbent) | 2,828 | 100% |
| Total votes | | 2,828 | 100% |
| Democratic hold | | | |

=== District 4 ===
Incumbent Republican Joseph G. Di Pinto has represented the 4th district since 1986. DiPinto didn't seek re-election and Democrat Gerald Brady won the open seat. Democratic primary

Delaware House of Representatives 4th district Democratic primary election, 2006
| Party | Candidate | Votes | % |
|---|---|---|---|
| Democratic | Gerald Brady | 746 | 50.20% |
| Democratic | Loretta Walsh | 676 | 45.49% |
| Democratic | Joseph Zilcosky | 64 | 4.31% |
| Total votes | | 1,486 | 100% |

General election

Delaware House of Representatives 4th district general election, 2006
| Party | Candidate | Votes | % |
|---|---|---|---|
| Democratic | Gerald Brady | 4,053 | 54.99% |
| Republican | Gary Linarducci | 3,317 | 45.01% |
| Total votes | | 7,370 | 100% |
| Democratic gain from Republican | | | |

=== District 5 ===
Incumbent Democrat Melanie George Marshall has represented the 5th district since 2002.

Delaware House of Representatives 5th district general election, 2006
| Party | Candidate | Votes | % |
|---|---|---|---|
| Democratic | Melanie George Marshall (incumbent) | 3,568 | 100% |
| Total votes | | 3,568 | 100% |
| Democratic hold | | | |

=== District 6 ===
Incumbent Democrat Diana McWilliams has represented the 6th district since 2004. Democratic primary

Delaware House of Representatives 6th district Democratic primary election, 2006
| Party | Candidate | Votes | % |
|---|---|---|---|
| Democratic | Diana McWilliams (incumbent) | 652 | 83.16% |
| Democratic | Michael Dore | 132 | 16.84% |
| Total votes | | 784 | 100% |

General election

Delaware House of Representatives 6th district general election, 2006
| Party | Candidate | Votes | % |
|---|---|---|---|
| Democratic | Diana McWilliams (incumbent) | 4,559 | 61.31% |
| Republican | W. E. Smith | 2,647 | 35.59% |
| Independent Party | Michael Dore | 231 | 3.11% |
| Total votes | | 7,437 | 100% |
| Democratic hold | | | |

=== District 7 ===
Incumbent Republican and Majority Leader Wayne Smith has represented the 7th district since 1990. Democratic primary

Delaware House of Representatives 7th district Democratic primary election, 2006
| Party | Candidate | Votes | % |
|---|---|---|---|
| Democratic | Carl Colantuono | 408 | 74.73% |
| Democratic | Fred Jeffrey Boykin | 138 | 25.27% |
| Total votes | | 546 | 100% |

General election

Delaware House of Representatives 7th district general election, 2006
| Party | Candidate | Votes | % |
|---|---|---|---|
| Republican | Wayne Smith (incumbent) | 4,526 | 55.28% |
| Democratic | Carl Colantuono | 3,662 | 44.72% |
| Total votes | | 8,188 | 100% |
| Republican hold | | | |

=== District 8 ===
Incumbent Democrat Bethany Hall-Long has represented the 8th district since 2002.

Delaware House of Representatives 8th district general election, 2006
| Party | Candidate | Votes | % |
|---|---|---|---|
| Democratic | Bethany Hall-Long (incumbent) | 5,864 | 77.04% |
| Republican | Edward Colaprete | 1,748 | 22.96% |
| Total votes | | 7,612 | 100% |
| Democratic hold | | | |

=== District 9 ===
Incumbent Republican Richard Cathcart has represented the 9th district since 1998.

Delaware House of Representatives 9th district general election, 2006
| Party | Candidate | Votes | % |
|---|---|---|---|
| Republican | Richard Cathcart (incumbent) | 4,416 | 53.47% |
| Democratic | Rebecca Walker | 3,843 | 46.53% |
| Total votes | | 8,259 | 100% |
| Republican hold | | | |

=== District 10 ===
Incumbent Republican Robert Valihura Jr. has represented the 10th district since 1998.

Delaware House of Representatives 10th district general election, 2006
| Party | Candidate | Votes | % |
|---|---|---|---|
| Republican | Robert Valihura Jr. (incumbent) | 4,101 | 56.76% |
| Democratic | Francis Murphy | 3,124 | 43.24% |
| Total votes | | 7,225 | 100% |
| Republican hold | | | |

=== District 11 ===
Incumbent Republican Gregory Lavelle has represented the 11th district since 2001.

Delaware House of Representatives 11th district general election, 2006
| Party | Candidate | Votes | % |
|---|---|---|---|
| Republican | Gregory Lavelle (incumbent) | 4,635 | 57.97% |
| Democratic | Eric Levin | 3,360 | 42.03% |
| Total votes | | 7,995 | 100% |
| Republican hold | | | |

=== District 12 ===
Incumbent Republican Deborah Hudson has represented the 12th district since 1994.

Delaware House of Representatives 12th district general election, 2006
| Party | Candidate | Votes | % |
|---|---|---|---|
| Republican | Deborah Hudson (incumbent) | 5,133 | 64.68% |
| Democratic | Harry Gravell | 2,803 | 35.32% |
| Total votes | | 7,936 | 100% |
| Republican hold | | | |

=== District 13 ===
Incumbent Democrat John Van Sant III has represented the 13th district since 1982. Van Sant didn't seek re-election and fellow Democrat Larry Mitchell won the open seat. Democratic primary

Delaware House of Representatives 13th district Democratic primary election, 2006
| Party | Candidate | Votes | % |
|---|---|---|---|
| Democratic | Larry Mitchell | 375 | 41.67% |
| Democratic | Edward Doyle Jr. | 349 | 38.78% |
| Democratic | W. P. Mahon | 176 | 19.56% |
| Total votes | | 900 | 100% |

General election

Delaware House of Representatives 13th district general election, 2006
| Party | Candidate | Votes | % |
|---|---|---|---|
| Democratic | Larry Mitchell | 3,126 | 59.65% |
| Republican | John Jaremchuk Jr. | 2,115 | 40.35% |
| Total votes | | 5,241 | 100% |
| Democratic hold | | | |

=== District 14 ===
Incumbent Democrat Peter Schwartzkopf has represented the 14th district since 2002.

Delaware House of Representatives 14th district general election, 2006
| Party | Candidate | Votes | % |
|---|---|---|---|
| Democratic | Peter Schwartzkopf (incumbent) | 6,610 | 69.23% |
| Republican | Kirk Pope Jr. | 2,838 | 29.72% |
| Independent Party | Maurice Barros | 100 | 1.05% |
| Total votes | | 9,548 | 100% |
| Democratic hold | | | |

=== District 15 ===
Incumbent Democrat Valerie Longhurst has represented the 15th district since 2004.

Delaware House of Representatives 15th district general election, 2006
| Party | Candidate | Votes | % |
|---|---|---|---|
| Democratic | Valerie Longhurst (incumbent) | 5,195 | 74.19% |
| Republican | Laura Brown | 1,807 | 25.81% |
| Total votes | | 7,002 | 100% |
| Democratic hold | | | |

=== District 16 ===
Incumbent Democrat J.J. Johnson has represented the 16th district since 2004.

Delaware House of Representatives 16th district general election, 2006
| Party | Candidate | Votes | % |
|---|---|---|---|
| Democratic | J.J. Johnson (incumbent) | 4,221 | 100% |
| Total votes | | 4,221 | 100% |
| Democratic hold | | | |

=== District 17 ===
Incumbent Democrat Michael Mulrooney has represented the 17th district since 1998.

Delaware House of Representatives 17th district general election, 2006
| Party | Candidate | Votes | % |
|---|---|---|---|
| Democratic | Michael Mulrooney (incumbent) | 4,619 | 84.24% |
| Republican | David Lee Osborn | 864 | 15.76% |
| Total votes | | 5,483 | 100% |
| Democratic hold | | | |

=== District 18 ===
Incumbent Republican and House Speaker Terry Spence has represented the 18th district and its predecessors since 1980.

Delaware House of Representatives 18th district general election, 2006
| Party | Candidate | Votes | % |
|---|---|---|---|
| Republican | Terry Spence (incumbent) | 2,724 | 56.20% |
| Democratic | Michael Barbieri | 2,123 | 43.80% |
| Total votes | | 4,847 | 100% |
| Republican hold | | | |

=== District 19 ===
Incumbent Democrat and Minority Leader Robert Gilligan has represented the 19th district since 1972.

Delaware House of Representatives 19th district general election, 2006
| Party | Candidate | Votes | % |
|---|---|---|---|
| Democratic | Robert Gilligan (incumbent) | 4,896 | 100% |
| Total votes | | 4,896 | 100% |
| Democratic hold | | | |

=== District 20 ===
Incumbent Republican Roger Roy has represented the 20th district since 1976. Roy didn't seek re-election and fellow Republican Nick Manolakos won the open seat. Republican primary

Delaware House of Representatives 20th district Republican primary election, 2006
| Party | Candidate | Votes | % |
|---|---|---|---|
| Republican | Nick Manolakos | 520 | 59.36% |
| Republican | Brian Moore | 356 | 40.64% |
| Total votes | | 876 | 100% |

General election

Delaware House of Representatives 20th district general election, 2006
| Party | Candidate | Votes | % |
|---|---|---|---|
| Republican | Nick Manolakos | 4,709 | 56.47% |
| Democratic | Richard Korn | 3,630 | 43.53% |
| Total votes | | 8,339 | 100% |
| Republican hold | | | |

=== District 21 ===
Incumbent Republican Pamela Maier has represented the 21st district since 1994.

Delaware House of Representatives 21st district general election, 2006
| Party | Candidate | Votes | % |
|---|---|---|---|
| Republican | Pamela Maier (incumbent) | 5,164 | 100% |
| Total votes | | 5,164 | 100% |
| Republican hold | | | |

=== District 22 ===
Incumbent Republicans Joseph Miró has represented the 22nd district since 1998.

Delaware House of Representatives 22nd district general election, 2006
| Party | Candidate | Votes | % |
|---|---|---|---|
| Republican | Joseph Miró (incumbent) | 5,471 | 88.86% |
| Libertarian | David Okner | 686 | 11.14% |
| Total votes | | 6,157 | 100% |
| Republican hold | | | |

=== District 23 ===
Incumbent Democrat Teresa Schooley has represented the 23rd district since 2004.

Delaware House of Representatives 23rd district general election, 2006
| Party | Candidate | Votes | % |
|---|---|---|---|
| Democratic | Teresa Schooley (incumbent) | 5,143 | 100% |
| Total votes | | 5,143 | 100% |
| Democratic hold | | | |

=== District 24 ===
Incumbent Republican William Orbele Jr. has represented the 24th district since 1976.

Delaware House of Representatives 24th district general election, 2006
| Party | Candidate | Votes | % |
|---|---|---|---|
| Republican | William Orbele Jr. (incumbent) | 2,822 | 100% |
| Total votes | | 2,822 | 100% |
| Republican hold | | | |

=== District 25 ===
Incumbent Republican Stephanie Ulbrich has represented the 25th district since 1994. Ulbrich lost re-election to Democrat John Kowalko Jr.

Delaware House of Representatives 25th district general election, 2006
| Party | Candidate | Votes | % |
|---|---|---|---|
| Democratic | John Kowalko Jr. | 2,473 | 52.00% |
| Republican | Stephanie Ulbrich (incumbent) | 2,283 | 48.00% |
| Total votes | | 4,756 | 100% |
| Democratic gain from Republican | | | |

=== District 26 ===
Incumbent Democrat John Viola has represented the 26th district since 1998. Democratic primary

Delaware House of Representatives 26th district Democratic primary election, 2006
| Party | Candidate | Votes | % |
|---|---|---|---|
| Democratic | John Viola (incumbent) | 381 | 58.53% |
| Democratic | Charles Tucker | 270 | 41.47% |
| Total votes | | 651 | 100% |

General election

Delaware House of Representatives 26th district general election, 2006
| Party | Candidate | Votes | % |
|---|---|---|---|
| Democratic | John Viola (incumbent) | 3,795 | 100% |
| Total votes | | 3,795 | 100% |
| Democratic hold | | | |

=== District 27 ===
Incumbent Republican Vincet Lofink has represented the 27th district since 1990.

Delaware House of Representatives 27th district general election, 2006
| Party | Candidate | Votes | % |
|---|---|---|---|
| Republican | Vincet Lofink (incumbent) | 3,049 | 51.07% |
| Democratic | Earl Jaques Jr. | 2,921 | 48.93% |
| Total votes | | 5,970 | 100% |
| Republican hold | | | |

=== District 28 ===
Incumbent Democrat Bruce Ennis has represented the 28th district since 1982.

Delaware House of Representatives 28th district general election, 2006
| Party | Candidate | Votes | % |
|---|---|---|---|
| Democratic | Bruce Ennis (incumbent) | 4,343 | 100% |
| Total votes | | 4,343 | 100% |
| Democratic hold | | | |

=== District 29 ===
Incumbent Republican Pamela Thornburg has represented the 29th district since 2000.

Delaware House of Representatives 29th district general election, 2006
| Party | Candidate | Votes | % |
|---|---|---|---|
| Republican | Pamela Thornburg (incumbent) | 4,764 | 100% |
| Total votes | | 4,764 | 100% |
| Republican hold | | | |

=== District 30 ===
Incumbent Republican William Outten has represented the 30th district since 2004.

Delaware House of Representatives 30th district general election, 2006
| Party | Candidate | Votes | % |
|---|---|---|---|
| Republican | William Outten (incumbent) | 3,521 | 63.35% |
| Democratic | Robert Price | 2,037 | 36.65% |
| Total votes | | 5,558 | 100% |
| Republican hold | | | |

=== District 31 ===
Incumbent Republican Nancy Wagner has represented the 31st district since 1992.

Delaware House of Representatives 31st district general election, 2006
| Party | Candidate | Votes | % |
|---|---|---|---|
| Republican | Nancy Wagner (incumbent) | 2,829 | 54.51% |
| Democratic | Prameela Kaza | 2,361 | 45.49% |
| Total votes | | 5,190 | 100% |
| Republican hold | | | |

=== District 32 ===
Incumbent Republican Donna Stone has represented the 32nd district since 1994.

Delaware House of Representatives 32nd district general election, 2006
| Party | Candidate | Votes | % |
|---|---|---|---|
| Republican | Donna Stone (incumbent) | 2,805 | 100% |
| Total votes | | 2,805 | 100% |
| Republican hold | | | |

=== District 33 ===
Incumbent Republican turned Independent Wallace Caulk Jr. has represented the 33rd district since 1984. Caulk didn't seek re-election and Democrat Robert Walls won the open seat. Republican primary

Delaware House of Representatives 33rd district Republican primary election, 2006
| Party | Candidate | Votes | % |
|---|---|---|---|
| Republican | Ulysses Grant | 496 | 51.29% |
| Republican | Harold Peterman | 471 | 48.71% |
| Total votes | | 967 | 100% |

General election

Delaware House of Representatives 33rd district general election, 2006
| Party | Candidate | Votes | % |
|---|---|---|---|
| Democratic | Robert Walls | 3,253 | 50.63% |
| Republican | Ulysses Grant | 3,172 | 49.37% |
| Total votes | | 6,425 | 100% |
| Democratic gain from Independent | | | |

=== District 34 ===
Incumbent Republican Gerald Buckworth has represented the 34th district since 1980. Buckworth didn't seek re-election and fellow Republican Donald Blakey won the open seat.

Delaware House of Representatives 34th district general election, 2006
| Party | Candidate | Votes | % |
|---|---|---|---|
| Republican | Donald Blakey | 3,560 | 56.10% |
| Democratic | M. Jeanine Kleimo | 2,786 | 43.90% |
| Total votes | | 6,346 | 100% |
| Republican hold | | | |

=== District 35 ===
Incumbent Republican J. Benjamin Ewing has represented the 35th district since 1986.

Delaware House of Representatives 35th district general election, 2006
| Party | Candidate | Votes | % |
|---|---|---|---|
| Republican | J. Benjamin Ewing (incumbent) | 3,928 | 100% |
| Total votes | | 3,928 | 100% |
| Republican hold | | | |

=== District 36 ===
Incumbent Republican V. George Carey has represented the 36th district since 1984.

Delaware House of Representatives 36th district general election, 2006
| Party | Candidate | Votes | % |
|---|---|---|---|
| Republican | V. George Carey (incumbent) | 4,420 | 62.24% |
| Democratic | Paul Hayes | 2,682 | 37.76% |
| Total votes | | 7,102 | 100% |
| Republican hold | | | |

=== District 37 ===
Incumbent Republican Joseph Booth has represented the th district since 2002.

Delaware House of Representatives 37th district general election, 2006
| Party | Candidate | Votes | % |
|---|---|---|---|
| Republican | Joseph Booth (incumbent) | 5,121 | 100% |
| Total votes | | 5,121 | 100% |
| Republican hold | | | |

=== District 38 ===
Incumbent Republican Gerald Hocker has represented the 38th district since 2002.

Delaware House of Representatives 38th district general election, 2006
| Party | Candidate | Votes | % |
|---|---|---|---|
| Republican | Gerald Hocker (incumbent) | 6,849 | 72.32% |
| Democratic | Robert Maddex | 2,622 | 27.68% |
| Total votes | | 9,471 | 100% |
| Republican hold | | | |

=== District 39 ===
Incumbent Republican Tina Fallon has represented the 39th district since 1978. Fallon didn't seek re-election and fellow Republican Daniel Short won the open seat.

Delaware House of Representatives 39th district general election, 2006
| Party | Candidate | Votes | % |
|---|---|---|---|
| Republican | Daniel Short | 3,370 | 68.59% |
| Democratic | Richard Sternberg | 1,543 | 31.41% |
| Total votes | | 4,913 | 100% |
| Republican hold | | | |

=== District 40 ===
Incumbent Republican Clifford Lee has represented the 40th district since 1990.

Delaware House of Representatives 40th district general election, 2006
| Party | Candidate | Votes | % |
|---|---|---|---|
| Republican | Clifford Lee (incumbent) | 4,254 | 100% |
| Total votes | | 4,254 | 100% |
| Republican hold | | | |

=== District 41 ===
Incumbent Republican John Atkins has represented the 41st district since 2002.

Delaware House of Representatives 41st district general election, 2006
| Party | Candidate | Votes | % |
|---|---|---|---|
| Republican | John Atkins (incumbent) | 4,199 | 62.71% |
| Democratic | Barbara Lifflander (Note: Also nominated by the Independent Party of Delaware.) | 2,497 | 37.29% |
| Total votes | | 6,696 | 100% |
| Republican hold | | | |
