= 2014 Delaware House of Representatives election =

- November 4, 2014

All 41 seats in the Delaware House of Representatives 21 seats needed for a majority
- Turnout: 39%
	Majority party	Minority party
Leader	Peter Schwartzkopf	Daniel Short
Party	Democratic	Republican
Leader's seat	14th - Rehoboth Beach	39th - Seaford
Last election	27	14
Seats before	27	14
Seats won	25	16
Seat change	▼2	▲2
Popular vote	120,397	87,527
Percentage	57.19%	41.58%
Swing	▼5.03%	▲4.75%
- House results by district Democratic hold Republican hold Republican gain
Speaker before election
Peter Schwartzkopf
Democratic
Elected Speaker
Peter Schwartzkopf
Democratic

An election was held on November 4, 2014, to elect all 41 members to Delaware's House of Representatives. The election coincided with the elections for other offices, including U.S. Senate, U.S. House of Representatives, and state senate. The primary election was held on September 9, 2014. Democrats retained control of the House despite losing two seats, winning 25 seats compared to 16 seats for the Republicans.

== Predictions ==
Source	Ranking	As of
Governing	Safe D	October 20, 2014

== Results ==
District	Incumbent	Party	Elected Representative	Party
1st	Charles Potter Jr.	Dem	Charles Potter Jr.	Dem
2nd	Stephanie Bolden	Dem	Stephanie Bolden	Dem
3rd	Helene Keeley	Dem	Helene Keeley	Dem
4th	Gerald Brady	Dem	Gerald Brady	Dem
5th	Melanie George Smith	Dem	Melanie George Smith	Dem
6th	Debra Heffernan	Dem	Debra Heffernan	Dem
7th	Bryon Short	Dem	Bryon Short	Dem
8th	Quinn Johnson	Dem	Quinn Johnson	Dem
9th	Rebecca Walker	Dem	Kevin Hensley	Rep
10th	Dennis Williams	Dem	Sean Matthews	Dem
11th	Jeffrey Spiegelman	Rep	Jeffrey Spiegelman	Rep
12th	Deborah Hudson	Rep	Deborah Hudson	Rep
13th	Larry Mitchell	Dem	Larry Mitchell	Dem
14th	Peter Schwartzkopf	Dem	Peter Schwartzkopf	Dem
15th	Valerie Longhurst	Dem	Valerie Longhurst	Dem
16th	J.J. Johnson	Dem	J.J. Johnson	Dem
17th	Michael Mulrooney	Dem	Michael Mulrooney	Dem
18th	Michael Barbieri	Dem	Michael Barbieri	Dem
19th	Kimberly Williams	Dem	Kimberly Williams	Dem
20th	Stephen Smyk	Rep	Stephen Smyk	Rep
21st	Michael Ramone	Rep	Michael Ramone	Rep
22nd	Joseph Miró	Rep	Joseph Miró	Rep
23rd	Paul Baumbach	Dem	Paul Baumbach	Dem
24th	Edward Osienski	Dem	Edward Osienski	Dem
25th	John Kowalko Jr.	Dem	John Kowalko Jr.	Dem
26th	John Viola	Dem	John Viola	Dem
27th	Earl Jaques Jr.	Dem	Earl Jaques Jr.	Dem
28th	William Carson Jr.	Dem	William Carson Jr.	Dem
29th	Charles Paradee	Dem	Charles Paradee	Dem
30th	William Outten	Rep	William Outten	Rep
31st	Darryl Scott	Dem	Sean Lynn	Dem
32nd	Andria Bennett	Dem	Andria Bennett	Dem
33rd	Harold Peterman	Rep	Harold Peterman	Rep
34th	Donald Blakey	Rep	Lyndon Yearick	Rep
35th	David Wilson	Rep	David Wilson	Rep
36th	Harvey Kenton	Rep	Harvey Kenton	Rep
37th	Ruth Briggs King	Rep	Ruth Briggs King	Rep
38th	Ronald Gray	Rep	Ronald Gray	Rep
39th	Daniel Short	Rep	Daniel Short	Rep
40th	Timothy Dukes	Rep	Timothy Dukes	Rep
41st	John Atkins	Dem	Richard Collins	Rep

=== Statewide ===
Party	Candi- dates	Votes	%	Seats	+/–
Democratic	37	120,397	57.19%	25	▼2
Republican	28	87,527	41.58%	16	▲2
Libertarian	4	1,263	0.60%	0	Steady
Green	1	965	0.46%	0	Steady
Independent	2	369	0.18%	0	Steady
Total	72	210,521	100%	41	Steady

== Detailed Results ==
Results of the 2014 Delaware House of Representatives election by district:

=== District 1 ===
Incumbent Democrat Charles Potter Jr. has represented the 1st district since 2012.

Delaware House of Representatives 1st district general election, 2014
Party	Candidate	Votes	%
Democratic	Charles Potter Jr. (incumbent)	4,691	100%
Total votes		4,691	100%
Democratic hold			

=== District 2 ===
Incumbent Democrat Stephanie Bolden has represented the 2nd district since 2010.

Delaware House of Representatives 2nd district general election, 2014
Party	Candidate	Votes	%
Democratic	Stephanie Bolden (incumbent)	2,393	81.95%
Republican	Richard Leroi Dyton	527	18.05%
Total votes		2,920	100%
Democratic hold			

=== District 3 ===
Incumbent Democrat Helene Keeley has represented the 3rd district and its predecessors since 1996.

Delaware House of Representatives 3rd district general election, 2014
Party	Candidate	Votes	%
Democratic	Helene Keeley (incumbent)	2,477	82.93%
Republican	Robert Bovell	510	17.07%
Total votes		2,987	100%
Democratic hold			

=== District 4 ===
Incumbent Democrat Gerald Brady has represented the 4th district since 2006.

Delaware House of Representatives 4th district general election, 2014
Party	Candidate	Votes	%
Democratic	Gerald Brady (incumbent)	4,356	59.71%
Republican	Robert Kessler	2,939	40.29%
Total votes		7,295	100%
Democratic hold			

=== District 5 ===
Incumbent Democrat Melanie George Smith has represented the 5th district since 2002.

Delaware House of Representatives 5th district general election, 2014
Party	Candidate	Votes	%
Democratic	Melanie George Smith (incumbent)	3,826	100%
Total votes		3,826	100%
Democratic hold			

=== District 6 ===
Incumbent Democrat Debra Heffernan has represented the 6th district since 2010.

Delaware House of Representatives 6th district general election, 2014
Party	Candidate	Votes	%
Democratic	Debra Heffernan (incumbent)	4,620	63.44%
Republican	Kyle Buzzard	2,662	36.56%
Total votes		7,282	100%
Democratic hold			

=== District 7 ===
Incumbent Democrat Bryon Short has represented the 7th district since 2006.

Delaware House of Representatives 7th district general election, 2014
Party	Candidate	Votes	%
Democratic	Bryon Short (incumbent)	4,392	86.13%
Libertarian	C. Robert Wilson	707	13.87%
Total votes		5,099	100%
Democratic hold			

=== District 8 ===
Incumbent Democrat Quinn Johnson has represented the 8th district since 2008.

Delaware House of Representatives 8th district general election, 2014
Party	Candidate	Votes	%
Democratic	Quinn Johnson (incumbent)	3,562	61.43%
Republican	Matthew Brown	2,236	38.57%
Total votes		5,798	100%
Democratic hold			

=== District 9 ===
Incumbent Democrat Rebecca Walker has represented the 9th district since 2010. Walker didn't seek re-election. Republican Kevin Hensley won the open seat.

Delaware House of Representatives 9th district general election, 2014
Party	Candidate	Votes	%
Republican	Kevin Hensley	3,290	51.47%
Democratic	Jason Horitz	2,950	46.15%
Independent Party	Douglas Campbell Jr.	152	2.38%
Total votes		6,392	100%
Republican gain from Democratic			

=== District 10 ===
Incumbent Democrat Dennis Williams has represented the 10th district since 2008. Williams lost re-nomination to fellow Democrat Sean Matthews, who went on to win the general election. Democratic primary

Delaware House of Representatives 10th district Democratic primary election, 2014
Party	Candidate	Votes	%
Democratic	Sean Matthews	694	54.99%
Democratic	Dennis Williams (incumbent)	568	45.01%
Total votes		1,262	100%

General election

Delaware House of Representatives 10th district general election, 2014
Party	Candidate	Votes	%
Democratic	Sean Matthews	3,494	55.16%
Republican	Judith Travis	2,840	44.84%
Total votes		6,334	100%
Democratic hold			

=== District 11 ===
Incumbent Republican Jeffrey Spiegelman has represented the 11th district since 2012.

Delaware House of Representatives 11th district general election, 2014
Party	Candidate	Votes	%
Republican	Jeffrey Spiegelman (incumbent)	3,347	63.27%
Democratic	Lynne Newlin	1,943	36.73%
Total votes		5,290	100%
Republican hold			

=== District 12 ===
Incumbent Republican Deborah Hudson has represented the 12th district since 1994.

Delaware House of Representatives 12th district general election, 2014
Party	Candidate	Votes	%
Republican	Deborah Hudson (incumbent)	5,726	65.26%
Democratic	Jeffrey Porter	3,048	34.74%
Total votes		8,774	100%
Republican hold			

=== District 13 ===
Incumbent Democrat Larry Mitchell has represented the 13th district since 2006.

Delaware House of Representatives 13th district general election, 2014
Party	Candidate	Votes	%
Democratic	Larry Mitchell (incumbent)	3,258	100%
Total votes		3,258	100%
Democratic hold			

=== District 14 ===
Incumbent Democratic House Speaker Peter Schwartzkopf has represented the 14th district since 2002.

Delaware House of Representatives 14th district general election, 2014
Party	Candidate	Votes	%
Democratic	Peter Schwartzkopf (incumbent)	5,911	100%
Total votes		5,911	100%
Democratic hold			

=== District 15 ===
Incumbent Democrat Valerie Longhurst has represented the 15th district since 2004. Democratic primary

Delaware House of Representatives 15th district Democratic primary election, 2014
Party	Candidate	Votes	%
Democratic	Valerie Longhurst (incumbent)	626	64.34%
Democratic	James Burton	347	35.66%
Total votes		973	100%

General election

Delaware House of Representatives 15th district general election, 2014
Party	Candidate	Votes	%
Democratic	Valerie Longhurst (incumbent)	3,906	68.12%
Republican	Matthew Lenzini	1,828	31.88%
Total votes		5,734	100%
Democratic hold			

=== District 16 ===
Incumbent Democrat J.J. Johnson has represented the 16th district since 2004.

Delaware House of Representatives 16th district general election, 2014
Party	Candidate	Votes	%
Democratic	J.J. Johnson (incumbent)	3,802	82.53%
Republican	Gregory Coverdale	805	17.47%
Total votes		4,607	100%
Democratic hold			

=== District 17 ===
Incumbent Democrat Michael Mulrooney has represented the th district since 1998.

Delaware House of Representatives 17th district general election, 2014
Party	Candidate	Votes	%
Democratic	Michael Mulrooney (incumbent)	3,860	100%
Total votes		3,860	100%
Democratic hold			

=== District 18 ===
Incumbent Democrat Michael Barbieri has represented the 18th district since 2008. Democratic primary

Delaware House of Representatives 18th district Democratic primary election, 2014
Party	Candidate	Votes	%
Democratic	Michael Barbieri (incumbent)	577	82.43%
Democratic	Christopher Piecuch	123	17.57%
Total votes		700	100%

General election

Delaware House of Representatives 18th district general election, 2014
Party	Candidate	Votes	%
Democratic	Michael Barbieri (incumbent)	3,329	100%
Total votes		3,329	100%
Democratic hold			

=== District 19 ===
Incumbent Democrat Kimberly Williams has represented the 19th district since 2012. Democratic primary

Delaware House of Representatives 19th district Democratic primary election, 2014
Party	Candidate	Votes	%
Democratic	Kimberly Williams (incumbent)	563	67.02%
Democratic	William Dunn	277	32.98%
Total votes		840	100%

General election

Delaware House of Representatives 19th district general election, 2014
Party	Candidate	Votes	%
Democratic	Kimberly Williams (incumbent)	3,128	63.63%
Republican	James Startzman	1,788	36.37%
Total votes		4,916	100%
Democratic hold			

=== District 20 ===
Incumbent Republican Stephen Smyk has represented the 20th district since 2012.

Delaware House of Representatives 20th district general election, 2014
Party	Candidate	Votes	%
Republican	Stephen Smyk (incumbent)	5,473	58.06%
Democratic	M. Marie Mayor	3,737	39.64%
Independent Party	Donald Ayotte	217	2.30%
Total votes		9,427	100%
Republican hold			

=== District 21 ===
Incumbent Republican Michael Ramone has represented the 21st district since 2008.

Delaware House of Representatives 21st district general election, 2014
Party	Candidate	Votes	%
Republican	Michael Ramone (incumbent)	4,048	80.75%
Green	David McCorquodale	965	19.25%
Total votes		5,013	100%
Republican hold			

=== District 22 ===
Incumbent Republican Joseph Miró has represented the 22nd district since 1998. Republican primary

Delaware House of Representatives 22nd district Republican primary election, 2014
Party	Candidate	Votes	%
Republican	Joseph Miró (incumbent)	797	56.89%
Republican	Michael Smith	604	43.11%
Total votes		1,401	100%

General election

Delaware House of Representatives 22nd district general election, 2014
Party	Candidate	Votes	%
Republican	Joseph Miró (incumbent)	5,118	63.28%
Democratic	John Mackenzie	2,784	34.42%
Libertarian	Steven Newton	186	2.30%
Total votes		8,088	100%
Republican hold			

=== District 23 ===
Incumbent Democrat Paul Baumbach has represented the 23rd district since 2012.

Delaware House of Representatives 23rd district general election, 2014
Party	Candidate	Votes	%
Democratic	Paul Baumbach (incumbent)	3,740	100%
Total votes		3,740	100%
Democratic hold			

=== District 24 ===
Incumbent Democrat Edward Osienski has represented the 24th district since 2010.

Delaware House of Representatives 24th district general election, 2014
Party	Candidate	Votes	%
Democratic	Edward Osienski (incumbent)	3,194	100%
Total votes		3,194	100%
Democratic hold			

=== District 25 ===
Incumbent Democrat John Kowalko Jr. has represented the 25th district since 2006.

Delaware House of Representatives 25th district general election, 2014
Party	Candidate	Votes	%
Democratic	John Kowalko Jr. (incumbent)	3,098	100%
Total votes		3,098	100%
Democratic hold			

=== District 26 ===
Incumbent Democrat John Viola has represented the 26th district since 1998.

Delaware House of Representatives 26th district general election, 2014
Party	Candidate	Votes	%
Democratic	John Viola (incumbent)	3,329	100%
Total votes		3,329	100%
Democratic hold			

=== District 27 ===
Incumbent Democrat Earl Jaques Jr. has represented the 27th district since 2008.

Delaware House of Representatives 27th district general election, 2014
Party	Candidate	Votes	%
Democratic	Earl Jaques Jr. (incumbent)	4,642	100%
Total votes		4,642	100%
Democratic hold			

=== District 28 ===
Incumbent Democrat William Carson Jr. has represented the 28th district since 2008.

Delaware House of Representatives 28th district general election, 2014
Party	Candidate	Votes	%
Democratic	William Carson Jr. (incumbent)	3,490	100%
Total votes		3,490	100%
Democratic hold			

=== District 29 ===
Incumbent Democrat Charles Paradee has represented the 29th district since 2012.

Delaware House of Representatives 29th district general election, 2014
Party	Candidate	Votes	%
Democratic	Charles Paradee (incumbent)	3,332	57.42%
Republican	Peter Kramer	2,471	42.58%
Total votes		5,803	100%
Democratic hold			

=== District 30 ===
Incumbent Republican William Outten has represented the 30th district since 2004.

Delaware House of Representatives 30th district general election, 2014
Party	Candidate	Votes	%
Republican	William Outten (incumbent)	3,489	65.68%
Democratic	Jonathan Gallo	1,758	33.09%
Libertarian	Gordon Smith	65	1.22%
Total votes		5,312	100%
Republican hold			

=== District 31 ===
Incumbent Democrat Darryl Scott has represented the 31st district since 2008. Scott didn't seek re-election and fellow Democrat Sean Lynn won the open seat. Democratic primary

Delaware House of Representatives 31st district Democratic primary election, 2014
Party	Candidate	Votes	%
Democratic	Sean Lynn	482	60.71%
Democratic	Ralph Leroy Taylor Jr.	312	39.29%
Total votes		794	100%

General election

Delaware House of Representatives 31st district general election, 2014
Party	Candidate	Votes	%
Democratic	Sean Lynn	2,609	53.30%
Republican	Samuel Chick	2,286	46.70%
Total votes		4,895	100%
Democratic hold			

=== District 32 ===
Incumbent Democrat Andria Bennett has represented the 32nd district since 2012.

Delaware House of Representatives 32nd district general election, 2014
Party	Candidate	Votes	%
Democratic	Andria Bennett (incumbent)	1,860	57.57%
Republican	William McVay	1,371	42.43%
Total votes		3,231	100%
Democratic hold			

=== District 33 ===
Incumbent Republican Harold Peterman has represented the 33rd district since 2010. Republican primary

Delaware House of Representatives 33rd district Republican primary election, 2014
Party	Candidate	Votes	%
Republican	Harold Peterman (incumbent)	657	64.47%
Republican	Charles Postles Jr.	362	35.53%
Total votes		1,019	100%

General election

Delaware House of Representatives 33rd district general election, 2014
Party	Candidate	Votes	%
Republican	Harold Peterman (incumbent)	3,336	57.87%
Democratic	John Kevin Robbins	2,429	42.13%
Total votes		5,765	100%
Republican hold			

=== District 34 ===
Incumbent Republican Donald Blakey has represented the 34th district since 2006. Blakey lost re-nomination to fellow Republican Lyndon Yearick, who went on to win the general election. Republican primary

Delaware House of Representatives 34th district Republican primary election, 2014
Party	Candidate	Votes	%
Republican	Lyndon Yearick	645	58.16%
Republican	Donald Blakey (incumbent)	464	41.84%
Total votes		1,109	100%

General election

Delaware House of Representatives 34th district general election, 2014
Party	Candidate	Votes	%
Republican	Lyndon Yearick	4,097	64.37%
Democratic	Theodore Yacucci	2,268	35.63%
Total votes		6,365	100%
Republican hold			

=== District 35 ===
Incumbent Republican David Wilson has represented the 35th district since 2008.

Delaware House of Representatives 35th district general election, 2014
Party	Candidate	Votes	%
Republican	David Wilson (incumbent)	4,155	100%
Total votes		4,155	100%
Republican hold			

=== District 36 ===
Incumbent Republican Harvey Kenton has represented the 36th district since 2010.

Delaware House of Representatives 36th district general election, 2014
Party	Candidate	Votes	%
Republican	Harvey Kenton (incumbent)	4,455	100%
Total votes		4,455	100%
Republican hold			

=== District 37 ===
Incumbent Republican Ruth Briggs King has represented the th district since 2009.

Delaware House of Representatives 37th district general election, 2014
Party	Candidate	Votes	%
Republican	Ruth Briggs King (incumbent)	4,173	65.34%
Democratic	Paulette Ann Rappa	2,214	34.66%
Total votes		6,387	100%
Republican hold			

=== District 38 ===
Incumbent Republican Ronald Gray has represented the 38th district since 2012.

Delaware House of Representatives 38th district general election, 2014
Party	Candidate	Votes	%
Republican	Ronald Gray (incumbent)	7,133	100%
Total votes		7,133	100%
Republican hold			

=== District 39 ===
Incumbent Republican Daniel Short has represented the 39th district since 2006.

Delaware House of Representatives 39th district general election, 2014
Party	Candidate	Votes	%
Republican	Daniel Short (incumbent)	3,977	92.88%
Libertarian	James Brittingham	305	7.12%
Total votes		4,282	100%
Republican hold			

=== District 40 ===
Incumbent Republican Timothy Dukes has represented the 40th district since 2012.

Delaware House of Representatives 40th district general election, 2014
Party	Candidate	Votes	%
Republican	Timothy Dukes (incumbent)	4,306	100%
Total votes		4,306	100%
Republican hold			

=== District 41 ===
Incumbent Democrat John Atkins has represented the 41st district since 2008. Atkins lost re-election to Republican Richard Collins.

Delaware House of Representatives 41st district general election, 2014
Party	Candidate	Votes	%
Republican	Richard Collins	3,189	52.21%
Democratic	John Atkins (incumbent)	2,919	47.79%
Total votes		6,108	100%
Republican gain from Democratic			
