= 2008 Delaware Senate election =

- November 4, 2008

10 of the 21 seats in the Delaware Senate 11 seats needed for a majority

	Majority party	Minority party
Leader	Thurman Adams Jr.	Charlie Copeland (retired)
Party	Democratic	Republican
Leader since	January 2003	January 2007
Leader's seat	19th - Bridgeville	4th - Brandywine
Last election	13	8
Seats before	13	8
Seats won	7	3
Seats after	16	5
Seat change	▲3	▼3
Popular vote	110,909	59,428
Percentage	65.11%	34.89%
- Results: Democratic gain Democratic hold Republican hold No election
President pro tempore before election
Thurman Adams Jr.
Democratic
Elected President pro tempore
Tony DeLuca
Democratic

The 2008 Delaware Senate election was held on November 4, 2008, to elect 10 of the 21 members to Delaware's Senate. The election coincided with elections for other offices, including for U.S. President, U.S. Senate, U.S. House of Representatives, Governor, Lieutenant Governor, and state house. The primary election was held on September 9, 2008.

== Results summary ==
District	Incumbent	Party	Elected Senator	Party
2	Margaret Rose Henry	Dem	Margaret Rose Henry	Dem
3	Robert Marshall	Dem	Robert Marshall	Dem
4	Charlie Copeland	Rep	Michael Katz	Dem
6	Liane Sorenson	Rep	Liane Sorenson	Rep
10	Steven Amick	Rep	Bethany Hall-Long	Dem
11	Tony DeLuca	Dem	Tony DeLuca	Dem
16	Colin Bonini	Rep	Colin Bonini	Rep
17	John Still III	Rep	Brian Bushweller	Dem
18	Gary Simpson	Rep	Gary Simpson	Rep
21	Robert Venables Sr.	Dem	Robert Venables Sr.	Dem

Party	Candi- dates	Votes		Seats		
Party	Candi- dates	No.	%	No.	+/–	%
Democratic	10	110,909	65.11%	16	▲3	76.19%
Republican	6	59,428	34.89%	5	▼3	23.81%
Total	16	170,337	100%	21	Steady	100%

Popular vote
Democratic	65.11%
Republican	34.89%

Senate seats
Democratic	76.19%
Republican	23.81%

== Predictions ==
Source	Ranking	As of
Stateline	Safe D	October 15, 2008

== Detailed results ==
=== District 2 ===
Incumbent Democrat Majority Leader Margaret Rose Henry has represented the 2nd district since 1994.

Delaware Senate 2nd district general election, 2008
Party	Candidate	Votes	%
Democratic	Margaret Rose Henry (incumbent)	11,872	100%
Total votes		11,872	100%
Democratic hold			

=== District 3 ===
Incumbent Democrat Robert Marshall has represented the 3rd district since 1979.

Delaware Senate 3rd district general election, 2008
Party	Candidate	Votes	%
Democratic	Robert Marshall (incumbent)	10,225	100%
Total votes		10,225	100%
Democratic hold			

=== District 4 ===
Incumbent Republican Minority Leader Charlie Copeland has represented the 4th district since 2003. Copeland retired to run for Lieutenant Governor. Democrat Michael Katz won the open seat. Democratic primary

Delaware Senate 4th district Democratic primary election, 2008
Party	Candidate	Votes	%
Democratic	Michael Katz	2,428	63.00%
Democratic	Dee Durham	1,426	37.00%
Total votes		3,854	100%

Republican primary

Delaware Senate 4th district Republican primary election, 2008
Party	Candidate	Votes	%
Republican	John Clatworthy	1,822	47.77%
Republican	Michael Fleming	1,366	35.82%
Republican	Richard Abbott	626	16.41%
Total votes		3,814	100%

General election

Delaware Senate 4th district general election, 2008
Party	Candidate	Votes	%
Democratic	Michael Katz	11,296	50.65%
Republican	John Clatworthy	11,004	49.35%
Total votes		22,300	100%
Democratic gain from Republican			

=== District 6 ===
Incumbent Republican Liane Sorenson has represented the 6th district since 1995. Democratic primary

Delaware Senate 6th district Democratic primary election, 2008
Party	Candidate	Votes	%
Democratic	John Mackenzie	1,347	51.24%
Democratic	Michael Terranova	1,282	48.76%
Total votes		2,629	100%

General election

Delaware Senate 6th district general election, 2008
Party	Candidate	Votes	%
Republican	Liane Sorenson (incumbent)	7,195	51.30%
Democratic	John Mackenzie	6,831	48.70%
Total votes		14,026	100%
Republican hold			

=== District 10 ===
Incumbent Republican Steven Amick has represented the 10th district since 1995. Amick didn't seek re-election and Democrat Bethany Hall-Long won the open seat.

Republican primary

Delaware Senate 10th district Republican primary election, 2008
Party	Candidate	Votes	%
Republican	James Weldin	802	65.74%
Republican	Andrea Daley	418	34.26%
Total votes		1,220	100%

General election

Delaware Senate 10th district general election, 2008
Party	Candidate	Votes	%
Democratic	Bethany Hall-Long	13,965	64.90%
Republican	James Weldin	7,554	35.10%
Total votes		21,519	100%
Democratic gain from Republican			

=== District 11 ===
Incumbent Democrat Tony DeLuca has represented the 11th district since 1999.

Delaware Senate 11th district general election, 2008
Party	Candidate	Votes	%
Democratic	Tony DeLuca (incumbent)	13,318	100%
Total votes		13,318	100%
Democratic hold			

=== District 16 ===
Incumbent Republican Colin Bonini has represented the 16th district since 1995.

Delaware Senate 16th district general election, 2008
Party	Candidate	Votes	%
Republican	Colin Bonini (incumbent)	11,156	56.39%
Democratic	Harold Stafford	8,629	43.61%
Total votes		19,785	100%
Republican hold			

=== District 17 ===
Incumbent Republican John Still III has represented the 17th district since 1988. Still didn't seek re-election and Democrat Brian Bushweller won the open seat.

Delaware Senate 17th district general election, 2008
Party	Candidate	Votes	%
Democratic	Brian Bushweller	10,279	56.47%
Republican	James Hutchinson	7,923	43.53%
Total votes		18,202	100%
Democratic gain from Republican			

=== District 18 ===
Incumbent Republican Gary Simpson has represented the 18th district since 1999.

Delaware Senate 18th district general election, 2008
Party	Candidate	Votes	%
Republican	Gary Simpson (incumbent)	14,596	55.11%
Democratic	Gary Downes	11,891	44.89%
Total votes		26,487	100%
Republican hold			

=== District 21 ===
Incumbent Democrat Robert Venables Sr. has represented the 21st district since 1989.

Delaware Senate 21st district general election, 2008
Party	Candidate	Votes	%
Democratic	Robert Venables Sr. (incumbent)	12,603	100%
Total votes		12,603	100%
Democratic hold			
