= 2014 Delaware Senate election =

- November 4, 2014

10 of the 21 seats in the Delaware Senate 11 seats needed for a majority
- Turnout: 36%

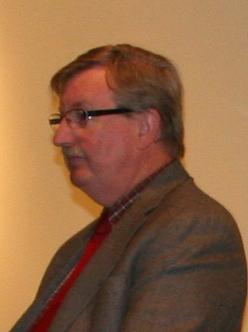
	Majority party	Minority party
Leader	Patti Blevins	Gary Simpson
Party	Democratic	Republican
Leader since	January 8, 2013	January 8, 2009
Leader's seat	7th – Elsmere	18th – Milford
Last election	13	8
Seats before	13	8
Seats won	5	5
Seats after	12	9
Seat change	▼1	▲1
Popular vote	51,675	50,711
Percentage	49.39%	48.47%
- Results: Republican gain Democratic hold Republican hold No election
President pro tempore before election
Patti Blevins
Democratic
Elected President pro tempore
Patti Blevins
Democratic

The 2014 Delaware Senate election was held on November 4, 2014 to elect 10 of the 21 members to Delaware's Senate. The election coincided with the elections for other offices, including the U.S. Senate, U.S. House of Representatives, and state house. The primary election was held on September 9, 2014.

Delaware Republicans needed to have a net gain of 3 seats to flip the chamber from the Democrats, however, they gained only 1 seat (winning 9 seats compared to 12 seats for the Democrats).

== Predictions ==
Source	Ranking	As of
Governing	Safe D	October 20, 2014

== Results summary ==
District	Incumbent	Party	Elected Senator	Party
2	Margaret Rose Henry	Dem	Margaret Rose Henry	Dem
3	Robert Marshall	Dem	Robert Marshall	Dem
4	Gregory Lavelle	Rep	Gregory Lavelle	Rep
6	Ernesto Lopez	Rep	Ernesto Lopez	Rep
10	Bethany Hall-Long	Dem	Bethany Hall-Long	Dem
11	Bryan Townsend	Dem	Bryan Townsend	Dem
16	Colin Bonini	Rep	Colin Bonini	Rep
17	Brian Bushweller	Dem	Brian Bushweller	Dem
18	Gary Simpson	Rep	Gary Simpson	Rep
21	Robert Venables Sr.	Dem	Bryant Richardson	Rep

Party	Candi- dates	Votes		Seats		
Party	Candi- dates	No.	%	No.	+/–	%
Democratic	9	51,675	49.39%	12	▼1	57.14%
Republican	8	50,711	48.47%	9	▲1	42.86%
Independent	1	2,135	2.04%	0	Steady	0.00%
Libertarian	1	113	0.11%	0	Steady	0.00%
Total	19	104,634	100%	21	Steady	100%

Popular vote
Democratic	49.39%
Republican	48.47%
Independent	2.04%
Libertarian	0.11%

Senate seats
Democratic	57.14%
Republican	42.86%

== Detailed results ==
=== District 2 ===
Incumbent Democrat Majority Leader Margaret Rose Henry has represented the 2nd district since 1994.

Delaware Senate 2nd district general election, 2014
Party	Candidate	Votes	%
Democratic	Margaret Rose Henry (incumbent)	7,324	87.88%
Republican	Robert F. Martin	1,010	12.12%
Total votes		8,334	100%
Democratic hold			

=== District 3 ===
Incumbent Democrat Robert Marshall has represented the 3rd district since 1979.

Delaware Senate 3rd district Democratic primary election, 2014
Party	Candidate	Votes	%
Democratic	Robert Marshall (incumbent)	945	51.00%
Democratic	Sherry Dorsey Walker	908	49.00%
Total votes		1,853	100%

Delaware Senate 3rd district general election, 2014
Party	Candidate	Votes	%
Democratic	Robert Marshall (incumbent)	5,214	100%
Total votes		5,214	100%
Democratic hold			

=== District 4 ===
Incumbent Republican Gregory Lavelle has represented the 4th district since 2013.

Delaware Senate 4th district general election, 2014
Party	Candidate	Votes	%
Republican	Gregory Lavelle (incumbent)	8,983	61.93%
Democratic	Sarah L. Buttner	5,521	38.07%
Total votes		14,504	100%
Republican hold			

=== District 6 ===
Incumbent Republican Ernesto Lopez has represented the 6th district since 2013.

Delaware Senate 6th district general election, 2014
Party	Candidate	Votes	%
Republican	Ernesto Lopez (incumbent)	11,633	63.39%
Democratic	R. Claire Snyder-Hall	6,718	36.61%
Total votes		18,351	100%
Republican hold			

=== District 10 ===
Incumbent Democrat Bethany Hall-Long has represented the 10th district since 2009.

Delaware Senate 10th district general election, 2014
Party	Candidate	Votes	%
Democratic	Bethany Hall-Long (incumbent)	6,230	51.09%
Republican	John Marino	5,963	48.91%
Total votes		12,193	100%
Democratic hold			

=== District 11 ===
Incumbent Democrat Bryan Townsend has represented the 11th district since 2013.

Delaware Senate 11th district Democratic primary election, 2014
Party	Candidate	Votes	%
Democratic	Bryan Townsend (incumbent)	1,253	78.07%
Democratic	David L. Tackett	352	21.93%
Total votes		1,605	100%

Delaware Senate 11th district general election, 2014
Party	Candidate	Votes	%
Democratic	Bryan Townsend (incumbent)	6,426	100%
Total votes		6,426	100%
Democratic hold			

=== District 16 ===
Incumbent Republican Colin Bonini has represented the 16th district since 1995.

Delaware Senate 16th district general election, 2014
Party	Candidate	Votes	%
Republican	Colin Bonini (incumbent)	6,178	74.32%
Independent Party	Michael S. Tedesco	2,135	25.68%
Total votes		8,313	100%
Republican hold			

=== District 17 ===
Incumbent Democrat Brian Bushweller has represented the 17th district since 2009.

Delaware Senate 17th district general election, 2014
Party	Candidate	Votes	%
Democratic	Brian Bushweller (incumbent)	5,811	59.96%
Republican	Kim E. Warfield	3,881	40.04%
Total votes		9,692	100%
Democratic hold			

=== District 18 ===
Incumbent Republican Minority Leader Gary Simpson has represented the 18th district since 1999.

Delaware Senate 18h district Democratic primary election, 2014
Party	Candidate	Votes	%
Democratic	Patrick J. Emory	654	65.40%
Democratic	Gary M. Wolfe	346	34.60%
Total votes		1,000	100%

Delaware Senate 18th district general election, 2014
Party	Candidate	Votes	%
Republican	Gary Simpson (incumbent)	7,853	66.72%
Democratic	Patrick J. Emory	3,917	33.28%
Total votes		11,770	100%
Republican hold			

=== District 21 ===
Incumbent Democrat Robert Venables Sr. has represented the 21st district since 1989. He lost re-election to Republican Bryant Richardson.

Delaware Senate 21st district general election, 2014
Party	Candidate	Votes	%
Republican	Bryant Richardson	5,210	52.96%
Democratic	Robert Venables Sr. (incumbent)	4,514	45.89%
Libertarian	John F. Potter	113	1.15%
Total votes		9,837	100%
Republican gain from Democratic			
