= 2006 Delaware Senate election =

- November 7, 2006

11 of the 21 seats in the Delaware Senate 11 seats needed for a majority

	Majority party	Minority party
Leader	Thurman Adams Jr.	John Still III
Party	Democratic	Republican
Leader since	January 2003	January 2003
Leader's seat	19th - Bridgeville	17th - Dover
Last election	13	8
Seats before	13	8
Seats won	9	2
Seats after	13	8
Seat change	Steady	Steady
Popular vote	82,908	32,614
Percentage	69.52%	27.35%
- Results: Democratic hold Republican hold No election
President pro tempore before election
Thurman Adams Jr.
Democratic
Elected President pro tempore
Thurman Adams Jr.
Democratic

The 2006 Delaware Senate election was held on November 7, 2006, to elect 11 of the 21 members to Delaware's Senate. The election coincided with elections for other offices, including for U.S. Senate, U.S. House of Representatives, and state house. The primary election was held on September 12, 2006.

== Results summary ==
District	Incumbent	Party	Elected Senator	Party
1	Harris McDowell III	Dem	Harris McDowell III	Dem
5	Catherine Cloutier	Rep	Catherine Cloutier	Rep
7	Patti Blevins	Dem	Patti Blevins	Dem
8	David Sokola	Dem	David Sokola	Dem
9	Karen Peterson	Dem	Karen Peterson	Dem
12	Dorinda Connor	Rep	Dorinda Connor	Rep
13	David McBride	Dem	David McBride	Dem
14	James Vaughn	Dem	James Vaughn	Dem
15	Nancy W. Cook	Dem	Nancy W. Cook	Dem
19	Thurman Adams Jr.	Dem	Thurman Adams Jr.	Dem
20	George Bunting	Dem	George Bunting	Dem

Party	Candi- dates	Votes		Seats		
Party	Candi- dates	No.	%	No.	+/–	%
Democratic	10	82,908	69.52%	13	Steady	61.90%
Republican	6	32,614	27.35%	8	Steady	38.10%
Independent	3	3,733	3.13%	0	Steady	0.00%
Total	19	119,255	100%	21	Steady	100%

Popular vote
Democratic	69.52%
Republican	27.35%
Independent	3.13%

Senate seats
Democratic	61.90%
Republican	38.10%

== Predictions ==
Source	Ranking	As of
Rothenberg	Safe D	November 4, 2006

== Detailed results ==
Results of the 2006 Delaware Senate election by district:

=== District 1 ===
Incumbent Democrat Harris McDowell III has represented the 1st district since 1977. Democratic primary

Delaware Senate 1st district Democratic primary election, 2006
Party	Candidate	Votes	%
Democratic	Harris McDowell III (incumbent)	1,477	49.50%
Democratic	Charles Potter Jr.	944	31.64%
Democratic	Thornton Carroll	330	11.06%
Democratic	Lester Hendrix	233	7.81%
Total votes		2,984	100%

Republican primary

Delaware Senate 1st district Republican primary election, 2006
Party	Candidate	Votes	%
Republican	Gregory Chambers	467	68.08%
Republican	Tyler Patrick Nixon	219	31.92%
Total votes		686	100%

General election

Delaware Senate 1st district general election, 2006
Party	Candidate	Votes	%
Democratic	Harris McDowell III (incumbent)	8,300	64.59%
Republican	Gregory Chambers	3,752	29.20%
Independent Party	Tyler Patrick Nixon	799	6.22%
Total votes		12,851	100%
Democratic hold			

=== District 5 ===
Incumbent Republican Catherine Cloutier has represented the 5th district since 2001.

Delaware Senate 5th district general election, 2006
Party	Candidate	Votes	%
Republican	Catherine Cloutier (incumbent)	6,945	52.60%
Democratic	Patricia Morrison	6,259	47.40%
Total votes		13,204	100%
Republican hold			

=== District 7 ===
Incumbent Democrat Patti Blevins has represented the 7th district since 1991.

Delaware Senate 7th district general election, 2006
Party	Candidate	Votes	%
Democratic	Patti Blevins (incumbent)	8,835	72.29%
Republican	Everson Bullen Jr.	3,386	27.71%
Total votes		12,221	100%
Democratic hold			

=== District 8 ===
Incumbent Democrat David Sokola has represented the 8th district since 1991.

Delaware Senate 8th district general election, 2006
Party	Candidate	Votes	%
Democratic	David Sokola (incumbent)	7,678	57.79%
Republican	Michael Ramone	5,608	42.21%
Total votes		13,286	100%
Democratic hold			

=== District 9 ===
Incumbent Democrat Karen Peterson has represented the 9th district since 2003.

Delaware Senate 9th district general election, 2006
Party	Candidate	Votes	%
Democratic	Karen Peterson (incumbent)	8,352	100%
Total votes		8,352	100%
Democratic hold			

=== District 12 ===
Incumbent Republican Dorinda Connor has represented the 12th district since 1997.

Delaware Senate 12th district general election, 2006
Party	Candidate	Votes	%
Republican	Dorinda Connor (incumbent)	8,040	100%
Total votes		8,040	100%
Republican hold			

=== District 13 ===
Incumbent Democrat David McBride has represented the 13th district since 1979.

Delaware Senate 13th district general election, 2006
Party	Candidate	Votes	%
Democratic	David McBride (incumbent)	7,152	100%
Total votes		7,152	100%
Democratic hold			

=== District 14 ===
Incumbent Democrat James Vaughn has represented the 14th district since 1980. Republican primary

Delaware Senate 14th district Republican primary election, 2006
Party	Candidate	Votes	%
Republican	John Feroce	362	52.16%
Republican	Barbara Allsopp	332	47.84%
Total votes		694	100%

General election

Delaware Senate 14th district general election, 2006
Party	Candidate	Votes	%
Democratic	James Vaughn (incumbent)	8,388	59.12%
Republican	John Feroce	4,883	34.41%
Independent Party	Barbara Allsopp	918	6.47%
Total votes		14,189	100%
Democratic hold			

=== District 15 ===
Incumbent Democrat Nancy Cook has represented the 15th district since 1975.

Delaware Senate 15th district general election, 2006
Party	Candidate	Votes	%
Democratic	Nancy Cook (incumbent)	8,706	100%
Total votes		8,706	100%
Democratic hold			

=== District 19 ===
Incumbent Democrat and President pro tempore Thurman Adams Jr. has represented the 19th district since 1973.

Delaware Senate 19th district general election, 2006
Party	Candidate	Votes	%
Democratic	Thurman Adams Jr. (incumbent)	7,278	78.31%
Independent Party	Matthew Opaliski	2,016	21.69%
Total votes		9,294	100%
Democratic hold			

=== District 20 ===
Incumbent Democrat George Bunting has represented the 20th district since 1997.

Delaware Senate 20th district general election, 2006
Party	Candidate	Votes	%
Democratic	George Bunting (incumbent)	11,960	100%
Total votes		11,960	100%
Democratic hold			
