= Senator LaValle =

Senator LaValle may refer to:

- Gerald LaValle (1932–2018), Pennsylvania State Senate
- Kenneth LaValle (born 1939), New York State Senate

== See also ==
- Gregory Lavelle (born 1963), Delaware State Senate
