= Jane Maroney =

American politician (1923–2021)

Jane Perkins Maroney (July 29, 1923 – December 28, 2021) was an American politician who was a member of the Delaware General Assembly, representing House District 10 in the Delaware House of Representatives as a member of the Republican Party. She was noted for her use of both legislative and personal time to advance legislation on child care. She also spent time on HIV/AIDS prevention and unwanted pregnancies.

On July 9, 1923, Jane Perkins was born in Boston, Massachusetts, to parents Mary (Boland) Perkins and John Perkins. She was one of four children. Perkins attended the Gibbs College until 1942, after which she graduated from Radcliffe College in 1944. She worked for the Central Intelligence Agency from 1951 to 1956. In 1972, she was a volunteer for a US Senate election campaign.

== Politics ==
Maroney's experience, both political and non-political, before running for a state representative seat was listed as "five years in business, five years in government in Washington and Europe, head of management training and research in Delaware civic and philanthropic organizations." She was elected to the Delaware House of Representatives to represent district 10 in 1979 and served until 1998. Initially, her political concerns were revising Delaware's tax base away from an above-average reliance on income taxes, and increasing the rate of use of the House committee system. For the 1990 election, she listed healthcare, land use, and education as her three primary concerns. During her 1994 re-election against Dennis E. Williams, she won 71% to 29%.

== Personal life ==
on July 7, 1956, she married Dr. John Maroney, in Washington, D.C., and moved to Wilmington, Delaware. She died there on December 28, 2021, at the age of 98.

== Honors ==
In 1993, the University of Delaware awarded her its Medal of Merit, which was consolidated with the university's Medal of Distinction in 1995.

Maroney is a member of the Hall of Fame of Delaware Women and was inducted in 1996.

Delaware House of Representatives
Preceded by C. Leslie Ridings	Member of the Delaware House of Representatives from the 12th district 1979–1983	Succeeded by Philip J. Corrozi
Preceded by Gwynne P. Smith	Member of the Delaware House of Representatives from the 10th district 1983–1999	Succeeded by Robert J. Valihura Jr.
