= Brian G. Pettyjohn =

American politician

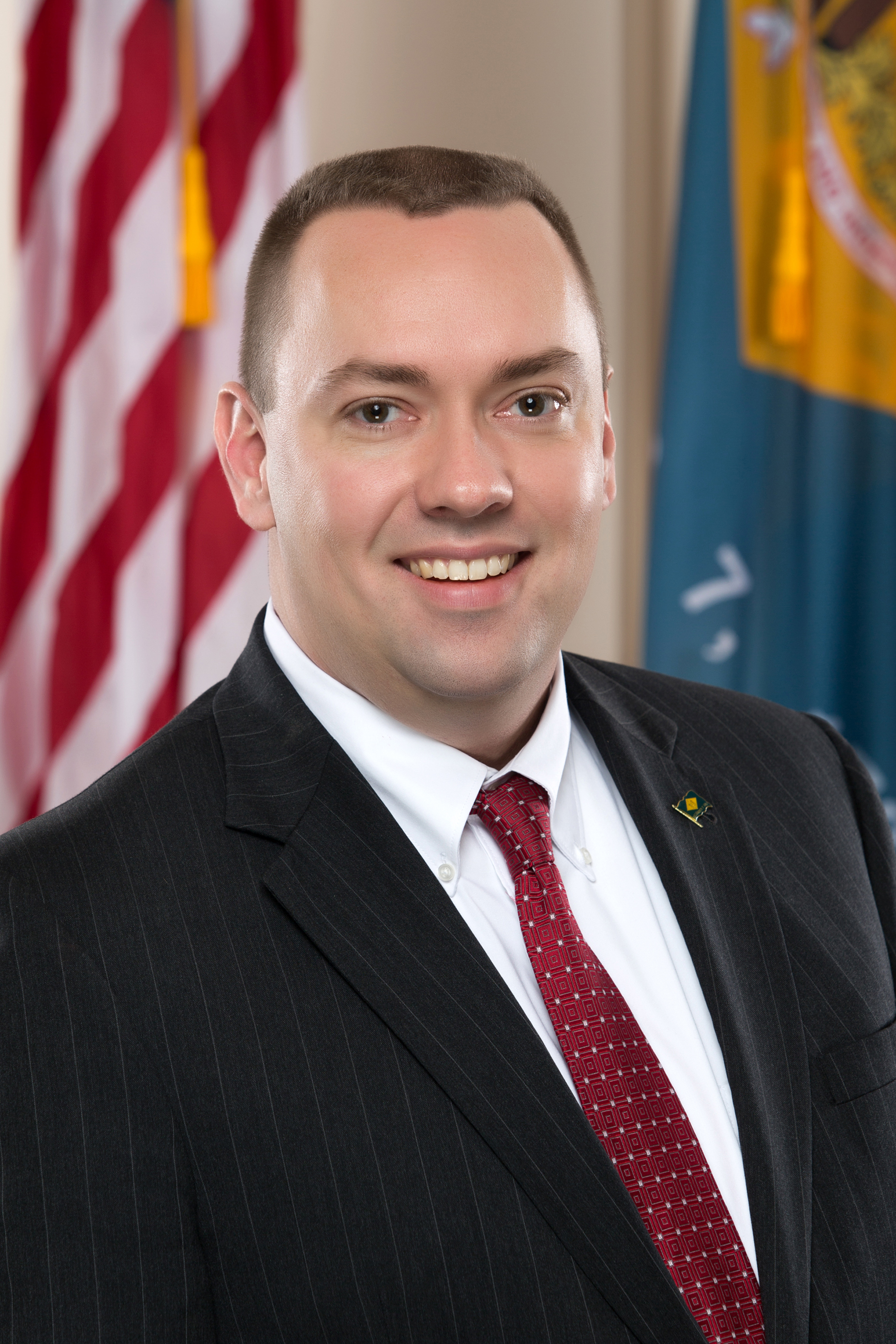

Member of the Delaware Senate from the 19th district
- Incumbent
- Assumed office November 7, 2012
- Preceded by: Joseph W. Booth

Personal details
- Born: January 11, 1974 (age 52) Milford, Delaware, U.S.
- Party: Republican
- Education: University of Delaware

Brian Pettyjohn (born January 11, 1974) is an American politician and a Republican member of the Delaware Senate, where he has represented the 19th district since 2012. He has been serving as the Senate Minority Whip since 2020. He was a member of the town council for Georgetown, Delaware from 2008 to 2010 and mayor from 2010 to 2012.

== Biography ==
Pettyjohn graduated from Sussex Central High School and the University of Delaware.

== Electoral history ==
He first ran for elective office as a member of the Georgetown, Delaware town council in 2008. He was elected to a 2-year term after defeating incumbent Chester Johnson in ward 4.

In 2010, Pettyjohn was elected mayor of Georgetown after defeating local radio personality Matt Walsh in a vote of 430 for Pettyjohn, and 25 for Walsh.

In 2012, he began a write-in campaign for Delaware Senate after incumbent Joseph W. Booth was defeated by Eric Bodenweiser in the Republican primary and Bodenweiser was subsequently indicted by a Delaware grand jury. When Bodenweiser filed the necessary paperwork to officially withdraw, Pettyjohn and the Republican Party petitioned the Delaware Department of Elections to replace Bodenweiser's name on the ballot with Pettyjohn's. The Department of Elections refused, and the Delaware Republican Party brought legal action against the department. After favorable rulings by the Delaware Court of Chancery and Delaware Supreme Court, Pettyjohn was placed on the November ballot. He won the election with slightly less than 60 percent of the vote. Pettyjohn was unopposed for reelection in the 2016, 2020, and 2022 primary and general elections.

In June 2017, Pettyjohn was charged with a felony for having a firearm on an airplane after a loaded handgun was found in his carry-on luggage at Salisbury Regional Airport by TSA agents. He did not have a concealed carry license for Maryland, although at the time he did have a valid Delaware concealed carry license. He stated he forgot the firearm was in his laptop bag, and could have faced up to 10 years in jail for the offense. However, he avoided a criminal conviction and jail time after being sentenced to 18 months of probation before judgement. He was also required to turn over his handgun as part of his plea bargain. Pettyjohn has frequently spoken out against and opposed gun control laws.

In 2018, Pettyjohn reversed his earlier support for the Delaware Equal Rights Amendment and was one of five Republican senators to vote against it after voicing concerns about current programs and policies in place to advance women's rights.

In 2019, Pettyjohn sponsored a bill to allow state funding for high school students attending trade schools and certification programs, which was signed into law in 2021.
