= Melanie Levin =

American politician from Delaware

Member of the Delaware House of Representatives from the 10th district
- Incumbent
- Assumed office November 6, 2024
- Preceded by: Sean Matthews

Personal details
- Party: Democratic
- Website: Official website

Melanie Ross Levin is an American politician. She is a Democratic member of the Delaware House of Representatives, representing district 10 since 2024. She is also director of the Delaware State Office of Women's Advancement and Advocacy and director of engagement and mobilization at the National Women's Law Center. She is Jewish.

Levin defeated Stephen Jankovic and former state representative Dennis E. Williams in the September 10, 2024 primary election. She defeated Republican Brent Burdge in the general election on November 5 with over 60% of the vote, succeeding retiring state representative Sean Matthews to represent the 10th district.
