= Laura Sturgeon =

American politician from Delaware

Member of the Delaware Senate from the 4th district
- Incumbent
- Assumed office January 8, 2019
- Preceded by: Gregory Lavelle

Personal details
- Born: February 15, 1965 (age 61)
- Party: Democratic
- Education: Brandywine High School; University of Delaware
- Profession: Teacher
- Website: Official website

Laura Viviana Sturgeon (born February 15, 1965) is an American politician. She is a member of the Delaware Senate for District 4 and the first Latina to serve in the Delaware General Assembly.

== Early life and career ==
Sturgeon was born in Florida and raised in Delaware. Her parents were immigrants from Argentina. She graduated from Brandywine High School and received her bachelor's and master's degrees at the University of Delaware. She taught in Delaware public schools for over 20 years and served as a leader in the Delaware State Education Association (DSEA), the largest union in Delaware.

== Political career ==
Sturgeon was active in community groups and nonprofit organizations but had never held public office prior to challenging Republican incumbent Greg Lavelle, who had been in the General Assembly for 18 years, where he served as Senate Minority Whip. The race between the two was considered a key race to watch in 2018. Sturgeon was endorsed by former Vice President Joe Biden.

On November 6, 2018, Sturgeon defeated Lavelle by winning 11,251 votes (53%) in the general election. Her victory was a major upset and was one of several losses for prominent Republicans in Delaware.

On November 8, 2022, Sturgeon won reelection to serve a two-year term. She defeated Republican challenger Ted Kittila by winning 10,762 votes (56.6%).

== Legislation ==
As a former teacher, Sturgeon is known for her education policy in the Senate. She sponsored a concurrent resolution establishing Delaware's Public Education Funding Commission and has introduced multiple bills to modernize reading instruction in the state.

== Electoral history ==
2018: Sturgeon defeated Republican nominee Gregory F. Lavelle with 11,251 votes (53.13%) in the General Election held on November 6, 2018.

2022: Sturgeon defeated Republican nominee Ted Kittila with 10,762 votes (56.58%) in the General Election held on November 8, 2022.

2024: Sturgeon ran unopposed in the General Election held on November 5, 2024.

Delaware Senate
Preceded by Gregory Lavelle	Member of the Delaware Senate from the 4th district 2019–Present	Incumbent
