= Vincent Lofink =

American politician

Member of the Delaware House of Representatives from the 27th district
- In office January 8, 1991 – January 13, 2009
- Preceded by: Katherine Jester
- Succeeded by: Earl Jaques Jr.

Personal details
- Party: Republican

Vincent Lofink is an American politician who served in the Delaware House of Representatives from the 27th district from 1991 to 2009.
