= Dallas Winslow =

American politician

Member of the Delaware Senate from the 4th district
- In office January 12, 1999 – January 14, 2003
- Preceded by: Richard Hauge
- Succeeded by: Charles L. Copeland

Personal details
- Party: Republican

Dallas Winslow is an American politician who served in the Delaware Senate from the 4th district from 1999 to 2003.
