= Stephanie Ulbrich =

American politician from Delaware

Member of the Delaware House of Representatives from the 25th district
- In office January 10, 1995 – January 9, 2007
- Preceded by: Steven H. Amick
- Succeeded by: John Kowalko

Personal details
- Born: January 8, 1950 (age 75); Bloomington, Illinois, US
- Political party: Republican

Stephanie Ulbrich (born January 8, 1950) is an American politician who served in the Delaware House of Representatives representing the 25th district from 1995 to 2007.
