= G. Wallace Caulk Jr. =

American politician (1941–2026)

Wallace Caulk Jr.

Member of the Delaware House of Representatives from the 33rd district
- In office January 8, 1985 – January 9, 2006
- Preceded by: Harry K.F. Terry
- Succeeded by: Robert E. Walls

Personal details
- Born: February 7, 1941 Milford, Delaware, U.S.
- Died: August 18, 2026 (aged 85)
- Party: Republican
- Spouse: Barbara

G. Wallace "Wally" Caulk Jr. (February 7, 1941 – August 18, 2026) was an American politician. He was a Republican member of the Delaware House of Representatives, representing District 33 from 1985 until his retirement in 2006. Caulk Jr. died on August 18, 2026, at the age of 85.
