= Sean Matthews =

American politician from Delaware

Member of the Delaware House of Representatives from the 10th district
- In office November 8, 2014 – November 6, 2024
- Preceded by: Dennis E. Williams
- Succeeded by: Melanie Levin

Personal details
- Party: Democratic
- Education: Eastern University
- Occupation: Teacher

Sean Matthews is an American politician. He was a Democratic member of the Delaware House of Representatives, representing District 10 until 2024. In 2014, he challenged and defeated incumbent Democrat Dennis E. Williams, who he defeated again in 2016 when Williams attempted to retake his former seat. He is a teacher at Brandywine School District.

== Electoral history ==
- In 2014, Matthews won the Democratic primary with 694 votes (55%) against incumbent Democrat Dennis E. Williams. He went on to win the general election with 3,494 votes (55.2%) against Republican nominee Judith Travis.
- In 2016, Matthews won the Democratic primary with 1,308 votes (75.5%) in a rematch against former representative Williams. Matthews went on to win the general election with 5,780 votes (57.5%) in a rematch against Republican nominee Judith Travis.
- In 2018, Matthews won the general election with 6,448 votes (68.7%) against Republican nominee Erin Wienner.
