= 2008 Delaware lieutenant gubernatorial election =

2008 Delaware Lieutenant gubernatorial election
- November 4, 2008
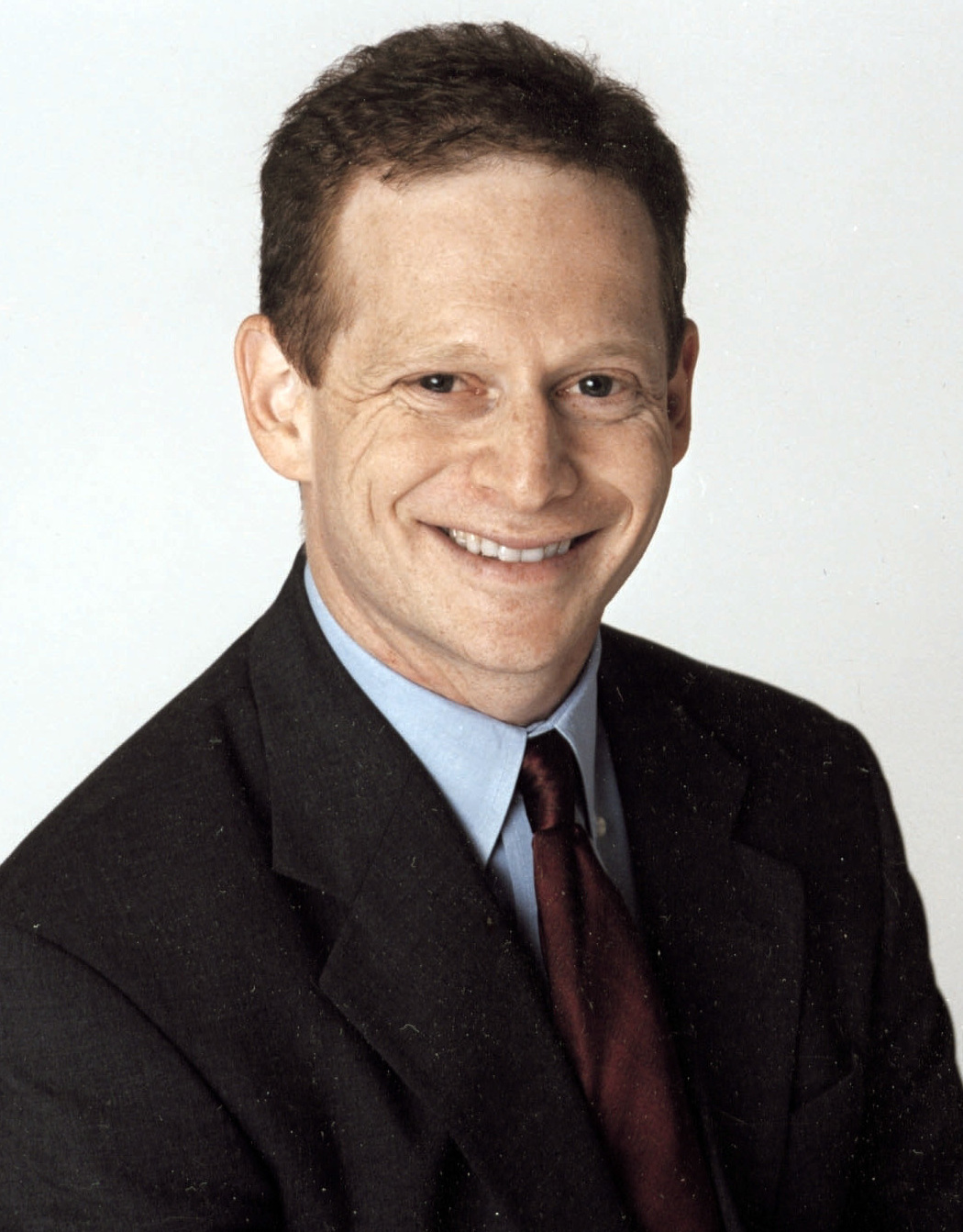

Nominee	Matthew Denn	Charlie Copeland
Party	Democratic	Republican
Popular vote	236,744	149,223
Percentage	61.3%	38.7%
- Denn: 50–60% 60–70% 70–80% 80–90% Copeland: 50–60%
Lieutenant Governor before election
John C. Carney
Democratic
Elected Lieutenant Governor
Matthew Denn
Democratic

The 2008 Delaware lieutenant gubernatorial election was held on November 4, 2008, coinciding with the Delaware gubernatorial election. Democratic nominee and Delaware State Insurance Commissioner Matthew Denn was elected lieutenant governor over Republican nominee and former State Senator Charlie Copeland in a landslide, succeeding incumbent John Carney, also a Democrat, who instead opted to run for governor.

== Candidates ==
=== Democratic Party ===
- Matthew Denn, Delaware State Insurance Commissioner

=== Republican Party ===
- Charlie Copeland, former Delaware State Senator

=== Blue Enigma Party ===
- Peter Cullen

Cullen withdrew from the race on September 29, but still appeared on the ballot.

== General election ==
=== Polling ===
Source	Date	Matthew Denn (D)	Charlie Copeland (R)
West Chester University/WHYY	October 9, 2008	53%	39%

=== Results ===
Delaware lieutenant gubernatorial election, 2008
Party	Candidate	Votes	%	±%
Democratic	Matthew Denn	236,744	61.32%	−0.78%
Republican	Charlie Copeland	149,223	38.65%	+2.40%
Blue Enigma	Peter Cullen	92	0.02%	
Majority		87,521	22.67%	−3.18%
Turnout		386,059		
Democratic hold		Swing		

== See also ==
- 2008 Delaware gubernatorial election
