= Charles L. Copeland =

American politician from Delaware

Charlie Copeland

Chair of the Delaware Republican Party
- In office July 20, 2013 – April 29, 2017
- Preceded by: John C. Sigler
- Succeeded by: Mike Harrington

Minority Leader of the Delaware Senate
- In office 2007–2008
- Preceded by: John Still III
- Succeeded by: Gary Simpson

Member of the Delaware Senate from the 4th district
- In office November 6, 2002 – June 2008
- Preceded by: Dallas Winslow
- Succeeded by: Michael Katz

Personal details
- Born: 1963 (age 62–63) Wilmington, Delaware, U.S.
- Party: Republican
- Spouse: Bonnie
- Education: Duke University (BA, MBA)

Charles L. "Charlie" Copeland (born February 1963) is an American politician. A member of the Republican Party, he served in the Delaware Senate as minority leader and also as chair of the Delaware Republican Party.

== Early life and career ==
Copeland is the grandson of Lammot du Pont Copeland and a member of the du Pont family. Copeland attended Tower Hill in Wilmington, Delaware, graduating in 1981. He enrolled at Duke University, where he earned a degree in physics and computer science.

As a teenager, he did not want to work at the family company, DuPont, but nevertheless began working there in 1985 after graduating from college. He worked in several departments but left after seven years. He later expressed criticism of the merger between DuPont and Dow Chemical in 2017 to create DowDuPont, claiming it would be "catastrophic for Delaware."

In 1994, he obtained an MBA from the Fuqua School of Business and moved back to Wilmington to manage a family commercial printing company. Three years later, he co-founded the Challenge Program, a Wilmington-based vocational training and job placement program for at-risk youth. The program provides training in construction skills and includes a workshop that produces high-end furniture. Copeland now serves on the board of directors. He previously served on the boards of the Longwood Foundation, which was founded by Pierre S. du Pont in 1937, and of the Mt. Cuba Center in Hockessin, Delaware.

== Political career ==
In 2002, Copeland challenged incumbent Republican senator, Dallas Winslow, for the Senate District 4 seat, which covers parts of Brandywine Hundred and Hockessin. He won both the primary election and general election by wide margins. He was elected minority leader in 2006 until he resigned his seat in June 2008 to run for lieutenant governor, which is elected independently from the governor in Delaware. However, he lost in the general election by 22 percent to Democrat Matt Denn, who was then the state insurance commissioner.

In June 2013, he was elected chair of the Republican State Committee of Delaware at a special convention in Dover to replace John C. Sigler, who had abruptly resigned in May. As chair, he was a delegate to the 2016 Republican National Convention and strongly defended Donald Trump for the Republican nomination. He resigned as party chair in 2017 after becoming president of the Intercollegiate Studies Institute, a nonprofit organization that builds conservative values among college students.

== Electoral history ==
- In 2002, Copeland challenged incumbent Republican Dallas Winslow and won the primary election with 2,151 votes (62.8%). He went on to win the general election with 11,592 votes (72.3%) against Democratic nominee Fred J. Boykin.
- In 2004, Copeland was unopposed in the general election, winning 16,289 votes.
- In 2008, Copeland ran for lieutenant governor but lost in the three-way general election to Matt Denn, who gained 61.3% of the vote.

Delaware Senate
Preceded by Dallas Winslow	Member of the Delaware Senate from the 4th district 2002–2008	Succeeded by Michael Katz
Preceded by John Still III	Minority Leader of the Delaware Senate; 2007–2008	Succeeded by Gary Simpson
Party political offices
Preceded by John C. Sigler	Chair of the Delaware Republican Party; 2013–2017	Succeeded by Mike Harrington
