= Joseph Booth (politician) =

American politician

Member of the Delaware Senate from the 19th district
- In office August 10, 2009 – November 7, 2012
- Preceded by: Thurman Adams Jr.
- Succeeded by: Brian G. Pettyjohn

Personal details
- Party: Republican
- Education: University of Delaware

Joseph Booth was an American politician who served in the Delaware Senate for the 19th district from 2009 to 2012. He was elected in 2009 in a special election to replace former State Senator Thurman Adams Jr., who died in office. Booth was defeated in the 2012 Republican primary by Eric Bodenweiser, who later dropped out of the race after being indicted by a grand jury.
