= Peter Schwartzkopf =

American politician (born 1955)

Speaker of the Delaware House of Representatives
- In office January 8, 2013 – June 30, 2023
- Preceded by: Robert Gilligan
- Succeeded by: Valerie Longhurst

Majority Leader of the Delaware House of Representatives
- In office January 13, 2009 – January 8, 2013
- Preceded by: Richard C. Cathcart
- Succeeded by: Valerie Longhurst

Member of the Delaware House of Representatives from the 14th district
- In office November 6, 2002 – November 5, 2024
- Preceded by: Richard DiLiberto
- Succeeded by: Claire Snyder-Hall

Personal details
- Born: January 15, 1955 (age 71) Philadelphia, Pennsylvania, U.S.
- Party: Democratic
- Education: Delaware Technical Community College; Wilmington University (BA)

Peter C. Schwartzkopf (born January 15, 1955) is an American politician and former Speaker of the Delaware House of Representatives. A member of the Democratic Party, he represented the 14th district from 2002 to 2024. His district covers Rehoboth Beach, Lewes, and Dewey Beach in Sussex County. Prior to his election to the House, he was a state police officer.

He served as Majority Leader of the House from 2009 to 2013 before being elected Speaker of the House in 2013. He stepped down from his role as speaker in June 2024 and was replaced by Valerie Longhurst.

In 2023, Schwartzkopf announced his intention to not seek reelection in the following year. He subsequently endorsed former state auditor Kathy McGuiness to take his seat representing the 14th district. Schwartzkopf is a longtime friend of McGuiness, who was forced to resign as auditor in 2022 after her criminal conviction for misdemeanor conflict of interest, a charge which Schwartkopf described as "bogus" in his endorsement. McGuiness subsequently lost the primary election to Claire Snyder-Hall, who was elected to fill the seat in the general election.

== Electoral history ==
- In 2002, Schwartzkopf won the general election with 4,530 votes (53.1%) against Republican nominee Michael A. Meoli and Libertarian nominee Everett M. Wodiska.
- In 2004, Schwartzkopf won the general election with 8,396 votes (67.8%) against Republican nominee Mary Spicer and Libertarian nominee Everett M. Wodiska.
- In 2006, Schwartzkopf won the general election with 6,610 votes (69.2%) against Republican nominee Kirk A. Pope Jr. and Independent nominee Maurice J. Barros.
- In 2008, Schwartzkopf was unopposed in the general election, winning 10,616 votes.
- In 2010, Schwartzkopf won the general election with 6,425 votes (53.7%) against Republican nominee Christopher J. Weeks.
- In 2012, Schwartzkopf won the general election with 8,250 votes (89.9%) against Libertarian nominee Margaret V. Melson.
- In 2014, Schwartzkopf was unopposed in the general election, winning 5,911 votes.
- In 2016, Schwartzkopf won the Democratic primary with 1,868 votes (73.9%) against Don R. Peterson. He went on to win the general election with 9,297 votes (63.6%) against Republican nominee James Louis DeMartino.
- In 2018, Schwartzkopf won the general election with 8,530 votes (62.5%) in a rematch against Republican nominee James Louis DeMartino.

== See also ==
- John C. Atkins
- John Kowalko

Delaware House of Representatives
Preceded by Richard C. Cathcart	Majority Leader of the Delaware House of Representatives; 2009–2013	Succeeded by Valerie Longhurst
Political offices
Preceded by Robert Gilligan	Speaker of the Delaware House of Representatives; 2013–2023	Succeeded by Valerie Longhurst
