= Robert E. Walls =

American politician

Bob Walls

Member of the Delaware House of Representatives from the 33rd district
- In office January 9, 2006 – January 11, 2011
- Preceded by: G. Wallace Caulk Jr.
- Succeeded by: Harold Peterman

Personal details
- Born: 1941 (age 84–85) Milford, Delaware
- Party: Democratic

Robert E. Walls (born 1941) is an American politician. He was a Democratic member of the Delaware House of Representatives, representing District 33 from 2006 until 2010, when he was defeated by Republican Harold Peterman in the general election.
