= Dennis E. Williams =

American politician (born 1959)

Member of the Delaware House of Representatives from the 10th district
- In office November 5, 2008 – November 8, 2014
- Preceded by: Robert Valihura
- Succeeded by: Sean Matthews

Personal details
- Born: April 7, 1959 (age 67)
- Party: Democratic
- Education: University of Delaware

Dennis E. Williams (born April 7, 1959) is a Democratic politician who represented the Talleyville-based 10th district in the Delaware House of Representatives from 2009 until 2015, when he was defeated in the Democratic primary by Sean Matthews. He unsuccessfully sought to reclaim the 10th district seat in 2016 and 2024, and also unsuccessfully ran for the Democratic nomination for Delaware State Auditor in 2018.

== Early life and education ==
Williams grew up in Cardiff, Delaware, and attended Concord High School. He graduated from the University of Delaware after majoring in accounting and financial management. He enrolled at the University of Pennsylvania and received an MS in engineering in 2008.

== Political career ==
Williams first ran to represent the 10th district in 1994 after defeating Cliff Werline in the Democratic primary by 965 to 627 votes. In the general election, he lost to incumbent Republican Jane Maroney by 29% to 71%. In 1996, Williams ran in the Democratic primary for the election for Delaware's congressional district, defeating Ernest Ercole. He was defeated by two-term incumbent Republican Mike Castle in the November general election by 70% to 27%. He lost to Castle a second time in the 1998 general election.

In 2004, Williams ran for 10th district representative but lost to incumbent Republican Robert Valihura, who received 57% of the vote. He rematched Valihura in the 2008 general election and narrowly won (51% to 49%) in a major upset, aided by an increased number of registered Democrats and a higher Democratic turnout owing to the concurrent U.S. presidential election. Williams ran for reelection in 2010, beating challengers in both the Democratic primary and general election. Williams won reelection in 2012 but was defeated in the Democratic primary in 2014 and again in 2016 by Sean Matthews.

Williams unsuccessfully sought the Democratic nomination for Delaware state auditor in 2018, losing the Democratic primary after earning 23% of the vote.

In 2024, Williams ran for his old House seat in the 10th district in a three-way race, losing with 24% of the vote. Democratic primary winner Melanie Levin would eventually win the general election and succeed Matthews as state representative.
