= Rebecca Walker (politician) =

American politician

Member of the Delaware House of Representatives from the 9th district
- In office November 2, 2010 – November 5, 2014
- Preceded by: Richard C. Cathcart
- Succeeded by: Kevin Hensley

Personal details
- Born: March 2, 1968 (age 58)
- Party: Democratic
- Education: Delaware Technical Community College; Wesley College; Widener University School of Law

Rebecca Walker (born March 2, 1968) is an American politician. In 2010, she was elected to represent the 9th district in the Delaware House of Representatives. In 2014, she declined to seek reelection to accept a director position at Widener University, and in 2015, she became deputy director of the Delaware Division of Forensic Science, which had been created months earlier through legislation she had sponsored in her final year in office. In 2021, Walker was indicted on corruption charges for falsifying records between 2015 and 2020 while deputy director.

== Biography ==
Walker earned her nursing degree from Delaware Technical Community College, her Master's degree in nursing from Wesley College, and her JD from Widener University School of Law. She worked as an emergency room nurse at Christiana Hospital for over a decade.

Walker initially ran for a seat in the Delaware House of Representatives in 2006 and 2008, losing both times in the general election to incumbent Republican Richard C. Cathcart, who had served since 2000. After Cathcart's decided to not seek reelection in 2010, Walker won the Democratic primary election before defeating Republican candidate John Marino. She was reelected in 2012 after running unopposed in both the primary and general elections.

In July 2014, Walker announced she would not seek reelection because she had accepted a position as Director of Law and Graduate Programs at Widener Law School. She announced her decision two days after the filing deadline for candidates in the 2014 election, which forced the Delaware Democratic Party to appoint a replacement. In her final year in office, Walker co-sponsored legislation as vice-chair of the House Health and Human Development committee that created a new Division of Forensic Science under the Delaware Department of Safety and Homeland Security, following a scandal regarding missing drug evidence under the former medical examiner. The following March, she began working as deputy director of the newly created Division of Forensic Science with a $92,500 salary paid by the state. The position had not been publicly advertised, which was defended by the department as proper and based on Walker's experience. In early 2020, Walker stepped down from the role and became director of nursing in the Delaware Division of Public Health.

In April 2021, Walker was indicted on misdemeanor corruption charges for allegedly falsifying employee records as deputy director at the Division of Forensic Science. According to the indictment, between May 2015 and February 2020, Walker intentionally recorded that employees passed alcohol and drug tests that they had never received. She was also placed on paid administrative leave from her position at the Division of Public Health.

== Elections ==
- In 2006, Walker challenged incumbent Republican representative Richard C. Cathcart for the 9th district seat, but she lost in the general election.
- In 2008, Walker and Cathcart faced a rematch in the general election, which Walker lost again.
- In 2010, Walker won the Democratic primary election with 970 votes (79.0%), and then later won the November general election with 5,583 votes (51.3%) against Republican nominee John Marino.
- In 2012, Walker was reelected after running unopposed in both the primary and general elections.
