= Harold Peterman =

American politician

Member of the Delaware House of Representatives from the 33rd district
- In office January 11, 2011 – August 10, 2016
- Preceded by: Robert E. Walls
- Succeeded by: Charles Postles Jr.

Personal details
- Born: July 31, 1942 Milford, Delaware, U.S.
- Died: August 10, 2016 (aged 74) Greenwood, Delaware, U.S.
- Party: Republican
- Occupation: Farmer

Harold J. "Jack" Peterman (July 31, 1942 – August 10, 2016) was an American politician. He was a Republican member of the Delaware House of Representatives, representing District 33 from 2011 until his death in 2016. Peterman was born in Milford and became a farmer after graduating from high school. He died after a period of declining health at the age of 74.

== Electoral history ==
- In 2006, Peterman ran to replace retiring Republican G. Wallace Caulk Jr., but lost in the Republican primary by 25 votes with 471 votes total (48.7%) against Ulysses S. Grant. Democratic nominee Robert E. Walls went on to win the general election against Grant.
- In 2008, Peterman was unopposed for the Republican nomination but lost the general election with 4,790 votes (46.3%) to newly elected Democrat Robert E. Walls.
- In 2010, Peterman won the Republican primary with 1,102 votes (56.3%) against Steven Rust. Peterman again faced Democrat Robert E. Walls in the general election and now won with 4,313 votes (52.2%) against Walls.
- In 2012, Peterman was unopposed for the Republican nomination and won the general election with 4,825 votes (53.4%) against Democratic nominee John Kevin Robbins.
- In 2014, Peterman won the Republican primary with 657 votes (64.5%) against Charles Postles Jr. He went on to win the general election with 3,336 votes (57.9%) in a rematch against Democratic nominee John Kevin Robbins.
