= Diana McWilliams =

American politician

Member of Delaware House of Representatives for the 6th district
- In office 2004–2009
- Succeeded by: Tom Kovach

Personal details
- Party: Democratic

Diana McWilliams is an American politician. She was a member of the Delaware House of Representatives from 2004 to 2009.
