= Thurman Adams Jr. =

Senator of Delaware, United States

Member of the Delaware Senate from the 19th district
- In office 1972–2009
- Succeeded by: Joseph W. Booth

Personal details
- Born: July 25, 1928 Bridgeville, Delaware, US
- Died: June 23, 2009 (aged 80) Dover, Delaware, US
- Party: Democratic
- Spouse: Hilda
- Education: University of Delaware
- Occupation: Politician, Business Owner, T.G. Adams & Sons, Inc.

Thurman G. Adams Jr. (July 25, 1928 – June 23, 2009) was a Democratic member of the Delaware Senate, representing the 19th District. He was the longest-serving state senator in Delaware history, at the time of his death.

== Biography ==
Adams was born in 1928 to Thurman and Bessie Lillian Adams. He was the youngest of four children, and grew up working on the farm during the Great Depression and World War II. He was educated in the public schools and graduated from the University of Delaware in 1950.

== Death ==
On June 23, 2009, Adams died from pancreatic cancer at Kent General Hospital in Dover. He was 80 years old.

== Legacy ==
The University of Delaware acquired the personal papers and collectible memorabilia of Adams in 2010. Items may be displayed as part of a special collection after review and processing.

The University of Delaware named its research and education farm in Georgetown, Delaware in honor of Adams. The research farm is named the Thurman G. Adams Agricultural Research Farm.
