= John C. Atkins =

American politician & criminal (born 1970)

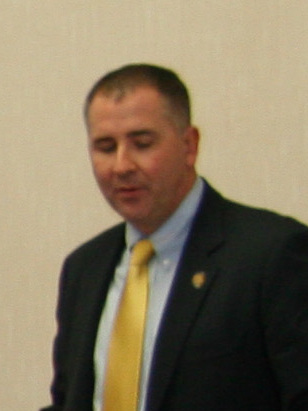

Member of the Delaware House of Representatives from the 41st district
- In office November 5, 2008 – November 7, 2014
- Preceded by: Gregory Hastings
- Succeeded by: Richard G. Collins
- In office November 6, 2002 – March 27, 2007
- Preceded by: Charles P. West
- Succeeded by: Gregory Hastings

Personal details
- Born: April 29, 1970 (age 56)
- Party: Republican (before 2008); Democratic (2008–2014)
- Criminal information
- Status: Released
- Convictions: Assault; Breach of release
- Penalty: 22 days in prison plus 1 year probation

Details
- Date apprehended: July 20, 2018

John C. Atkins (born April 29, 1970) is an American politician and former member of the Delaware House of Representatives from 2003 until 2014 representing District 41. Atkins was originally elected as a Republican in 2002, then switched to the Democratic Party in 2008 after resigning over a drunk driving incident. He eventually lost his seat to newcomer Richard G. Collins in the 2014 general election.

Atkins has been "repeatedly accused of violence against women" and arrested multiple times for domestic assault. In August 2018, he pled guilty to misdemeanor assault and breach of release charges, and was sentenced to 22 days in prison along with one year of probation.

In 2026, Atkins ran for the Republican nomination to return to the Delaware House of Representatives. In the Republican primary held on September 15, 2026, he defeated Doug Conaway and Jacki Slonin, receiving 48.7 percent of the vote. He is scheduled to face Democratic nominee Ryan Stuckey, a coffee shop owner and a competitive shooter from Dagsboro, in the general election on Tuesday, November 3, 2026.

== Political career ==
Atkins began his political career as a Republican when he won a three-way race in 2002 to replace retiring Democrat Charles P. West, who had held the 41st district seat since 1977.

In 2007, Atkins was arrested for drunk driving and tried to influence the officer by presenting his State Representative identification. He was ticketed, but later that night assaulted his wife and was arrested again for domestic violence. Atkins had a close relationship with Speaker of the House Pete Schwartzkopf, who defended Atkins after he was served with a protection order to stay away from his estranged wife. The House Ethics Committee investigated the incident and found cause to begin expulsion proceedings. Atkins then resigned. A special election was held to fill his seat and was won by Republican Gregory Hastings.

Although Atkins had resigned his seat as a Republican, he switched his party registration to Democratic. In the 2008 general election, Atkins won the general election as a Democrat against Hastings who was occupying his old seat. He was re-elected twice more as a Democrat until losing his seat to Republican Richard Collins in the 2014 general election.

== Legal troubles and domestic violence arrests ==
On October 29, 2006, Atkins was caught drunk driving and used his representative identification to gain leniency from the Ocean City, Maryland police officers and avoid arrest for the incident. An investigation by the House Ethics Committee found that Atkins had continued to drive across the Delaware state line after being instructed to refrain from driving and was arrested later that morning on a charge of offensive touching following a physical altercation with his then wife. He had attempted to avoid the domestic violence arrest by making "several attempts to speak with Millsboro police chief." Fellow Republican Richard C. Cathcart sponsored House Resolution 13 to censure Atkins, and it was approved by the House Ethics Committee. The proposed sanctions included requiring him to forgo use of his legislative identification card and legislative license plate, be removed as chairman from any legislative committees, pay a fine, receive an alcohol evaluation, and comply with court-ordered counseling. Atkins resigned from his seat on March 27, 2007, before the official censure took effect. He subsequently switched his party registration and was reelected in the next election as a member of the Democratic Party.

In 2012, Atkins resigned from the Public Safety and Homeland Security Committee after attacking a police officer in an angry email. He had received a verbal warning from the police officer after being caught speeding and sent the email to a state police captain to complain.

On June 5, 2014, the Delaware Family Court issued a restraining order for Atkins to stay away from his estranged wife and children due to allegations of violence and abuse. The next day, Atkins filed a petition against his wife claiming she was the one being abusive. As of June 13, 2014, Atkins and his wife were sharing joint custody of their children, although his wife maintained allegations of harassment and abuse. In June 2016, Atkins was arrested after a physical altercation with his ex-girlfriend. He was charged with offensive touching and criminal mischief, and decided against a bid to regain his seat that he had been considering. The charges were later dropped on the basis of insufficient evidence.

In July 2018, Atkins was arrested and charged with felony strangulation and assault after an argument with his then girlfriend where he squeezed her neck until she could not breathe. He was arrested two more times that month for domestic violence and harassment that violated a no-contact order. On August 17, 2018, he pled guilty to misdemeanor assault and breach of release charges, and was sentenced to time served, which was 22 days in prison, along with one year of probation. He remained incarcerated until he received an electronic GPS device and was prohibited from possessing a firearm for five years.

== Electoral history ==
- In 2002, Atkins ran as a Republican and won a three-way general election with 3,897 votes (59.8%) against Democratic nominee Donald Ward and Independent candidate M. Joyce Thurmon.
- In 2004, Atkins won the general election with 6,444 votes (69.9%) against Democratic nominee Barbara Lifflander.
- In 2006, Atkins won the general election with 4,199 votes (62.7%) in a rematch against Lifflander, who had also qualified and received votes under the Independent Party of Delaware.
- In 2008, Atkins switched his party affiliation to Democrat. He ran against Barbara Lifflander in the Democratic primary and won with 1,095 votes (53.9%) in their third contest against each other. He went on to win the general election with 5,665 votes (53%) against incumbent Republican Gregory Hastings, who had been elected in 2007 in the special election held after Atkins's resignation.
- In 2010, Atkins was reelected as a Democrat in a rematch against Republican nominee Gregory Hastings, winning with 4,865 votes (55.3%).
- In 2012, Atkins was reelected a third time as a Democrat when he won the general election with 4,421 votes (50.4%) against Republican nominee Richard Collins.
- In 2014, Atkins lost to newcomer Republican Richard G. Collins, receiving 47.8% of the vote.
- In 2026, Atkins won the Republican primary election. He defeated Doug Conaway and Jacki Slonin with 1,546 votes (48.7%). Atkins will face Democratic nominee Ryan Stuckey, a coffee shop owner from Dagsboro, in the general election on Tuesday, November 3, 2026.
