= Delaware's 19th Senate district =

American legislative district

Delaware's 19th State Senate district
Senator
| Brian Pettyjohn; R–Georgetown |
- Registration: 40.6% Republican; 36.4% Democratic; 23.0% No party preference
- Demographics: 67% White; 14% Black; 16% Hispanic; 1% Asian; 1% Other
- Population (2018): 49,788
- Registered voters: 30,749

Delaware's 19th Senate district is one of 21 districts in the Delaware Senate. It has been represented by Republican Brian Pettyjohn since 2012.

== Geography ==
District 19 covers central Sussex County, including the communities of Georgetown, Bridgeville, and Long Neck. It borders the state of Maryland.

Like all districts in the state, the 19th Senate district is located entirely within Delaware's at-large congressional district. It overlaps with the 20th, 35th, 36th, 37th, 39th, 40th, and 41st districts of the Delaware House of Representatives.

== Recent election results ==
Delaware Senators are elected to staggered four-year terms. Under normal circumstances, the 19th district holds elections in presidential years, except immediately after redistricting, when all seats are up for election regardless of usual cycle.

=== 2020 ===
2020 Delaware Senate election, District 19
| Party | Candidate | Votes | % |
|---|---|---|---|
| Republican | Brian Pettyjohn (incumbent) | 16,324 | 100 |
| Total votes | | 16,324 | 100 |
| Republican hold | | | |

=== 2016 ===
2016 Delaware Senate election, District 19
| Party | Candidate | Votes | % |
|---|---|---|---|
| Republican | Brian Pettyjohn (incumbent) | 14,003 | 100 |
| Total votes | | 14,003 | 100 |
| Republican hold | | | |

=== 2012 ===
2012 Delaware Senate election, District 19
| Party | Candidate | Votes | % |
|---|---|---|---|
| Republican | Brian Pettyjohn | 9,817 | 59.8 |
| Democratic | Jane Covington | 6,605 | 40.2 |
| Total votes | | 16,422 | 100 |
| Republican hold | | | |

=== Federal and statewide results ===
| Year | Office | Results |
|---|---|---|
| 2020 | President | Trump 58.1 – 40.6% |
| 2016 | President | Trump 61.4 – 35.0% |
| 2014 | Senate | Wade 58.2 – 40.2% |
| 2012 | President | Romney 55.5 – 43.1% |
| 2012 | Senate | Carper 51.9 – 41.1% |
| 2012 | Governor | Markell 56.0 – 41.7% |
