= John Kowalko =

American politician (1945–2025)

- Kowalko in 2015

Member of the Delaware House of Representatives from the 25th district
- In office November 8, 2006 – November 9, 2022
- Preceded by: Stephanie Ulbrich
- Succeeded by: Cyndie Romer

Personal details
- Born: September 17, 1945 Portsmouth, Virginia, U.S.
- Died: October 25, 2025 (aged 80)
- Party: Democratic
- Other political affiliations: Working Families Party
- Children: 2
- Education: St. Joseph's Prep; Temple University
- Profession: Machinist
- Website: Official website

John A. Kowalko Jr. (September 17, 1945 – October 25, 2025) was an American politician who was a Democratic member of the Delaware House of Representatives from 2006 to 2022. He represented District 25, which covers parts of Newark, Delaware.

As one of the first progressive members of the state legislature, he helped grow the progressive movement in the state, paving the way for many new progressives in state politics. He was praised by both Democrats and Republicans for his passionate and outspoken advocacy on numerous issues, building a reputation for fighting on behalf of government accountability and working families.

== Early life and career ==
Kowalko was born in Portsmouth, Virginia, to Adele and John Kowalko, Sr., a 24-year career Marine. He was raised in Philadelphia and graduated from St. Joseph's Prep in 1963.

He apprenticed at the Philadelphia Naval Shipyard, where he was eventually elected Treasurer and Recording Secretary. He also served as Chief Steward of the Metal Trades Council, a coalition of various trade unions at the Shipyard. He continued as a machinist for over 30 years, working at the Delaware City Refinery from 1978 to 2004, eventually rising to the role of General Foreman of LL648 IAM and being elected as Shop Steward to represent the union machinists. During his time in union leadership, he regularly represented his members in grievances against the refinery. Kowalko later commented that his union members had to work hard to maintain safe working conditions because of the company failed to invest in safety measures in order to increase profits.

Prior to running for office, Kowalko became a community advocate on a range of issues, including heating assistance for low-income families. He volunteered on behalf of poor and disadvantaged communities as a member of the Association of Community Organizations for Reform Now, which helped inspire him to pursue a public service career.

== Political career ==
In 2006, Kowalko was elected as State Representative for the 25th District. He defeated incumbent Republican Stephanie Ulbrich, who had been in office since 1994. His first legislative accomplishment was successfully sponsoring a bill to create a one-year waiting period before outgoing legislators could become political lobbyists. In his first few years in office, he was also instrumental in the push for the Delaware Offshore Wind Farm.

In 2009, he was named one of Delaware Today's "People of Influence" for his work on environmental issues. He was known for being an advocate of open government and also sponsored legislation focused on consumers, public utilities, health care, and state worker pensions. He regularly testified at Public Service Commission hearings on behalf of utility consumers. He focused on many public education issues and proposed bills to fight against school resegregation. As a champion of open government, he successfully expanded the Delaware Freedom of Information Act to increase public transparency at the University of Delaware and Delaware State University, the largest universities in the state. He chaired the Manufacturing Housing Committee and helped create a fund to help owners of manufactured homes in legal disputes. He also repeatedly advocated for raising the tax rate for wealthy individuals at the top of the income brackets. He helped found the Delaware Working Families Party.

Kowalko became known for his passionate and outspoken stances and was described as a "maverick" for being willing to publicly disagree with his own party, including Governor Jack Markell and other Democratic party leadership. In 2015, he helped lead an attempt to remove Democratic House Speaker Peter Schwartzkopf from his leadership position, which resulted in Schwartzkopf taking Kowalko off several committees. Schwartzkopf stated that Kowalko was an "activist," while Kowalko called Schwartzkopf's actions an "abuse of power." Kowalko's participation in local community meetings and strong constituent support in his district was cited as allowing him to take on his own party leadership. One of his fellow legislators later remarked, "When you door knock with John Kowalko in the 25th, you find that his constituents want to hoist him on their shoulders."

In March 2015, Kowalko and State Senator Dave Lawson sponsored a bi-partisan bill to allow parents and their children to "opt out" of statewide standardized testing. The bill was supported by the Delaware State Education Association (DSEA) and the Delaware Parent Teacher Association (PTA). After two contentious committee hearings, the bill passed both houses nearly unanimously but was vetoed by Governor Markell. Kowalko and Lawson criticized the action and attempted the first veto override since 1977, but it ultimately failed in the House after being blocked from debate by Schwartzkopf.

In 2018, Kowalko described the actions of Democratic Governor John Carney as "Trumpian" after Carney used an Executive Order to enact restrictions on the legislative budget that had failed to pass the General Assembly and was opposed by Kowalko. Kowalko argued that the executive order would lead to budget cuts that would harm the most vulnerable Delawareans and increase the tax burdens on poor and middle class residents.

In 2022, Kowalko did not seek reelection and was succeeded by Cyndie Romer. Despite his previous disputes with the Democratic leadership in the House, they issued a statement upon his retirement describing him as a "champion of working-class Delawareans, the marginalized and the underprivileged during his time in office" who faithfully served his community and state for the 16 years he was in office. Fellow progressive legislators, such as Paul Baumbach, Eric Morrison, and Madinah Wilson-Anton, cited him as an inspiration, while Representative Edward Osienski described him as a respected mentor.

In the months prior to his retirement, Kowalko founded Rise Delaware and helped lead the organization in opposing the Governor Carney's decision to move retired state employees to privatized Medicare Advantage plans. Kowalko questioned the lack of transparency surrounding the attempted move, and after a lawsuit against the state filed by Rise Delaware prevented the change, he filed legislation to restore prior benefits. In June 2024, lawmakers change the law to prevent future attempts to require Medicare Advantage for state retirees. After his retirement from office, Kowalko also continued to be involved in multiple local community organizations, including Progressive Democrats of Delaware, Alliance for Health Care Reform, and the Delaware Academy of Science. He continued to advocate for the creation of a Delaware Office of the Inspector General, and had previously sponsored legislation to create the office while a legislator. In August 2025, after almost 20 years advocating for the office, Kowalko attended the signing of legislation by Governor Matt Meyer to create a Delaware Office of the Inspector General.

== Personal life ==
Kowalko was married to Constance Merlet, a former school board member for the Christina School District and director of the nonprofit Willa Road Day Care. They lived in Delaware since 1983 and had two children.

On October 25, 2025, Kowalko died at the age of 80. Upon hearing the news of his death, former Delaware House member Paul Baumbach praised him as "Delaware's Bernie Sanders". His successor in office, Cyndie Romer, described his legacy as "demanding that government hold itself to the highest levels of accountability and transparency and always focus on working in the best interest of everyday citizens".

== Electoral history ==
- In 2004, Kowalko lost his first election to incumbent Republican Representative Stephanie Ulbrich in the general election.
- In 2006, Kowalko won a rematch with Ulbrich in the general election with 2,473 votes (52.0%).
- In 2008, Kowalko won the general election with 5,008 votes (73.4%) against Republican nominee James Gates, brother-in-law of Ulbrich.
- In 2010, Kowalko won the general election with 3,402 votes (65.5%) against Republican nominee Gordon Winegar.
- In 2012, Kowalko was unopposed in the general election and won 5,674 votes.
- In 2014, Kowalko was unopposed in the general election and won 3,098 votes.
- In 2016, Kowalko won the general election with 5,123 votes (68.6%) against Republican nominee Michael Nagorski.
- In 2018, Kowalko won the general election with 4,027 votes (64.8%) against his Republican challenger.
- In 2020, Kowalko was unopposed in the general election and won 6,041 votes.
