= Earl Jaques Jr. =

American politician

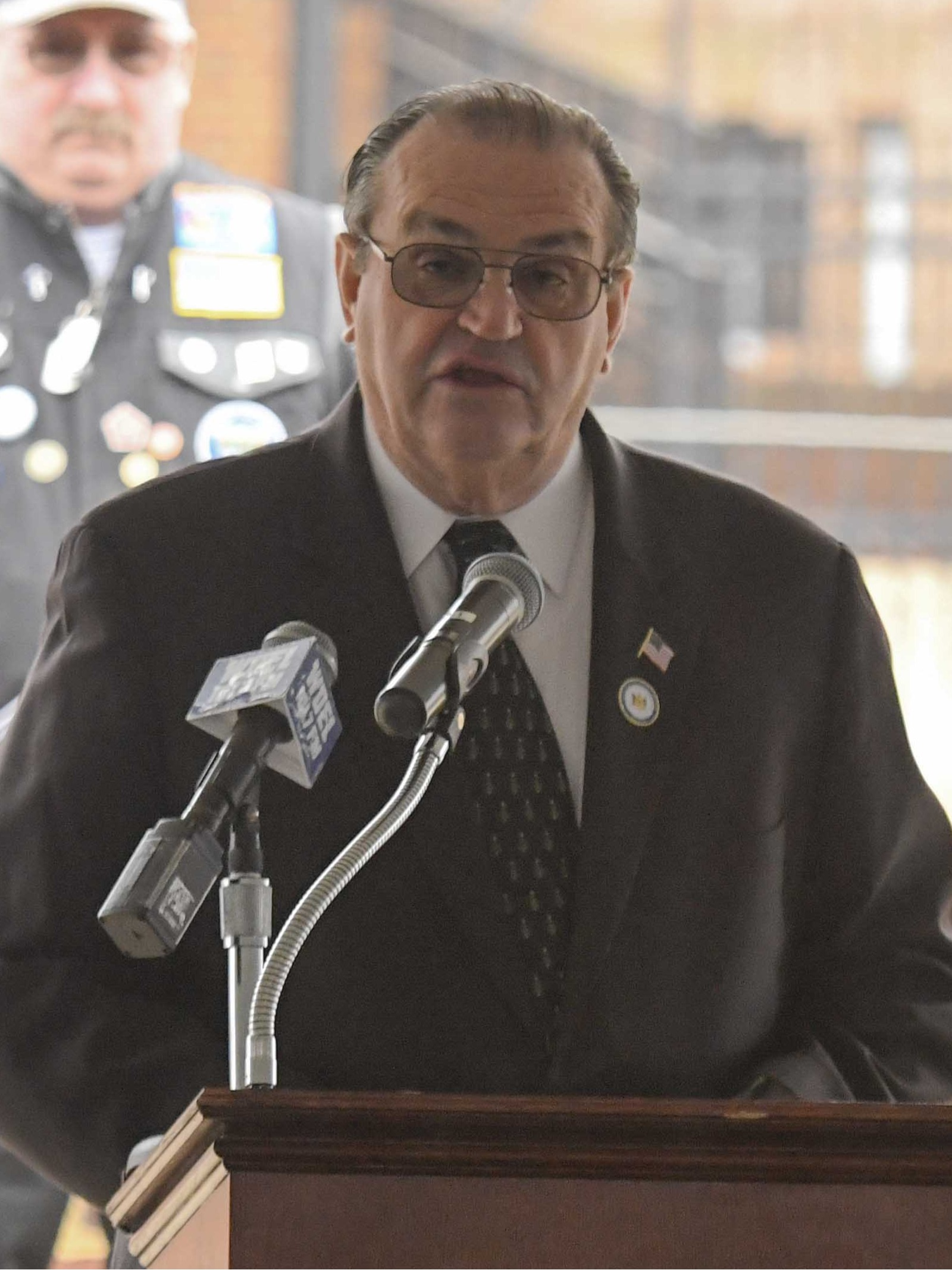
- Earl Jacques speaks at Wreaths Across America

Member of the Delaware House of Representatives from the 27th district
- In office November 4, 2008 – November 4, 2020
- Preceded by: Vincent Lofink
- Succeeded by: Eric Morrison

Personal details
- Born: October 5, 1947 (age 79) Menominee, Michigan, U.S.
- Party: Democratic
- Education: Columbia Southern University
- Website: jaquesfordelaware.com

Military service
- Branch/service: Delaware Air National Guard
- Rank: Colonel (retired)

Earl G. Jaques Jr. (born October 5, 1947) is an American politician. He was a Democratic member of the Delaware House of Representatives from 2008 to 2020, representing District 27. Jaques earned a B.S. in business administration from Columbia Southern University.

Jaques is a member of the conservative wing of the Democratic Party, and was known for his largely anti-gay voting record while in the Delaware House of Representatives. In October 2019, Jaques apologized for mocking his opponent for the Democratic nomination, Eric Morrison, for being gay. Morrison subsequently defeated Jaques by a 22-point margin in the primary election.

== Electoral history ==
- In 2006, Jaques lost the general election to incumbent Republican Representative Vincent Lofink, who had held the seat since 1990.
- In 2008, Jaques challenged Lofink in a rematch and won the three-way general election by 46 votes with 4,708 votes total (48.7%) against Lofink—who had also qualified and received votes as the Working Families Party nominee—and Independent nominee James Spencer.
- In 2010, Jaques won the Democratic primary with 781 votes (64.3%), and went on to win the general election with 4,654 votes (64.9%) against Republican nominee Jay Galloway.
- In 2012, Jaques won the general election unopposed.
- In 2014, Jaques won the general election unopposed.
- In 2016, Jaques won the general election unopposed.
- In 2018, Jaques won the general election with 7,123 votes (85.3%) against Republican nominee William Hinds.
- In 2020, Jaques was defeated in the Democratic primary by challenger Eric Morrison by a 61% to 39% of the votes.
