= Delaware's 4th Senate district =

American legislative district

Delaware's 4th State Senate district
Senator
Laura Sturgeon; D–Brandywine
- Registration: 40.9% Democratic; 31.9% Republican; 27.2% No party preference
- Demographics: 78% White; 5% Black; 3% Hispanic; 11% Asian; 2% Other
- Population (2018): 40,878
- Registered voters: 34,257

Delaware's 4th Senate district is one of 21 districts in the Delaware Senate. It has been represented by Democrat Laura Sturgeon since 2018, following her defeat of incumbent Republican Gregory Lavelle.

== Geography ==
District 4 covers many of Wilmington's northwestern suburbs in New Castle County, including Hockessin, Greenville, Pike Creek, Talleyville, Granogue, Brandywine, Alapocas, Montchanin, Runnymeade, Delaware Heights, Rockland, Winterthur, Wooddale, and other unincorporated areas.

Like all districts in the state, the 4th Senate district is located entirely within Delaware's at-large congressional district. It overlaps with the 4th, 12th, 21st, and 22nd districts of the Delaware House of Representatives. The district borders Pennsylvania along the Twelve-Mile Circle.

== Recent election results ==
Delaware Senators are elected to staggered four-year terms. Under normal circumstances, the 4th district holds elections in midterm years, except immediately after redistricting, when all seats are up for election regardless of usual cycle.

=== 2024 ===
Delaware Senate 4th district general election, 2024
Party	Candidate	Votes	%
Democratic	Laura Sturgeon (incumbent)	18,984	100%
Total votes		18,984	100%
Democratic hold			

=== 2018 ===
2018 Delaware Senate election, District 4
Party	Candidate	Votes	%
Democratic	Laura Sturgeon	11,251	53.1
Republican	Gregory Lavelle (incumbent)	9,924	46.9
Total votes		21,175	100
Democratic gain from Republican			

=== 2014 ===
2014 Delaware Senate election, District 4
Party	Candidate	Votes	%
Republican	Gregory Lavelle (incumbent)	8,983	61.9
Democratic	Sarah Buttner	5,521	38.1
Total votes		14,504	100
Republican hold			

=== 2012 ===
2012 Delaware Senate election, District 4
Party	Candidate	Votes	%
Republican	Gregory Lavelle	11,970	50.8
Democratic	Michael Katz (incumbent)	11,188	47.5
Libertarian	Marcia Groff	410	1.7
Total votes		23,568	100
Republican gain from Democratic			

=== Federal and statewide results ===
Year	Office	Results
2020	President	Biden 60.9 – 37.5%
2016	President	Clinton 53.5 – 41.1%
2014	Senate	Coons 53.8 – 44.1%
2012	President	Obama 49.9 – 48.6%
2012	Senate	Carper 61.6 – 34.1%
2012	Governor	Markell 67.0 – 31.3%
