= Donald Blakey =

American politician

Member of the Delaware House of Representatives from the 34th district
- In office November 7, 2006 – November 5, 2014
- Preceded by: Gerald Buckworth
- Succeeded by: Lyndon Yearick

Personal details
- Born: February 5, 1936 (age 90) Washington, D.C.
- Party: Republican
- Education: Delaware State College; University of Maryland, College Park; Pacific Western University
- Website: repdonaldblakey.com

Donald A. Blakey (born February 5, 1936, in Washington, D.C.) is an American politician and a former Republican member of the Delaware House of Representatives representing District 34.

== Education ==
Blakey earned his BS in physical education from Delaware State College (now Delaware State University), his MA from University of Maryland, College Park, and his PhD in theatre arts from Pacific Western University (now California Miramar University).

== Elections ==
- 2012 Blakey was unopposed for the September 11, 2012 Republican Primary and won the three-way November 6, 2012 General election with 5,680 votes (56.7%) against Democratic nominee Theodore Yacucci and Independent Party of Delaware candidate Douglas Beatty.
- 2006 When Republican Representative Gerald Buckworth retired and left the District 34 seat open, Blakey was unopposed for the September 12, 2006 Republican Primary and won the November 7, 2006 General election with 3,560 votes (56.1%) against Democratic nominee M. Jeanine Kleimo.
- 2008 Blakey was unopposed for the September 9, 2008 Republican Primary and won the November 4, 2008 General election with 6,229 votes (61.3%) against Democratic nominee G. Bruce Hamilton.
- 2010 Blakey was unopposed for the September 17, 2010 Republican Primary and won the four-way November 2, 2010 General election with 5,015 votes (61.7%) against Democratic nominee Jill Fuchs, Independent Party of Delaware candidate Johnathan Marango, and Independent Michael Tedesco.
