= Gregory Lavelle =

American politician from Delaware

Member of the Delaware Senate from the 4th district
- In office January 8, 2013 – January 8, 2019
- Preceded by: Michael Katz
- Succeeded by: Laura Sturgeon

Minority Leader of the Delaware House of Representatives
- In office January 12, 2011 – January 8, 2013
- Preceded by: Richard Cathcart
- Succeeded by: Daniel Short

Member of the Delaware House of Representatives from the 11th district
- In office January 9, 2001 – January 8, 2013
- Preceded by: Catherine Cloutier
- Succeeded by: Deborah Hudson (Redistricting)

Personal details
- Born: September 17, 1963 (age 63) Wilmington, Delaware, U.S.
- Party: Republican
- Education: University of Delaware (BS); University of Pennsylvania (MS)
- Website: Official website

Gregory F. Lavelle is an American politician who was a Republican member of the Delaware General Assembly from 2001 to 2019, serving in both the Delaware Senate and the Delaware House of Representatives. In the 2018 midterm elections, he lost his seat in the general election to Democrat Laura Sturgeon.

Lavelle was elected to the Delaware House of Representatives in 2000 to replace Republican Catherine Cloutier, who had won a seat in the Delaware Senate. He served as the minority leader in the House from 2011 to 2013, during which time he was a leading opponent to marriage equality in Delaware.

In 2012, Lavelle resigned his House seat to challenge incumbent Democrat Michael Katz in the Senate's 4th district, which he won in a three-way general election. He served as the minority whip when he was ousted from his seat in 2018 in a major upset that was one of several losses for prominent Republicans in Delaware. His loss came after a contentious election where Lavelle and the Democratic Party of Delaware traded accusations of misconduct and campaign violations, as well as the focus on Lavelle's anti-gay voting record.

Lavelle earned his BS in business administration from the University of Delaware and his MS in government administration from the University of Pennsylvania.

== Political positions ==
Lavelle was a large proponent against LGBT rights during his time in the Delaware General Assembly. He voted against adding sexual orientation to Delaware anti-discrimination laws in 2009, and voted against adding gender identity to anti-discrimination laws in 2013. In 2011, Lavelle voted against legalizing same-sex civil unions and voted against legalizing same-sex marriage in 2013.

Lavelle voted against repealing the death penalty in Delaware in 2013. The death penalty was ultimately abolished in Delaware in 2016.

In 2011, Lavelle voted against legalizing medical marijuana in Delaware and against decriminalizing recreational marijuana in 2015. However, Lavelle voted in favor of legalizing medical marijuana to treat anxiety in 2015 and for reducing punishments for drug possession in 2011.

== Electoral history ==
- In 2000, Lavelle won the three-way Republican primary for the House District 11 seat with 1,132 votes (50.7%). He went on to win the general election with 6,090 votes (64.3%) against Democratic nominee Steven Biener.
- In 2002, Lavelle won the general election with 4,961 votes (65.7%) against Democratic nominee Michael Paul.
- In 2004, Lavelle was unopposed in the general election, winning 7,702 votes.
- In 2006, Lavelle won the general election with 4,635 votes (58.0%) against Democratic nominee Eric Levin.
- In 2008, Lavelle won the general election with 6,731 votes (63.3%) against Democratic nominee Charles Old.
- In 2010, Lavelle won the general election with 5,198 votes (61.0%) against Democratic nominee Joshua Schoenberg.
- In 2012, resigned from the House and won the three-way general election for the Senate District 4 seat with 11,970 votes (50.8%) against incumbent Democrat Michael Katz and Libertarian nominee Marcia Davinci Groff.
- In 2014, Lavelle won the general election with 8,983 votes (61.9%) against Democratic nominee Sarah Buttner.
- In 2018, Lavelle lost his seat to Democratic challenger Laura Sturgeon, who received 11,251 votes (53.13%) to defeat Lavelle.

Delaware House of Representatives
Preceded by Catherine Cloutier	Member of the Delaware House of Representatives from the 11th district 2001–2013	Succeeded by Jeffrey Spiegelman
Preceded by Richard Cathcart	Minority Leader of the Delaware House of Representatives; 2011–2013	Succeeded by Daniel Short
Delaware Senate
Preceded by Michael Katz	Member of the Delaware Senate from the 4th district 2013–2019	Succeeded by Laura Sturgeon
