= Richard C. Cathcart =

American politician (born 1944)

Richard C. Cathcart (born November 19, 1944) is a former Republican member of the Delaware House of Representatives for District 9. He served as minority leader for two years before his retirement in 2011. He previously served as a state representative from 1978 to 1982 and again from 1997 to 2007. He worked for Delaware State University while he was in office.

In 2006, Cathcart sponsored House Resolution 13 to censure fellow Republican John C. Atkins after an incident where Atkins used his representative identification to gain leniency for drunk driving and was then arrested the same day for domestic violence. The proposed sanctions included requiring him to forgo use of his legislative identification card and legislative license plate, be removed as chairman from any legislative committees, pay a fine, receive an alcohol evaluation, and comply with court-ordered counseling. The resolution was stricken after Atkins resigned from his seat.

Cathcart received a BA in business administration from Wilmington College. He resides in Middletown, Delaware with his wife.

Delaware House of Representatives
Preceded by Wayne Smith	Minority Leader; 2009–2011	Succeeded by Gregory Lavelle
