= 2022 Delaware Senate election =

- November 8, 2022

All 21 seats in the Delaware Senate 11 seats needed for a majority
- Turnout: 42.68%

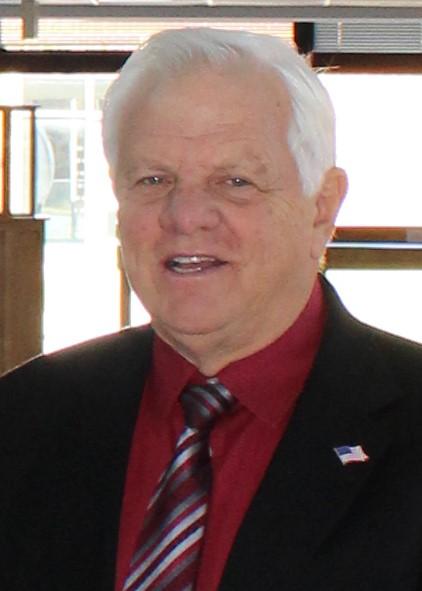
	Majority party	Minority party
Leader	David Sokola	Gerald Hocker
Party	Democratic	Republican
Leader since	November 4, 2020	November 7, 2018
Leader's seat	8th - Newark	20th - Ocean View
Last election	14	7
Seats before	14	7
Seats won	15	6
Seat change	▲1	▼1
Popular vote	144,347	132,280
Percentage	52.18%	47.82%
- Results: Democratic hold Democratic gain Republican hold
President pro tempore before election
David Sokola
Democratic
Elected President pro tempore
David Sokola
Democratic

The 2022 Delaware Senate election were held on November 8, 2022, concurrently with the elections for the Delaware House of Representatives, to elect members to the Delaware General Assembly. All of the 21 seats in the Delaware Senate were up for election. The Democratic and Republican primaries were held on September 13, 2022.

Democrats gained one seat, increasing their supermajority to 15 out of 21 seats.

== Background ==
=== Predictions ===
Source	Ranking	As of
Sabato's Crystal Ball	Safe D	May 19, 2022

== Overview ==
Party	Candidates	Votes		Seats		
Party	Candidates	No.	%	Before	After	+/–
Democratic	16	144,368	51.85	14	15	▲1
Republican	14	132,293	47.51	7	6	▼1
Independent	0	1,257	0.45	0	0	Steady
Libertarian	1	541	0.19	0	0	Steady
Total		278,459	100.00	21	21	

=== Summary by district ===
District	Incumbent	Party	Elected Senator	Party
1st	Sarah McBride	Dem	Sarah McBride	Dem
2nd	Darius Brown	Dem	Darius Brown	Dem
3rd	Elizabeth Lockman	Dem	Elizabeth Lockman	Dem
4th	Laura Sturgeon	Dem	Laura Sturgeon	Dem
5th	Kyle Evans Gay	Dem	Kyle Evans Gay	Dem
6th	Ernesto Lopez	Rep	Russ Huxtable	Dem
7th	Spiros Mantzavinos	Dem	Spiros Mantzavinos	Dem
8th	David Sokola	Dem	David Sokola	Dem
9th	Jack Walsh	Dem	Jack Walsh	Dem
10th	Stephanie Hansen	Dem	Stephanie Hansen	Dem
11th	Bryan Townsend	Dem	Bryan Townsend	Dem
12th	Nicole Poore	Dem	Nicole Poore	Dem
13th	Marie Pinkney	Dem	Marie Pinkney	Dem
14th	Bruce Ennis	Dem	Kyra Hoffner	Dem
15th	Dave Lawson	Rep	Dave Lawson	Rep
16th	Colin Bonini	Rep	Eric Buckson	Rep
17th	Trey Paradee	Dem	Trey Paradee	Dem
18th	Dave Wilson	Rep	Dave Wilson	Rep
19th	Brian Pettyjohn	Rep	Brian Pettyjohn	Rep
20th	Gerald Hocker	Rep	Gerald Hocker	Rep
21st	Bryant Richardson	Rep	Bryant Richardson	Rep

=== Closest races ===
Seats where the margin of victory was under 10%:

1. District 6, 3.95% gain
2. District 14, 2.66%

== Retiring incumbents ==
=== Democrats ===
1. District 14: Bruce Ennis retired.

=== Republicans ===
1. District 6: Ernesto Lopez retired.

== Incumbents defeated ==
=== In primary elections ===
==== Republicans ====
1. District 16: Colin Bonini lost renomination to Eric Buckson.

== Detailed results ==
=== District 1 ===
The 1st district covers the northeastern tip of New Castle County along the Delaware River, including Claymont, Bellefonte, most of Edgemoor, and parts of northern Wilmington. First-term Democratic incumbent Sarah McBride, who was elected in 2020 with 73.3% of the vote, won a second term unopposed.

Delaware Senate 1st district general election, 2022
Party	Candidate	Votes	%
Democratic	Sarah McBride (incumbent)	13,204	100%
Total votes		13,204	100%
Democratic hold			

=== District 2 ===
The 2nd district is based in southern and eastern Wilmington along the Delaware River in New Castle County, also covering Minquadale and parts of New Castle and Edgemoor. First-term Democratic incumbent Darius Brown, who was unopposed in 2018, won a second term unopposed.

Delaware Senate 2nd district general election, 2022
Party	Candidate	Votes	%
Democratic	Darius Brown (incumbent)	7,689	100%
Total votes		7,689	100%
Democratic hold			

=== District 3 ===
The 3rd district is based in downtown Wilmington, also covering some unincorporated areas to the south. First-term Democratic incumbent Elizabeth Lockman, who was unopposed in 2018, won a second term unopposed.

Delaware Senate 3rd district general election, 2022
Party	Candidate	Votes	%
Democratic	Elizabeth Lockman (incumbent)	5,714	100%
Total votes		5,714	100%
Democratic hold			

=== District 4 ===
The 4th district covers many of Wilmington's northwestern suburbs in New Castle County, including Hockessin, Greenville, Pike Creek, Talleyville, Granogue, Brandywine, Alapocas, Montchanin, Runnymeade, Delaware Heights, Rockland, Winterthur, Wooddale, and other unincorporated areas. First-term Democratic incumbent Laura Sturgeon, who was elected in 2018 with 53.1% of the vote, won a second term.

Delaware Senate 4th district general election, 2022
Party	Candidate	Votes	%
Democratic	Laura Sturgeon (incumbent)	10,762	56.58%
Republican	Ted Kittila	8,259	43.42%
Total votes		19,021	100%
Democratic hold			

=== District 5 ===
The 5th district covers the northern suburbs of Wilmington in New Castle County including Arden, Ardencroft, Ardentown, Windsor Hills, Naamans Manor, Wilmont, Talleys Corner, Afton, Shellburne, Windybush, Heatherbrooke, Chalfonte, and other unincorporated areas. First-term Democratic incumbent Kyle Evans Gay, who was elected in 2020 with 52.3% of the vote, won a second term.

Delaware Senate 5th district general election, 2022
Party	Candidate	Votes	%
Democratic	Kyle Evans Gay (incumbent)	10,471	66.28%
Republican	Daniel Schmick	5,328	33.72%
Total votes		15,799	100%
Democratic hold			

=== District 6 ===
The 6th district is based in the Cape Region in coastal Sussex County, covering Rehoboth Beach, Lewes, Milton, and the surrounding communities. Three-term Republican incumbent Ernesto Lopez, who was re-elected in 2018 with 52.6% of the vote, announced in July 2022 that he would not run for re-election. Democrat Russ Huxtable went on to flip the seat in the general election.

==== Democratic primary ====
Delaware Senate 6th district Democratic primary election, 2022
Party	Candidate	Votes	%
Democratic	Russ Huxtable	3,938	67.90%
Democratic	Jack Bucchioni	1,862	32.10%
Total votes		5,800	100%

==== General election ====
Delaware Senate 6th district general election, 2022
Party	Candidate	Votes	%
Democratic	Russ Huxtable	14,131	51.48%
Republican	Stephen Smyk	13,048	47.53%
Non-Partisan Delaware	Gwendolyn Jones	271	0.99%
Total votes		27,450	100%
Democratic gain from Republican			

=== District 7 ===
The 7th district covers the immediate western suburbs of Wilmington in New Castle County, including Elsmere, Newport, Westminster, Anglesey, and other unincorporated areas. First-term Democratic incumbent Spiros Mantzavinos, who was elected in 2020 with 51.4% of the vote, won a second term.

Delaware Senate 7th district general election, 2022
Party	Candidate	Votes	%
Democratic	Spiros Mantzavinos (incumbent)	7,663	58.69%
Republican	Sherm Porter	5,394	41.31%
Total votes		13,057	100%
Democratic hold			

=== District 8 ===
The 8th district is based in Newark – the state's third-largest city – and also covers parts of Hockessin and North Star. Ten-term Democratic incumbent David Sokola, who was unopposed in 2020, won an eleventh term.

Delaware Senate 8th district general election, 2022
Party	Candidate	Votes	%
Democratic	David Sokola (incumbent)	8,462	62.87%
Republican	Victor John Setting	4,998	37.13%
Total votes		13,460	100%
Democratic hold			

=== District 9 ===
The 9th district covers the areas between Newark and Wilmington in New Castle County, including parts of Pike Creek, Pike Creek Valley, Newport, Stanton, and far eastern Newark proper. Second-term Democratic incumbent Jack Walsh, who was elected in 2020 with 67.1% of the vote, won a third term.

Delaware Senate 9th district general election, 2022
Party	Candidate	Votes	%
Democratic	Jack Walsh (incumbent)	7,172	61.50%
Republican	Brenda Mennella	4,490	38.50%
Total votes		11,662	100%
Democratic hold			

=== District 10 ===
The 10th district is based in Middletown, also covering Mount Pleasant, Summit Bridge, western Glasgow, and the southernmost reaches of Newark. First-term Democratic incumbent Stephanie Hansen, who was elected in 2018 with 62.1% of the vote, won a second term unopposed.

Delaware Senate 10th district general election, 2022
Party	Candidate	Votes	%
Democratic	Stephanie Hansen (incumbent)	10,800	100%
Total votes		10,800	100%
Democratic hold			

=== District 11 ===
The 11th district covers communities immediately to the east of Newark in New Castle County, including Brookside, Christiana, Woodshade, Taylortown, and some of Bear. Third-term Democratic incumbent Bryan Townsend, who was elected in 2018 with 75.8% of the vote, won a fourth term unopposed.

Delaware Senate 11th district general election, 2022
Party	Candidate	Votes	%
Democratic	Bryan Townsend (incumbent)	8,843	100%
Total votes		8,843	100%
Democratic hold			

=== District 12 ===
The 12th district covers much of central New Castle County along the Delaware River, including Delaware City, Wrangle Hill, Williamsburg, Kirkwood, Greylag, Bayview Manor, Monterey Farms, and parts of Glasgow, Bear, New Castle, and Wilmington Manor. Third-term Democratic incumbent Nicole Poore, who was unopposed in 2020, won a fourth term.

Delaware Senate 12th district general election, 2022
Party	Candidate	Votes	%
Democratic	Nicole Poore (incumbent)	10,226	62.15%
Republican	Bill Alexander	6,228	37.85%
Total votes		16,454	100%
Democratic hold			

=== District 13 ===
The 13th district covers much of unincorporated New Castle County to the south of Wilmington, including Red Lion, Monterey Farms, Fairwinds, Duross Heights, Clearvier Manor, and parts of Bear and Wilmington Manor. First-term Democratic incumbent Marie Pinkney, who was elected in 2020 with 75.8% of the vote, won a second term unopposed.

Delaware Senate 13th district general election, 2022
Party	Candidate	Votes	%
Democratic	Marie Pinkney (incumbent)	8,611	100%
Total votes		8,611	100%
Democratic hold			

=== District 14 ===
The 14th district straddles the border between New Castle County and Kent County, covering all of Smyrna, Clayton, Odessa, Blackbird, and Leipsic, as well as parts of Middletown. Four-term Democratic incumbent Bruce Ennis, who was re-elected in 2020 with 59.5% of the vote, announced in 2021 that he would not run for re-election. Democrat Kyra Hoffner went on to win the seat in the general election.

==== Democratic primary ====
Delaware Senate 14th district Democratic primary election, 2022
Party	Candidate	Votes	%
Democratic	Kyra Hoffner	1,015	34.37%
Democratic	Michael Hill-Shaner	794	26.89%
Democratic	Kevin Musto	570	19.30%
Democratic	Robert Sebastiano	312	10.57%
Democratic	Sam Noel	262	8.87%
Total votes		2,953	100%

==== General election ====
Delaware Senate 14th district general election, 2022
Party	Candidate	Votes	%
Democratic	Kyra Hoffner	8,404	51.83%
Republican	Mark Pugh	7,811	48.17%
Total votes		16,215	100%
Democratic hold			

=== District 15 ===
The 15th district covers much of Kent County to the west of Dover, including Cheswold, Felton, Kenton, Marydel, Hartly, Willow Grove, Petersburg, Sandtown, and part of Viola. Four-term Republican incumbent Dave Lawson, who was elected in 2020 with 55.3% of the vote, won a fifth term unopposed.

Delaware Senate 15th district general election, 2022
Party	Candidate	Votes	%
Republican	Dave Lawson (incumbent)	11,814	100%
Total votes		11,814	100%
Republican hold			

=== District 16 ===
The 16th district covers southern Dover and its suburbs in Kent County, including Highland Acres, Rising Sun-Lebanon, Kent Acres, Riverview, Magnolia, Woodside, Woodside East, Frederica, Little Creek, Bowers, and Little Heaven. Nine-term Republican incumbent Colin Bonini, who was elected in 2018 with 55% of the vote, lost the September 13th Republican primary, finishing last place in a 3-way race. Republican Eric Buckson went on to win the general election unopposed.

==== Republican primary ====
Delaware Senate 16th district Republican primary election, 2022
Party	Candidate	Votes	%
Republican	Eric Buckson	1,915	51.11%
Republican	Kim Petters	1,017	27.14%
Republican	Colin Bonini (incumbent)	815	21.75%
Total votes		3,747	100%

==== General election ====
Delaware Senate 16th district general election, 2022
Party	Candidate	Votes	%
Republican	Eric Buckson	9,577	100%
Total votes		9,577	100%
Republican hold			

=== District 17 ===
The 17th district is based in Dover, covering most of the city proper as well as the nearby Kent County communities of Camden, Wyoming, and Rodney Village. First-term Democratic incumbent Trey Paradee, who was elected in 2018 with 64.3% of the vote, won a second term.

Delaware Senate 17th district general election, 2022
Party	Candidate	Votes	%
Democratic	Trey Paradee (incumbent)	7,551	64.40%
Republican	Ed Ruyter	4,174	35.60%
Total votes		11,725	100%
Democratic hold			

=== District 18 ===
The 18th district covers southern Kent County and northern Sussex County, including the communities of Milford, Harrington, Greenwood, Ellendale, Houston, Farmington, Slaughter Beach, and Lincoln. First-term Republican incumbent Dave Wilson, who was elected in 2018 with 65.2% of the vote, won a second term.

Delaware Senate 18th district general election, 2022
Party	Candidate	Votes	%
Republican	Dave Wilson (incumbent)	10,867	69.97%
Democratic	Billy Devary	4,665	30.03%
Total votes		15,532	100%
Republican hold			

=== District 19 ===
The 19th district covers central Sussex County, including the communities of Georgetown, Bridgeville, and Long Neck. Third-term Republican incumbent Brian Pettyjohn, who was unopposed in 2020, won a fourth term unopposed.

Delaware Senate 19th district general election, 2022
Party	Candidate	Votes	%
Republican	Brian Pettyjohn (incumbent)	13,142	100%
Total votes		13,142	100%
Republican hold			

=== District 20 ===
The 20th district is based in southeastern Sussex County along the Atlantic Ocean, including the communities of Millsboro, Selbyville, Ocean View, Bethany Beach, Dagsboro, Frankford, Fenwick Island, Millville, South Bethany, Roxana, and Oak Orchard. Third-term Republican incumbent Gerald Hocker, who was unopposed in 2020, won a fourth term unopposed.

Delaware Senate 20th district general election, 2022
Party	Candidate	Votes	%
Republican	Gerald Hocker (incumbent)	17,150	100%
Total votes		17,150	100%
Republican hold			

=== District 21 ===
The 21st district is based in the southwestern corner of Sussex County, including the communities of Seaford, Laurel, Delmar, Bethel, Gumboro, and Reliance. Third-term Republican incumbent Bryant Richardson, who was elected in 2018 with 65.0% of the vote, won a fourth term.

Delaware Senate 21st district general election, 2022
Party	Candidate	Votes	%
Republican	Bryant Richardson (incumbent)	10,013	86.77%
Non-Partisan Delaware	Sonja Mehaffey	986	8.54%
Libertarian	Chris Dalton	541	4.69%
Total votes		11,540	100%
Republican hold			
