= 2012 Delaware Senate election =

- November 6, 2012

All 21 seats in the Delaware Senate 11 seats needed for a majority

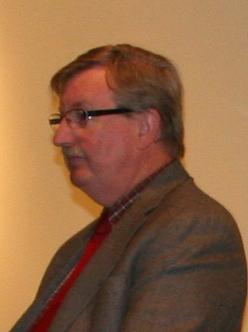
	Majority party	Minority party
Leader	Tony DeLuca (lost re-nomination)	Gary Simpson
Party	Democratic	Republican
Leader since	January 8, 2009	January 8, 2009
Leader's seat	11th – Brookside	18th – Milford
Last election	14	7
Seats before	14	7
Seats after	13	8
Seat change	▼1	▲1
Popular vote	225,241	127,505
Percentage	62.50%	35.38%
- Results: Democratic gain Republican gain Democratic hold Republican hold
President pro tempore before election
Tony DeLuca
Democratic
Elected President pro tempore
Patti Blevins
Democratic

The 2012 Delaware Senate election was held on November 6, 2012 to elect all 21 members of the Delaware Senate. The election coincided with the elections for other offices, including the Presidency, U.S. Senate, U.S. House of Representatives, Governor, and state house. The primary election was held on September 11, 2012.

== Overview ==
=== Open seats ===
District 6: Republican incumbent and Minority Whip Liane Sorenson is retiring.

District 20: Democratic incumbent George Bunting is retiring.

=== Results summary ===
District	Incumbent	Party	Elected Senator	Party
1	Harris McDowell III	Dem	Harris McDowell III	Dem
2	Margaret Rose Henry	Dem	Margaret Rose Henry	Dem
3	Robert Marshall	Dem	Robert Marshall	Dem
4	Michael Katz	Dem	Gregory Lavelle	Rep
4	Liane Sorenson (Note: Redistricted from the 6th district.)	Rep	Gregory Lavelle	Rep
5	Catherine Cloutier	Rep	Catherine Cloutier	Rep
6	New Seat		Ernesto Lopez	Rep
7	Patti Blevins	Dem	Patti Blevins	Dem
8	David Sokola	Dem	David Sokola	Dem
9	Karen Peterson	Dem	Karen Peterson	Dem
10	Bethany Hall-Long	Dem	Bethany Hall-Long	Dem
11	Tony DeLuca	Dem	Bryan Townsend	Dem
12	Dorinda Connor	Rep	Nicole Poore	Dem
13	David McBride	Dem	David McBride	Dem
14	Bruce Ennis	Dem	Bruce Ennis	Dem
15	David Lawson	Rep	David Lawson	Rep
16	Colin Bonini	Rep	Colin Bonini	Rep
17	Brian Bushweller	Dem	Brian Bushweller	Dem
18	Gary Simpson	Rep	Gary Simpson	Rep
19	Joseph Booth	Rep	Brian Pettyjohn	Rep
20	George Bunting	Dem	Gerald Hocker	Rep
21	Robert Venables Sr.	Dem	Robert Venables Sr.	Dem

Party	Candi- dates	Votes		Seats		
Party	Candi- dates	No.	%	No.	+/–	%
Democratic	19	225,241	62.50%	13	▼1	61.90%
Republican	13	127,505	35.38%	8	▲1	38.10%
Independent	3	4,734	1.31%	0	Steady	0.00
Libertarian	6	2,887	0.80%	0	Steady	0.00
Total	41	360,367	100%	21	Steady	100

Popular vote
Democratic	62.50%
Republican	35.38%
Independent	1.31%
Libertarian	0.80%

Senate seats
Democratic	61.90%
Republican	38.10%

== Predictions ==
Source	Ranking	As of
Governing	Safe D	October 24, 2012

== Detailed results ==
=== District 1 ===
Incumbent Democrat Harris McDowell III has represented the 1st district since 1977.

Delaware Senate 1st district Democratic primary election, 2012
Party	Candidate	Votes	%
Democratic	Harris McDowell III (incumbent)	2,342	52.24%
Democratic	David D. Brady	1,613	35.98%
Democratic	James Martin	528	11.78%
Total votes		4,483	100%

Delaware Senate 1st district general election, 2012
Party	Candidate	Votes	%
Democratic	Harris McDowell III (incumbent)	15,155	85.31%
Independent Party	Robert Clark	2,054	11.56%
Libertarian	Bryan Lintz	555	3.12%
Total votes		17,764	100%
Democratic hold			

=== District 2 ===
Incumbent Democrat Margaret Rose Henry has represented the 2nd district since 1994.

Delaware Senate 2nd district general election, 2012
Party	Candidate	Votes	%
Democratic	Margaret Rose Henry (incumbent)	15,197	100%
Total votes		15,197	100%
Democratic hold			

=== District 3 ===
Incumbent Democrat Robert Marshall has represented the 3rd district since 1979.

Delaware Senate 3rd district Democratic primary election, 2012
Party	Candidate	Votes	%
Democratic	Robert Marshall (incumbent)	2,504	62.21%
Democratic	Eric M. Anderson	912	22.66%
Democratic	Timothy J. Meades Sr.	609	15.13%
Total votes		4,025	100%

Delaware Senate 3rd district general election, 2012
Party	Candidate	Votes	%
Democratic	Robert Marshall (incumbent)	12,322	100%
Total votes		12,322	100%
Democratic hold			

=== District 4 ===
The new 4th district includes the homes of incumbent Democrat Michael Katz, who has represented the 4th district since 2009, and Republican Liane Sorenson, who has represented the 6th district since 1995. Sorenson didn't seek re-election. Katz lost re-election here to Republican Gregory Lavelle.

Delaware Senate 4th district general election, 2012
Party	Candidate	Votes	%
Republican	Gregory Lavelle	11,970	50.79%
Democratic	Michael Katz (incumbent)	11,188	47.47%
Libertarian	Marcia Groff	410	1.74%
Total votes		23,568	100%
Republican gain from Democratic			

=== District 5 ===
Incumbent Republican Catherine Cloutier has represented the 5th district since 2001.

Delaware Senate 5th district general election, 2012
Party	Candidate	Votes	%
Republican	Catherine Cloutier (incumbent)	12,912	56.20%
Democratic	Christopher R. Counihan	10,062	43.80%
Total votes		22,974	100%
Republican hold			

=== District 6 ===
The new 6th district is based in the Cape Region in costal Sussex County, and includes Rehoboth Beach, Lewes, and Milton. The district has no incumbent. Republican Ernesto Lopez won the open seat.

Delaware Senate 6th district Democratic primary election, 2012
Party	Candidate	Votes	%
Democratic	Andrew W. Staton	2,088	58.05%
Democratic	Robert G. Frederick	814	22.63%
Democratic	Micheal C. Miller Sr.	695	19.32%
Total votes		3,597	100%

Delaware Senate 6th district Republican primary election, 2012
Party	Candidate	Votes	%
Republican	Ernesto Lopez	2,163	54.87%
Republican	Glen Urquhart	1,779	45.13%
Total votes		3,942	100%

Delaware Senate 6th district general election, 2012
Party	Candidate	Votes	%
Republican	Ernesto Lopez	13,603	56.12%
Democratic	Andrew W. Staton	10,352	42.70%
Libertarian	Gwendolyn M. Jones	286	1.18%
Total votes		24,241	100%
Republican win (new seat)			

=== District 7 ===
Incumbent Democrat Patti Blevins has represented the 7th district since 1991.

Delaware Senate 7th district general election, 2012
Party	Candidate	Votes	%
Democratic	Patti Blevins (incumbent)	13,756	92.35%
Libertarian	James Christina	1,139	7.65%
Total votes		14,895	100%
Democratic hold			

=== District 8 ===
Incumbent Democrat David Sokola has represented the 8th district since 1991.

Delaware Senate 8th district general election, 2012
Party	Candidate	Votes	%
Democratic	David Sokola (incumbent)	10,099	60.71%
Republican	William Stritzinger	6,535	39.29%
Total votes		16,634	100%
Democratic hold			

=== District 9 ===
Incumbent Democrat Karen Peterson has represented the 9th district since 2003.

Delaware Senate 9th district general election, 2012
Party	Candidate	Votes	%
Democratic	Karen Peterson (incumbent)	13,941	100%
Total votes		13,941	100%
Democratic hold			

=== District 10 ===
Incumbent Democrat Bethany Hall-Long has represented the 10th district since 2009.

Delaware Senate 10th district general election, 2012
Party	Candidate	Votes	%
Democratic	Bethany Hall-Long (incumbent)	16,498	100%
Total votes		16,498	100%
Democratic hold			

=== District 11 ===
Incumbent Democratic President pro tempore Tony DeLuca has represented the 11th district since 1999. DeLuca lost re-nomination to fellow Democrat Bryan Townsend. Townsend won the general election.

Delaware Senate 11th district Democratic primary election, 2012
Party	Candidate	Votes	%
Democratic	Bryan Townsend	1,441	57.76%
Democratic	Tony DeLuca (incumbent)	1,054	42.24%
Total votes		2,495	100%

Delaware Senate 11th district general election, 2012
Party	Candidate	Votes	%
Democratic	Bryan Townsend	12,860	78.37%
Republican	Evan Queitsch	3,550	21.63%
Total votes		16,410	100%
Democratic hold			

=== District 12 ===
Incumbent Republican Dorinda Connor has represented the 12th district since 1997. Connor lost re-election to Democrat Nicole Poore.

Delaware Senate 12th district general election, 2012
Party	Candidate	Votes	%
Democratic	Nicole Poore	12,875	60.29%
Republican	Dorinda Connor (incumbent)	8,170	38.26%
Libertarian	Brad Thomas	310	1.45%
Total votes		21,355	100%
Democratic gain from Republican			

=== District 13 ===
Incumbent Democratic Majority Leader David McBride has represented the 13th district since 1979.

Delaware Senate 13th district general election, 2012
Party	Candidate	Votes	%
Democratic	David McBride (incumbent)	14,444	100%
Total votes		14,444	100%
Democratic hold			

=== District 14 ===
Incumbent Democrat Bruce Ennis has represented the 14th district since 2007.

Delaware Senate 14th district general election, 2012
Party	Candidate	Votes	%
Democratic	Bruce Ennis (incumbent)	12,031	61.12%
Republican	Scott Unruh	7,652	38.88%
Total votes		19,683	100%
Democratic hold			

=== District 15 ===
Incumbent Republican David Lawson has represented the 15th district since 2011.

Delaware Senate 15th district general election, 2012
Party	Candidate	Votes	%
Republican	David Lawson (incumbent)	9,547	50.58%
Democratic	Kathleen Cooke	9,004	47.70%
Independent Party	Catherine Samardza	324	1.72%
Total votes		18,875	100%
Republican hold			

=== District 16 ===
Incumbent Republican Colin Bonini has represented the 16th district since 1995.

Delaware Senate 16th district general election, 2012
Party	Candidate	Votes	%
Republican	Colin Bonini (incumbent)	9,372	79.91%
Independent Party	Michael Tedesco	2,356	20.09%
Total votes		11,728	100%
Republican hold			

=== District 17 ===
Incumbent Democrat Brian Bushweller has represented the 17th district since 2009.

Delaware Senate 17th district general election, 2012
Party	Candidate	Votes	%
Democratic	Brian Bushweller (incumbent)	13,161	100%
Total votes		13,161	100%
Democratic hold			

=== District 18 ===
Incumbent Republican Minority Leader Gary Simpson has represented the 18th district since 1999.

Delaware Senate 18th district Republican primary election, 2012
Party	Candidate	Votes	%
Republican	Gary Simpson (incumbent)	1,515	68.03%
Republican	Matthew A. Opaliski	712	31.97%
Total votes		2,227	100%

Delaware Senate 18th district general election, 2012
Party	Candidate	Votes	%
Republican	Gary Simpson (incumbent)	13,198	100%
Total votes		13,198	100%
Republican hold			

=== District 19 ===
Incumbent Republican Joseph Booth has represented the 19th district since 2009. Booth lost re-nomination to fellow Republican Eric Bodenweiser. Bodenweiser later withdrew from the general election and was replaced on the ballot by Brian Pettyjohn. Pettyjohn won the general election.

Delaware Senate 19th district Republican primary election, 2012
Party	Candidate	Votes	%
Republican	Eric Bodenweiser	1,736	52.75%
Republican	Joseph Booth (incumbent)	1,555	47.25%
Total votes		3,291	100%

Delaware Senate 19th district general election, 2012
Party	Candidate	Votes	%
Republican	Brian Pettyjohn (Note: Replacement for Eric Bodenweiser.)	9,817	59.78%
Democratic	Jane E. Hovington	6,605	40.22%
Total votes		16,422	100%
Republican hold			

=== District 20 ===
Incumbent Democrat George Bunting has represented the 20th district since 1997. Bunting retired and Republican Gerald Hocker won the open seat.

Delaware Senate 20th district general election, 2012
Party	Candidate	Votes	%
Republican	Gerald Hocker	14,290	67.96%
Democratic	Richard Eakle	6,736	32.04%
Total votes		21,026	100%
Republican gain from Democratic			

=== District 21 ===
Incumbent Democrat Robert Venables Sr. has represented the 21st district since 1989.

Delaware Senate 21st district general election, 2012
Party	Candidate	Votes	%
Democratic	Robert Venables Sr. (incumbent)	8,955	55.86%
Republican	Bryant Richardson	6,889	42.97%
Libertarian	John F. Potter	187	1.17%
Total votes		16,031	100%
Democratic hold			
