= 2024 Delaware Senate election =

- November 5, 2024

10 of the 21 seats in the Delaware Senate 11 seats needed for a majority

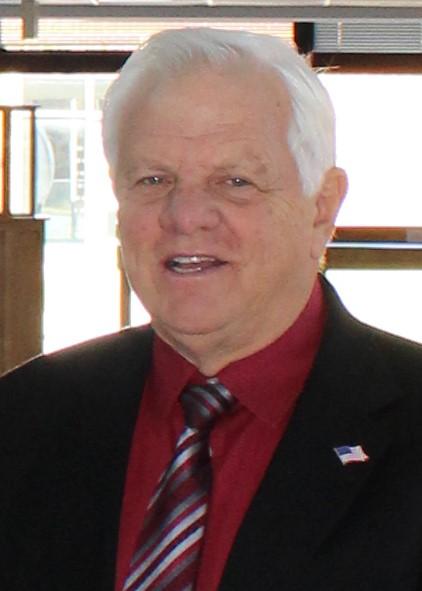
	Majority party	Minority party
Leader	David Sokola	Gerald Hocker
Party	Democratic	Republican
Leader since	November 4, 2020	November 7, 2018
Leader's seat	8th - Newark	20th - Ocean View
Last election	15	6
Seats won	15	6
Seat change	Steady	Steady
Popular vote	115,338	69,818
Percentage	62.23%	37.67%
Swing	▲10.05%	▼10.15%
- Results: Democratic hold Republican hold No election
President pro tempore before election
David Sokola
Democratic
Elected President pro tempore
David Sokola
Democratic

The 2024 Delaware Senate election was held on November 5, 2024, alongside the 2024 United States elections.

== Background ==
State primaries were scheduled for September 10.

=== Predictions ===
Source	Ranking	As of
Sabato's Crystal Ball	Safe D	October 23, 2024

== Results summary ==
District	Incumbent	Party	Elected	Party
2nd	Darius J. Brown	Dem	Darius J. Brown	Dem
3rd	Elizabeth Lockman	Dem	Elizabeth Lockman	Dem
4th	Laura Sturgeon	Dem	Laura Sturgeon	Dem
6th	Russ Huxtable	Dem	Russ Huxtable	Dem
10th	Stephanie Hansen	Dem	Stephanie Hansen	Dem
11th	Bryan Townsend	Dem	Bryan Townsend	Dem
16th	Eric Buckson	Rep	Eric Buckson	Rep
17th	W. Charles Paradee	Dem	W. Charles Paradee	Dem
18th	David L. Wilson	Rep	David L. Wilson	Rep
21st	Bryant Richardson	Rep	Bryant Richardson	Rep

=== Statewide ===
Party	Candi- dates	Votes	%	Seats	+/–
Democratic	7	115,338	62.23%	7	Steady
Republican	5	69,818	37.67%	3	Steady
Non-Partisan Delaware	1	181	0.10%	0	Steady
Total	13	185,337	100%	10	Steady

=== Closest races ===
Seats where the margin of victory was under 10%:

1. District 6, 8.70%

== Results ==
=== Delaware's 2nd Senate district ===
Delaware Senate 2nd district general election, 2024
Party	Candidate	Votes	%
Democratic	Darius J. Brown (incumbent)	14,273	92.97
Republican	Jon Roe	1,080	7.03%
Total votes		15,353	100%
Democratic hold			

=== Delaware's 3rd Senate district ===
Delaware Senate 3rd district general election, 2024
Party	Candidate	Votes	%
Democratic	Elizabeth Lockman (incumbent)	11,831	100%
Total votes		11,831	100%
Democratic hold			

=== Delaware's 4th Senate district ===
Delaware Senate 4th district general election, 2024
Party	Candidate	Votes	%
Democratic	Laura Sturgeon (incumbent)	18,984	100%
Total votes		18,984	100%
Democratic hold			

=== Delaware's 6th Senate district ===
Delaware Senate 6th district general election, 2024
Party	Candidate	Votes	%
Democratic	Russ Huxtable (incumbent)	20,212	54.35%
Republican	Kim Stevenson	16,976	45.65%
Total votes		37,188	100%
Democratic hold			

=== Delaware's 10th Senate district ===
Delaware Senate 10th district general election, 2024
Party	Candidate	Votes	%
Democratic	Stephanie Hansen (incumbent)	19,510	100%
Total votes		19,510	100%
Democratic hold			

=== Delaware's 11th Senate district ===
Delaware Senate 11th district general election, 2024
Party	Candidate	Votes	%
Democratic	Bryan Townsend (incumbent)	15,898	100%
Total votes		15,898	100%
Democratic hold			

=== Delaware's 16th Senate district ===
Delaware Senate 16th district general election, 2024
Party	Candidate	Votes	%
Republican	Eric Buckson (incumbent)	16,094	98.89%
Non-Partisan Delaware	Will McVay	181	1.11%
Total votes		16,275	100%
Republican hold			

=== Delaware's 17th Senate district ===
Delaware Senate 17th district general election, 2024
Party	Candidate	Votes	%
Democratic	W. Charles Paradee (incumbent)	14,630	100%
Total votes		14,630	100%
Democratic hold			

=== Delaware's 18th Senate district ===
Delaware Senate 10th district general election, 2024
Party	Candidate	Votes	%
Republican	David L. Wilson (incumbent)	18,563	100%
Total votes		18,563	100%
Republican hold			

=== Delaware's 21st Senate district ===
Delaware Senate 10th district general election, 2024
Party	Candidate	Votes	%
Republican	Bryant Richardson (incumbent)	17,105	100%
Total votes		17,105	100%
Republican hold			
