= 2018 Delaware Senate election =

- November 6, 2018

10 of the 21 seats in the Delaware State Senate 11 seats needed for a majority
- Turnout: 52.20%
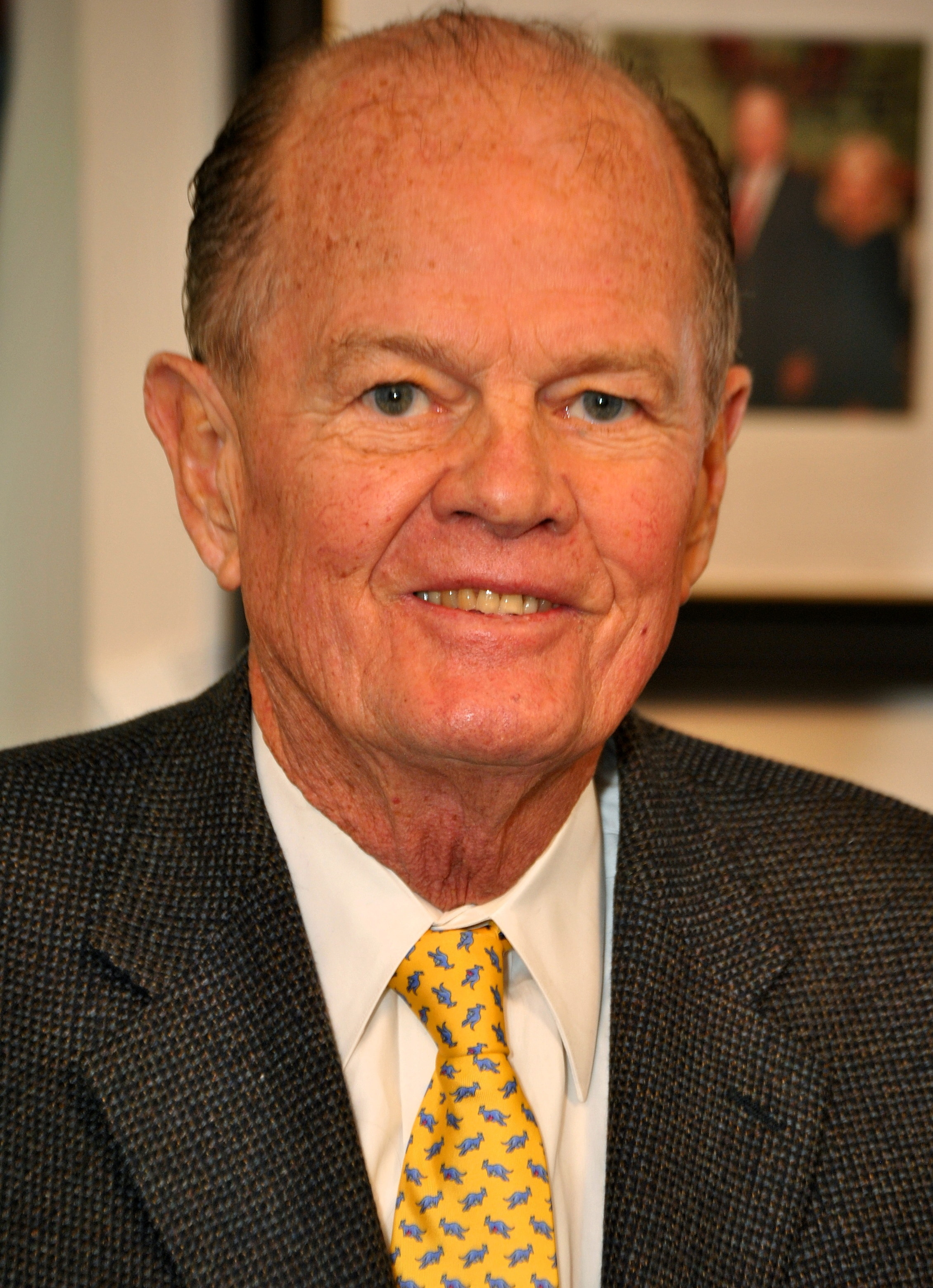

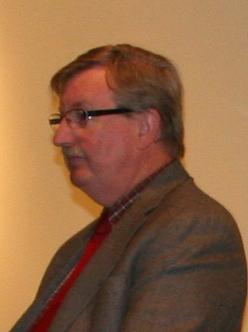
| | Majority party | Minority party |
|---|---|---|
| Leader | David McBride | Gary Simpson (retired) |
| Party | Democratic | Republican |
| Leader since | January 17, 2017 | January 8, 2009 |
| Leader's seat | 13th - New Castle | 18th - Milford |
| Last election | 11 | 10 |
| Seats before | 11 | 10 |
| Seats won | 6 | 4 |
| Seats after | 12 | 9 |
| Seat change | ▲1 | ▼1 |
| Popular vote | 94,396 | 68,613 |
| Percentage | 57.91% | 42.09% |
- Results: Democratic gain Democratic hold Republican hold No election
President pro tempore before election
David McBride
Democratic
Elected President pro tempore
David McBride
Democratic

The 2018 Delaware Senate election was held on November 6, 2018, to elect 10 of the 21 members to Delaware's State Senate. The election coincided with the elections for other offices, including U.S. Senate, U.S. House of Representatives, and state house. The primary election was held on September 6, 2018.

Delaware Republicans needed to have a net gain of one seat to flip the chamber from the Democrats, however, Democrats increased their majority in the Senate by gaining one seat (winning 12 seats, compared to nine seats for the Republicans).

== Results summary ==
| District | Incumbent | Party | Elected Senator | Party |
|---|---|---|---|---|
| 2 | Margaret Rose Henry | Dem | Darius Brown | Dem |
| 3 | Robert Marshall | Dem | Elizabeth Lockman | Dem |
| 4 | Gregory Lavelle | Rep | Laura Sturgeon | Dem |
| 6 | Ernesto Lopez | Rep | Ernesto Lopez | Rep |
| 10 | Stephanie Hansen | Dem | Stephanie Hansen | Dem |
| 11 | Bryan Townsend | Dem | Bryan Townsend | Dem |
| 16 | Colin Bonini | Rep | Colin Bonini | Rep |
| 17 | Brian Bushweller | Dem | Charles Paradee | Dem |
| 18 | Gary Simpson | Rep | David Wilson | Rep |
| 21 | Bryant Richardson | Rep | Bryant Richardson | Rep |

| Party | Candi- dates | Votes | | Seats | | |
| Party | Candi- dates | No. | % | No. | +/– | % |
|---|---|---|---|---|---|---|
| Democratic | 10 | 94,396 | 57.91% | 12 | ▲1 | 57.14% |
| Republican | 8 | 68,613 | 42.09% | 9 | ▼1 | 42.86% |
| Total | 18 | 163,009 | 100% | 21 | Steady | 100% |

Popular vote
| Democratic | 57.91% |
| Republican | 42.09% |

Senate seats
| Democratic | 57.14% |
| Republican | 42.86% |

== Predictions ==
| Source | Ranking | As of |
|---|---|---|
| Governing | Lean D | October 8, 2018 |

== Detailed results ==
=== District 2 ===
Incumbent Democratic Majority Leader Margaret Rose Henry had represented the 2nd district since 1994. Henry retired, and fellow Democrat Darius Brown won the open seat.

Delaware Senate 2nd district Democratic primary election, 2018
| Party | Candidate | Votes | % |
|---|---|---|---|
| Democratic | Darius Brown | 2,115 | 38.39% |
| Democratic | Bobbie Cummings | 1,387 | 25.17% |
| Democratic | Samuel L. Guy | 1,280 | 23.23% |
| Democratic | Herman M. Holloway Jr. | 727 | 13.21% |
| Total votes | | 5,509 | 100% |

Delaware Senate 2nd district general election, 2018
| Party | Candidate | Votes | % |
|---|---|---|---|
| Democratic | Darius Brown | 11,783 | 100% |
| Total votes | | 11,783 | 100% |
| Democratic hold | | | |

=== District 3 ===
Incumbent Democrat Robert Marshall had represented the 3rd district since 1979. Marshall retired, and fellow Democrat Elizabeth Lockman won the open seat.

Delaware Senate 3rd district Democratic primary election, 2018
| Party | Candidate | Votes | % |
|---|---|---|---|
| Democratic | Elizabeth Lockman | 2,143 | 56.36% |
| Democratic | Jordan Hines | 1,660 | 43.64% |
| Total votes | | 3,803 | 100% |

Delaware Senate 3rd district general election, 2018
| Party | Candidate | Votes | % |
|---|---|---|---|
| Democratic | Elizabeth Lockman | 9,099 | 100% |
| Total votes | | 9,099 | 100% |
| Democratic hold | | | |

=== District 4 ===
Incumbent Republican Gregory Lavelle had represented the 4th district since 2013. Lavelle lost re-election to Democrat Laura Sturgeon.

Delaware Senate 4th district general election, 2018
| Party | Candidate | Votes | % |
|---|---|---|---|
| Democratic | Laura Sturgeon | 11,251 | 53.13% |
| Republican | Gregory Lavelle (incumbent) | 9,924 | 46.87% |
| Total votes | | 21,175 | 100% |
| Democratic gain from Republican | | | |

=== District 6 ===
Incumbent Republican Ernesto Lopez had represented the 6th district since 2013.

Delaware Senate 6th district general election, 2018
| Party | Candidate | Votes | % |
|---|---|---|---|
| Republican | Ernesto Lopez (incumbent) | 14,781 | 52.67% |
| Democratic | David B. Baker | 13,283 | 47.33% |
| Total votes | | 28,064 | 100% |
| Republican hold | | | |

=== District 10 ===
Incumbent Democrat Stephanie Hansen had represented the 10th district since 2017.

Delaware Senate 10th district general election, 2018
| Party | Candidate | Votes | % |
|---|---|---|---|
| Democratic | Stephanie Hansen (incumbent) | 11,665 | 62.06% |
| Republican | Christine Metzing | 7,129 | 37.94% |
| Total votes | | 18,794 | 100% |
| Democratic hold | | | |

=== District 11 ===
Incumbent Democrat Bryan Townsend had represented the 11th district since 2013.

Delaware Senate 11th district general election, 2018
| Party | Candidate | Votes | % |
|---|---|---|---|
| Democratic | Bryan Townsend (incumbent) | 10,421 | 75.75% |
| Republican | Daniel Kapitanic | 3,335 | 24.25% |
| Total votes | | 13,756 | 100% |
| Democratic hold | | | |

=== District 16 ===
Incumbent Republican Colin Bonini had represented the 16th district since 1995.

Delaware Senate 16th district general election, 2018
| Party | Candidate | Votes | % |
|---|---|---|---|
| Republican | Colin Bonini (incumbent) | 8,618 | 55.09% |
| Democratic | Louisa Phillips | 7,027 | 44.91% |
| Total votes | | 15,645 | 100% |
| Republican hold | | | |

=== District 17 ===
Incumbent Democrat Brian Bushweller had represented the 17th district since 2009. Bushweller retired, and fellow Democrat Charles Paradee won the open seat.

Delaware Senate 17th district Republican primary election, 2018
| Party | Candidate | Votes | % |
|---|---|---|---|
| Republican | Justin King | 1,240 | 67.54% |
| Republican | Donyale Hall | 596 | 32.46% |
| Total votes | | 1,836 | 100% |

Delaware Senate 17th district general election, 2018
| Party | Candidate | Votes | % |
|---|---|---|---|
| Democratic | Charles Paradee | 9,343 | 64.27% |
| Republican | Justin King | 5,194 | 35.73% |
| Total votes | | 14,537 | 100% |
| Democratic hold | | | |

=== District 18 ===
Incumbent Republican Minority Leader Gary Simpson had represented the 18th district since 1999. Simpson retired, and fellow Republican David Wilson won the open seat.

Delaware Senate 18th district general election, 2018
| Party | Candidate | Votes | % |
|---|---|---|---|
| Republican | David Wilson | 10,816 | 65.17% |
| Democratic | James A. Purcell | 5,783 | 34.83% |
| Total votes | | 16,599 | 100% |
| Republican hold | | | |

=== District 21 ===
Incumbent Republican Bryant Richardson had represented the 21st district since 2015.

Delaware Senate 21st district general election, 2018
| Party | Candidate | Votes | % |
|---|---|---|---|
| Republican | Bryant Richardson (incumbent) | 8,816 | 65.03% |
| Democratic | Robert C. Wheatley | 4,741 | 34.97% |
| Total votes | | 13,557 | 100% |
| Republican hold | | | |
