= 145th Delaware General Assembly =

American legislative session

←	144th	146th	→

Overview
- Legislative body: Delaware General Assembly
- Term: January 6, 2009 – January 5, 2011

The 145th Delaware General Assembly was a meeting of the legislative branch of the state government, consisting of the Delaware Senate and the Delaware House of Representatives. Elections were held the first Tuesday after November 1 and terms began in Dover on the first Tuesday in January. This date was January 6, 2009, which was two weeks before the beginning of the first administrative year of Democratic Governor Jack Markell from New Castle County and Democratic Lieutenant Governor Matthew Denn, also from New Castle County.

Currently the distribution of seats for both houses was based on the interpretation of the federal 2000 census. It resulted from a large number of memberships in the New Castle County area and ruling that the election districts would abandon county lines for their boundaries, but would design whatever district boundaries that would accomplish such population equals.

In the 145th Delaware General Assembly session both chambers had a Democratic majority.

== Party summary ==
Senate

- Democratic (D): 15 (majority)
- Republican (R): 6

Total members: 21

House of Representatives

- Democratic (D): 25 (majority)
- Republican (R): 16

Total members: 41

== Leadership ==
Senate

- Lieutenant Governor (President of the Senate):
  - Matthew Denn, Democratic of New Castle County.
- President pro tempore of the Senate:
  - Anthony J. DeLuca, Democratic of New Castle County.

House of Representatives

- Speaker of the House
  - Robert F. Gilligan, Democratic of New Castle County.

== Party leadership ==
Senate

- Majority Leader: Patricia Blevins, Democratic
- Majority Whip: Margaret Rose Henry, Democratic
- Minority Leader: F. Gary Simpson, Republican
- Minority Whip: Liane M. Sorenson, Republican

House of Representatives

- Majority Leader: Peter C. Schwartzkopf, Democratic
- Majority Whip: Valerie J. Longhurst, Democratic
- Minority Leader: Richard C. Cathcart, Republican
- Minority Whip: Daniel B. Short, Republican

== Members ==
=== Senate ===
About half the State Senators were elected every two years for a four-year term, except the decade district redesign year, when all served two years. They were designed for equal populations from all districts and its accomplishment occasionally included some territory from two counties.

New Castle County

- 1: Harris McDowell III (D)
- 2: Margaret Rose Henry (D)
- 3: Robert I. Marshall (D)
- 4: Michael S. Katz (D)
- 5: Catherine Cloutier (R)
- 6: Liane M. Sorenson (R)

New Castle County

- 7: Patricia Blevins (D)
- 8: David Sokola (D)
- 9: Karen E. Peterson (D)
- 10: Bethany Hall-Long (D)
- 11: Anthony J. DeLuca (D)
- 12: Dorinda A. Connor (R)
- 13: David McBride (D)

Kent County

- 14: Bruce Ennis (D)
- 15: Nancy W. Cook (D)
- 16: Colin Bonini (R)
- 17: Brian Bushweller (D)

Sussex County

- 18: F. Gary Simpson (R)
- 19: Thurman Adams Jr. (D)
  - Joseph W. Booth (R)
- 20: George H. Bunting Jr. (D)
- 21: Robert Venables Sr. (D)

=== House of Representatives ===
All the State Representatives were elected every two years for a two-year term. They were designed for equal populations from all districts and its accomplishment occasionally included some territory from two counties.

New Castle County

- 1: Dennis P. Williams (D)
- 2: Hazel D. Plant (D)
- 3: Helene M. Keeley (D)
- 4: Gerald L. Brady (D)
- 5: Melanie George Marshall (D)
- 6: Diana M. McWilliams (D)
- 7: Bryon H. Short (D)
- 8: S. Quinton Johnson IV (D)
- 9: Richard C. Cathcart (R)
- 10: Dennis E. Williams (D)
- 11: Gregory F. Lavelle (R)
- 12: Deborah D. Hudson (R)
- 13: John L. Mitchell (D)
- 14: Peter C. Schwartzkopf (D)

New Castle County

- 15: Valerie J. Longhurst (D)
- 16: James Johnson (D)
- 17: Michael P. Mulrooney (D)
- 18: Michael A. Barbieri (D)
- 19: Robert F. Gilligan (D)
- 20: Nick T. Manolakos (R)
- 21: Michael Ramone (R)
- 22: Joseph E. Miro (R)
- 23: Teresa L. Schooley (D)
- 24: William A. Oberle Jr. (R)
- 25: John A. Kowalko Jr. (D)
- 26: John J. Viola (D)
- 27: Earl Jaques (D)

Kent County

- 28: William J. Carson (D)
- 29: Pamela J. Thornburg (R)
- 30: William R. Outten (R)
- 31: Darryl M. Scott (D)
- 32: E. Bradford Bennett (D)
- 33: Robert E. Walls (D)
- 34: Donald A. Blakey (R)

Sussex County

- 35: David L. Wilson (R)
- 36: V. George Carey (R)
- 37: Ruth Briggs King (R)
- 38: Gerald W. Hocker (R)
- 39: Daniel B. Short (R)
- 40: Clifford G. "Biff" Lee (R)
- 41: John C. Atkins (D)

== Places with more information ==
- Delaware Historical Society; website; 505 North Market Street, Wilmington, Delaware 19801; (302) 655-7161.
- University of Delaware; Library website; 181 South College Avenue, Newark, Delaware 19717; (302) 831-2965.
