= Delaware's 5th Senate district =

American legislative district

Delaware's 5th State Senate district
Senator
Ray Seigfried; D–Arden
- Registration: 45.1% Democratic; 29.3% Republican; 25.6% No party preference
- Demographics: 81% White; 8% Black; 2% Hispanic; 7% Asian; 1% Other
- Population (2018): 41,850
- Registered voters: 34,684

Delaware's 5th Senate district is one of 21 districts in the Delaware Senate. It has been represented by Democrat Ray Seigfried since 2025, succeeding Democrat Kyle Evans Gay who resigned to take office as lieutenant governor of Delaware.

== Geography ==
District 5 covers the northern suburbs of Wilmington in New Castle County including Arden, Ardencroft, Ardentown, Windsor Hills, Naamans Manor, Wilmont, Talleys Corner, Afton, Shellburne, Windybush, Heatherbrooke, Chalfonte, and other unincorporated areas.

Like all districts in the state, the 5th Senate district is located entirely within Delaware's at-large congressional district. It overlaps with the 6th, 7th, 10th, and 12th districts of the Delaware House of Representatives. The district also borders Pennsylvania along the Twelve-Mile Circle.

== Recent election results ==
Delaware Senators are elected to staggered four-year terms. Under normal circumstances, the 5th district holds elections in presidential years, except immediately after redistricting, when all seats are up for election regardless of usual cycle.

=== 2020 ===
2020 Delaware Senate election, District 5
Primary election
Party	Candidate	Votes	%
Democratic	Kyle Evans Gay	3,852	56.6
Democratic	Denise Bowers	1,842	27.1
Democratic	Eric Levin	1,112	16.3
Total votes		6,806	100
General election
Democratic	Kyle Evans Gay	13,475	52.3
Republican	Catherine Cloutier (incumbent)	12,283	47.7
Total votes		25,758	100
Democratic gain from Republican			

=== 2016 ===
2016 Delaware Senate election, District 5
Party	Candidate	Votes	%
Republican	Catherine Cloutier (incumbent)	14,083	59.5
Democratic	Denise Bowers	9,596	40.5
Total votes		23,679	100
Republican hold			

=== 2012 ===
2012 Delaware Senate election, District 5
Primary election
Party	Candidate	Votes	%
Republican	Catherine Cloutier (incumbent)	12,912	56.2
Democratic	Christopher Counihan	10,062	43.8
Total votes		22,974	100
Republican hold			

=== Federal and statewide results ===
Year	Office	Results
2020	President	Biden 64.6 – 33.9%
2016	President	Clinton 57.7 – 36.9%
2014	Senate	Coons 59.9 – 37.8%
2012	President	Obama 57.5 – 40.9%
2012	Senate	Carper 66.6 – 29.5%
2012	Governor	Markell 70.6 – 27.6%
