= Russ Huxtable =

American politician

Member of the Delaware Senate from the 6th district 6th (2022-2024) district
- Incumbent
- Assumed office November 9, 2022
- Preceded by: Ernesto Lopez

Personal details
- Born: Delaware
- Party: Democratic
- Education: University of Delaware

Russell "Russ" Huxtable is an American politician from the Delaware Democratic Party. He represents the 6th district in the Delaware State Senate from 2022 to present. He was re-elected to the 6th district in 2024.

== Biography ==
As a student, Huxtable volunteered with the Appalachia Service Project. He has spent much of his career focused on affordable housing, working with various nonprofit groups in Delaware. He has served on the Delaware Governor’s Council on Housing and the Federal Home Loan Bank of Pittsburgh’s Affordable Housing Advisory Council.

Huxtable earned a bachelor’s degree in political science and government from the University of Delaware.

== Electoral history ==
- 2022: Huxtable defeated John “Jack” Bucchioni in the Democratic Primary held on September 13, 2022. He went on to win the General Election held on November 8, 2022, with 14,131 votes (51.48%).
- 2024: Huxtable defeated Republican nominee Kim Hoey Stevenson in the General Election held on November 5, 2024, with 20,212 votes (54.35%).
