= Dan Cruce =

American politician

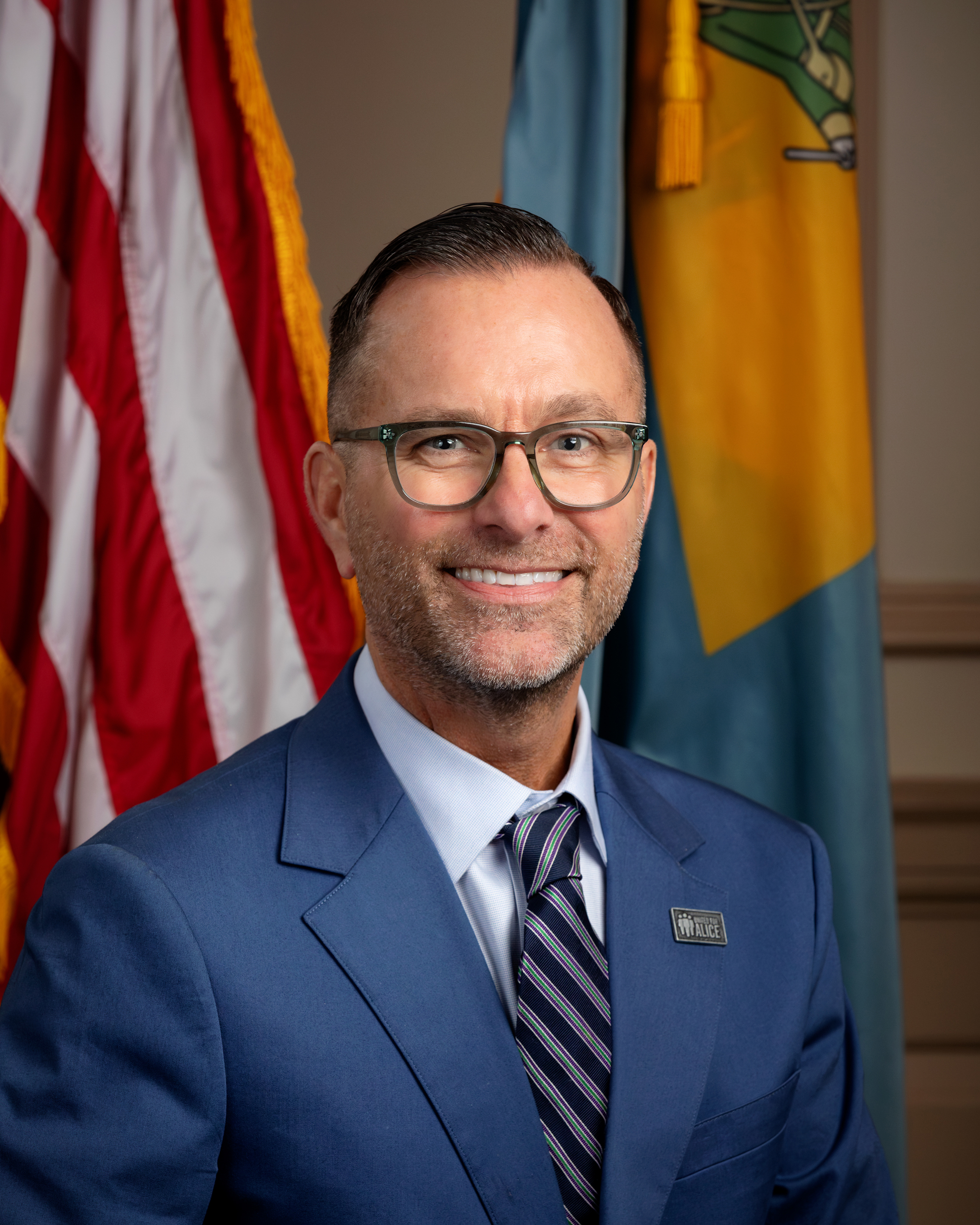
- Cruce in 2025

Member of the Delaware Senate from the 1st district
- Incumbent
- Assumed office February 16, 2025
- Preceded by: Sarah McBride

Personal details
- Party: Democratic
- Education: James Madison University (BA); Delaware Law School (JD)

Dan Cruce is an American nonprofit executive and politician serving as a member of the Delaware Senate from the 1st district since 2025. A Democrat, Cruce won a special election to fill the vacancy caused by Sarah McBride's resignation to join the U.S. House of Representatives.

== Early life and education ==
Cruce graduated from James Madison University with a bachelor of arts in international affairs and from Delaware Law School with a Juris Doctor.

== Career ==
Cruce is also the Chief Operating Officer of United Way Delaware. He previously worked as the Deputy Secretary/Chief of Staff of the Delaware Department of Education and as the Assistant Superintendent/Chief of Staff at the Christina School District.

Cruce clerked for Circuit Judge Kent A. Jordan and also worked as an Associate General Counsel for the Corporation Service Company. He also worked for Joe Biden, at the time a U.S. Senator. Cruce serves as Board Chair Emeritus of Humane Animal Partners and is the former Board Chair of the Delaware Theatre Company, Delaware Arts Alliance, and Delaware Arts Consortium. Cruce serves on the Executive Committee of the Delaware Community Foundation's Board of Directors.

== Delaware State Senate ==
Following Sarah McBride's resignation from the Delaware State Senate after being elected to the United States House of Representatives, Cruce was selected by the Delaware Democratic Party as their candidate in a 2025 special election to fill the vacancy in the 1st district. Cruce won the special election, defeating Republican candidate Steven Washington and nonpartisan Riley Figliola. He officially took office on February 16, 2025, and was sworn in on March 11, 2025.

== Legislation ==
In 2025, Cruce introduced legislation to update Delaware's Right to Representation statute. He sponsored a concurrent resolution directing the Delaware Department of Health and Social Services to examine benefits cliffs as they relate to asset-limited, income-constrained, employed (ALICE) individuals.

== Electoral history ==
2025 Delaware Senate District 1 special election
Party	Candidate	Votes	%
Democratic	Dan Cruce	3,654	76.94%
Republican	Steven Washington	990	20.85%
Nonpartisan	Riley "Liv" Figliola	88	1.85%
Write-in		10	0.36%
Total votes		4,749	100.00%

== Personal life ==
Cruce is gay. He is the first openly gay man to be elected to the Delaware State Senate.
