= Liane M. Sorenson =

American politician

Member of the Delaware Senate from the 6th district
- In office November 9, 1994 – November 6, 2012
- Preceded by: Andrew G. Knox
- Succeeded by: Gregory Lavelle (Redistricting)

Member of the Delaware House of Representatives from the 12th district
- In office November 4, 1992 – November 9, 1994
- Preceded by: Philip J. Corrozi
- Succeeded by: Deborah Hudson

Personal details
- Born: August 13, 1947 (age 78) Chicago, Illinois
- Party: Republican

Liane M. Sorenson (born August 13, 1947) is an American politician who served in the Delaware House of Representatives from the 12th district from 1992 to 1994 and in the Delaware Senate from the 6th district from 1994 to 2012. She was a Republican, lived in Hockessin, and represented New Castle County.

Delaware House of Representatives
Preceded by Philip J. Corrozi	Member of the Delaware House of Representatives from the 12th district 1992-1994	Succeeded by Deborah Hudson
Delaware Senate
Preceded by Andrew G. Knox	Member of the Delaware Senate from the 6th district 1994-2012	Succeeded by Ernesto Lopez
