= Delaware's 14th Senate district =

American legislative district

Delaware's 14th State Senate district
Senator
Kyra Hoffner; D–Dover
- Registration: 47.1% Democratic; 27.3% Republican; 25.6% No party preference
- Demographics: 67% White; 24% Black; 5% Hispanic; 1% Asian; 2% Other
- Population (2018): 51,166
- Registered voters: 35,734

Delaware's 14th Senate district is one of 21 districts in the Delaware Senate. It has been represented by Democrat Kyra Hoffner since 2023.

== Geography ==
District 14 straddles the border between New Castle County and Kent County, covering all of Smyrna, Clayton, Odessa, Blackbird, and Leipsic, as well as parts of Middletown.

Like all districts in the state, the 14th Senate district is located entirely within Delaware's at-large congressional district. It overlaps with the 8th, 9th, 11th, 28th, and 29th districts of the Delaware House of Representatives. The district borders Maryland to the west and New Jersey along the Delaware River.

== Recent election results ==
Delaware Senators are elected to staggered four-year terms. Under normal circumstances, the 14th district holds elections in presidential years, except immediately after redistricting, when all seats are up for election regardless of usual cycle.

=== 2020 ===
2020 Delaware Senate election, District 14
Primary election
Party	Candidate	Votes	%
Democratic	Bruce Ennis (incumbent)	3,333	53.5
Democratic	Kyra Hoffner	1,537	24.7
Democratic	Terrell Williams	1,360	21.8
Total votes		6,230	100
General election
Democratic	Bruce Ennis (incumbent)	16,492	59.5
Republican	Craig Pugh	11,229	40.5
Total votes		27,721	100
Democratic hold			

=== 2016 ===
2016 Delaware Senate election, District 14
Party	Candidate	Votes	%
Democratic	Bruce Ennis (incumbent)	13,454	59.6
Republican	Carl Pace	9,138	40.4
Total votes		22,592	100
Democratic hold			

=== 2012 ===
2012 Delaware Senate election, District 14
Party	Candidate	Votes	%
Democratic	Bruce Ennis (incumbent)	12,031	61.1
Republican	Scott Unruh	7,652	38.9
Total votes		19,683	100
Democratic hold			

=== Federal and statewide results ===
Year	Office	Results
2020	President	Biden 55.3 – 43.1%
2016	President	Clinton 48.5 – 46.3%
2014	Senate	Coons 52.8 – 45.4%
2012	President	Obama 56.4 – 42.2%
2012	Senate	Carper 65.5 – 30.9%
2012	Governor	Markell 67.5 – 30.3%
