= Kyra Hoffner =

American politician

Member of the Delaware Senate from the 14th district
- Incumbent
- Assumed office November 9, 2022
- Preceded by: Bruce Ennis

Personal details
- Born: New York City, New York, U.S.
- Party: Democratic
- Education: Patchogue-Medford High School

Kyra Hoffner is an American politician from the Delaware Democratic Party. She has represented the 14th district in the Delaware State Senate since 2022.

Hoffner is a Long Island native and lived there until moving to Delaware in 2001. She previously worked in the mortgage industry before retiring in 2008 and pursuing a career in advocacy. She lobbied for the League of Women Voters and co-chaired the organization's People Powered Fair Maps Redistricting Team.

Hoffner currently chairs the Senate Legislative Oversight and Sunset Committee and the Senate Corrections and Public Safety Committee. She is vice chair of the Senate Agriculture Committee.

== Legislation ==
Hoffner has sponsored various pieces of legislation to modernize Delaware's corrections system and provide relief to exonerated individuals. In 2024, she introduced legislation providing financial compensation to those who served time for wrongful convictions.

== Electoral history ==
2022: Hoffner won a five-way Democratic Primary with 1,015 votes (34.37%) on September 13, 2022. She went on to defeat Republican nominee Mark Pugh with 8,404 votes (51.83%) in the General Election.
