= Delaware's 9th Senate district =

American legislative district

Delaware's 9th State Senate district
Senator
Jack Walsh; D–Newport
- Registration: 49.2% Democratic; 23.3% Republican; 27.5% No party preference
- Demographics: 63% White; 15% Black; 15% Hispanic; 5% Asian; 1% Other
- Population (2018): 41,895
- Registered voters: 29,305

Delaware's 9th Senate district is one of 21 districts in the Delaware Senate. It has been represented by Democrat Jack Walsh since 2016, succeeding fellow Democrat Karen Peterson.

== Geography ==
District 9 covers the areas between Newark and Wilmington in New Castle County, including parts of Pike Creek, Pike Creek Valley, Newport, Stanton, and far eastern Newark proper.

Like all districts in the state, the 9th Senate district is located entirely within Delaware's at-large congressional district. It overlaps with the 17th, 18th, 19th, 21st, and 24th districts of the Delaware House of Representatives.

== Recent election results ==
Delaware Senators are elected to staggered four-year terms. Under normal circumstances, the 9th district holds elections in presidential years, except immediately after redistricting, when all seats are up for election regardless of usual cycle.

=== 2020 ===
2020 Delaware Senate election, District 9
Party	Candidate	Votes	%
Democratic	Jack Walsh (incumbent)	12,728	67.1
Republican	Todd Ruckle	6,248	32.9
Total votes		18,976	100
Democratic hold			

=== 2016 ===
2016 Delaware Senate election, District 9
Primary election
Party	Candidate	Votes	%
Democratic	Jack Walsh	1,364	57.2
Democratic	Caitlin Olsen	1,022	42.8
Total votes		2,386	100
General election
Democratic	Jack Walsh	13,500	100
Total votes		13,500	100
Democratic hold			

=== 2012 ===
2012 Delaware Senate election, District 9
Party	Candidate	Votes	%
Democratic	Karen Peterson (incumbent)	13,941	100
Total votes		13,941	100
Democratic hold			

=== Federal and statewide results ===
Year	Office	Results
2020	President	Biden 63.6 – 34.5%
2016	President	Clinton 57.4 – 37.0%
2014	Senate	Coons 60.1 – 37.3%
2012	President	Obama 64.6 – 33.9%
2012	Senate	Carper 72.5 – 24.0%
2012	Governor	Markell 75.1 – 22.9%
