= Jack Walsh (politician) =

American politician

Member of the Delaware Senate from the 9th district
- Incumbent
- Assumed office November 9, 2016
- Preceded by: Karen E. Peterson

Personal details
- Party: Democratic
- Spouse: Jeanmarie Walsh
- Occupation: Electrician
- Website: http://www.jackforsenate.org/

John "Jack" Walsh is an American politician who represents the 9th district of the Delaware Senate. First elected in 2016, he is a member of the Democratic Party.

== Career ==
Walsh is a trained electrician and a member of the International Brotherhood of Electrical Workers. Prior to his government service, Walsh held various positions with his local branch of the union. He currently works as a project manager at Preferred Electric Inc.

Walsh is vice president of the board of directors for the Humane Animal Partners and serves on the boards of the Certified Thoroughbred Program and the Delaware Prosperity Partnership.

Walsh was first elected to the Delaware Senate in November 2016.

== Legislation ==
Walsh is known for his work in economic development and labor policy. He has sponsored legislation to reduce wage theft and to increase Delaware's minimum wage.

== Electoral history ==
2016: Walsh defeated Caitlin M. Olsen in the Democratic Primary held on September 13, 2016. He was unopposed in the General Election held on November 8, 2016.

2020: Walsh defeated Republican nominee Todd Ruckle with 12,728 votes (67.07%) in the General Election held on November 3, 2020.

2022: Walsh defeated Republican nominee Brenda Mennella with 7,172 votes (61.5%) in the General Election held on November 8, 2022.
