= Delaware's 1st Senate district =

American legislative district

Delaware's 1st State Senate district
Senator
Dan Cruce; D–Wilmington
- Registration: 59.6% Democratic; 18.7% Republican; 21.7% No party preference
- Demographics: 65.3% White; 22.7% Black; 5.1% Hispanic; 2.7% Asian; 0.9% Other
- Population (2023): 45,120
- Registered voters: 33,915

Delaware's 1st Senate district is one of 21 districts in the Delaware Senate. It has been represented by Democrat Dan Cruce since 2025, succeeding Democrat Sarah McBride who resigned after being elected to the U.S. House of Representatives.

== Geography ==
District 1 covers the northeastern tip of New Castle County along the Delaware River, including Claymont, Bellefonte, most of Edgemoor, and parts of northern Wilmington.

Like all districts in the state, the 1st Senate district is located entirely within Delaware's at-large congressional district. It overlaps with the 1st, 3rd, 4th, 6th, 7th, and 10th districts of the Delaware House of Representatives. The district borders New Jersey via the Delaware River and Pennsylvania via the Twelve-Mile Circle.

== Recent election results ==
Delaware Senators are elected to staggered four-year terms. Under normal circumstances, the 1st district holds elections in presidential years, except immediately after redistricting, when all seats are up for election regardless of the usual cycle.

=== 2020 ===
2020 Delaware Senate election, District 1
Primary election
Party	Candidate	Votes	%
Democratic	Sarah McBride	7,902	91.3
Democratic	Joseph McCole	752	8.7
Total votes		8,654	100
General election
Democratic	Sarah McBride	16,865	73.3
Republican	Steve Washington	6,144	26.7
Total votes		23,009	100
Democratic hold			

=== 2016 ===
2016 Delaware Senate election, District 1
Primary election
Party	Candidate	Votes	%
Democratic	Harris McDowell III (incumbent)	3,876	70.8
Democratic	Joseph McCole	1,596	29.2
Total votes		5,472	100
General election
Democratic	Harris McDowell III (incumbent)	11,858	56.3
Republican	James Spadola	9,195	43.7
Total votes		21,053	100
Democratic hold			

=== 2012 ===
2012 Delaware Senate election, District 1
Primary election
Party	Candidate	Votes	%
Democratic	Harris McDowell III (incumbent)	2,342	52.2
Democratic	David D. Brady	1,613	36.0
Democratic	James Martin	528	11.8
Total votes		4,483	100
General election
Democratic	Harris McDowell III (incumbent)	15,155	85.3
Independent	Robert Clark	2,054	11.6
Libertarian	Bryan Lintz	555	3.1
Total votes		17,764	100
Democratic hold			

=== Federal and statewide results ===
Year	Office	Results
2020	President	Biden 74.2 – 24.2%
2016	President	Clinton 68.0 – 26.7%
2014	Senate	Coons 70.8 – 26.4%
2012	President	Obama 70.4 – 27.8%
2012	Senate	Carper 76.0 – 19.4%
2012	Governor	Markell 78.7 – 18.8%
