= Karen E. Peterson =

American politician

Karen Peterson

Member of the Delaware Senate from the 9th district
- In office November 6, 2002 – November 9, 2016
- Preceded by: Thomas B. Sharp
- Succeeded by: Jack Walsh

Personal details
- Party: Democratic
- Spouse: Vikki Bandy

Karen Peterson is an American politician who formerly represented the 9th district of the Delaware Senate. First elected in 2002, she is a member of the Democratic Party. Peterson served in the Senate until 2016.

On May 7, 2013, Peterson came out as lesbian during Senate debate on same-sex marriage in Delaware, becoming the state's first openly LGBT legislator. At that time, she had been with her partner Vikki Bandy for 24 years, and the two had entered a civil union when Delaware legalized them the year before. The two were married on July 1, 2013, becoming the first same-sex couple to convert their existing civil union into marriage in Delaware.
