= Robert Venables Sr. =

American politician (1933–2021)

Member of the Delaware Senate from the 21st district
- In office January 10, 1989 – January 13, 2015
- Preceded by: William Slatcher
- Succeeded by: Bryant Richardson

Personal details
- Born: January 21, 1933 Bethel, Delaware, U.S.
- Died: December 18, 2021 (aged 88) Delaware
- Party: Democratic
- Education: Laurel High School

Robert L. Venables Sr. (January 21, 1933 – December 18, 2021) was an American politician. He served as Democratic member of the Delaware Senate from 1989 to 2015, representing District 21. He graduated from Laurel High School. Venables died on December 18, 2021.

== Electoral history ==
- In 1988, Venables challenged incumbent Republican William Slatcher and won the general election by 93 votes with 5,033 votes total (50.5%) against Slatcher.
- In 1992, Venables was challenged by Slatcher for a rematch and won the general election with 7,595 votes (64%) against Slatcher.
- In 1994, Venables was unopposed for the general election, winning 5,299 votes.
- In 1998, Venables was unopposed for the general election, winning 6,142 votes.
- In 2002, Venables was unopposed for the general election, winning 7,756 votes.
- In 2004, Venables won the general election with 9,344 votes (59.6%) against Republican nominee Daniel Short.
- In 2008, Venables was unopposed for the general election, winning 12,603 votes.
- In 2012, Venables won the general election with 8,955 votes (55.9%) against Republican nominee Bryant Richardson and Libertarian candidate John Potter.
- In 2014, Venables was defeated by Republican Bryant Richardson in the general election. He won 4,514 votes (45.9%).
