= Elizabeth Lockman =

American politician

Member of the Delaware Senate from the 3rd district
- Incumbent
- Assumed office January 8, 2019
- Preceded by: Robert I. Marshall

Personal details
- Party: Democratic
- Education: Alexis I. duPont High School; New York University; University of Delaware
- Profession: Professor
- Website: Official website

Sarah Elizabeth "Tizzy" Lockman is an American politician and member of the Democratic Party. She serves in the Delaware Senate representing District 3, which covers parts of Wilmington, including the downtown and Riverfront areas.

== Early life and career ==
Lockman was raised on the west side of Wilmington, Delaware and graduated from Alexis I. duPont High School. She received a B.A. from New York University and a M.A. from the University of Delaware. She works as an adjunct professor at the University of Delaware.

== Political career ==
In 2014, Lockman was appointed a member of the Wilmington Education Advisory Committee (WEAC) by Governor Jack Markell, and she became vice chair when the body turned into the Wilmington Education Improvement Commission (WEIC).

Lockman defeated Jordan Hines, both political novices, in the Democratic primary, in a contentious and closely watched race. With no general election opponent, the win ensured she would succeed Robert Marshall, who had represented the area for over 40 years. Lockman is the second African-American woman to be elected to the Delaware Senate, after Margaret Rose Henry, who retired the year before Lockman was elected. In 2020, Lockman was elected as Senate Majority Whip.

== Legislation ==
In 2024, Lockman introduced legislation to require a permit to purchase handguns in the state of Delaware. The bill was signed into law on May 16, 2024.

== Electoral history ==
2018: Lockman defeated Jordan Hines in the September 6, 2018, Democratic Primary with 2,143 votes (56.36%). She was unopposed in the General Election of the same year.

2022: Lockman ran unopposed in the Democratic Primary and General Election of 2022.

2024: Lockman ran unopposed in the Democratic Primary and General Election of 2024.

== Personal life ==
In December 2020, Lockman married John Collins.
