= Delaware's 3rd Senate district =

American legislative district

Delaware's 3rd State Senate district
Senator
Elizabeth Lockman; D–Wilmington
- Registration: 71.5% Democratic; 9.6% Republican; 18.9% No party preference
- Demographics: 25% White; 51% Black; 19% Hispanic; 1% Asian; 2% Other
- Population (2018): 39,110
- Registered voters: 28,064

Delaware's 3rd Senate district is one of 21 districts in the Delaware Senate. It has been represented by Democrat Elizabeth Lockman since 2018, succeeding fellow Democrat Robert Marshall.

== Geography ==
District 3 is based in downtown Wilmington, also covering some unincorporated areas to the south.

Like all districts in the state, the 3rd Senate district is located entirely within Delaware's at-large congressional district. It overlaps with the 2nd, 3rd, 4th, and 13th districts of the Delaware House of Representatives. At 5 square miles, it is the smallest Senate district in the state.

== Recent election results ==
Delaware Senators are elected to staggered four-year terms. Under normal circumstances, the 3rd district holds elections in midterm years, except immediately after redistricting, when all seats are up for election regardless of usual cycle.

=== 2024 ===
Delaware Senate 3rd district general election, 2024
Party	Candidate	Votes	%
Democratic	Elizabeth Lockman (incumbent)	11,831	100%
Total votes		11,831	100%
Democratic hold			

=== 2018 ===
2018 Delaware Senate election, District 3
Primary election
Party	Candidate	Votes	%
Democratic	Elizabeth Lockman	2,143	56.4
Democratic	Jordan Hines	1,660	43.6
Total votes		3,803	100
General election
Democratic	Elizabeth Lockman	9,099	100
Total votes		9,099	100
Democratic hold			

=== 2014 ===
2014 Delaware Senate election, District 3
Primary election
Party	Candidate	Votes	%
Democratic	Robert Marshall (incumbent)	945	51.0
Democratic	Sherry Dorsey Walker	908	49.0
Total votes		1,853	100
General election
Democratic	Robert Marshall (incumbent)	5,214	100
Total votes		5,214	100
Democratic hold			

=== 2012 ===
2012 Delaware Senate election, District 3
Primary election
Party	Candidate	Votes	%
Democratic	Robert Marshall (incumbent)	2,504	62.2
Democratic	Eric Anderson	912	22.7
Democratic	Timothy Meades, Sr.	609	15.1
Total votes		4,025	100
General election
Democratic	Robert Marshall (incumbent)	12,322	100
Total votes		12,322	100
Democratic hold			

=== Federal and statewide results ===
Year	Office	Results
2020	President	Biden 85.4 – 13.5%
2016	President	Clinton 83.5 – 13.1%
2014	Senate	Coons 82.7 – 14.9%
2012	President	Obama 87.2 – 11.8%
2012	Senate	Carper 88.7 – 8.2%
2012	Governor	Markell 89.7 – 8.5%
