= Brian Bushweller =

American politician

Member of the Delaware Senate from the 17th district
- In office November 5, 2008 – November 7, 2018
- Preceded by: John Still
- Succeeded by: W. Charles Paradee

Personal details
- Party: Democratic
- Spouse: Rocky Bushweller
- Education: University of Delaware (BS, MS)

Brian J. Bushweller is an American politician. He was a Democratic member of the Delaware Senate from 2008 to 2018, representing the 17th district.

Bushweller was raised in New York. He received an A.A. in liberal arts from Ulster County Community College, a B.A. in music from Oklahoma City University, an A.M. in education from Stanford University, and an M.A. in management and supervision from Central Michigan University.

Originally a junior high school music teacher at a public school and an elementary school teacher at a Christian school, Bushweller became a labor union official in Florida and then New York. He moved to Dover, Delaware when he was given a job with the Delaware State Education Association (DSEA), the largest union for Delaware teachers.

Bushweller left the DSEA in 1993 when Governor Tom Carper hired him as his legislative liaison. Five years later, Carper appointed him Secretary of the Department of Public Safety. When Carper was elected to the United States Senate in 2000, Bushweller became his state director until leaving the position in 2007 to launch his campaign for the Delaware Senate.

Bushweller was elected to the 17th District seat in the Delaware Senate in 2008, defeating his Republican opponent, former Dover Mayor James Hutchison.

Bushweller married Rocky Bushweller in 1966, with whom he has five children.
