= Ernesto Lopez =

American politician from Delaware (born 1976)

Member of the Delaware Senate from the 6th district
- In office November 6, 2012 – November 2022
- Preceded by: Constituency established
- Succeeded by: Russ Huxtable

Personal details
- Born: November 16, 1976 (age 49) Río Piedras, Puerto Rico
- Party: Republican
- Education: Gettysburg College (BA); University of Delaware (MEd)
- Website: lopezforde.com

Ernesto B. Lopez (born November 16, 1976) is an American politician and a former Republican member of the Delaware Senate, where he had represented the 6th District from 2012 to 2023. He was the first Latino elected to the Delaware Senate.

Born in Rio Piedras, Puerto Rico, Lopez moved to Delaware as a child with his parents. After attending public schools, he earned his BA at Gettysburg College and his EdD in educational leadership from the University of Delaware. After graduating, he worked for the university as an administrator.

Lopez ran for New Castle County Council President in 2004 but lost to Democrat Paul Clark. In 2012, he ran for and won election to fill the Senate District 6 seat vacated by retiring Republican Liane Sorenson whose district had been redistricted from New Castle County to Sussex County. Lopez is the prime sponsor of Rylie's Law, allowing for children in Delaware to have access to physician prescribed medicinal cannabis, which is named after one of his constituents. Lopez is also the prime sponsor of Senate Bill 200 which bans offshore drilling and seismic testing in Delaware's coastal waters.

Lopez has two daughters with his former wife. In 2021, Lopez announced he would not seek reelection.

== Electoral history ==
- In 2004, Lopez ran for New Castle County Council President and won the Republican primary with 7,320 votes (60.97%) against Gary Bowman. However, he lost in the general election to Democrat Paul Clark with 91,836 votes (41.4%).
- In 2012, Lopez ran for the Delaware Senate and won the Republican primary with 2,163 votes (54.9%) against Glen Urquhart. He went on to win the three-way general election with 13,603 votes (56.1%) against Democratic nominee Andrew Staton and Libertarian candidate Gwendolyn Jones.
- In 2014, Lopez won the general election with 11,633 votes (63.4%) against Democratic nominee Claire Snyder-Hall.
- In 2018, Lopez won the general election with 14,781 votes (52.6%) against Democratic nominee David B. Baker.

Delaware Senate
Preceded by Liane Sorenson	Member of the Delaware Senate from the 6th district 2012-2022	Succeeded by Russ Huxtable
