= Delaware's 21st Senate district =

American legislative district

Delaware's 21st State Senate district
Senator
Bryant Richardson; R–Seaford
- Registration: 42.1% Republican; 34.8% Democratic; 23.1% No party preference
- Demographics: 70% White; 18% Black; 9% Hispanic; 1% Asian; 2% Other
- Population (2018): 42,674
- Registered voters: 29,696

Delaware's 21st Senate district is one of 21 districts in the Delaware Senate. It has been represented by Republican Bryant Richardson since his 2014 defeat of Democrat Robert Venables Sr. It is the most Republican-leaning district in the Senate.

== Geography ==
District 21 is based in the southwestern corner of Sussex County, including the communities of Seaford, Laurel, Delmar, Bethel, Gumboro, and Reliance.

Like all districts in the state, the 21st Senate district is located entirely within Delaware's at-large congressional district. It overlaps with the 35th, 39th, 40th, and 41st districts of the Delaware House of Representatives. It borders the state of Maryland.

== Recent election results ==
Delaware Senators are elected to staggered four-year terms. Under normal circumstances, the 21st district holds elections in midterm years, except immediately after redistricting, when all seats are up for election regardless of usual cycle.

=== 2024 ===
Delaware Senate 10th district general election, 2024
Party	Candidate	Votes	%
Republican	Bryant Richardson (incumbent)	17,105	100%
Total votes		17,105	100%
Republican hold			

=== 2018 ===
2018 Delaware Senate election, District 21
Party	Candidate	Votes	%
Republican	Bryant Richardson (incumbent)	8,816	65.0
Democratic	Bob Wheatley	4,741	35.0
Total votes		13,557	100
Republican hold			

=== 2014 ===
2014 Delaware Senate election, District 21
Party	Candidate	Votes	%
Republican	Bryant Richardson	5,210	53.0
Democratic	Robert Venables Sr. (incumbent)	4,514	45.9
Libertarian	John Potter	113	1.1
Total votes		9,837	100
Republican gain from Democratic			

=== 2012 ===
2012 Delaware Senate election, District 21
Primary election
Party	Candidate	Votes	%
Democratic	Robert Venables Sr. (incumbent)	8,955	55.9
Republican	Bryant Richardson	6,889	43.0
Libertarian	John Potter	187	1.2
Total votes		16,031	100
Democratic hold			

=== Federal and statewide results ===
Year	Office	Results
2020	President	Trump 65 – 33.6%
2016	President	Trump 66.3 – 29.6%
2014	Senate	Wade 61.5 – 37.0%
2012	President	Romney 60.2 – 38.6%
2012	Senate	Carper 52.6 – 42.2%
2012	Governor	Markell 54.3 – 43.6%
