= Robert I. Marshall =

American politician (1946–2024)

Member of the Delaware Senate from the 3rd district
- In office January 9, 1979 – January 8, 2019
- Preceded by: George Schlor
- Succeeded by: Elizabeth Lockman

Personal details
- Born: Robert I. Marchlewicz; October 16, 1946 Wilmington, Delaware, U.S.
- Died: March 31, 2024 (aged 77) Newark, Delaware, U.S.
- Party: Democratic
- Education: Thomas Edison State College

Robert I. Marshall (né Marchlewicz; October 16, 1946 – March 30, 2024) was an American politician and a Democratic member of the Delaware Senate, representing the 3rd district from 1979 until 2019.

== Biography ==
Robert I. Marshall was born in Wilmington, Delaware, on October 16, 1946. He earned his BA from Thomas Edison State College. Marshall died at a hospital in Newark, Delaware on March 30, 2024, at the age of 77.

== Political positions ==
Marshall was a supporter of gun control and supported an assault weapons ban for Delaware.

== Elections ==
- 2012 Marshall won the three-way September 11, 2012 Democratic Primary with 2,504 votes (52.2%) and was unopposed for the November 6, 2012 General election, winning with 12,322 votes.
- 1978 When Democratic Senator George Schlor retired and left the District 13 seat open, Marshall won the 1978 Democratic Primary and won the November 7, 1978 General election with 3,159 votes (63%) against Republican nominee John Stawicki.
- 1982 Marshall won the 1982 Democratic Primary and was unopposed for the November 2, 1982 General election, winning with 5,886 votes (76%) against Republican nominee Samuel Moreno.
- 1984 Marshall won the 1984 Democratic Primary and was unopposed for the November 2, 1984 General election, winning with 7,825 votes.
- 1988 Marshall was unopposed for the September 10, 1988 Democratic Primary and won the November 8, 1988 General election with 6,611 votes.
- 1992 Marshall won the September 12, 1992 Democratic Primary with 2,484 votes (70%) against Wesley Smith, running as a Democrat, and was unopposed for the November 3, 1992 General election, winning with 7,759 votes.
- 1994 Marshall was unopposed for the Democratic Primary and won the three-way November 8, 1994 General election with 4,696 votes (76.8%) against Republican nominee Dwight Davis and Wesley Smith, running as the Libertarian candidate.
- 1998 Marshall won the September 12, 1998 Democratic Primary with 1,344 votes (74.8%) and the November 3, 1998 General election, winning with 4,135 votes (85.1%) against Wesley Smith, running as the Republican nominee.
- 2002 Marshall won the September 10, 2002 Democratic Primary with 1,359 votes (76.0%) and won the November 5, 2002 General election with 4,548 votes (75.0%) against Republican nominee Michael Brown.
- 2004 Marshall was unopposed for both the September 11, 2004 Democratic Primary and the November 2, 2004 General election, winning with 9,343 votes.
- 2008 Marshall was unopposed for both the September 9, 2008 Democratic Primary and the November 4, 2008 General election, winning with 10,225 votes.
