= Darius J. Brown =

American politician

Member of the Delaware Senate from the 2nd district
- Incumbent
- Assumed office November 7, 2018
- Preceded by: Margaret Rose Henry

Personal details
- Party: Democratic
- Occupation: Legislator
- Website: Official website

Darius J. Brown is an American politician and member of the Democratic Party. A former Wilmington city councilmember, he was elected to the Delaware Senate in 2018, representing district 2.

== Career ==
Between June 2010 and January 2011, Brown was a constituent relations specialist for Connections, a nonprofit state contractor. From 2011 to 2016, Brown worked as an independent contract lobbyist for Connections and other companies. He became vice president of constituent relations for Connections in November 2016.

In 2012, Brown was elected to the Wilmington City Council to represent the 3rd district. He unsuccessfully ran for city treasurer in 2016.

=== Delaware Senate ===
Brown was elected to the Delaware Senate in 2018 after winning 2,115 votes (38.4%) in a four-way primary with no opponent in the general election. He is the second African-American man to be elected to the Delaware Senate. He was appointed chair of the Senate Judiciary Committee, and The News Journal described him as one of the "champions of criminal justice reform" for his actions while chair. He was removed as chair following his May 2021 arrest for domestic violence accusations. In 2021, Brown was hired as executive director of the Wilmington HOPE Commission, a not-for-profit organization which aims to lower recidivism by helping ex-offenders re-enter society after leaving prison.

In 2024, Brown was the only Democrat in the State Senate to oppose a bill formally abolishing capital punishment in Delaware.

==== Legislation sponsored ====
Brown sponsored a Constitutional Amendment to include race, color, and national origin to the Equal Rights Amendment of the Delaware Constitution. He also introduced legislation prohibiting discrimination based on hairstyles historically associated with race.

Brown is known for his work in criminal justice reform and has sponsored legislation to improve Delaware's record expungement system and expand employment for incarcerated individuals.

== Legal issues ==
In 2018, federal and state tax liens were filed against Brown for over $60,000 in unpaid taxes between 2012 and 2016, which Brown failed to report on his required financial disclosures during his initial primary election. He had a previous lien for over $4,000 in unpaid state taxes from 2010 to 2013.

In May 2021, Brown was arrested on misdemeanor charges for domestic violence after allegedly punching a woman at a restaurant in Talleyville, Delaware during an argument about a social media post. He was removed as chair of the Senate Judiciary Committee by Senate President Pro Tempore David Sokola several days after the arrest. After his arrest, the Women's Defense Coalition of Delaware called on the Ethics Committee of the State Senate to conduct a formal inquiry into the incident. At trial, Brown was acquitted of all charges.

== Electoral history ==
2018: Brown won a four-way Democratic Primary held on September 6, 2018, with 2,115 votes (38.39%). He was unopposed in the November 6, 2018, general election.

2022: Brown was unopposed in the general election held on November 8, 2022.

2024: Brown defeated Conservative Party nominee Jon Roe with 1,880 votes (97.61%) in the general election held on November 5, 2024.
