= Bruce Ennis =

American politician (born 1939)

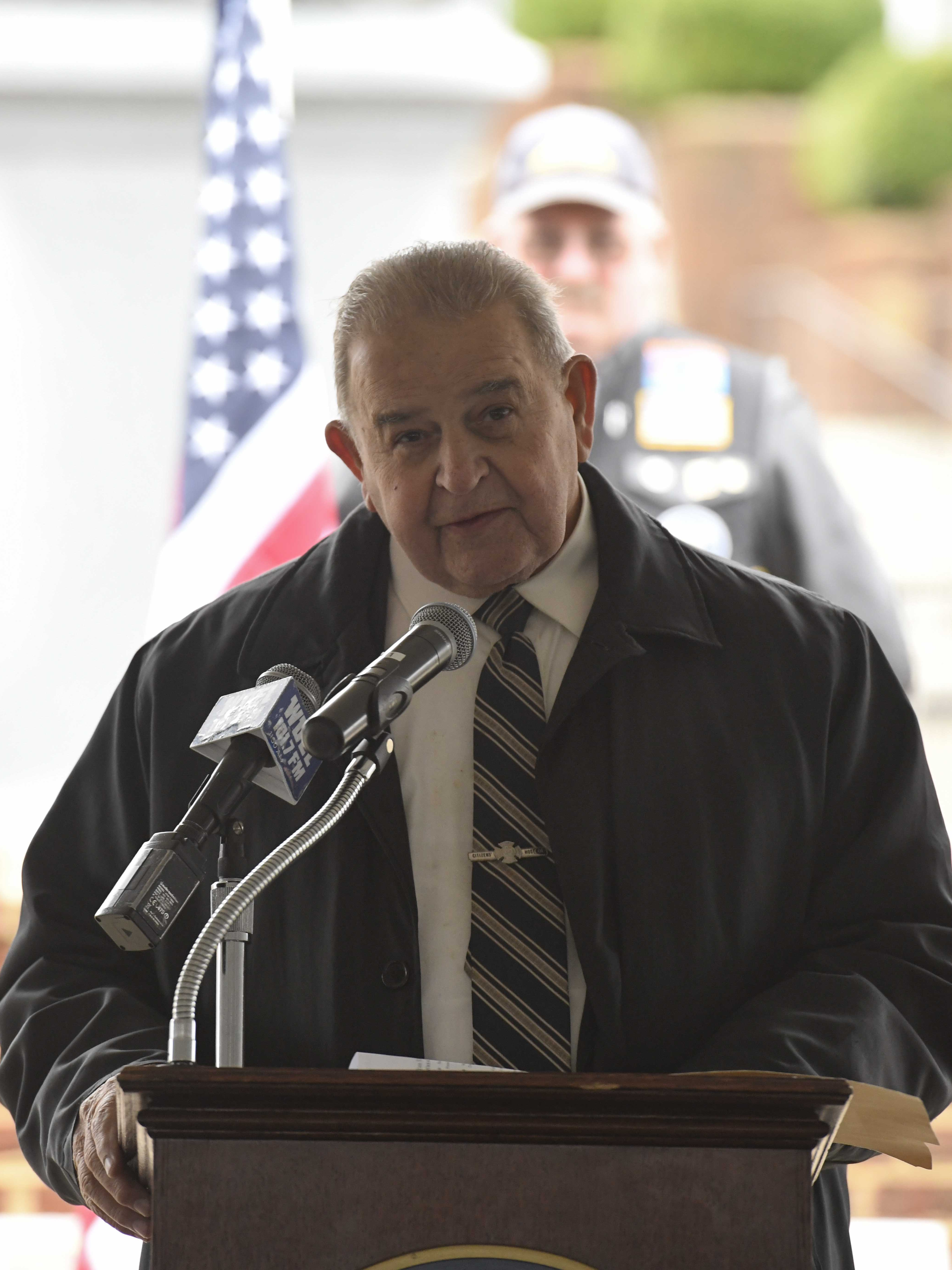
- Bruce Ennis speaks at Wreaths Across America

Member of the Delaware Senate from the 14th district
- In office November 4, 2007 – November 8, 2022
- Preceded by: James Vaughn
- Succeeded by: Kyra Hoffner

Member of the Delaware House of Representatives from the 28th district
- In office November 3, 1982 – November 4, 2007
- Preceded by: Gerard Cain
- Succeeded by: William Carson Jr.

Personal details
- Born: March 25, 1939 (age 87) Dover, Delaware, U.S.
- Party: Democratic

Bruce C. Ennis (born March 25, 1939) is an American politician and a former Democratic member of the Delaware Senate representing District 14 until 2022. Ennis previously served in the Delaware House of Representatives from 1983 to 2007. He is a retired member of the Delaware State Police.

== Electoral history ==
- 1982 When Democratic Representative Gerard Cain retired and left the District 28 seat open, Ennis won the 1982 Democratic Primary and won the November 2, 1982 General election with 2,219 votes (54%) against Republican nominee Robert Riddagh.
- 1984 Ennis won the 1984 Democratic Primary and won the November 6, 1984 General election with 3,518 votes (68%) against Republican nominee Edgar Dugan.
- 1986 Ennis was unopposed for both the September 6, 1986 Democratic Primary and the November 4, 1986 General election, winning with 2,895 votes.
- 1988 Ennis was unopposed for both the September 10, 1988 Democratic Primary and won the November 8, 1988 General election, winning with 4,011 votes.
- 1990 Ennis was unopposed for both the 1992 Democratic Primary and won the November 6, 1990 General election, winning with 3,374 votes.
- 1992 Ennis was unopposed for the September 12, 1992 Democratic Primary and won the November 3, 1992 General election with 4,460 votes (80%) against Republican nominee Stanley Slusark.
- 1994 Ennis was unopposed for both the September 10, 1994 Democratic Primary and the November 8, 1994 General election, winning with 2,866 votes.
- 1996 Ennis was unopposed for the September 7, 1996 Democratic Primary and won the November 5, 1996 General election with 3,377 votes (61%) against Republican nominee Mark Pugh and Libertarian candidate John Cooper.
- 1998 Ennis was unopposed for both the September 12, 1998 Democratic Primary and the November 3, 1998 General election, winning with 3,033 votes.
- 2000 Ennis was unopposed for the September 9, 2000 Democratic Primary and won the November 7, 2000 General election with 5,340 votes (95.6%) against Libertarian candidate Terri Lewis.
- 2002 Ennis was unopposed for the September 10, 2002 Democratic Primary and won the three-way November 5, 2002 General election with 2,678 votes (59.9%) against Republican nominee Mark Pugh and Libertarian candidate Terri Lewis.
- 2004 Ennis was unopposed for both the September 11, 2004 Democratic Primary and the November 2, 2004 General election, winning with 6,020 votes.
- 2006 Ennis was unopposed for both the September 12, 2006 Democratic Primary and the November 7, 2006 General election, winning with 4,343 votes.
- 2007 After the death of Democratic Senator James T. Vaughn, Ennis won the November 3, 2007 Special election with 4,272 votes (68%) against Republican candidate Joanne Christian, who had also qualified and received votes as the Independent Party of Delaware candidate.
- 2010 Ennis was unopposed for the September 17, 2010 Democratic Primary and won the November 2, 2010 General election with 12,238 votes (65.6%) against Republican nominee John Moritz.
- 2012 Ennis was unopposed for the September 11, 2012 Democratic Primary and won the November 6, 2012 General election with 12,031 votes (61.1%) against Republican nominee Scott Unruh.
- 2016 Ennis was unopposed for the September 13, 2016 Democratic Primary and won the November 8, 2016 General election with 13,454 votes (59.6%) against Republican nominee Carl Pace.
- 2020 Ennis won the Democratic Primary on September 13, 2016 with 3,333 votes (53.5%) and won the November 3, 2020 General election with 16,429 votes (59.5%) against Republican nominee Craig Pugh.
