= Shellburne, Delaware =

Unincorporated community in Delaware, United States

- Unincorporated community
- Location within Delaware Location within the United States
- Coordinates: 39°46′50″N 75°30′44″W
- Country: United States
- State: Delaware
- County: New Castle
- Elevation: 236 ft (72 m)
- Time zone: UTC-5 (Eastern (EST))
  - Summer (DST): UTC-4 (EDT)
- Area code: 302
- GNIS feature ID: 217103

Shellburne is an unincorporated community in New Castle County, Delaware, United States. Shellburne is located east of Shipley Road at Weldin Road to the northeast of Wilmington.
