= F. Gary Simpson =

American politician from Delaware

Gary Simpson
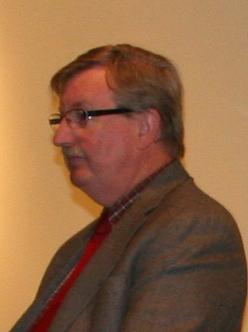
- Simpson in 2012

Minority Leader of the Delaware Senate
- In office January 8, 2009 – January 8, 2019
- Preceded by: Charlie Copeland
- Succeeded by: Gerald Hocker

Member of the Delaware Senate from the 18th district
- In office November 4, 1998 – November 7, 2018
- Preceded by: Robert Voshell
- Succeeded by: David Wilson

Personal details
- Party: Republican
- Education: University of Delaware (BS, MS)

F. Gary Simpson is an American politician. He was a Republican member of the Delaware Senate from 1998 to 2018. Simpson earned his BS and MS at the University of Delaware.

== Electoral history ==
- In 1998, Simpson won the general election with 6,458 votes (53.1%) against Democratic nominee Gary Downes.
- In 2002, Simpson won the general election with 8,875 votes 57.4%) against Democratic nominee John Burton.
- In 2004, Simpson won the general election with 14,392 votes (63.3%) against Democratic nominee F. Thomas Savage.
- In 2008, Simpson faced Democrat Gary Downes in a rematch of their 1998 contest, and Simpson won with 14,596 votes (55.1%) against Downes.
- In 2012, Simpson won the Republican primary with 1,515 votes (68.0%) and was unopposed for the general election, winning 13,198 votes.

Delaware Senate
Preceded by Robert Voshell	Member of the Delaware Senate from the 18th district 1998–2018	Succeeded by David Wilson
Preceded by Charlie Copeland	Minority Leader of the Delaware Senate; 2009–2019	Succeeded by Gerald Hocker
