= Delaware's 18th Senate district =

American legislative district

Delaware's 18th State Senate district
Senator
David Wilson; R–Milford
- Registration: 37.2% Republican; 36.4% Democratic; 26.4% No party preference
- Demographics: 68% White; 18% Black; 11% Hispanic; 1% Asian; 2% Other
- Population (2018): 48,421
- Registered voters: 33,101

Delaware's 18th Senate district is one of 21 districts in the Delaware Senate. It has been represented by Republican David Wilson since 2018, succeeding fellow Republican F. Gary Simpson.

== Geography ==
District 18 covers southern Kent County and northern Sussex County, including the communities of Milford, Harrington, Greenwood, Ellendale, Houston, Farmington, Slaughter Beach, and Lincoln.

Like all districts in the state, the 18th Senate district is located entirely within Delaware's at-large congressional district. It overlaps with the 20th, 30th, 33rd, 35th, and 36th districts of the Delaware House of Representatives. It borders the state of Maryland. At over 280 square miles, it is the largest legislative district in the state.

== Recent election results ==
Delaware Senators are elected to staggered four-year terms. Under normal circumstances, the 18th district holds elections in midterm years, except immediately after redistricting, when all seats are up for election regardless of usual cycle.

=== 2024 ===
Delaware Senate 10th district general election, 2024
Party	Candidate	Votes	%
Republican	David L. Wilson (incumbent)	18,563	100%
Total votes		18,563	100%
Republican hold			

=== 2018 ===
2018 Delaware Senate election, District 18
Party	Candidate	Votes	%
Republican	David Wilson	10,816	65.2
Democratic	James Purcell	5,783	34.8
Total votes		16,599	100
Republican hold			

=== 2014 ===
2014 Delaware Senate election, District 18
Party	Candidate	Votes	%
Republican	F. Gary Simpson (incumbent)	7,853	66.7
Democratic	Patrick Emory	3,917	33.3
Total votes		11,770	100
Republican hold			

=== 2012 ===
2012 Delaware Senate election, District 18
Primary election
Party	Candidate	Votes	%
Republican	F. Gary Simpson (incumbent)	1,515	68.0
Republican	Matthew Opaliski	712	32.0
Total votes		2,227	100
General election
Republican	F. Gary Simpson (incumbent)	13,198	100
Total votes		13,198	100
Republican hold			

=== Federal and statewide results ===
Year	Office	Results
2020	President	Trump 59.1 – 39.3%
2016	President	Trump 61.6 – 33.9%
2014	Senate	Wade 57.8 – 40.5%
2012	President	Romney 56.7 – 41.9%
2012	Senate	Carper 52.4 – 40.9%
2012	Governor	Markell 54.8 – 42.9%
