= Delaware's 8th Senate district =

American legislative district

Delaware's 8th State Senate district
Senator
David Sokola; D–Newark
- Registration: 39.9% Democratic; 31.4% Republican; 28.7% No party preference
- Demographics: 76% White; 7% Black; 6% Hispanic; 8% Asian; 2% Other
- Population (2018): 44,996
- Registered voters: 25,651

Delaware's 8th Senate district is one of 21 districts in the Delaware Senate. It has been represented by Democrat David Sokola since 1990.

== Geography ==
District 8 is based in Newark – the state's third-largest city – and also covers parts of Hockessin and North Star.

Like all districts in the state, the 8th Senate district is located entirely within Delaware's at-large congressional district. It overlaps with the 12th, 21st, 22nd, 23rd, and 25th districts of the Delaware House of Representatives. The district borders Maryland to the west and Pennsylvania along the Twelve-Mile Circle.

== Recent election results ==
Delaware Senators are elected to staggered four-year terms. Under normal circumstances, the 8th district holds elections in presidential years, except immediately after redistricting, when all seats are up for election regardless of usual cycle.

=== 2020 ===
2020 Delaware Senate election, District 8
Party	Candidate	Votes	%
Democratic	David Sokola (incumbent)	13,281	100
Total votes		13,281	100
Democratic hold			

=== 2016 ===
2016 Delaware Senate election, District 8
Party	Candidate	Votes	%
Democratic	David Sokola (incumbent)	8,862	50.8
Republican	Meredith Chapman	8,115	46.5
Green	David Chandler	462	2.7
Total votes		17,439	100
Democratic hold			

=== 2012 ===
2012 Delaware Senate election, District 8
Party	Candidate	Votes	%
Democratic	David Sokola (incumbent)	10,099	60.7
Republican	William Stritzinger	6,535	39.3
Total votes		16,634	100
Democratic hold			

=== Federal and statewide results ===
Year	Office	Results
2020	President	Biden 64.1 – 33.9%
2016	President	Clinton 56.6 – 37.2%
2014	Senate	Coons 56.5 – 40.8%
2012	President	Obama 55.1 – 42.8%
2012	Senate	Carper 65.4 – 30.1%
2012	Governor	Markell 69.6 – 28.1%
