= Delaware's 2nd Senate district =

American legislative district

Delaware's 2nd State Senate district
Senator
Darius Brown; D–Wilmington
- Registration: 75.7% Democratic; 8.2% Republican; 16.1% No party preference
- Demographics: 21% White; 65% Black; 10% Hispanic; 2% Asian; 2% Other
- Population (2018): 42,153
- Registered voters: 29,383

Delaware's 2nd Senate district is one of 21 districts in the Delaware Senate. It has been represented by Democrat Darius Brown since 2018, succeeding fellow Democrat Margaret Rose Henry. It is the most Democratic-leaning district in the Senate.

== Geography ==
District 2 is based in southern and eastern Wilmington along the Delaware River in New Castle County, also covering Minquadale and parts of New Castle and Edgemoor.

Like all districts in the state, the 2nd Senate district is located entirely within Delaware's at-large congressional district. It overlaps with the 1st, 2nd, 6th, 16th, and 17th districts of the Delaware House of Representatives. The district borders New Jersey.

== Recent election results ==
Delaware Senators are elected to staggered four-year terms. Under normal circumstances, the 2nd district holds elections in midterm years, except immediately after redistricting, when all seats are up for election regardless of usual cycle.

=== 2024 ===
Delaware Senate 2nd district general election, 2024
Party	Candidate	Votes	%
Democratic	Darius J. Brown	14,273	92.97
Republican	Jon Roe	1,080	7.03%
Total votes		15,353	100%
Democratic hold			

=== 2018 ===
2018 Delaware Senate election, District 2
Primary election
Party	Candidate	Votes	%
Democratic	Darius Brown	2,115	38.4
Democratic	Bobbie Cummings	1,387	25.2
Democratic	Sam Guy	1,280	23.2
Democratic	Herman Holloway Jr.	727	13.2
Total votes		5,509	100
General election
Democratic	Darius Brown	11,783	100
Total votes		11,783	100
Democratic hold			

=== 2014 ===
2014 Delaware Senate election, District 2
Party	Candidate	Votes	%
Democratic	Margaret Rose Henry (incumbent)	7,324	87.9
Republican	Robert Martin	1,010	12.1
Total votes		8,334	100
Democratic hold			

=== 2012 ===
2012 Delaware Senate election, District 2
Party	Candidate	Votes	%
Democratic	Margaret Rose Henry (incumbent)	15,197	100
Total votes		15,197	100
Democratic hold			

=== Federal and statewide results ===
Year	Office	Results
2020	President	Biden 88.1 – 10.9%
2016	President	Clinton 87.0 – 10.3%
2014	Senate	Coons 88.8 – 9.6%
2012	President	Obama 91.8 – 7.6%
2012	Senate	Carper 92.1 – 5.8%
2012	Governor	Markell 92.6 – 6.1%
