= Delaware's 17th Senate district =

American legislative district

Delaware's 17th State Senate district
Senator
W. Charles Paradee; D–Dover
- Registration: 51.8% Democratic; 23.1% Republican; 25.1% No party preference
- Demographics: 46% White; 39% Black; 7% Hispanic; 2% Asian; 1% Native American; 4% Other
- Population (2018): 46,208
- Registered voters: 31,330

Delaware's 17th Senate district is one of 21 districts in the Delaware Senate. It has been represented by Democrat W. Charles Paradee since 2018, succeeding fellow Democrat Brian Bushweller.

== Geography ==
District 17 is based in Dover, covering most of the city proper as well as the nearby Kent County communities of Camden, Wyoming, and Rodney Village.

Like all districts in the state, the 17th Senate district is located entirely within Delaware's at-large congressional district. It overlaps with the 28th, 29th, 31st, 32nd, and 34th districts of the Delaware House of Representatives.

== Recent election results ==
Delaware Senators are elected to staggered four-year terms. Under normal circumstances, the 17th district holds elections in midterm years, except immediately after redistricting, when all seats are up for election regardless of usual cycle.

=== 2024 ===
Delaware Senate 17th district general election, 2024
Party	Candidate	Votes	%
Democratic	W. Charles Paradee	14,630	100%
Total votes		14,630	100%
Democratic hold			

=== 2018 ===
2018 Delaware Senate election, District 17
Primary election
Party	Candidate	Votes	%
Republican	Justin King	1,240	67.5
Republican	Donyale Hall	596	32.5
Total votes		1,836	100
General election
Democratic	W. Charles Paradee	9,343	64.3
Republican	Justin King	5,194	35.7
Total votes		14,537	100
Democratic hold			

=== 2014 ===
2014 Delaware Senate election, District 17
Party	Candidate	Votes	%
Democratic	Brian Bushweller (incumbent)	5,811	60.0
Republican	Kim Warfield	3,881	40.0
Total votes		9,692	100
Democratic hold			

=== 2012 ===
2012 Delaware Senate election, District 17
Party	Candidate	Votes	%
Democratic	Brian Bushweller (incumbent)	13,161	100
Total votes		13,161	100
Democratic hold			

=== Federal and statewide results ===
Year	Office	Results
2020	President	Biden 65.2 – 32.9%
2016	President	Clinton 58.1 – 36.2%
2014	Senate	Coons 57.4 – 41.1%
2012	President	Obama 61.9 – 36.7%
2012	Senate	Carper 68.8 – 27.1%
2012	Governor	Markell 68.4 – 29.1%
