= Wilmont, Delaware =

Unincorporated community in Delaware, United States

- Unincorporated community
- Location within Delaware Location within the United States
- Coordinates: 39°48′25″N 75°32′14″W
- Country: United States
- State: Delaware
- County: New Castle
- Elevation: 358 ft (109 m)
- Time zone: UTC-5 (Eastern (EST))
  - Summer (DST): UTC-4 (EDT)
- Area code: 302
- GNIS feature ID: 217097

Wilmont is an unincorporated community in New Castle County, Delaware, United States. Wilmont is located southwest of the intersection of Silverside Road and Shipley Road, east of Talleyville.
