= Margaret Rose Henry =

American politician (born 1944)

Majority Leader of the Delaware Senate
- In office January 10, 2017 – January 8, 2019
- Preceded by: David McBride
- Succeeded by: Nicole Poore

Member of the Delaware Senate from the 2nd district
- In office January 12, 1994 – January 8, 2019
- Preceded by: Herman Holloway
- Succeeded by: Darius J. Brown

Personal details
- Born: June 20, 1944 (age 82) Rayne, Louisiana, U.S.
- Party: Republican (Before 1998); Democratic (1998–present)
- Education: Texas Southern University (BA); Springfield College (MA)
- Website: Official website

Margaret Rose Henry (born June 20, 1944) is an American politician. She was a member of the Delaware Senate from 1994 to 2018. In September 2017, Henry announced she would not seek reelection to her District 2 seat. Senator Henry earned her BA from Texas Southern University and her MA from Springfield College.

Henry was the first African-American woman elected to the Delaware Senate. During her time in office, she worked to reform the juvenile justice system and helped create a needle-exchange program. In March 2018, she received a Lifetime Achievement Award from the New Castle County Chamber of Commerce.

Rose-Henry supports gun control and supported a bill to ban assault weapons in 2018.

== Elections ==
- In 1994, Henry ran as a Republican to replace Democrat Herman Holloway Sr., who had resigned. Henry won the Republican primary with 341 votes (91%), and won November 8, 1994 General election with 3,641 votes (58%) against Democratic nominee Herman Holloway Jr.
- In 1998, Henry switched her party affiliation to Democrat and was unopposed in the general election, winning 4,626 votes.
- In 2002, Henry won the Democratic primary with 1,908 votes (71.7%), and was unopposed for the general election, winning 5,908 votes.
- In 2004, Henry was unopposed for the general election, winning 10,398 votes.
- In 2008, Henry was unopposed for the general election, winning 11,872 votes.
- In 2012, Henry was unopposed for the general election, winning 15,197 votes.
- In 2014, Henry won the general election with 7,324 votes (87.9%) against Republican nominee Robert F. Martin.

Delaware Senate
Preceded by David McBride	Majority Leader of the Delaware Senate; 2017–2019	Succeeded by Nicole Poore
