= David L. Wilson =

American politician from Delaware (born 1950)

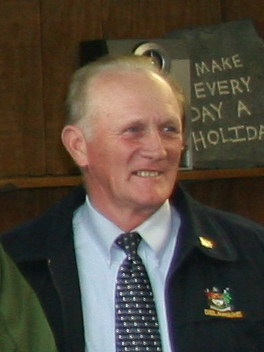

Member of the Delaware Senate from the 18th district
- Incumbent
- Assumed office November 7, 2018
- Preceded by: Gary Simpson

Member of the Delaware House of Representatives from the 35th district
- In office November 5, 2008 – November 7, 2018
- Preceded by: J. Benjamin Ewing
- Succeeded by: Jesse Vanderwende

Personal details
- Born: January 8, 1950 (age 76) Lincoln, Delaware, U.S.
- Party: Republican
- Website: repdavewilson.com

David Lee Wilson (born January 8, 1950) is an American politician and a Republican member of the Delaware Senate, where he has represented the 18th district since 2019. He was previously a member of the Delaware House of Representatives from 2008 to 2018.

== Electoral history ==
- In 2008, Wilson ran for the seat vacated by retiring Republican J. Benjamin Ewing, and won the general election with 5,174 votes (61%) against Democratic nominee L. Aaron Chaffinch.
- In 2010, Wilson won the general election with 4,719 votes (70.3%) against Democratic nominee James Westhoff.
- In 2012, Wilson won the general election with 5,836 votes (92.6%) against Libertarian candidate Ronnie Fitzgerald.
- In 2014, Wilson was unopposed in the general election, winning 4,155 votes.
- In 2016, Wilson won the Republican primary with 1,252 votes (69.2%) against Robert Mitchel. He went on to win the general election with 6,553 (72.9%) against Democratic nominee Gary Wolfe.
- In 2018, Wilson ran for an open seat in the Delaware Senate, and won the general election with 10,816 (65.2%) against Democratic nominee James Purcell.

Delaware House of Representatives
Preceded by J. Benjamin Ewing	Member of the Delaware House of Representatives from the 35th district 2008–2018	Succeeded by Jesse Vanderwende
Delaware Senate
Preceded by Gary Simpson	Member of the Delaware Senate from the 18th district 2018–Present	Incumbent
