= Delaware's 6th Senate district =

American legislative district

Delaware's 6th State Senate district
Senator
Russ Huxtable; D–Lewes
- Registration: 40.2% Democratic; 34.8% Republican; 25.0% No party preference
- Demographics: 88% White; 5% Black; 4% Hispanic; 1% Asian; 1% Other
- Population (2018): 49,576
- Registered voters: 43,274

Delaware's 6th Senate district is one of 21 districts in the Delaware Senate. It has been represented by Democrat Russ Huxtable since 2023, succeeding Republican Ernesto López.

== Geography ==
District 6 is based in the Cape Region in coastal Sussex County, covering Rehoboth Beach, Lewes, Milton, and the surrounding communities.

Like all districts in the state, the 6th Senate district is located entirely within Delaware's at-large congressional district. It overlaps with the 14th, 20th, and 36th districts of the Delaware House of Representatives.

== Recent election results ==
Delaware Senators are elected to staggered four-year terms. Under normal circumstances, the 6th district holds elections in midterm years, except immediately after redistricting, when all seats are up for election regardless of usual cycle.

=== 2024 ===
Delaware Senate 6th district general election, 2024
Party	Candidate	Votes	%
Democratic	Russ Huxtable (incumbent)	20,211	54.35%
Republican	Kim Stevenson	16,976	45.65%
Total votes		37,188	100%
Democratic hold			

=== 2018 ===
2018 Delaware Senate election, District 6
Party	Candidate	Votes	%
Republican	Ernesto López (incumbent)	14,781	52.7
Democratic	David Baker	13,283	47.3
Total votes		28,064	100
Republican hold			

=== 2014 ===
2014 Delaware Senate election, District 6
Party	Candidate	Votes	%
Republican	Ernesto López (incumbent)	11,633	63.4
Democratic	Claire Snyder-Hall	6,718	36.6
Total votes		18,351	100
Republican hold			

=== 2012 ===
2012 Delaware Senate election, District 6
Primary election
Party	Candidate	Votes	%
Republican	Ernesto López	2,163	54.9
Republican	Glen Urquhart	1,779	45.1
Total votes		3,942	100
General election
Republican	Ernesto López	13,603	56.1
Democratic	Andrew Staton	10,352	42.7
Libertarian	Gwendolyn Jones	286	1.2
Total votes		24,241	100
Republican hold			

=== Federal and statewide results ===
Year	Office	Results
2020	President	Biden 54.5 – 44.4%
2016	President	Trump 49.7 – 46.7%
2014	Senate	Coons 51.4 – 47.2%
2012	President	Romney 50.3 – 48.6%
2012	Senate	Carper 54.6 – 35.8%
2012	Governor	Markell 62.9 – 35.4%
