= W. Charles Paradee =

American politician

Member of the Delaware Senate from the 17th district
- Incumbent
- Assumed office November 7, 2018
- Preceded by: Brian Bushweller

Member of the Delaware House of Representatives from the 29th district
- In office November 7, 2012 – November 7, 2018
- Preceded by: Lincoln Willis
- Succeeded by: William Bush IV

Personal details
- Born: July 18, 1969 (age 57) Dover, Delaware, U.S.
- Party: Democratic
- Education: University of Delaware

William Charles "Trey" Paradee III (born July 18, 1969) is an American politician and a Democratic member of the Delaware Senate representing district 17. He was a member of the Delaware House of Representatives from 2012 to 2018.

Paradee earned a BA in English and an MBA from the University of Delaware. He began his career working for his family's gas company before becoming a financial advisor in 2000. He founded his own financial firm, Paradee Financial LLC, in 2011.

== Legislation ==
In 2021, Paradee introduced legislation providing some students with full tuition and fees at Delaware State University.

Paradee is a supporter of campaign finance reform and sponsored SB 176, which established fines for candidates that fail to submit financial documents when running for state office.

== Electoral history ==
- In 2008, Paradee challenged incumbent Republican Pamela Thornburg, but lost the general election by 50 votes. Thornburg retired from the legislature at the end of this term.
- In 2012, Paradee challenged incumbent Republican Lincoln Willis, and won the general election with 5,183 votes (54.3%).
- In 2014, Paradee won the general election with 3,332 votes (57.4%) against Republican nominee Peter Kramer.
- In 2016, Paradee won the general election with 6,777 votes (62%) against Republican nominee Janice Gallagher and Green nominee Ruth James.
- In 2018, Paradee ran for an open seat in the Delaware Senate, and won the general election with 9,343 votes (64.3%) against Republican nominee Justin King.
- In 2022, Paradee defeated Republican nominee Ed Ruyter with 7,551 votes (64.4%) in the General Election.
- In 2024, Paradee was unopposed in the General Election.
