= Bryant Richardson =

American politician

Member of the Delaware Senate from the 21st district
- Incumbent
- Assumed office January 13, 2015
- Preceded by: Robert Venables Sr.

Personal details
- Party: Republican
- Profession: Publisher

Bryant Richardson is an American politician who is a Republican member of the Delaware Senate, where he has represented the 21st district since 2015.

== Electoral history ==
- Richardson ran in the 2012 election for Delaware State Senate District 21. He ran unopposed in the Republican primary on September 11, 2012, and was defeated by incumbent Robert Venables in the general election on November 6, 2012, with 6,889 votes (43.0%).
- Richardson ran in the 2014 election for Delaware State Senate District 21. He ran unopposed in the Republican Primary on September 9, 2014, and defeated incumbent Robert Venables in the general election on November 4, 2014, with 5,210 votes (53.0%).
- Richardson ran for reelection in the 2018 election for Delaware State Senate District 21. He was unopposed in the primary and defeated Democrat Bob Wheatley in the general election on November 6, 2018, with 8,816 votes (65%).
- Richardson ran in the 2020 Republican primary election for Governor of Delaware. He came in third place with 4,262 votes (7.7%) behind Colin Bonini (34.6%) and the eventual Republican nominee for governor, Julianne Murray (41.2%). Murray ultimately lost the general election to incumbent Governor, John Carney, after garnering 38.62% of the statewide vote.
