= David Sokola =

American politician (born 1955)

President pro tempore of the Delaware Senate
- Incumbent
- Assumed office November 4, 2020
- Preceded by: David McBride

Member of the Delaware Senate from the 8th district
- Incumbent
- Assumed office January 8, 1991
- Preceded by: Margo Ewing Bang

Personal details
- Born: July 28, 1955 (age 71) Wilmington, Delaware, U.S.
- Party: Democratic
- Education: University of Delaware (BS)
- Website: Official website

David P. Sokola (born July 28, 1955) is an American politician and a Democratic member of the Delaware Senate since 1991, representing District 8. He has served as President Pro Tempore since 2021. He currently serves, as chair of the Senate Executive Committee and the Joint Legislative Council Committee. He also serves as vice chair of the Senate Rules & Ethics Committee, and a member of the Senate Corrections & Public Safety, Education and Veterans Affairs committees. He earned a BS from the University of Delaware.

== Legislation ==
Sokola sponsored the Charter School Act of 1995, which provided for the creation of independent charter schools in Delaware. As of September 2025, there were 23 charter schools in the state.

Sokola supports the LGBTQ+ community and sponsored legislation prohibiting discrimination based on sexual orientation in housing, employment, and public accommodations. He was a Senate sponsor of HB 75, which legalized same-sex marriage in Delaware.

In 2022, Sokola introduced weapons-related bills aimed at prohibiting high-capacity magazines, defined as magazines that can hold 17 or more rounds of ammunition. and firearm converters.

== Elections ==
- 1990 When Republican Margo Ewing Bane retired and left the District 8 seat open, Sokola was unopposed for the 1990 Democratic Primary and won the November 6, 1990 General election with 6,738 votes (51%) against Republican nominee Frank Marx.
- 1992 Sokola was unopposed for the September 12, 1992 Democratic Primary and won the November 3, 1992 General election with 9,861 votes (62%) against Republican nominee Ronald Russo.
- 1996 Sokola was unopposed for the September 7, 1996 Democratic Primary and won the November 5, 1996 General election with 9,658 votes (61%) against Republican nominee Irwin Becnel.
- 2000 Sokola was unopposed for the September 9, 2000 Democratic Primary and won the November 7, 2000 General election with 9,873 votes (65.0%) against Republican nominee Paul Welsh.
- 2002 Sokola was unopposed for the September 10, 2002 Democratic Primary and won the November 5, 2002 General election with 6,411 votes (51.1%) against Republican nominee Michael Ramone.
- 2006 Sokola and Ramone were both unopposed for their September 12, 2006 primaries, setting up a rematch; Sokola won the November 7, 2006 General election with 7,678 votes (57.8%) against Ramone.
- 2010 Sokola was unopposed for the September 17, 2010 Democratic Primary and won the November 2, 2010 General election with 8,572 votes (60.6%) against Republican nominee A. Louis Saindon.
- 2012 Sokola was unopposed for the September 11, 2012 Democratic Primary and won the November 6, 2012 General election with 10,099 votes (60.7%) against Republican nominee William Stritzinger.
- 2016 Sokola was unopposed for the September 6, 2016 Democratic Primary and won the November 8, 2016 General election with 8,862 votes (50.8%) against Republican nominee Meredith Chapman and Green nominee David B. Chandler.

Delaware Senate
Preceded by David McBride	President pro tempore of the Delaware Senate; 2020–present	Incumbent
