= 2012 United States Senate election in Delaware =

- November 6, 2012
- Turnout: 62.7% (voting eligible)
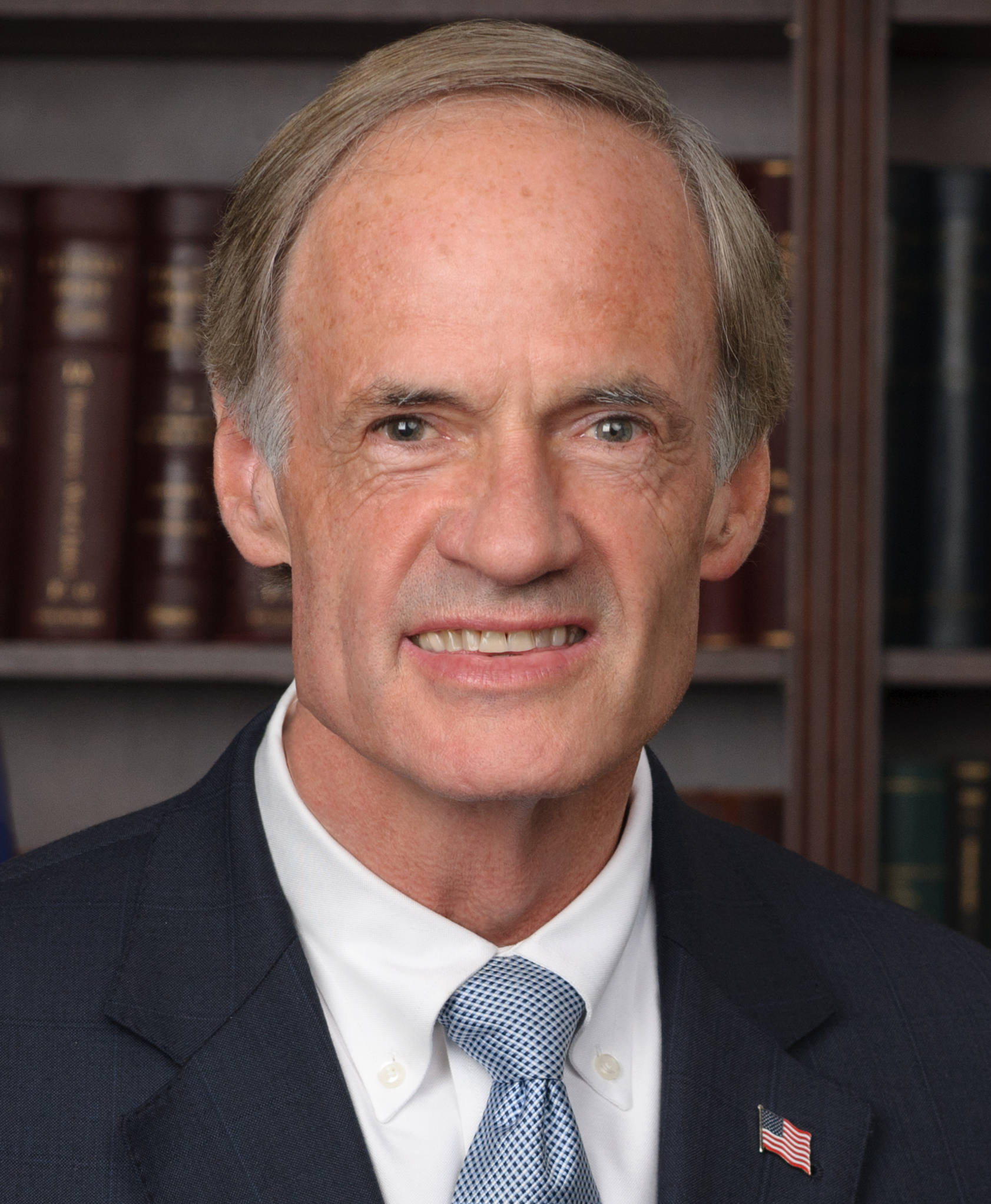

Nominee	Tom Carper	Kevin Wade
Party	Democratic	Republican
Popular vote	265,374	115,694
Percentage	66.42%	28.95%
- Carper: 40–50% 50–60% 60–70% 70–80% 80–90% >90%
U.S. senator before election
Tom Carper
Democratic
Elected U.S. Senator
Tom Carper
Democratic

The 2012 United States Senate election in Delaware took place on November 6, 2012, concurrently with the 2012 U.S. presidential election, other elections to the United States Senate and House of Representatives, and various state and local elections. Incumbent Democratic U.S. Senator Tom Carper won re-election to a third term in a landslide.

== Democratic primary ==
=== Candidates ===
==== Nominee ====
- Tom Carper, incumbent U.S. senator

==== Eliminated in primary ====
- Keith Spanarelli, businessman (no endorsement)

=== Results ===
Democratic primary results
Party	Candidate	Votes	%
Democratic	Tom Carper (incumbent)	43,587	87.9
Democratic	Keith Spanarelli	6,028	12.1
Total votes		49,615	100.0

== General election ==
=== Candidates ===
- Tom Carper (D), incumbent U.S. senator
- Andrew Groff (Green), businessman; also endorsed by the Libertarian Party
- Alex Pires (IPoD), businessman and attorney
- Kevin Wade (R), businessman

=== Debates ===
Only one debate was held between Carper, Wade, and Independent Party candidate Pires.

- Complete video of debate, October 16, 2012 - C-SPAN

=== Predictions ===
Source	Ranking	As of
The Cook Political Report	Solid D	November 1, 2012
Sabato's Crystal Ball	Safe D	November 5, 2012
Rothenberg Political Report	Safe D	November 2, 2012
Real Clear Politics	Safe D	November 5, 2012

=== Fundraising ===
Candidate (party)	Receipts	Disbursements	Cash on hand	Debt
Tom Carper (D)	$3,516,328	$3,462,004	$853,377	$0
Kevin Wade (R)	$181,367	$181,600	$11,500	-$234
Alex Pires (DI)	$414,343	$413,774	$278,925	$566
Source: Federal Election Commission

==== Top contributors ====
Tom Carper	Contribution	Kevin Wade	Contribution	Alexander Pires	Contribution
JPMorgan Chase & Co	$43,600	Defenders of Freedom	$10,000	Highway One	$10,525
AstraZeneca	$40,050	Friess Associates LLC	$10,000	Alloy Development	$4,000
Ashland Inc.	$38,730	Associates International	$6,000	Boston University	$2,750
Blackstone Group	$38,000	Trinity Logistics	$5,000	American Real Estate	$2,500
Wells Fargo	$30,500	Tiger Trading	$2,500	Gallo Realty	$2,500
DuPont	$29,600	Rollins Jamaica	$2,400	Community Bank of Delaware	$2,500
Discover Financial	$23,250	Fiat S.p.A.	$2,300	Redpeg Marketing	$2,500
NORPAC	$22,700	Janvier Jewelers	$2,000	Sodel Concepts	$2,500
Blue Cross Blue Shield Association	$20,800	Cover Rossiter, CPA	$1,500	Wdms	$2,500
Cigna	$20,000	Eastern States Group Construction	$1,000	Dc Bar Pro Bono Program	$2,400
Source: OpenSecrets

==== Top industries ====
Tom Carper	Contribution	Kevin Wade	Contribution	Alexander Pires	Contribution
Insurance industry	$388,910	Retired	$49,565	Real estate	$10,750
Lawyers/law firms	$313,010	Misc. issues	$20,000	Retired	$7,600
Financial institutions	$299,750	Financial institutions	$10,250	Lawyers/law firms	$6,600
Lobbyists	$218,695	Printing & publishing	$6,000	Misc. business	$6,250
Pharmaceuticals/health products	$199,950	Business services	$5,500	Universities	$4,250
Commercial banks	$193,940	Automotive industry	$3,300	Health professionals	$2,000
Chemical industry	$165,757	Tourism	$2,400	Entertainment industry	$1,750
Leadership PACs	$162,500	Accounting firms	$1,500	Printing & publishing	$1,000
Health professionals	$147,450	Lawyers/law firms	$1,250	Food & beverage	$1,000
Retired	$136,700	General contractors	$1,000	Commercial banks	$800
Source: OpenSecrets

=== Results ===
United States Senate election in Delaware, 2012
Party	Candidate	Votes	%	±%
Democratic	Tom Carper (incumbent)	265,415	66.42%	−0.71%
Republican	Kevin Wade	115,700	28.95%	+1.51%
Independent Party	Alex Pires	15,300	3.83%	N/A
Green	Andrew Groff	3,191	0.80%	N/A
Total votes		399,606	100.00%	N/A
Democratic hold				

==== By county ====
County	Tom Carper Democratic		Kevin Wade Republican		All others	
County	#	%	#	%	#	%
Kent	40,750	61.47	22,561	34.03	2,979	4.49
New Castle	177,244	72.99	56,666	23.34	8,926	3.67
Sussex	47,421	52.41	36,473	40.31	6,587	7.28
Totals	265,415	66.42	115,700	28.95	18,492	4.63

== See also ==
- 2012 United States Senate elections
- 2012 United States House of Representatives election in Delaware
- 2012 Delaware gubernatorial election
