= Delaware Senate =

Upper house of the Delaware General Assembly

Delaware State Senate
- Delaware General Assembly

Type
- Type: Upper house
- Term limits: None

History
- New session started: January 10, 2023

Leadership
- President: Kyle Evans Gay (D) since January 21, 2025
- President pro tempore: David Sokola (D) since November 4, 2020
- Majority Leader: Bryan Townsend (D) since November 4, 2020
- Minority Leader: Gerald Hocker (R) since November 7, 2018

Structure
- Seats: 21
- Political groups: Majority: Democratic (15); Minority: Republican (6)
- Length of term: 4 years
- Authority: Article III, Section 1, Delaware Constitution
- Salary: $48,237/year

Elections
- Last election: November 5, 2024 (10 seats)
- Next election: November 3, 2026 (11 seats)
- Redistricting: Legislative control

Meeting place
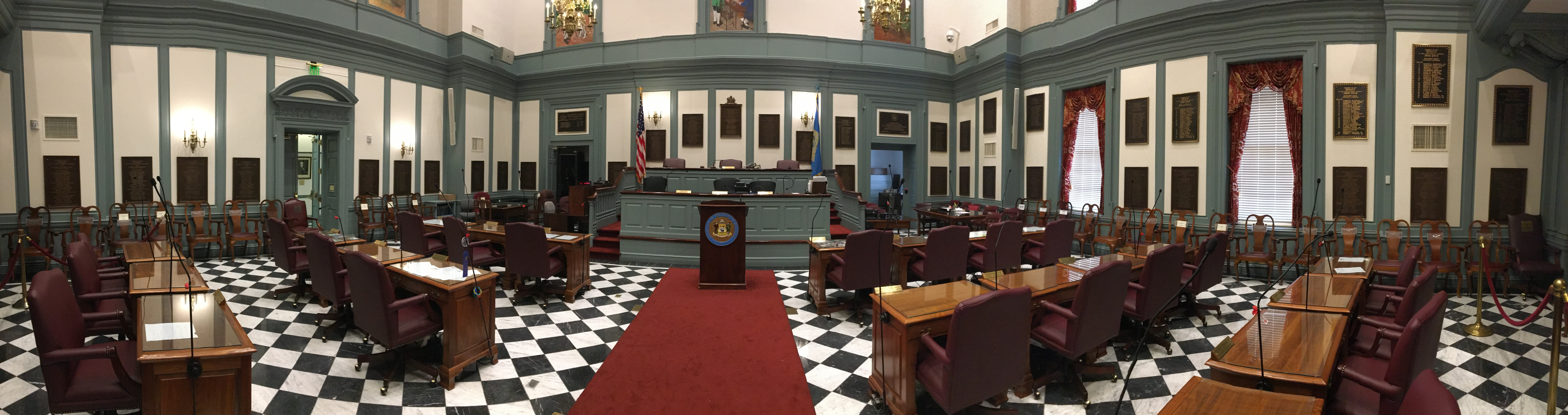
- State Senate Chamber; Delaware Legislative Hall; Dover, Delaware

Website
- Delaware State Senate

The Delaware State Senate is the upper house of the Delaware General Assembly, the state legislature of the U.S. state of Delaware. It is composed of 21 Senators, each of whom is elected to a four-year term, except when reapportionment occurs, at which time Senators may be elected to a two-year term. There is no limit to the number of terms that a Senator may serve. The Delaware Senate meets at the Legislative Hall in Dover.

In order to accommodate the ten-year cycle of reapportionment, the terms of office of the several Senators are staggered so that ten Senators are elected to terms of two years at the first biennial general election following reapportionment, followed by two four-year terms, and eleven Senators are elected at the said election for two four-year terms, followed by a two-year term.

Like other upper houses of state and territorial legislatures and the federal U.S. Senate, the Senate can confirm or reject gubernatorial appointments to the state cabinet, commissions, boards, or justices to the Delaware Supreme Court.

== Qualifications ==
Senators must be citizens of the United States, have lived in Delaware for three years, and have been a resident of their respective district for at least one year preceding their election. They must also be at least 27 years old at the time of their election.

== Senate leadership ==
The Lieutenant Governor of Delaware serves as the President of the Senate, but only casts a vote if required to break a tie. In the absence of the lieutenant governor, the President Pro Tempore presides over the Senate. The President Pro Tempore is elected by the majority party caucus followed by confirmation of the entire Senate through a Senate Resolution. The President Pro Tempore is the chief leadership position in the Senate. The other Senate leaders are elected by their respective party caucuses.

Position	Name	Party	District
President of the Senate/Lieutenant Governor	Kyle Evans Gay	Democratic	N/A
President Pro Tem	David Sokola	Democratic	8
Majority Leader	Bryan Townsend	Democratic	11
Majority Whip	Elizabeth Lockman	Democratic	3
Minority Leader	Gerald Hocker	Republican	20
Minority Whip	Brian G. Pettyjohn	Republican	19

== Composition ==
Affiliation	Party (Shading indicates majority caucus)		Total	Vacant
Affiliation	Democratic	Republican	Total	Vacant
End of previous session	15	6	21	0
November 4, 2026	15	6	21	0
Latest voting share	71.4%	28.6%		

=== Members ===
Below are the Senators as of the 153rd General Assembly (2024–2026), following the most recent election.

District	Name	Party	Start	Residence	Next Election
1st	Dan Cruce	Dem	2025	Wilmington	2026
2nd	Darius J. Brown	Dem	2018	Wilmington	2028
3rd	Elizabeth Lockman	Dem	2018	Wilmington	2028
4th	Laura Sturgeon	Dem	2018	Brandywine Hundred	2028
5th	Ray Seigfried	Dem	2025	Arden	2026
6th	Russ Huxtable	Dem	2022	Lewes	2028
7th	Spiros Mantzavinos	Dem	2020	Westgate Farms	2026
8th	David Sokola	Dem	1990	Newark	2026
9th	Jack Walsh	Dem	2016	Newport	2026
10th	Stephanie Hansen	Dem	2017	Middletown	2028
11th	Bryan Townsend	Dem	2012	Westover Woods	2028
12th	Nicole Poore	Dem	2012	Barbs Farm	2026
13th	Marie Pinkney	Dem	2020	New Castle County	2026
14th	Kyra Hoffner	Dem	2022	Leipsic	2026
15th	David G. Lawson	Rep	2010	Marydel	2026
16th	Eric Buckson	Rep	2022	Camden	2028
17th	W. Charles Paradee	Dem	2018	Dover	2028
18th	David L. Wilson	Rep	2018	Lincoln	2028
19th	Brian G. Pettyjohn	Rep	2012	Georgetown	2026
20th	Gerald Hocker	Rep	2012	Ocean View	2026
21st	Bryant Richardson	Rep	2014	Laurel	2028

== See also ==
- List of Delaware state senators (1776–1831)
- Delaware House of Representatives
