= Timeline of Wilmington, Delaware =

The following is a timeline of the history of the city of Wilmington, Delaware, United States.

== Prior to 19th century ==
- 1638
  - March 29: Peter Minuit and others arrive at what is known today as Swedes' Landing, in the Swedish colony of New Sweden.
  - Fort Christina built on behalf of the Swedish South Company; settlement known as Christinaham.
- 1655 - Fort taken from Swedes by Dutch forces of Peter Stuyvesant.
- 1664 - English in power.
- 1682 - New Sweden becomes part of the English colonial Province of Pennsylvania.
- 1698 - Holy Trinity Church (Old Swedes) built.
- 1731 - Landowner Thomas Willing names his property "Willingtown" (renamed "Wilmington" around 1739).
- 1739
  - William Shipley becomes burgess of Wilmington.
  - Shipbuilding industry begins (approximate date).
- 1740 - First Presbyterian Church built.
- 1748 - Wilmington Friends School established.
- 1777 - September 11: Battle of Brandywine fought near town.
- 1785 - Delaware Gazette newspaper begins publication.
- 1788 - Wilmington Library Company founded.
- 1798
  - Yellow fever outbreak.
  - Town Hall built.

== 19th century ==
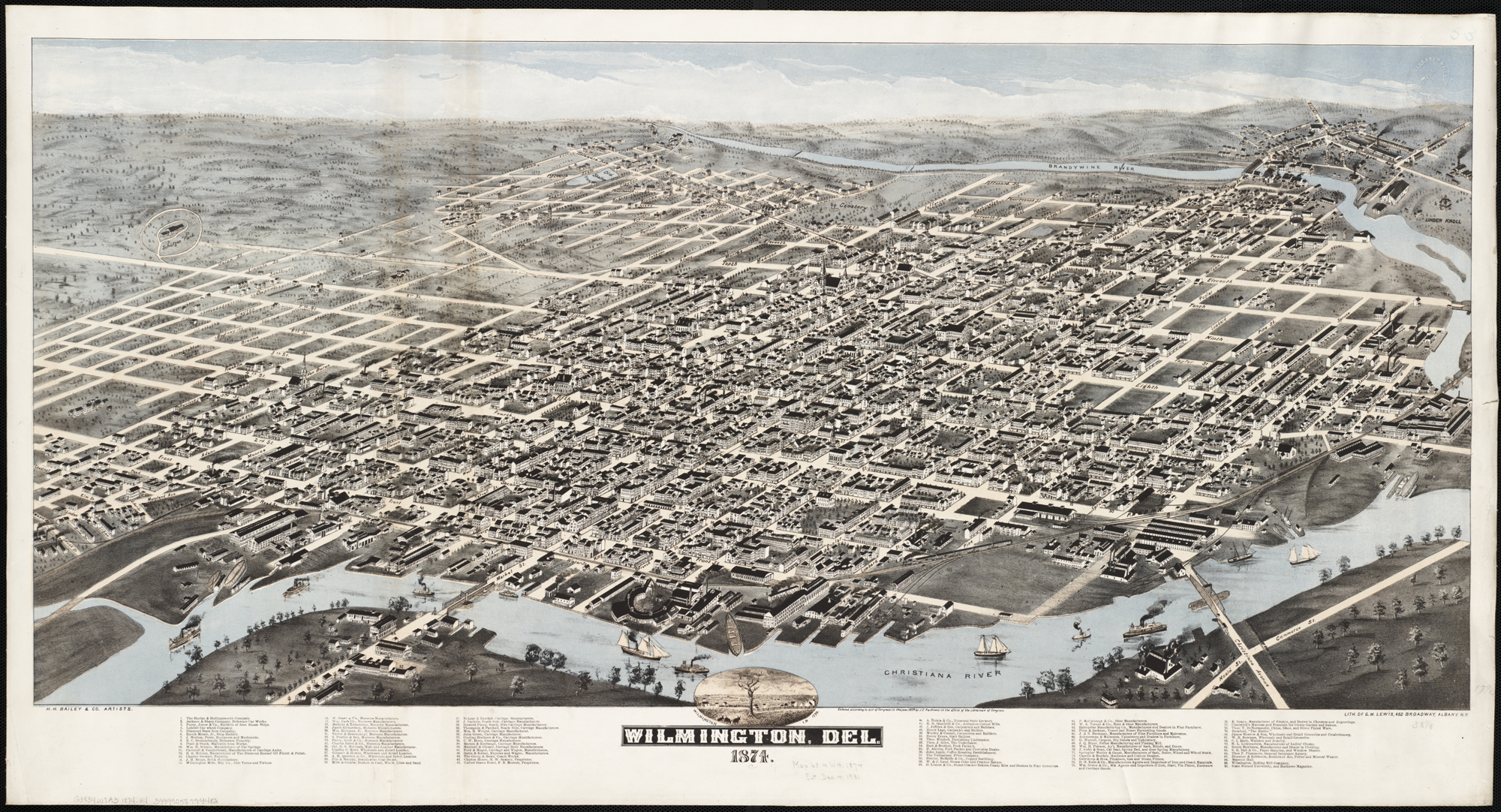
Map of Wilmington, Delaware, 1874

- 1802 - DuPont gunpowder manufacturer in business at Eleutherian Mills on Brandywine Creek near Wilmington.
- 1809 - Borough of Wilmington expanded.
- 1814 - Harmonic Society formed.
- 1824 - "First public opinion poll" taken in Wilmington during the U.S. presidential election campaign.
- 1832
  - Borough of Wilmington becomes a city per state charter.
  - Richard H. Bayard becomes city mayor.
- 1835 - Wilmington Whaling Company incorporated.
- 1837
  - Board of Trade and Wesleyan Female Seminary established.
  - Betts, Pusey & Harlan railcar manufactory in business.
- 1838 - Philadelphia, Wilmington and Baltimore Railroad begins operating.
- 1840
  - Democratic Free Press newspaper begins publication.
  - Population: 8,367.
- 1849 - Harlan and Hollingsworth shipbuilder and railcar manufactory in business.
- 1855 - Customshouse built.
- 1864
  - Horse-drawn railway begins operating.
  - Historical Society of Delaware headquartered in Wilmington.
  - John Merrick House built.
- 1868 - Roman Catholic Diocese of Wilmington established.
- 1871 - Grand Opera House built.
- 1877 - Wilmington Club for men incorporated.
- 1880 – Population: 42,478.
- 1881 - New Castle County Court House built.
- 1886 - Brandywine Park established.
- 1889 - Rockford Park and New Century Club for women established.
- 1890
  - Delaware Hospital opens.
  - Population: 61,431.
- 1900 – Population: 76,508.

== 20th century ==
- 1905 - Brandywine Zoo established.
- 1910 – Population: 87,411.
- 1911 - Majestic Theatre opens.
- 1917 - Rodney Square established.
- 1919 - Wilmington, Delaware race riot of 1919
- 1920 – Population: 110,168.
- 1921 - City fire department established.
- 1922 - WDEL and WILM radio begin broadcasting.
- 1923
  - Wilmington Marine Terminal built.
  - Monument to Caesar Rodney installed in Rodney Square.
- 1928 - Rodney Court apartment building constructed.
- 1929 - Wilmington Dry Goods in business.
- 1930 - Population: 106,597.
- 1937 - Main Post Office built.
- 1942 - Crest Theater in business.
- 1950 – Population: 110,356.
- 1961 - Burton v. Wilmington Parking Authority lawsuit decided by U.S. Supreme Court, broadening the Equal Protection Clause of the U.S. Constitution's 14th Amendment.
- 1965 - Wilmington Medical Center active.
- 1968 - Wilmington Riot of 1968
- 1981 - State legislature passes the "liberalizing" Financial Center Development Act, influencing the relocation of many banks to the Wilmington area.
- 1991 - Cinemark cinema in business.
- 1995 - MBNA Corporation headquartered in city.
- 1996 - City website online (approximate date).

== 21st century ==
- 2001 - James M. Baker becomes mayor.
- 2013 - Dennis P. Williams becomes mayor.
- 2024 - John Carney becomes mayor.

== See also ==
- Wilmington, Delaware history
- List of mayors of Wilmington, Delaware
- National Register of Historic Places listings in Wilmington, Delaware

== Bibliography ==
=== Published in the 18th–19th c. ===
- Jedidiah Morse (1797). "Wilmington". The American Gazetteer. Boston: S. Hall, and Thomas & Andrews. OL 23272543M.
- Charter and Ordinances of the City of Wilmington, Delaware. 1863.
- Wm. H. Boyd, ed. (1874). "Wilmington City Directory". Delaware State Directory and Gazetteer. The Commercial printing company. hdl:2027/mdp.39015010204223.
- Charles P. Dare (1877), "Wilmington", Philadelphia, Wilmington and Baltimore Railroad Guide Book, OCLC 37266637 – via Internet Archive
- John Thomas Scharf (1888). History of Delaware: 1609-1888. Philadelphia: L. J. Richards & Co. LCCN 01013423.
- "Wilmington (1.)" . Encyclopædia Britannica. Vol. 24 (9th ed.). 1888.

=== Published in the 20th c. ===
- "Wilmington (Delaware)" . Encyclopædia Britannica. Vol. 28 (11th ed.). 1910. p. 690.
- Charter of the City of Wilmington. Star Printing Company. 1911.
- Edward Noble Vallandigham (1922). "Wilmington". Delaware and the Eastern Shore: Some Aspects of a Peninsula Pleasant and Well Beloved. J. B. Lippincott Company.
- Anna T. Lincoln (1937). Wilmington, Delaware; three centuries under four flags, 1609-1937. Rutland, Vt.: Tuttle – via HathiTrust. (fulltext)
- Federal Writers' Project (1938). "Wilmington". Delaware: A Guide to the First State. American Guide Series. New York: Viking. ISBN 9781603540087 – via Google Books. + chronology
- Greater Wilmington Development Council (1962). Wilmington area research: an annotated list of research reports and selected data sources for the Wilmington Metropolitan area. University of Delaware, Division of Urban Affairs – via HathiTrust. (fulltext)
- Carol Hoffecker (1974). Wilmington, Delaware: Portrait of an Industrial City, 1830-1910. University Press of Virginia – via State of Delaware, Delaware Public Archives. (fulltext)
- David W. Singleton (1975). "Firefighting Productivity in Wilmington: A Case History". Public Productivity Review. 1 (2): 19–29. doi:10.2307/3380139. JSTOR 3380139.
- Carol Hoffecker (1982). Wilmington: a Pictorial History. Donning Company – via State of Delaware, Delaware Public Archives. (fulltext)
- Carol Hoffecker (1983). Corporate Capital: Wilmington in the Twentieth Century. Philadelphia: Temple University Press – via State of Delaware, Delaware Public Archives. (fulltext)
- Priscilla M. Thompson; Sally O'Byrne (1999). Wilmington's Waterfront. Arcadia. ISBN 978-1-4396-2724-2.
- Marjorie G. McNinch (2000). Wilmington in Vintage Postcards. Arcadia. ISBN 978-0-7385-0647-0.

=== Published in the 21st c. ===
- Ellen Rendle (2010). New Castle County. Arcadia. ISBN 978-0-7385-8557-4.
