= Purzycki =

Purzycki (Polish pronunciation: Polish pronunciation: [puˈʐɨtski]; feminine: Purzycka; plural: Purzyccy) is a surname. It may refer to:

- Adrian Purzycki (born 1997), Polish football player
- Joe Purzycki (born 1947), American football coach
- Mick Purzycki (born 1987), American internet entrepreneur
- Mike Purzycki (born 1945), American businessman and politician
