= 2012 Wilmington mayoral election =

- November 6, 2012
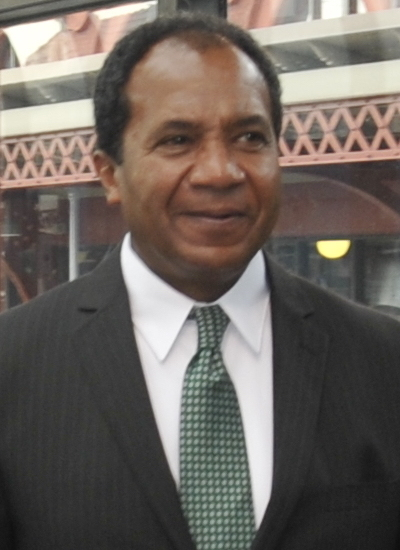
Nominee	Dennis P. Williams
Party	Democratic
Popular vote	25,605
Percentage	100%
Mayor before election
James Baker
Democratic
Elected mayor
Dennis P. Williams
Democratic

The 2012 Wilmington mayoral election was held on Tuesday, November 6, 2012, to elect the mayor of Wilmington, Delaware, United States. Incumbent mayor James Baker was ineligible to run again because of term limits.

Democratic Party primaries were held on September 11, 2012, and won by Dennis P. Williams. Williams faced a write-in campaign from Kevin Melloy in the general election. Williams won the general election.

== Democratic primary ==
=== Candidates ===
- Robert Bovell, bail bondsman
- Kevin Kelley, City Councilman
- Bill Montgomery, chief of staff to Mayor Baker
- Scott Spencer, transportation consultant
- Dennis P. Williams, state Representative for the 1st district

==== Withdrew ====
- Paul Calistro, Jr., nonprofit director
- Selara Gatewood
- Derrick Johnson, pastor
- Robert Marshall, state Senator for the 3rd district

=== Results ===
Democratic primary results
Party	Candidate	Votes	%
Democratic	Dennis P. Williams	4,244	38.5
Democratic	Kevin Kelley	3,136	28.5
Democratic	Bill Montgomery	2,290	20.8
Democratic	Robert Bovell	1,027	9.3
Democratic	Scott Spencer	317	2.9
Total votes		11,014	100

== Republican primary ==
=== Candidates ===
==== Disqualified from ballot, running as write-in candidate ====
- Kevin Melloy, real estate agent

==== Withdrew ====
- Mike Brown, City Councilman

== General election ==
=== Candidates ===
- Dennis P. Williams (D), state Representative for the 1st district

=== Results ===
Wilmington mayoral election, 2012
Party	Candidate	Votes	%
Democratic	Dennis P. Williams	25,605	100
Democratic hold			
