= Chase Manhattan =

Chase Manhattan most frequently refers to Chase Bank, especially prior to its merger with J.P. Morgan & Co. to form JPMorgan Chase.

Chase Manhattan may also refer to:

- 1201 North Market Street, Wilmington, Delaware, formerly Chase Manhattan Centre
- Bank of the Manhattan Company Building (disambiguation), several buildings in New York City
- Chase Manhattan Bank NA v Israel-British Bank (London) Ltd, an English trusts law case concerning constructive trusts
