= List of tallest buildings in Wilmington =

Wilmington, the largest city in Delaware, is located at the Brandywine Creek and Christina River, which flows into the Delaware River. Wilmington is a major city in the Philadelphia metropolitan area. Currently, Wilmington has 15 buildings that surpass 200 feet. Its current tallest building is 1201 North Market Street, at 360 ft (110 m).

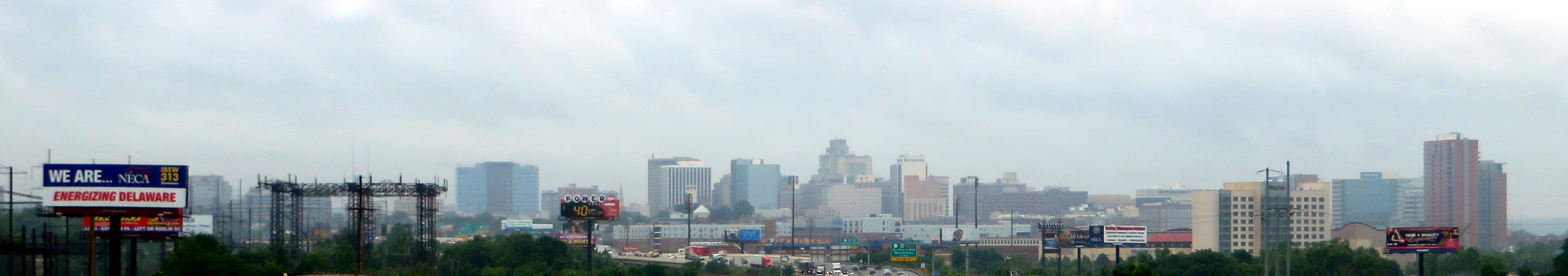
Wilmington is Delaware's largest city with 14 buildings that surpass 200 ft (61 m) and 1 that surpasses 300 ft (91 m).

The Wilmington skyline, as seen from I-495

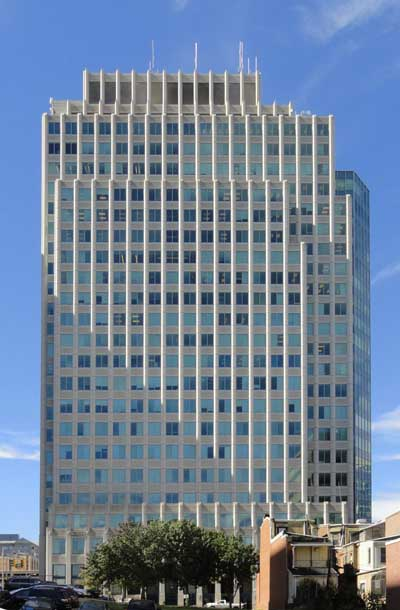
Since its completion in 1988, The Chase Manhattan Centre is the tallest building in both Wilmington and the state of Delaware.

The River Tower at Christina Landing is the tallest residential building in Wilmington.

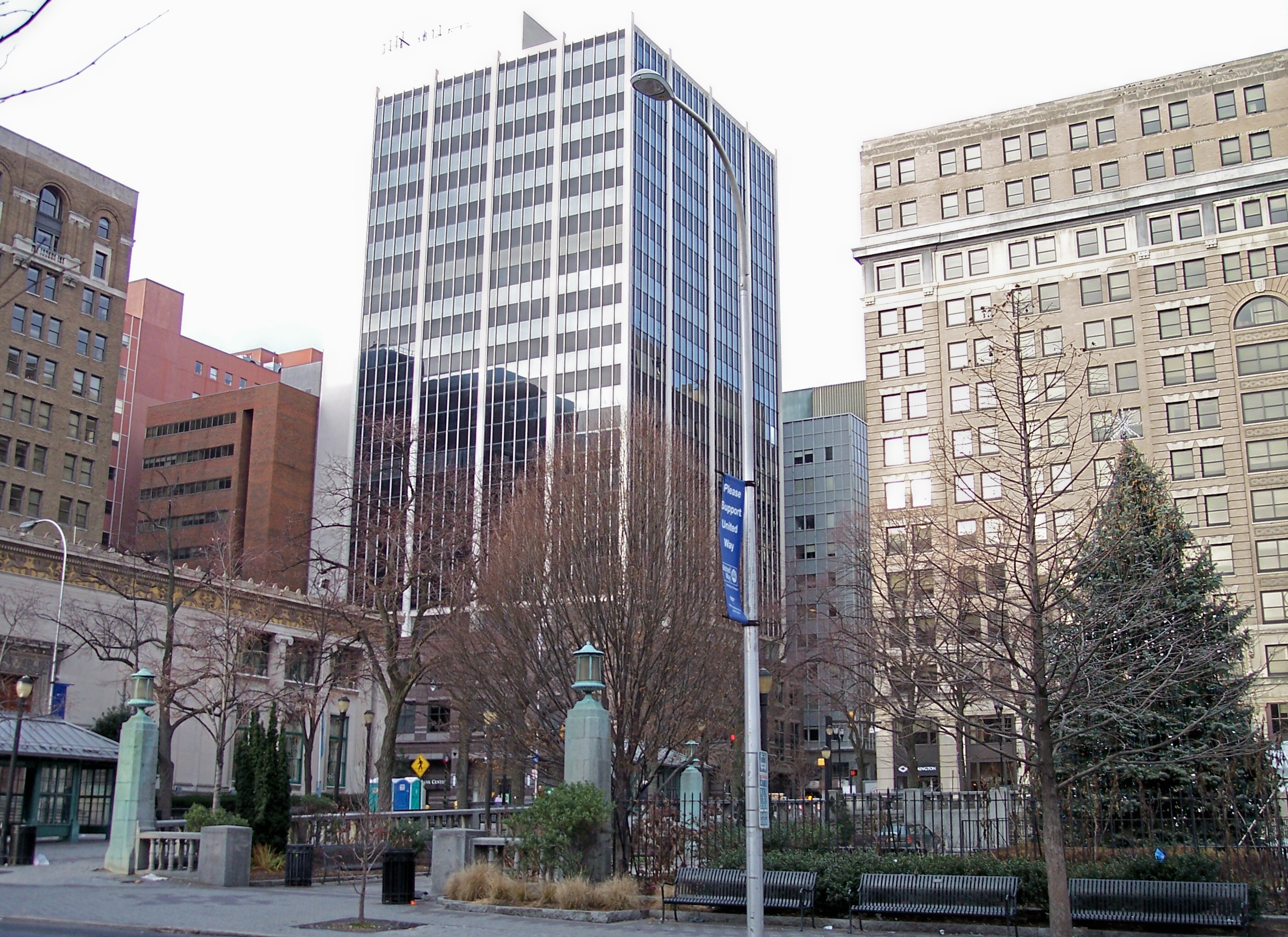
Rodney Square in downtown Wilmington, with the DuPont Building (right) shown with the Citizens Bank Center (middle) and the Wilmington Public Library (left).

== Tallest buildings ==
These are the top 20 tallest buildings in Wilmington:

Rank	Name	Image	Height ft / m	Floors	Year	Primary Purpose	Notes
1	1201 North Market Street		360 ft. (110 m.)	23	1988	Office	Tallest building in Wilmington and Delaware; tallest office building in Wilmington
2	River Tower at Christina Landing		295 ft. (90 m.)	27	2007	Residential	2nd Tallest building in Wilmington and Delaware; tallest residential building in Wilmington
3	I.M. Pei Building		282 feet (86 m)	23	1971	Office	3rd tallest building in Wilmington; Contains most international companies in Wilmington.
4	Brandywine Building		259 feet (79 m)	20	1970	Office	4th tallest building in Wilmington; Part of DuPont's Headquarters until 2000.
5	Citizens Bank Center		253 feet (77 m)	20	1972	Office	5th tallest building in Wilmington; Formally known as Mellon Bank Center
6	Park Plaza Condominiums		250 feet (76 m)	18	1965	Residential	6th tallest building in Wilmington; 2nd tallest residential building in Wilmington.
7	PNC Bank Building		246 feet (75 m)	18	1987	Office	7th tallest building in Wilmington; Mostly occupied by PNC Bank.
8	The Residences at Christina Landing		241 feet (73 m)	22	2005	Residential	8th tallest building in Wilmington; 2nd tallest building in the Christina Landing complex.
9	WSFS Bank Center		237 feet (72 m)	15	2006	Office	9th tallest building in Wilmington; WSFS Bank's Headquarters.
10	300 Delaware Avenue		230 feet (70 m)	17	1970	Office	10th tallest building in Wilmington; Mostly owned by TD Bank.
11	One Christina Centre		229 feet (70 m)	18	1988	Office	11th tallest building in Wilmington; Tallest Building in Chase's complex in Wilmington.
12	Three Christina Centre		226 feet (69 m)	14	1988	Office	12th tallest building in Wilmington; Second Tallest Building in Chase's complex in Wilmington.
13	Wilmington Trust Center		223 feet (68 m)	15	1985	Office	13th tallest building in Wilmington; Wilmington Trust's Headquarters.
14	Hercules Plaza		214 feet (65 m)	12	1982	Mixed-use	14th tallest building in Wilmington; largest building by square foot in Wilmington
15	Sheraton Suites Hotel		205 feet (62 m)	16	-	Hotel	15th tallest building in Wilmington; tallest hotel in Wilmington.
16	Bank of Delaware Building		191 feet (58 m)	16	-	Office	16th tallest building in Wilmington; Located next to Citizens Bank Center.
17	The Park View		190 feet (58 m)	15	-	Residential	17th tallest building in Wilmington; Tallest building in North Wilmington.
18	Nemours Building		162 feet (49 m)	16	1936	Office	18th tallest building in Wilmington; formerly owned by DuPont.
19	Delaware Trust Building		160 feet (49 m)	15	1927	Mixed Use	19th tallest building in Wilmington; This building features offices, condos, and retail.
20	DuPont Building		156 feet (48 m)	13	1908	Office	20th tallest building in Wilmington; Owned by Chemours, a spin-off from DuPont.

== Timeline of tallest buildings in Wilmington ==
Here are the buildings that were once the tallest in Wilmington:

Name	Image	Height ft / m	Floors	Type	Years tallest	Notes
DuPont Building		156 feet (48 m)	14	Mixed-use	1908-1936	Formerly owned by DuPont, now occupied by Chemours.
Nemours Building		162 feet (49 m)	16	Office	1936-1960	Tallest building in Wilmington until the completion of the Hercules Tower
Hercules Tower (Wilmington)		287 feet (87 m)	22	Office	1960-1988	Tallest building in Wilmington until the completion of 1201 North Market Street; demolished in 2003
1201 North Market Street		360 ft. (110m.)	23	Office	1988-2007	First building in Wilmington to surpass 300 feet; tallest building in Wilmington.

== Tallest under construction ==
Here are the tallest buildings that are under construction in Wilmington:

Rank	Name	Image	Height ft / m	Floors	Type	Estimated completion	Notes
1	The Residence at Mid-town Park		?	9	Residential	2020	This complex will feature 1, 9 story building and 2, 4 story buildings.
2	Crosby Hill Apartments			11	Residential	2022	This Complex will feature 1, 11 story building and 2, 4 story buildings.

== Tallest proposed, canceled, and approved ==
Here are the tallest buildings that are proposed, canceled, or approved in Wilmington:

Rank	Name	Image	Height ft / m	Floors	Type	Status	Estimated completion if built	Notes
1	Hercules Building		602 feet (183 m)	42	Mixed Use	Canceled	-	Replaced by Hercules Plaza.
2	1001-1011 Jefferson Street		510 feet (160 m)	35	Mixed Use	Vision		If built, this will become the new tallest building in Wilmington and Delaware.
3	Star States Tower		400 feet (120 m)	25	Office	Canceled	-	If built, this building would have become the tallest building in Wilmington, surpassing the 360 ft 1201 North Market Street.
4	2 Christina Center		290 feet (88 m)	23 (Estimated)	Office	Proposed	2020	If built, this will become the 3rd tallest building in Wilmington. It might be rescaled taller.

== Tallest demolished ==
Here are the tallest buildings in Wilmington that were demolished:

Rank	Name	Image	Height ft / m	Floors	Type	Year demolished	Notes
1	Hercules Tower (Wilmington)		287 feet (87 m)	22	Mixed-use	2003	Demolished during conversion of Delaware Trust Building to residential use.
2	Industrial Trust Building		113 feet (34 m)	9	Office	1996	Demolished to make room for the Community Services Building

== See also ==
- List of tallest buildings in the United States
- List of tallest buildings by U.S. state
- Wilmington, Delaware
