= Wilmington Public Library, Delaware =

Public library in Delaware

Coordinates: 39.7452°N 75.5475°W

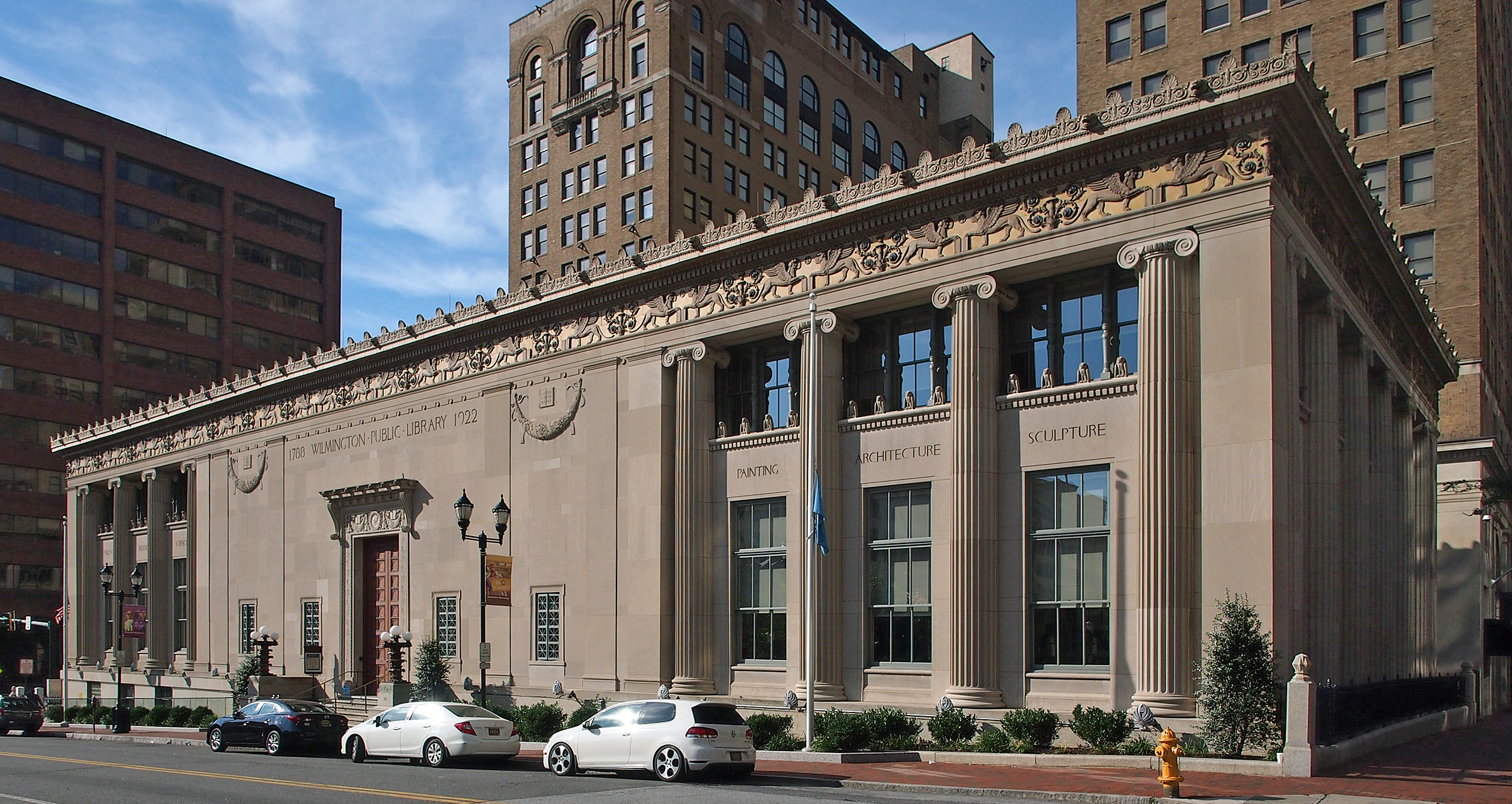

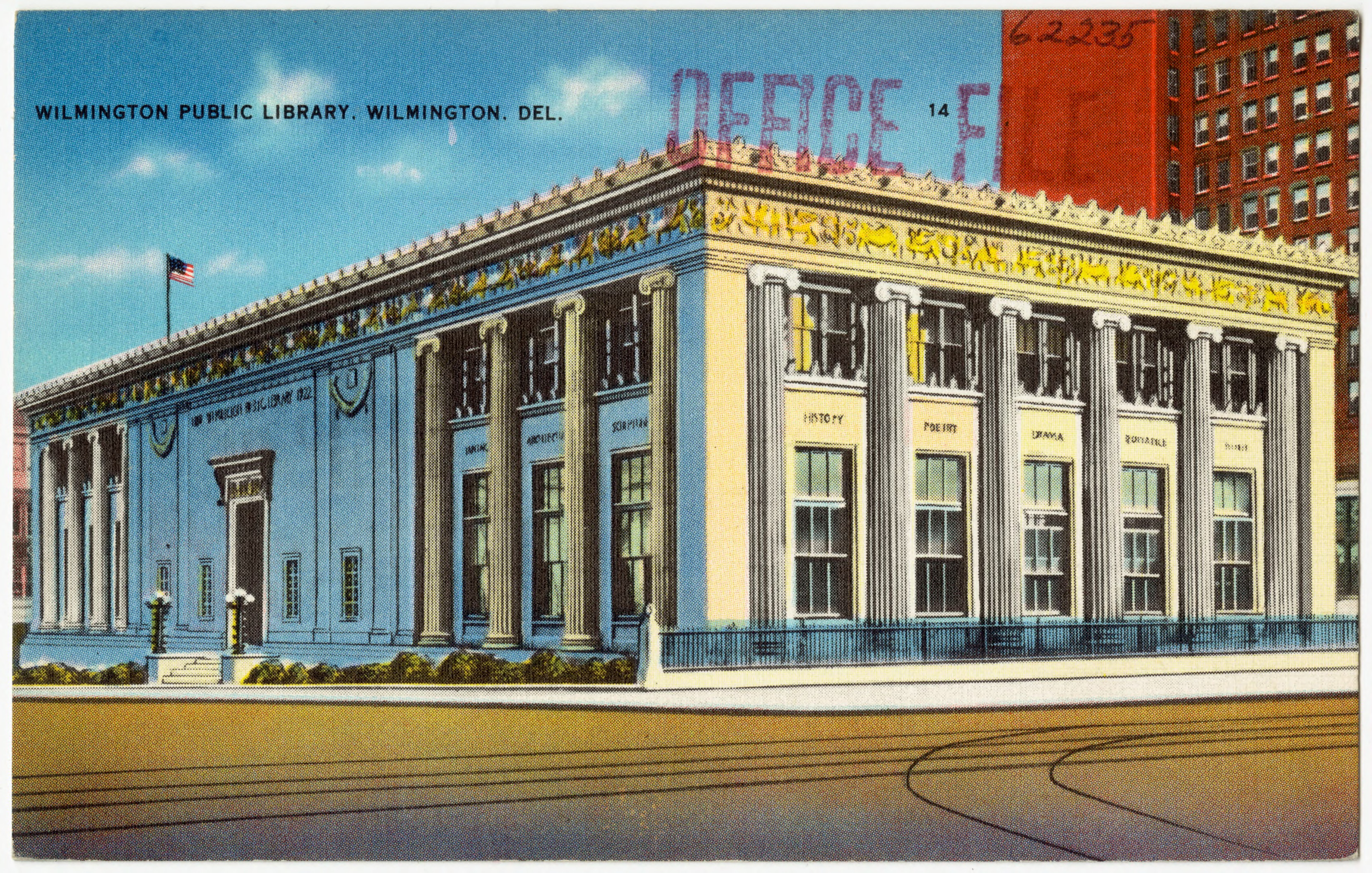
Postcard

The Wilmington Public Library, also known as the Wilmington Institute Free Library, is in Wilmington, Delaware. It received the National Medal for Museum and Library Service. Books on its opening, history, and holdings have been published. It is at 10 East 10th Street. The library is in the Rodney Square Historic District.

Wilmington Library Company was founded in 1788.

Originally established as a private lending library, Wilmington Institute became a free public library known as Wilmington Institute. It was built on the site of First Presbyterian Church, which relocated, and its cemetery. Designed by Edward L. Tilton and Alfred Morton Githens, a library building was constructed for it from 1921-1923. Interior alterations were made form 1969-1971.

A book truck was photographed outside the library in 1929.

In 2024, Al Roker and his daughter were speakers at the library. Michael Vick's scheduled appearance at the library in February 2025 was controversial.

== See also ==
- Timeline of Wilmington, Delaware
- National Register of Historic Places listings in Wilmington, Delaware
