= Wilmington Public Library =

Wilmington Public Library may refer to:

- Wilmington Public Library, Delaware, in Wilmington, Delaware
- Wilmington Public Library (Ohio), in Wilmington, Ohio
