= Rodney Square =

- Rodney Square Historic District
- U.S. National Register of Historic Places
- U.S. Historic district
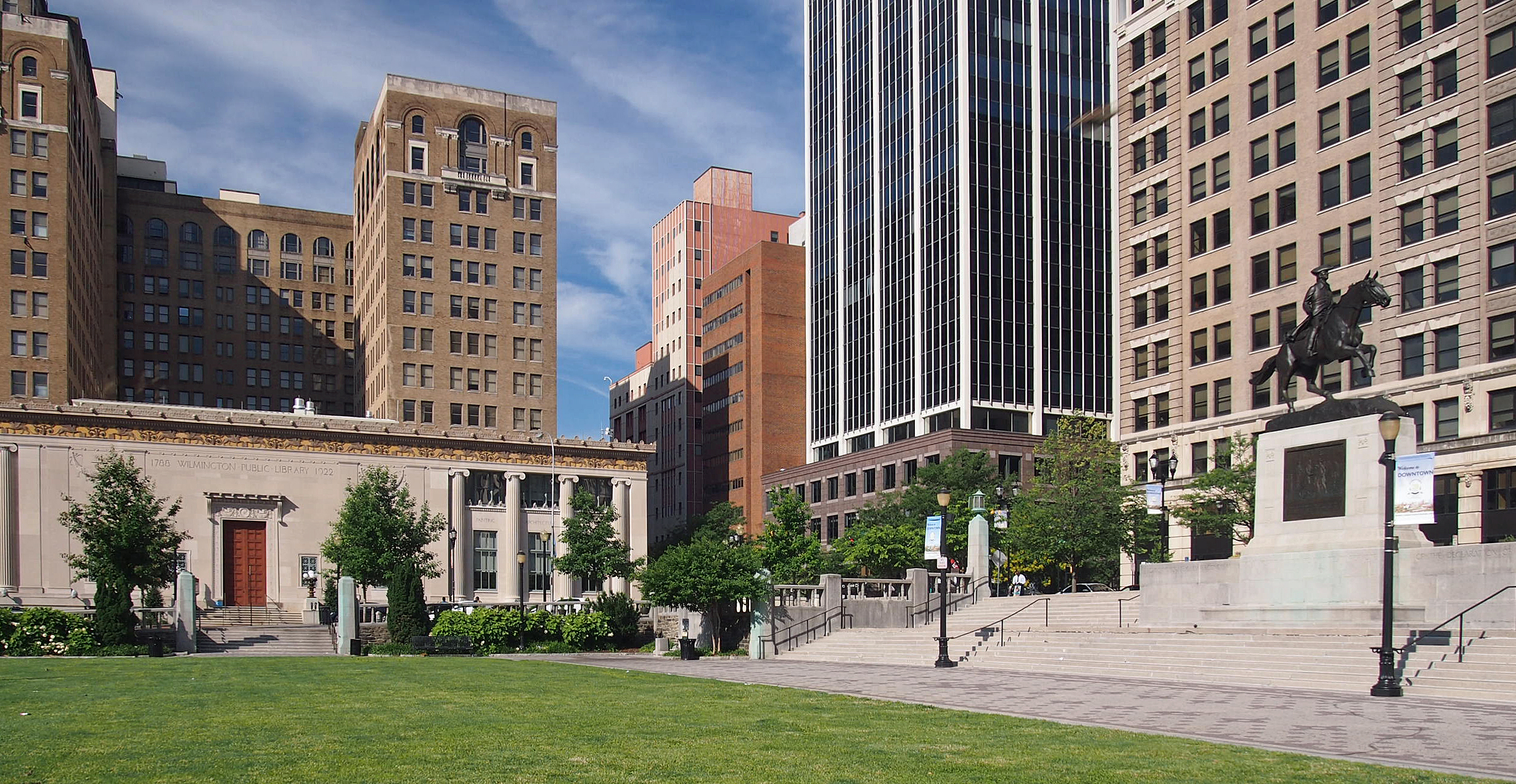
- The northwest corner of Rodney Square
- Location: Buildings fronting Rodney Square at 10th, 11th, Market & King Sts., Wilmington, Delaware
- Coordinates: 39°44′45″N 75°32′49″W
- Architectural style: Beaux-Art, Moderne
- NRHP reference No.: 11000522
- Designated HD: August 10, 2011

Rodney Square is the public square and historic district in downtown Wilmington, Delaware, United States, named after American Revolutionary leader Caesar Rodney. A large equestrian statue of Rodney by James E. Kelly formerly stood in the front of the square until it was removed in 2020. The square was created in the early 20th century by John Jacob Raskob, who worked for Pierre S. du Pont. The City Beautiful movement served as the inspiration for the effort.

In 1917, to make room for the Wilmington Public Library in the square, the 18th-century First Presbyterian Church was moved to Park Drive and the remains in the cemetery were reinterred in Wilmington and Brandywine Cemetery.

It was listed on the National Register of Historic Places in 2011, as the Rodney Square Historic District.

== Events ==
- Clifford Brown Jazz Festival
- First Night Wilmington
- Saint Patrick's Day Parade
- Citizens Bank Caesar Rodney Half Marathon

== Surrounding architecture ==
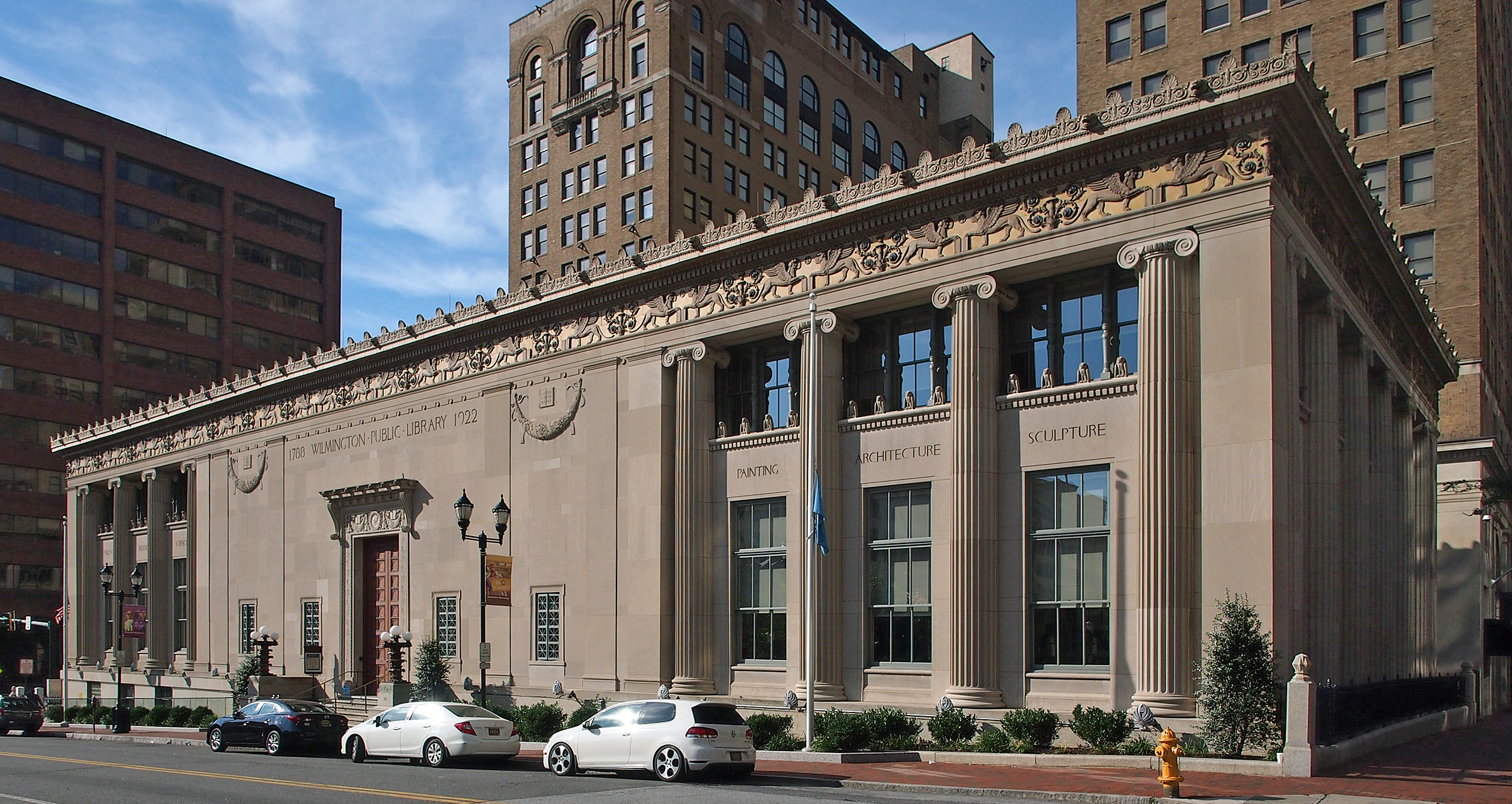
Wilmington Public Library on Rodney Square

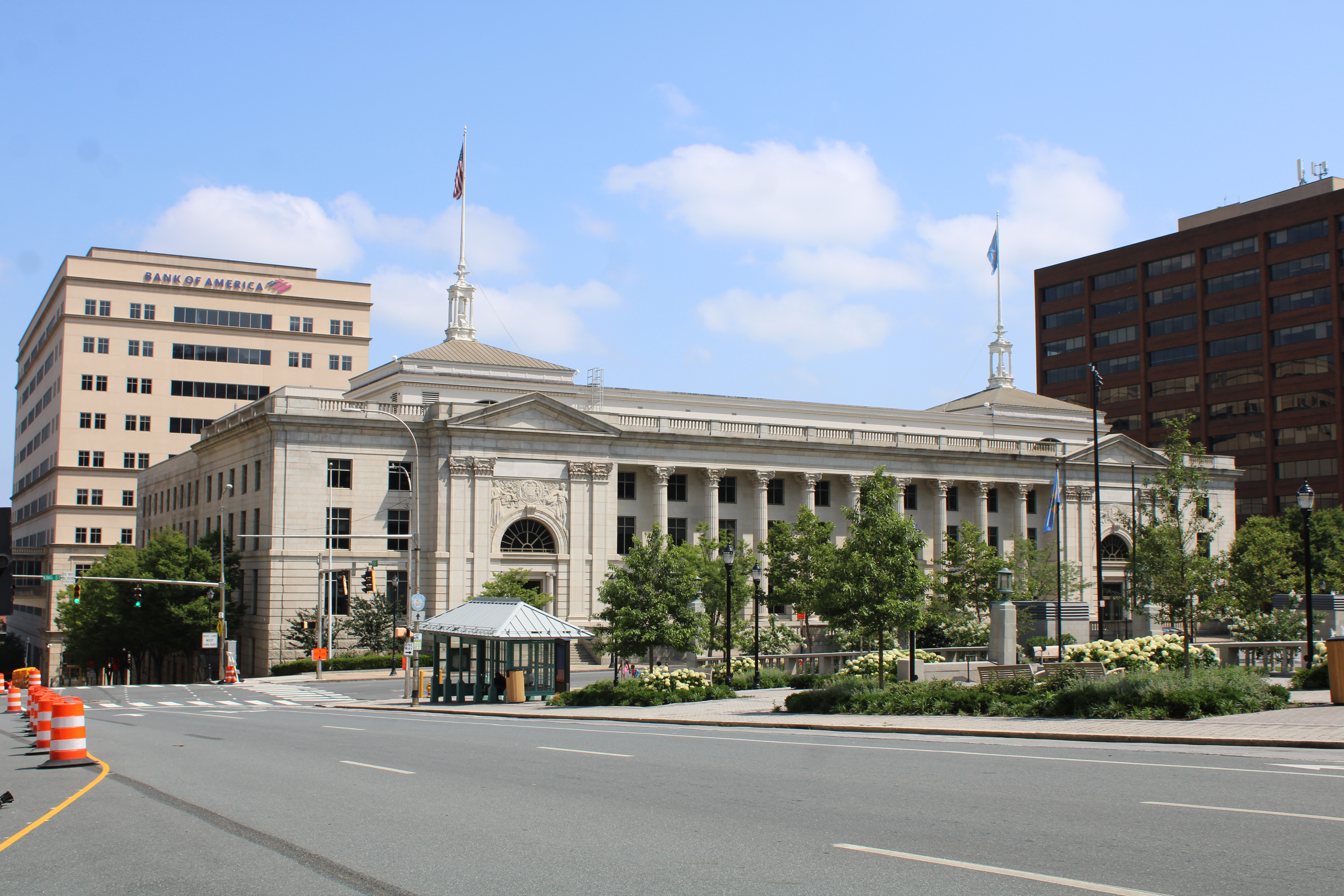
Public Building

The eight blocks surrounding the square contain a number of downtown buildings:

Name	Built	Architect	Style	Current Use
I. M. Pei Building	1971	I.M. Pei	Brutalist	Multi-tenant office
MBNA Bracebridge I	1995			BofA credit card headquarters
Delaware Trust Building	1930	Dennison & Hirons	Classical Revival	Condos and restaurants, listed on the National Register of Historic Places in 2003.
DuPont Building	1908			DuPont headquarters
First & Central Church				Presbyterian Church USA
Public Building	1916	Henry Hornbostel	Classical Revival	Law firm
Wilmington Mansion	1860s			Wilmington Club, listed on the National Register of Historic Places in 2006.
Wilmington Post Office	1937	Associated Federal Architects	Classical Revival	Wilmington Trust headquarters, listed on the National Register of Historic Places in 1979.
Wilmington Public Library	1922	Edward Lippincott Tilton	Beaux-Arts	Library

== Corporate headquarters ==
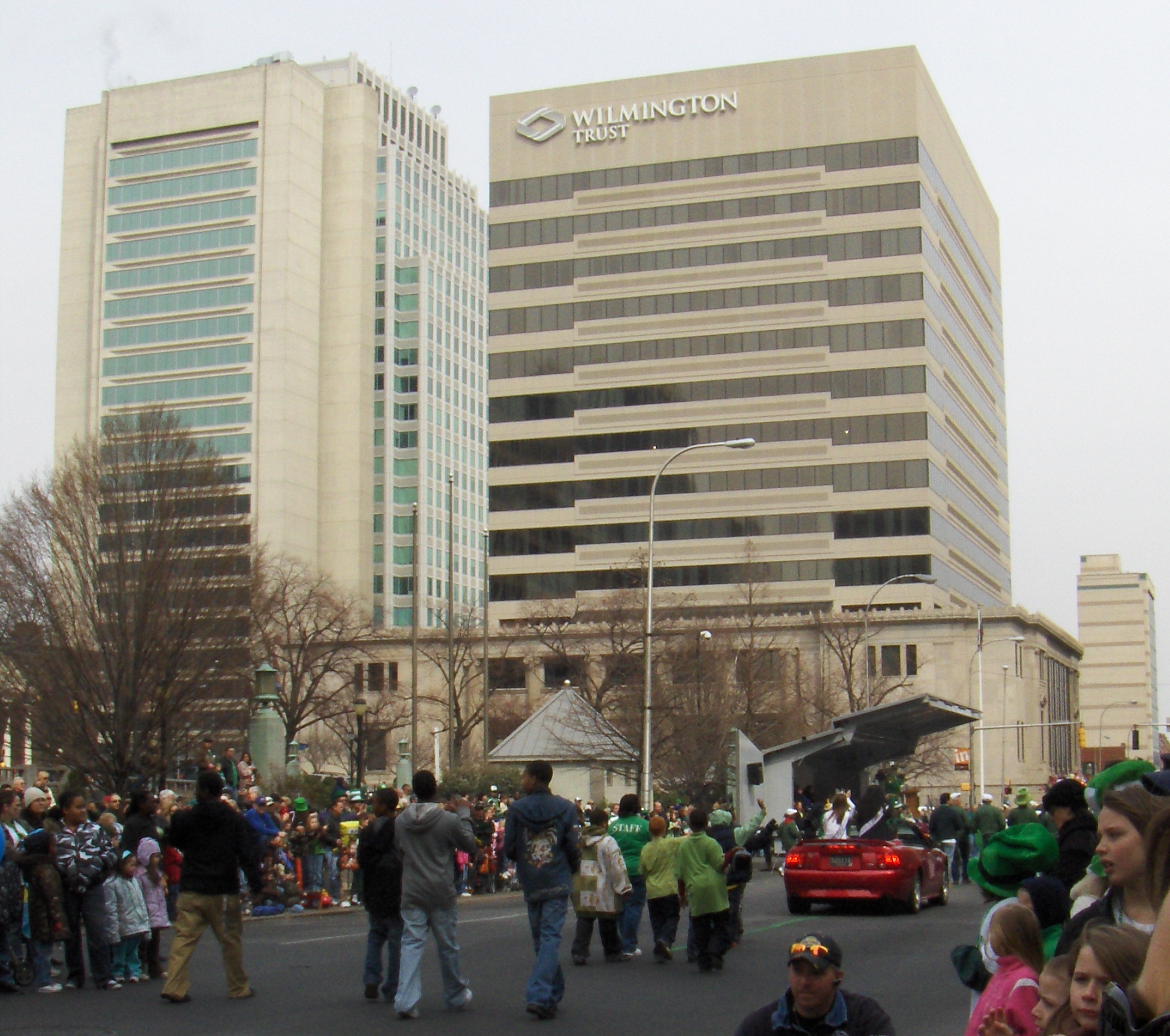
Wilmington Trust headquarters with the I. M. Pei Building to the left

=== Current ===
- Chemours
- Wilmington Trust
- Bank of America Credit Card Division

=== Former ===
- American Viscose Company
- Atlas Powder Company
- Barnsdall Oil
- Delaware Trust
- DuPont
- Hercules Inc.
- MBNA

== Transportation ==
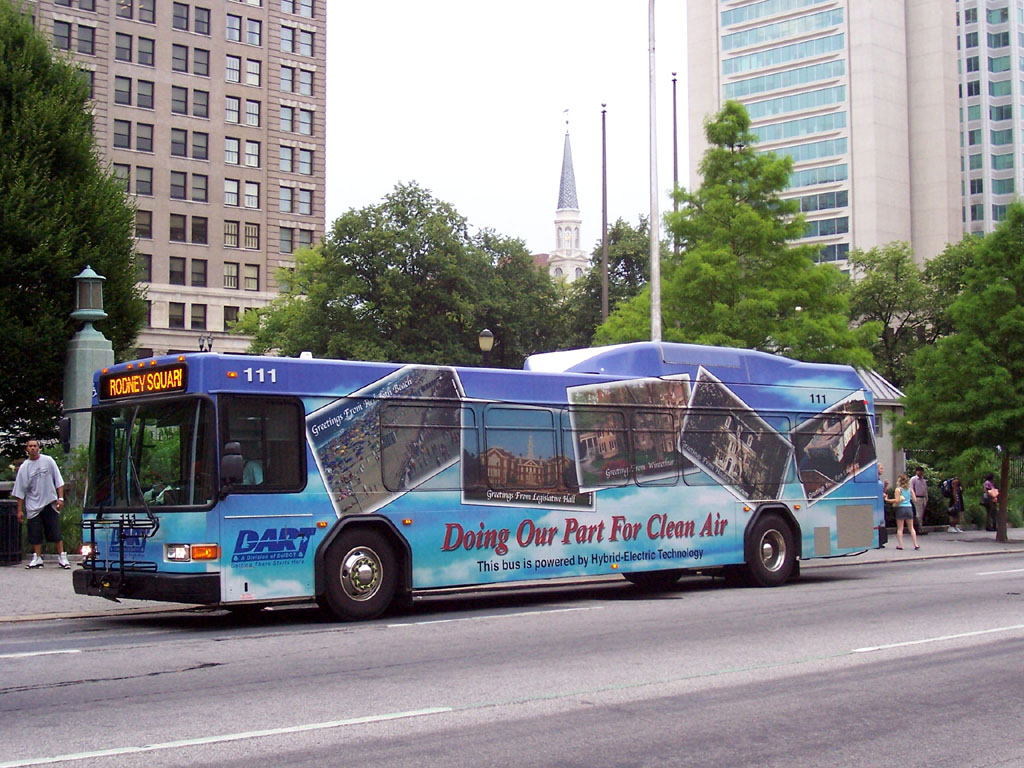
DART hybrid bus in Rodney Square

Rodney Square serves as a bus stop for several DART First State bus routes including 2, 4, 6, 9, 10, 11, 13, 14, 18, 20, 25, and 301. From 1992 to December 2017, Rodney Square served as the main hub for DART First State buses in Wilmington. In December 2017, the state of Delaware under the direction of Governor John Carney eliminated the bus hub at Rodney Square by scattering stops throughout downtown Wilmington, removing 13 routes from stopping at the square. The decision to eliminate the hub was made in order to reduce congestion and overcrowding at Rodney Square. This action resulted in many riders having to walk multiple blocks to make transfers, and many of the new bus stops do not have shelters or benches. The Wilmington Transit Center was built as a new hub for DART First State buses adjacent to the Wilmington Train Station, opening in May 2020.

== See also ==
- National Register of Historic Places listings in Wilmington, Delaware
