= 2016 Wilmington mayoral election =

- November 8, 2016
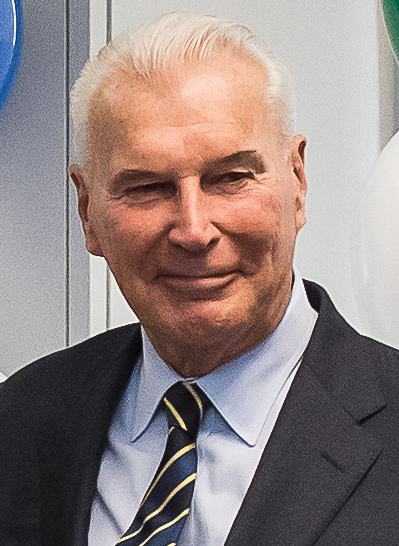

| Nominee | Mike Purzycki | Robert Martin | Steven Washington |
| Party | Democratic | Republican | Independent Party |
| Popular vote | 22,409 | 2,956 | 1,905 |
| Percentage | 82.17% | 10.83% | 7.00% |
- Precinct results Purzycki: 70–80% 80–90% >90% No votes
Mayor before election
Dennis P. Williams
Democratic
Elected mayor
Mike Purzycki
Democratic

The 2016 Wilmington mayoral election was held on Tuesday, November 8, 2016, to elect the mayor of Wilmington, Delaware. Incumbent mayor Dennis P. Williams ran for reelection to a second term, but was defeated in the Democratic primary on September 13, 2016, by Mike Purzycki, the former executive director of the Riverfront Development Corporation. Purzycki defeated Republican Robert Martin and Delaware Independent Steven Washington in the general election.

== Democratic primary ==
=== Candidates ===
- Maria Cabrera
- Theo Gregory
- Norm Griffiths
- Kevin Kelley, City Councilman
- Bob Marshall
- Mike Purzycki, former executive director of the Riverfront Development Corporation
- Dennis P. Williams, incumbent mayor
- Eugene Young, advocacy director for the Delaware Center for Justice

=== Results ===
Democratic primary results
| Party | Candidate | Votes | % |
|---|---|---|---|
| Democratic | Mike Purzycki | 2,968 | 23.59 |
| Democratic | Eugene Young | 2,734 | 21.78 |
| Democratic | Kevin Kelley | 2,553 | 20.29 |
| Democratic | Dennis P. Williams (incumbent) | 1,758 | 13.97 |
| Democratic | Theo Gregory | 1,318 | 10.47 |
| Democratic | Norm Griffiths | 632 | 5.02 |
| Democratic | Maria Cabrera | 392 | 3.11 |
| Democratic | Bob Marshall | 223 | 1.77 |
| Total votes | | 12,578 | 100 |

== General election ==
=== Candidates ===
- Robert Martin (R), real estate professional
- Gerald Patterson (L), minister and entrepreneur (died August 31, 2016, and removed from ballot)
- Mike Purzycki (D), former executive director of the Riverfront Development Corporation
- Steven Washington (IPoD), teacher

=== Results ===
Wilmington mayoral election, 2016
| Party | Candidate | Votes | % |
|---|---|---|---|
| Democratic | Mike Purzycki | 22,409 | 82.17 |
| Republican | Robert Martin | 2,956 | 10.83 |
| Independent Party | Steven Washington | 1,905 | 7.00 |
| Total votes | | 27,272 | 100 |
| Democratic hold | | | |
