= James H. Sills Jr. =

American politician

53rd Mayor of Wilmington
- In office 1993–2001
- Preceded by: Daniel Frawley
- Succeeded by: James M. Baker

Member of the Delaware House of Representatives from the 3rd district
- In office 1984–1992

Personal details
- Born: 1931 (age 94–95) North Carolina

James H. Sills Jr. (born 1931) is an American politician who served as the first African-American mayor of Wilmington, Delaware. He previously served in the Delaware House of Representatives from 1984 to 1992.

== Biography ==
Sills was born in North Carolina in 1931. In 1959, he moved to Wilmington with his wife where he worked for the Family Court of Delaware and served as president of the Wilmington NAACP. From 1972 until 1997, he taught at the University of Delaware. He was founding director of the Urban Agent Program and in 1987, he founded the Delaware Community Reinvestment Action Council. In 1978, he successfully supervised the school desegregation of Wilmington schools. In the 1970s, he was elected to the New Castle County School Board and later served as its president. He served on the Wilmington City Council. From 1984 until 1992, he was served as the representative for the Third District in the Delaware House of Representatives. In 1992, he defeated two-term mayor Daniel Frawley in the Wilmington mayoral primary and then went on to defeat activist Beatrice Patton Carroll in the November general election. He was the first African-American to serve as mayor of Wilmington. He was reelected in 1996 with 61% of the vote. In 2000, he was defeated by James M. Baker.

His son, James Sills III L, currently serves as President and CEO of Mechanics and Farmers Bank in Durham, North Carolina.

== Personal life ==
He is married to Evelyn Prescott Sills; they have three children, James H. Sills III, Mark Sills, and Julie Sills.
