= Brandywine Building =

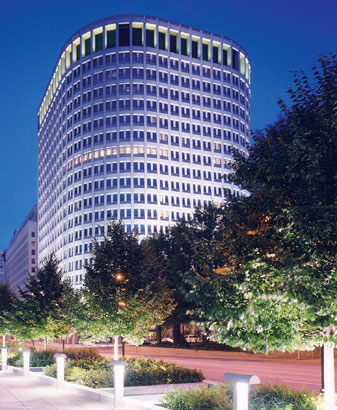
- Viewed from W 11th Street.
- Interactive map of the Brandywine Building area

General information
- Status: Completed
- Type: Office
- Location: 1000 N West St; Wilmington, Delaware
- Coordinates: 39.735456°N 75.554311°W
- Completed: 1970

Height
- Roof: 79 m (259 ft)

Technical details
- Floor count: 19

References
- emporis.com

The Brandywine Building is a 19-story, 260 foot high rise building in downtown Wilmington, Delaware. It contains primarily office and commercial space. The building was originally built in 1970 as an expansion for DuPont's Headquarters, but is now mostly used by Citi.

== History ==
- 1968 - The Brandywine Building begins construction.
- 1970 - The Brandywine Building finishes construction and was primarily used by DuPont as an expansion for their downtown headquarters.
- 2005 - DuPont moves out of the Brandywine Building as they began to downsize.
- 2006 - Citi moves into the Brandywine Building.
- 2017 - The Brandywine Building is only 47% occupied by Citi, and is having a hard time attracting tenants.

== See also ==
- List of tallest buildings in Wilmington, Delaware
- DuPont
- Citi
