= I. M. Pei Building =

High-rise office building in Wilmington, Delaware

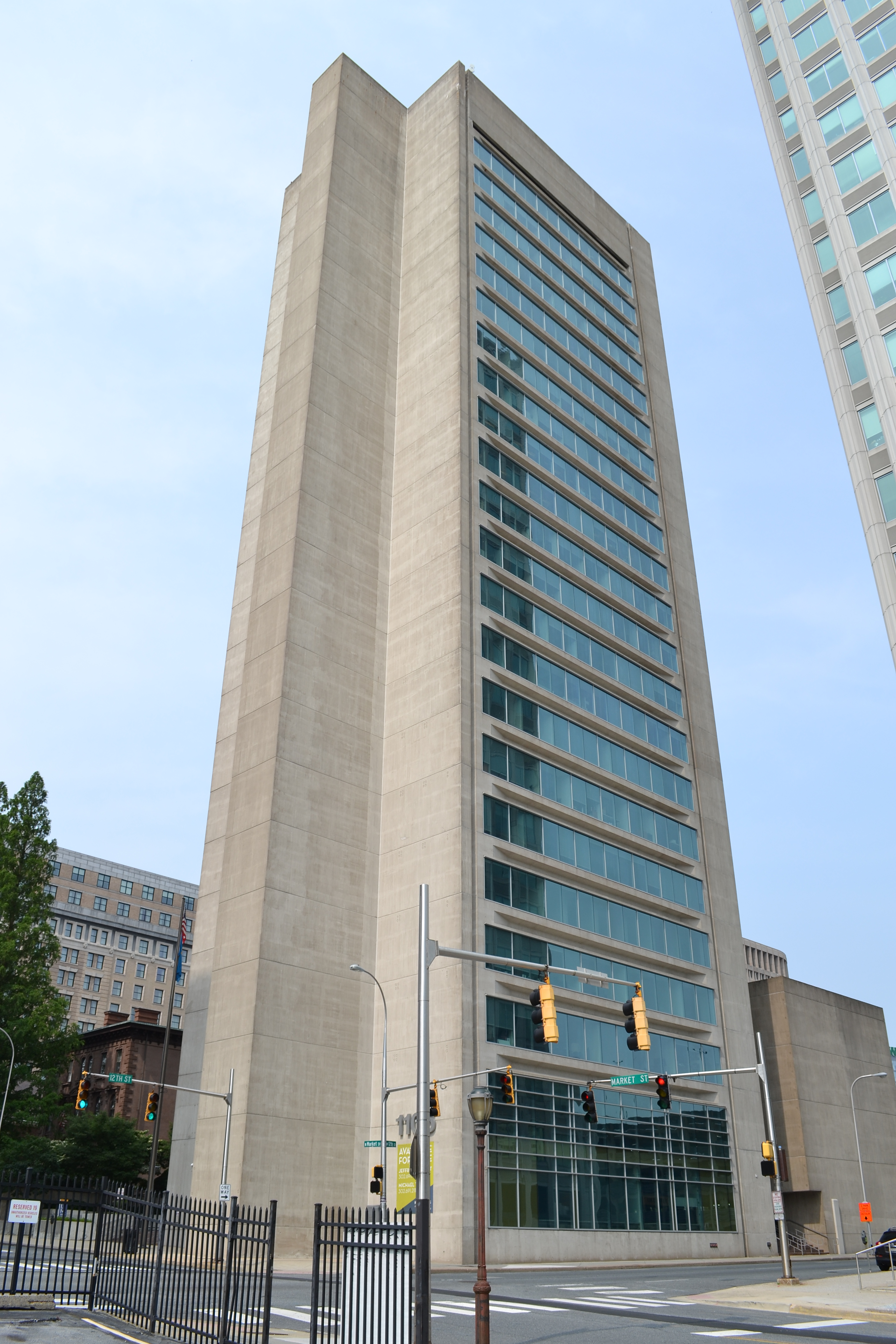
- The I. M. Pei Building in 2019
- Former names: American Life Insurance Building; Wilmington Tower

General information
- Status: Completed
- Type: Office
- Location: 1105 North Market Street; Wilmington, Delaware
- Coordinates: 39.7473°N 75.5471°W
- Completed: 1971
- Owner: I.M Pei Building. L.L.C.
- Operator: Buccini Pollin

Height
- Roof: 86 m (282 ft)

Technical details
- Floor count: 23

Design and construction
- Architect: I. M. Pei & Partners

Website
- Official website

The I. M. Pei Building, also known as the Wilmington Tower and 1105 North Market Street, is a high-rise office building in Wilmington, Delaware. It is the third tallest building in Delaware, and the only building in the state designed by noted architect I. M. Pei. The building was completed in 1971 and is 282 feet (86 m) tall, with 23 floors.

== History ==
The building was announced in 1964 by the American Life Insurance Company (ALICO). Pei's slender design was greeted with enthusiasm in the local press, with one columnist writing "... we will be as proud of the American Life Insurance Building... as we are of Old Swedes Church and the other charming colonial structures in these parts." Construction began in 1966 and was originally scheduled to be completed in 1968, but the project took much longer than anticipated due to labor shortages, weather, and Pei's exacting standards. It was finally finished in 1971 and was reported to have greatly overrun its $6.5 million budget, though the final cost was unknown.

The Wilmington Tower, as it was officially named in 1970, ran into financial difficulties almost immediately. Several other office buildings had been completed during its six-year construction period, and the premium office rental rates were not competitive. By 1972, a year after its completion, the building had only two tenants. It remained over half empty in the 1980s, with occupants reporting a variety of problems including faulty elevators, ineffective climate control, and leaks. In 2004, the owners announced a $6 million renovation that would address many of the functional issues but also included substantial alterations to the building's appearance. After criticism from architects and preservationists, most of the controversial changes were abandoned. The renovations were finished in December and helped boost occupancy almost immediately.

== Architecture ==
The I. M. Pei Building was constructed from cast in place concrete, with 20 office floors and two mechanical levels above a double-height ground floor. Each office floor is 66 feet (20 m) wide and 75 feet (23 m) long, with 4,440 square feet (412 m^{2}) of usable space (small for a modern office building). In order to have a completely open floor plan, Pei grouped the building services, elevators, and stairwells in two exterior cores and used post-tensioned beams to support the weight of the floors. Unusually, the beams are oriented parallel to the longer side of the building, which was more challenging structurally but allowed the entirety of the interior and exterior to be free of columns. Prior to the installation of interior partitions, it was possible to see all the way through the narrow building.

Stylistically, the building continues the Brutalist ideas of other buildings Pei designed around the same time, like the Green Building and Society Hill Towers. Pei gave the building a slender profile on the Market Street side to keep it from overwhelming the neighboring buildings, which include the historic Wilmington Club. The north and south sides have full-width windows separated by concrete beams with recessed channels; a very similar design was later used by Pei's partner Henry N. Cobb on the five-sided Baltimore World Trade Center. The east and west sides are windowless and punctuated by the supporting cores.

== See also ==
- List of tallest buildings in Wilmington, Delaware
- Wilmington, Delaware
- List of tallest buildings by U.S. state
