= Mick Purzycki =

American internet entrepreneur

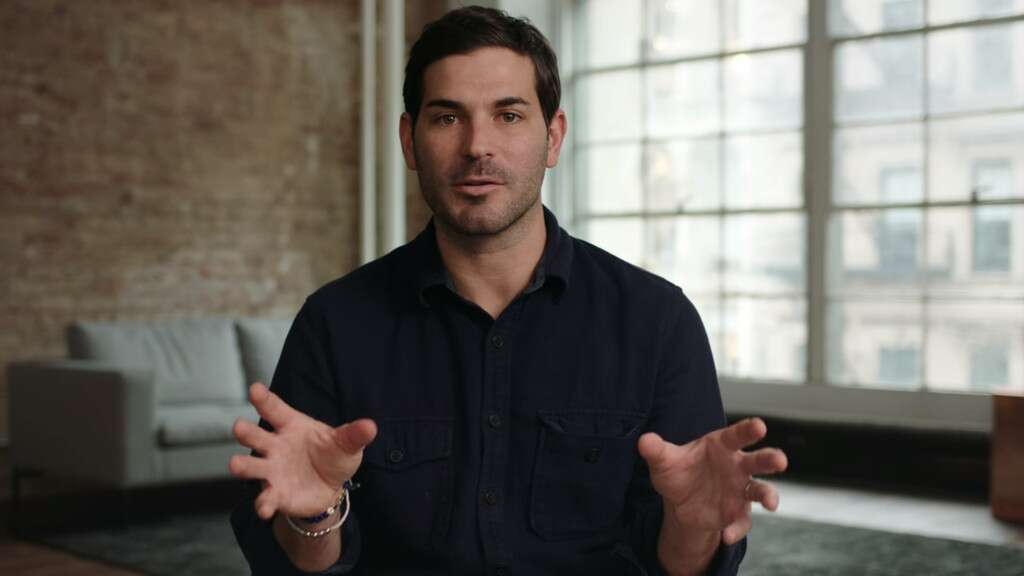
- An image of Mick Purzycki featured in the film Fyre: The Greatest Party That Never Happened
- Born: Michael S. Purzycki; March 5, 1987 (age 39); Wilmington, Delaware, U.S.
- Education: University of Delaware
- Known for: Entrepreneur, Film producer
- Spouse: Ally Wu
- Relatives: Mike Purzycki (father)

Mick Purzycki is an American internet entrepreneur and the CEO of Jerry Media. He is the co-creator and Emmy nominated producer of the 2019 Netflix documentary Fyre, in which he also appears. He is the founder and lead strategist for Meme 2020, an issue based political marketing company that launched the first influencer marketing campaign in presidential political history when collaborating with the Michael Bloomberg 2020 presidential campaign. Purzycki is also the founder of Jerry News, Civil Jewelry, Meme Media and Biff's Crush.

== Biography ==
Purzycki was born Michael Purzycki Jr. in Wilmington, Delaware. His father, Mike Purzycki, was elected as mayor of Wilmington in 2016. After graduating from the Tatnall School in Greenville, he attended the University of Delaware, where he played for the football team as a wide receiver. He later moved to China, where he worked for Groupon for three years before returning to the United States in 2012. After moving to New York, he helped to develop a fitness app called Fitmoo, which he worked on for two years before leaving the project. He began working for Jerry Media after he and James Ohliger, both of whom were then working on the social media project Krispy Shorts, contacted Jerry Media founder Elliot Tebele. He married his wife, Ally, in 2015.
