= River Tower at Christina Landing =

River Tower At Christina Landing
- Viewed across the Christina River in 2015
- Former names: River Tower At Christina Landing, 105 Christina Landing Dr, Residents At Christina Landing 2

General information
- Status: Completed
- Type: Residential
- Location: 105 Christina Landing Drive; Wilmington, Delaware
- Coordinates: 39.735456°N 75.554311°W
- Completed: 2007
- Owner: River Tower at Christina Landing Condominium Association
- Operator: River Tower at Christina Landing Condominium Association

Height
- Roof: 89.916 m (295.00 ft)

Technical details
- Floor count: 25
- Lifts/elevators: 3

Design and construction
- Architect: Stantec Architecture, Inc.
- Main contractor: Stantec Architecture, Inc. Healy Long & Jevin

The River Tower at Christina Landing is a high rise located in Wilmington, Delaware. It is the tallest residential building in both the city of Wilmington and the state of Delaware, rising 25 stories with a 13th floor, and 295 ft (90m.). The Building was constructed in 2005, and opened in 2007. The tower was designed by Stantec Architecture, Inc.

This skyscraper's main purpose is as a residential building. It contains a pool, Jacuzzi, and a sitting area on the roof. There is also space reserved for parties.

The skyscraper also has eight stories of parking garage for residents who live there.

== See also ==
- List of tallest buildings in Wilmington, Delaware
- Wilmington, Delaware
