= List of mayors of Wilmington, Delaware =

The mayor of Wilmington is the chief executive of the government of Wilmington, Delaware, as stipulated by the charter. The current mayor of Wilmington is John Carney.

== City of Wilmington ==
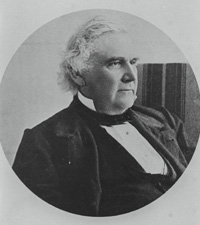
First mayor Richard H. Bayard

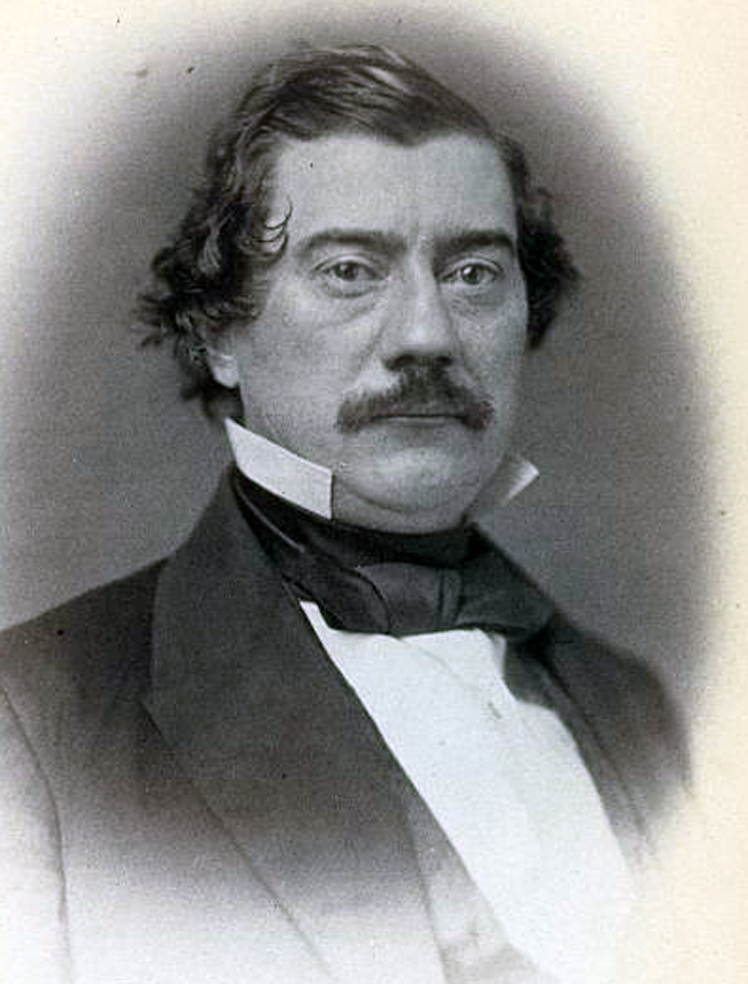
20th mayor William G. Whiteley

Mayors of Wilmington, Delaware
Rank	Image	Mayor	Start	End	Party	Note
1		Richard Bayard	1832	1834	Whig	Wilmington incorporated in 1832.
2		Nicholas Williamson	1834	1843	Whig	
3		David C. Wilson	1843	1845	Whig	
4		Alexander Porter	1845	1848	Whig	
5		William Huffington	1848	1850	Democratic	
6		Joshua Driver	1850	1851		
7		Columbus Evans	1851	1852	Whig	Editor of the Delaware Republican.
8		William Hemphill Jones	1852	1853		First mayor elected by popular vote.
9		John Alderdice	1853	1854		Publisher of The Journal.
10		Heyward, James F.	1854	1855		
11		William Wiggins	1855	1856		
12		William Huffington	1856	1857	Democratic	Non-continuous terms.
13		George Sparks	1857	1858		
14		Thomas Young	1858	1860		
15		Vincent Glipin	1860	1863		
16		John Turner	1863	1865		
17		Joshua Maris	1865	1867		
18		Joshua Valentine	1867	1872		
19		Joshua Simms	1872	1875	Democratic	
20		William G. Whiteley	1875	1878	Democratic	
21		John Allmond	1878	1882		
22		John Wales	1882	1885		Son of Senator John Wales.
23		Calvin Rhoads	1885	1891	Democratic	Choir director
		Sandsbury Wiley	1891	1893	Republican	Term changed to two years, Saturday election in June.
		E. G. Shortridge	1893	1894	Republican	
		Charles Jefferies	1895	?	Democratic	
		John Fahey	1899	?	Democratic	
		George Fisher	1903	1903		
		Charles Bird	1903	?	Democratic	
		Horace Wilson	1905	1907	Republican	
		Harrison Howell	1911	1915	Republican	
		John Lawson	1919	?		
		LeRoy Harvey	1921	1923?		Founded Wilmington Music School.
		William Taylor	?	1925	Republican	Lost at Sea
		George Forrest	1923	1931		First intern at Delaware Hospital.
		Frank Sparks	1931	1933	Republican	
		William Speer	1933	1935	Democratic	
		Walter Bacon	1935	1940	Republican	Resigned when elected governor.
		Albert James	1941	1944	Republican	Filled term of Gov. Bacon.
		Thomas Herlihy	1945	1946	Republican	Resigned when appointed Chief Judge of Municipal Court.
		Joseph Wilson	1947	1949	Republican	
		James Hearn	1949	1953	Republican	
		August Walz	1954	1955	Republican	
47		Eugene Lammot	1957	1960	Democratic	Resigned when elected Lt. Gov. Election Tues. in Nov.
48		John Babiarz	1961	1969	Democratic	1968 Occupation
49		Harry Haskell	1969	1973	Republican	
50		Thomas Maloney	1973	1977	Democratic	
51		William McLaughlin	1977	1984	Democratic	
52		Daniel Frawley	1985	1993	Democratic	Stadium named after.
53		James Sills	1993	2001	Democratic	First African American Mayor
54		James Baker	2001	2013	Democratic	First 3-Term Mayor with 4-year terms
55		Dennis Williams	2013	2017	Democratic	Served in the Delaware House of Representatives
56		Mike Purzycki	2017	2025	Democratic	Spearheaded successful Riverfront redevelopment
57		John Carney	2025	Incumbent	Democratic	First Mayor to previously serve as State Governor

== Borough of Wilmington ==
Chief Burgesses of Wilmington, Delaware
Rank	Chief Burgess	Year	Note
1	Shipley, William	1739	William Penn granted charter on November 16, 1739.
2	Way, Joseph	1742	
3	Shipley, William	1743	2nd non-consecutive term.
4	Hannum, Robert	1744	
5	Peters, Joseph	1745	
6	Stapler, John	1748	Stapler Park named after
7	Few, James	1750	
8	Littler, Joshua	1751	
9	Stapler, John	1752	2nd non-consecutive term.
10	Littler, Joshua	1753	2nd non-consecutive term.
11	Littler, Joshua	1754	3rd term.
12	Dawes, Edward	1755	
13	Stapler, John	1756	3rd non-consecutive term.
14	Gilpin, Thomas	1757	
15	Stapler, John	1758	4th non-consecutive term.
16	McKinly, John	1759	
17	Dawes, Edward	1762	
18	Lea, John	1764	Lea Blvd. named after.
19	Way, Joseph	1765	
20	McKinly, John	1767	
21	Bennet, Joseph	1770	Bennet Street named after.
22	McKinly, John	1771	
23	Robinson, Nicholas	1774	
24	McKinly, John	1775	
25	Bennett, Joseph	1777	
26	Stidham, Joseph	1778	
27	Broom, Jacob	1783	Broom Street named after.
28	Kean, Thomas	1784	
29	Broom, Jacob	1785	
30	Gibbson, James	1786	
31	Way, Thomas	1788	
32	Shallcross, Joseph	1790	Shallcross Avenue named after.
33	Bush, David	1792	
34	Broom, Jacob	1794	
35	Brynberg, Peter	1796	
36	Warner, Joseph	1798	
37	Tilton, Hehemiah	1799	
38	Brobson, James	1801	
39	Hendrickson, Isaac	1802	
40	Brobson, James	1803	
41	Lea, James	1806	
42	Dixon, Isaac	1807	
43	Brobson, James	1808	

== See also ==
- Timeline of Wilmington, Delaware
- List of governors of Delaware
- List of lieutenant governors of Delaware
- List of United States senators from Delaware
- List of United States representatives from Delaware
