= Dennis P. Williams =

American politician (born 1953)

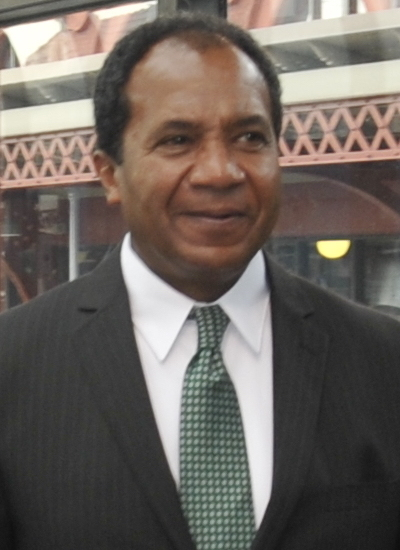

55th Mayor of Wilmington
- In office January 8, 2013 – January 3, 2017
- Preceded by: James M. Baker
- Succeeded by: Mike Purzycki

Member of the Delaware House of Representatives from the 1st district
- In office 1995–2013
- Preceded by: Orlando J. George Jr.
- Succeeded by: Charles Potter Jr.

Personal details
- Born: January 8, 1953 (age 73) Wilmington, Delaware, U.S.
- Party: Democratic
- Spouse: Shayne
- Education: Delaware Technical Community College
- Profession: Police Officer

Dennis P. Williams (born January 8, 1953) is an American politician who served as the Mayor of Wilmington, Delaware, from 2013 to 2017. He previously served in the Delaware House of Representatives from 1995 to 2013 in a district based in northern Wilmington. He won the mayoral election for the city of Wilmington on November 6, 2012. Williams ran for a second term as mayor in 2016, but lost in the primary to Mike Purzycki, who succeeded him as mayor.

== Early life and career ==
Born in Wilmington, Williams attended P.S. duPont High School, graduated in criminal justice from Delaware Technical Community College, and was a student at Wilmington Police Academy. He then worked homicide at the city's police department.

== Political career ==
In the 1994 state elections, Orlando George, Jr. was re-elected in the 1st district, but he resigned his post the following year to become president of Delaware Technical Community College. A special election was held on August 12 to fill the vacancy, in which Williams defeated Republican Karen Miller 1757 to 897, later securing a much larger majority when he won re-election for his first full term that November. Thereafter, Williams was unopposed in every general election until 2008, when he crushed Republican James McClain Jr. 91% to 9%, and was unopposed again in 2010.

By the end of the 2012 legislative season, Williams was chair of the joint finance committee, and the appropriations committee, whilst also serving as a member on the judiciary, corrections, public safety, and homeland security committees.

=== 2012 mayoral election ===
As the end of his legislative term approached, Williams announced he would run in the Democratic primary for the 2012 Wilmington mayoral election to replace term-limited mayor James M. Baker, forgoing a further attempt for re-election to the state house. Williams ran on a platform centered around tackling crime and emphasizing his law enforcement experience. He was endorsed by the Delaware State Lodge of the Fraternal Order of Police, and Wilmington Fire Fighters Association Local 1590, but failed to secure the endorsement of the Fraternal Order of Police Lodge #1, his home Lodge. His campaign ran into some controversy after it emerged he owed $3,184.77 in taxes and bills to the city, following on from a similar incident in March. He later caught up with these debts, blaming them on financial pressure wrought by paying for his mother's medical bills.

Williams defeated five other candidates in the September 11 primary, and went on to win the general election unopposed.

=== 2016 mayoral election ===
Williams ran for a second term as mayor in 2016. In the September 13 primary, he lost the Democratic nomination to Mike Purzycki, the former executive director of the Riverfront Development Corporation, and placed fourth in the field of eight candidates behind Purzycki, Eugene Young, and Kevin Kelley. Purzycki went on to win the general election on November 8, 2016, and Williams left office on January 3, 2017, when Purzycki was sworn in as mayor. After leaving office, Williams was one of the people who defended Joe Biden's tale of a conflict with teenage gang leader Corn Pop when Biden was a lifeguard at a public pool in 1962. Williams stated that Corn Pop (whose real name was William Morris) was as "real as the moon in the sky."

Political offices
Preceded by James M. Baker	Mayor of Wilmington, Delaware; 2013–2017	Succeeded by Mike Purzycki
