= DuPont Building =

High-rise building in Wilmington, Delaware

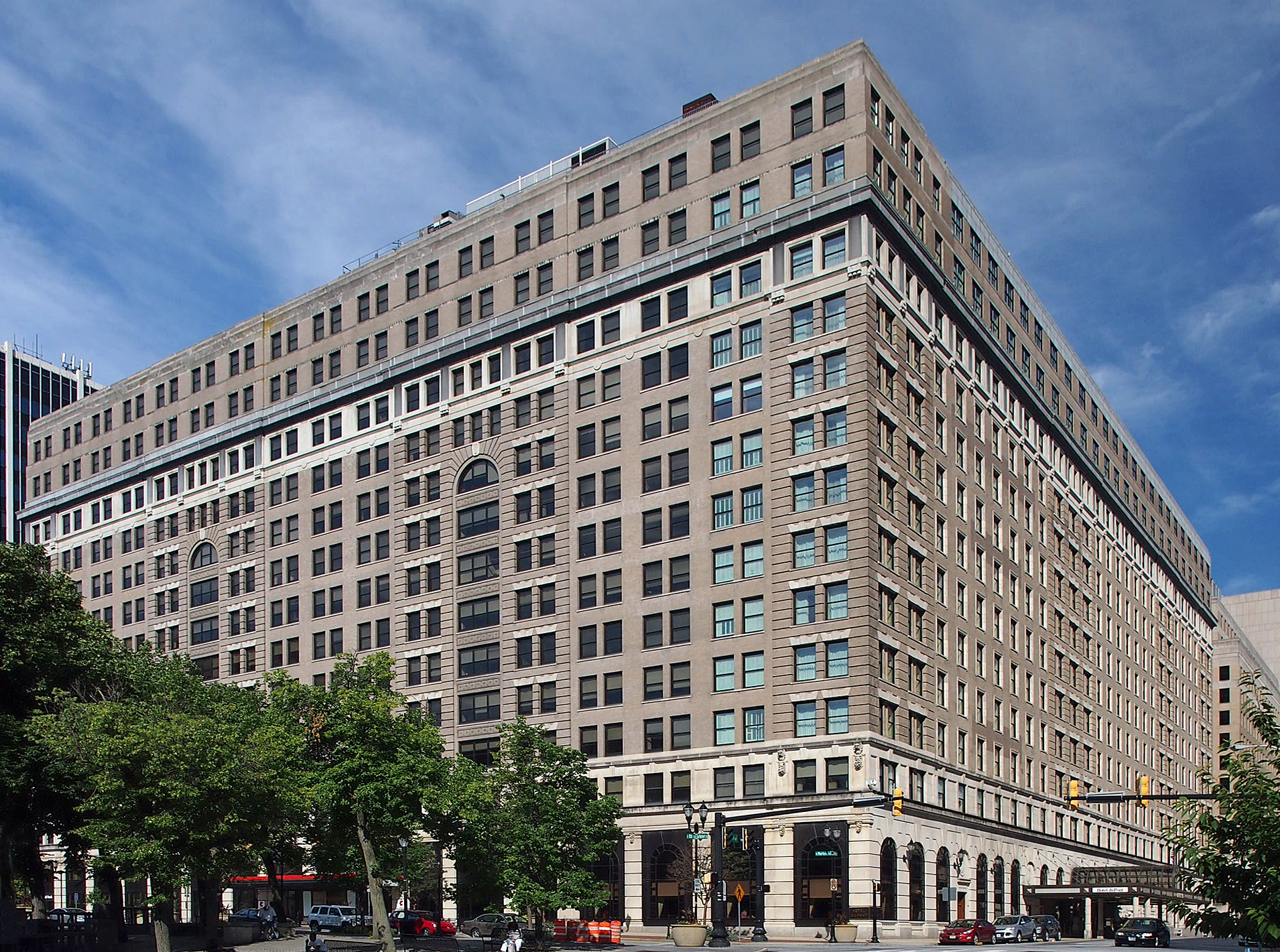
- The DuPont Building viewed from the north-east
- Interactive map of the DuPont Building area

General information
- Location: 1007 N. Market Street, Wilmington, Delaware, United States
- Coordinates: 39°44′46″N 75°32′52″W
- Construction started: 1907
- Completed: 1923; 103 years ago
- Owner: The Buccini/Pollin Group

Height
- Top floor: 124 feet (38 m)

Technical details
- Floor count: 13

References
- DuPont Building
- U.S. Historic district – Contributing property
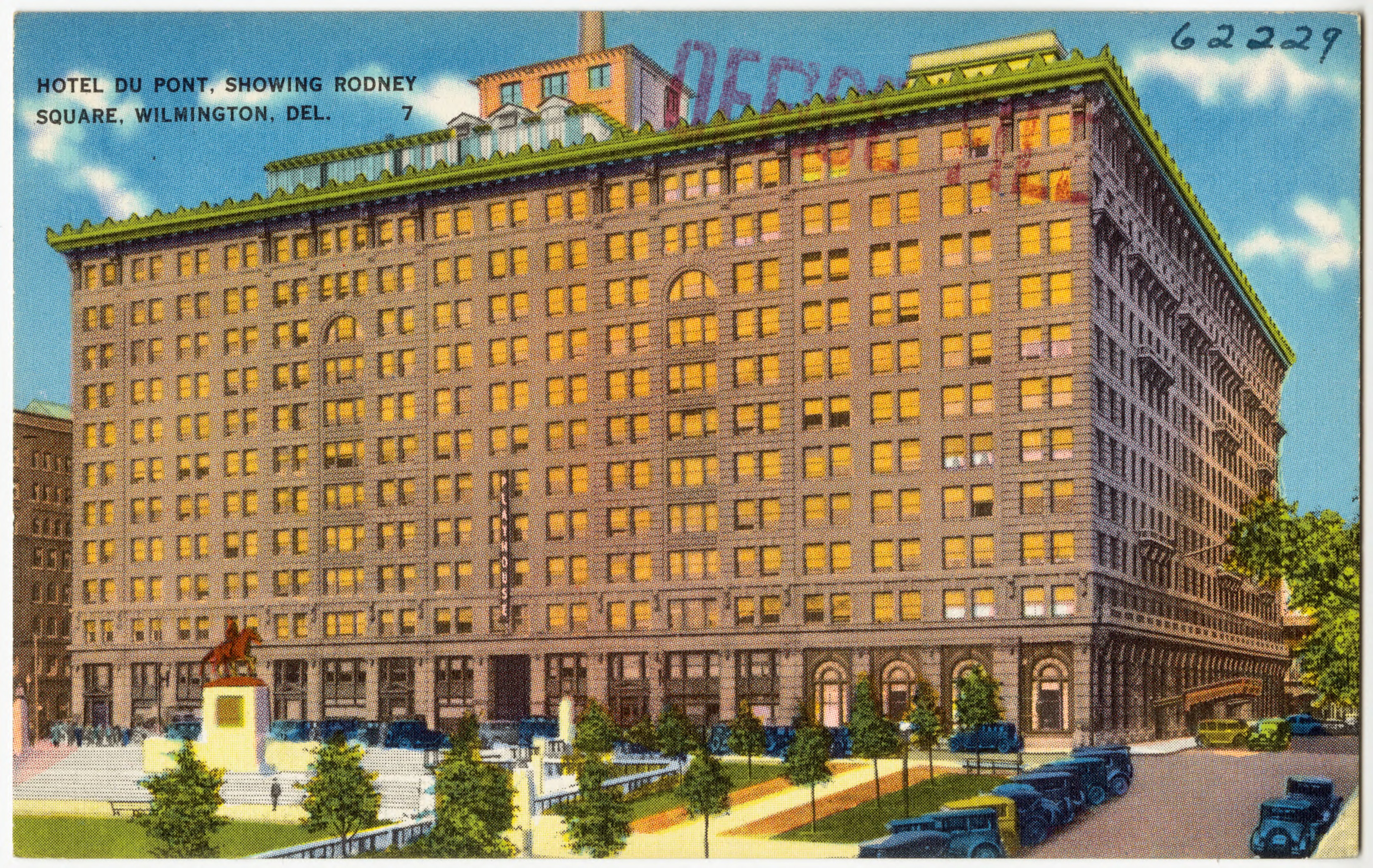
- Postcard showing building behind Rodney Square

- Location within Delaware Location within the United States
- Architectural style: Italian Renaissance Revival
- Part of: Rodney Square Historic District (ID11000522)
- Designated CP: August 10, 2011

The DuPont Building, occupying the entire block bound by 10th, 11th, Orange, and Market streets, was one of the first high-rises in Wilmington, Delaware, United States. It looks out over Rodney Square. The building was built in phases, with the original building constructed in 1908 fronting Rodney Square. At the time, the building housed the offices of DuPont. In 1913, the building was expanded into a "U" by adding wings along 10th and 11th streets, the DuPont Playhouse was added, and a portion of the original 1908 section was converted into the Hotel du Pont. (Hotel du Pont is a member of Historic Hotels of America, the official program of the National Trust for Historic Preservation.) The final addition to the building occurred in 1923 when the Orange Street addition was added along with an additional two floors, bringing the floor count to 13 and the height to 124 feet (38 m).

Until early 2015, the building housed DuPont's headquarters. In December 2014, DuPont announced that it would move and consolidate its corporate headquarters at its nearby Chestnut Run Plaza site and that The Chemours Company, which spun off from DuPont in 2015, would move into the DuPont Building. As well as Chemours, the building houses The Playhouse on Rodney Square (formerly the DuPont Playhouse), the Hotel duPont, and a branch of M&T Bank.

Under pressure from activist shareholders, the company first leased the building's DuPont Playhouse in January 2015 to the Grand Opera House, which renamed it The Playhouse on Rodney Square. The entire structure and the hotel business were then sold to Wilmington-based developer Buccini/Pollin in January 2018. The new owners have leased the building's office space back to Chemours, will continue to lease The Playhouse to The Grand Opera House, and have promised to keep the hotel operating.

Hotel du Pont was where Joe Biden announced his candidacy for the 1972 United States Senate election in Delaware.

== Gallery ==
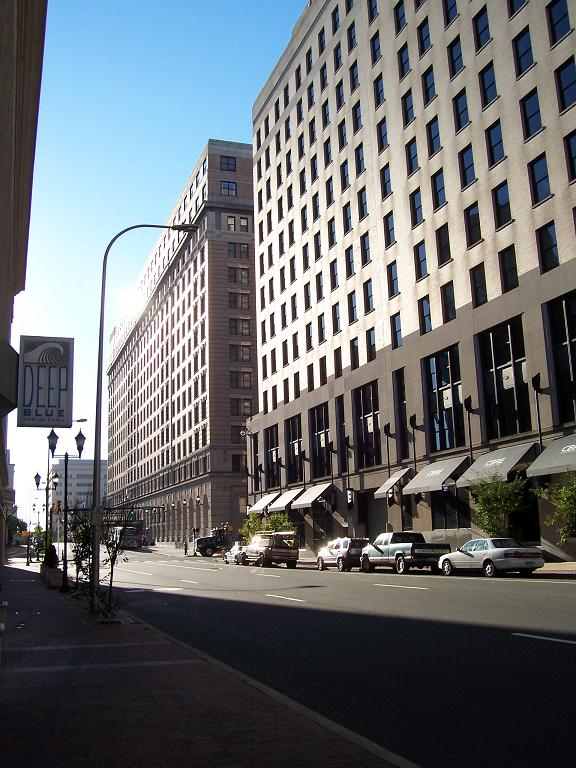
The DuPont Building (center left) and the Nemours Building (right) in 2006.

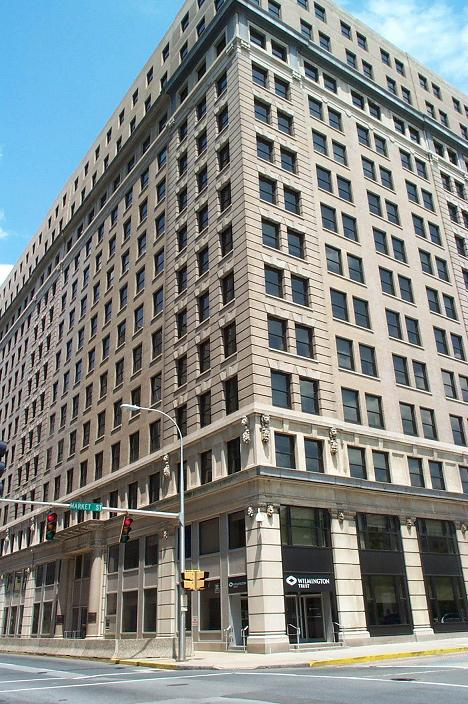
The corner of Market and 10th with the Wilmington Trust branch.

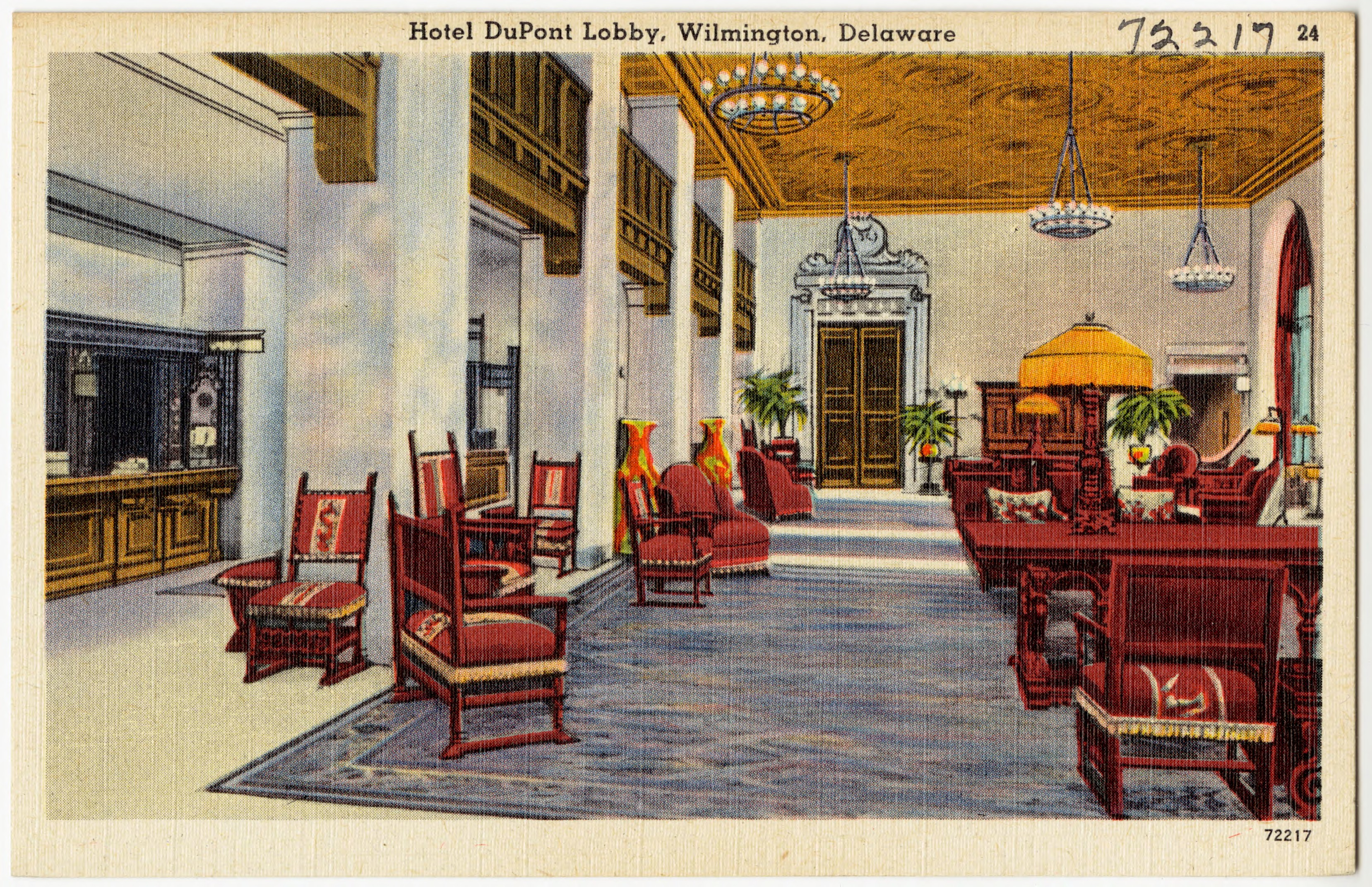
Postcard of the lobby, circa 1930-1945

== See also ==
- List of Historic Hotels of America
