= Bank of the Manhattan Company Building =

Bank of the Manhattan Company Building may refer to any of the following buildings in New York City which are or have been owned by the Bank of Manhattan Company (now Chase):

- 40 Wall Street, Manhattan
- Chase Manhattan Bank Building, 29-27 41st Avenue, Queens, also known as the Queens Clock Tower
- 28 Liberty Street, Manhattan, formerly known as One Chase Manhattan Plaza
