= Delaware Trust Building =

- U.S. National Register of Historic Places
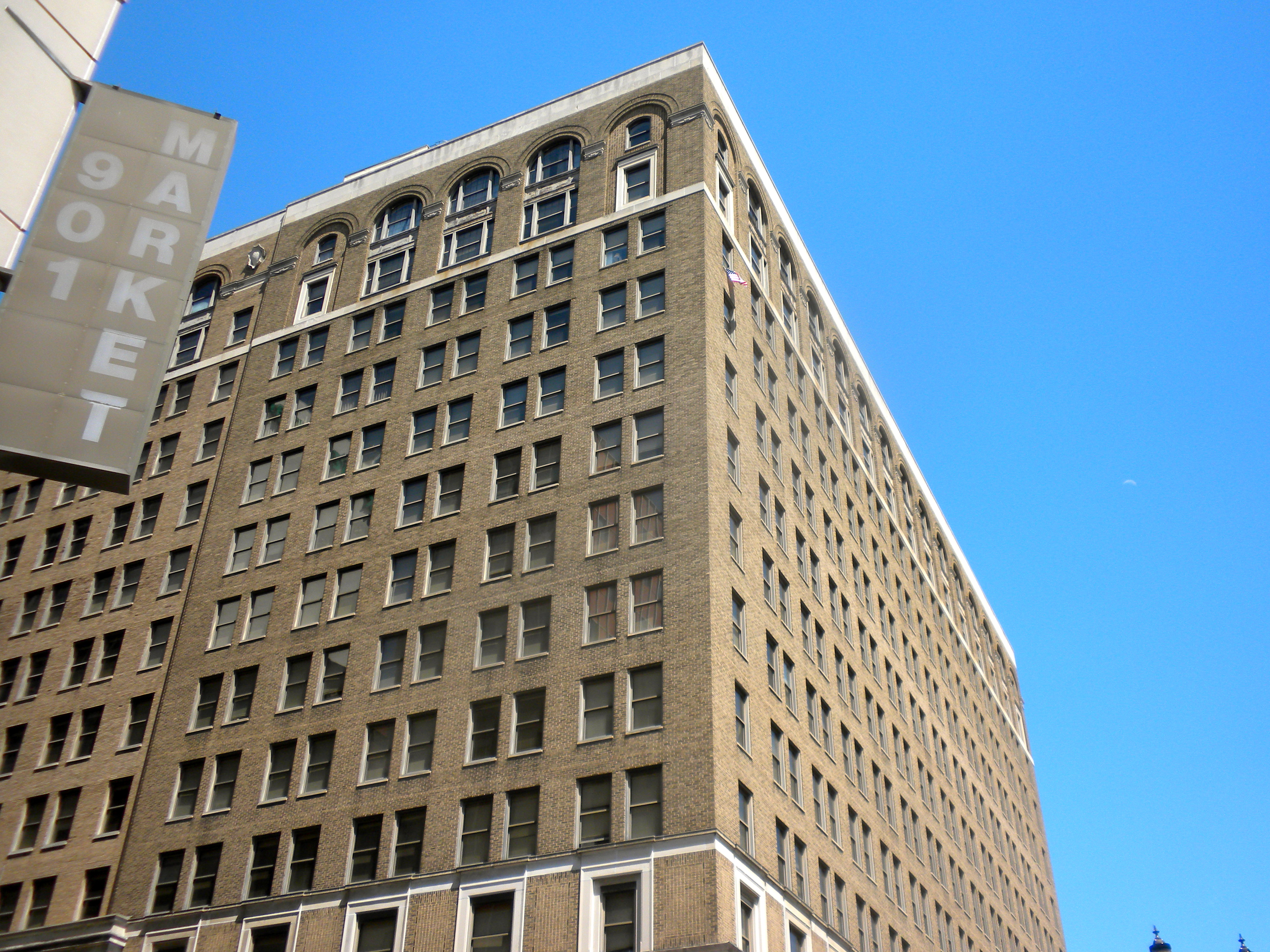
- Delaware Trust Building, June 2010

- Location within Delaware Location within the United States
- Location: 900-912 N. Market St., Wilmington, Delaware
- Coordinates: 39.744814°N 75.547763°W
- Area: less than one acre
- Built: 1921
- Architect: Dennison & Hirons; Converse, Bernard & Harris, Philip T
- Architectural style: Classical Revival
- NRHP reference No.: 03000238
- Added to NRHP: April 18, 2003

Delaware Trust Building, now known as The Residences at Rodney Square, is a historic office building and bank headquarters located at Wilmington, New Castle County, Delaware. It was built in 1921, as a 13-story, 15-bay-by-15 bay, U-shaped steel-frame building in the Classical Revival style. The building has a watertable of gray granite, a limestone-clad two-story plus mezzanine base, and a shaft of buff-colored brick. Atop the building is a limestone cornice. The Market Street elevation features three monumental-scaled arched entrance openings reminiscent of ancient Roman buildings. It once had a 22-story modern office building at its center that has since been removed. The building has been converted to residential use.

It was added to the National Register of Historic Places in 2003.

== History ==
The Delaware Trust Building was built in phases beginning with the first section at 9th and Market Streets in 1919–21. It was commissioned by William du Pont and Alfred I. du Pont to house the Delaware Trust Company and other businesses associated with the du Ponts. The original 13-story building was designed by Dennison & Hirons and cost $1.2 million. In 1930, it was expanded into a U-shaped building with two additional wings extending north along Market and King Streets. Phillip T. Harris of Philadelphia was the architect for this project, which cost a further $1.2 million. A five-story addition was built in 1938 in the center courtyard of the building, which previously had been used for parking.

In 1958–60, a modernist 22-story office tower was added to the center of the building, replacing the 1938 section. This was known as the Hercules Tower after its main tenant, the Hercules Powder Company, and had its own separate entrance at 910 Market Street in addition to being connected to the existing building. The tower was designed by local architect W. Ellis Preston. At 287 feet (87 m), it was the tallest building in Delaware until being surpassed by 1201 North Market Street in 1988.

In 1997, the building was damaged by a fire that burned much of the 11th–15th floors and was ultimately determined to have been caused by arson. The fire caused the building to become contaminated with asbestos fibers and it was left mostly vacant during a protracted battle between the owners and insurer over the cost of cleanup. In 2002, the building was sold and converted to residential use with the name The Residences at Rodney Square. In order to allow more light into the apartments, the Hercules Tower was demolished and the walls facing the courtyard were reconstructed. In 2003, the building was added to the National Register of Historic Places.

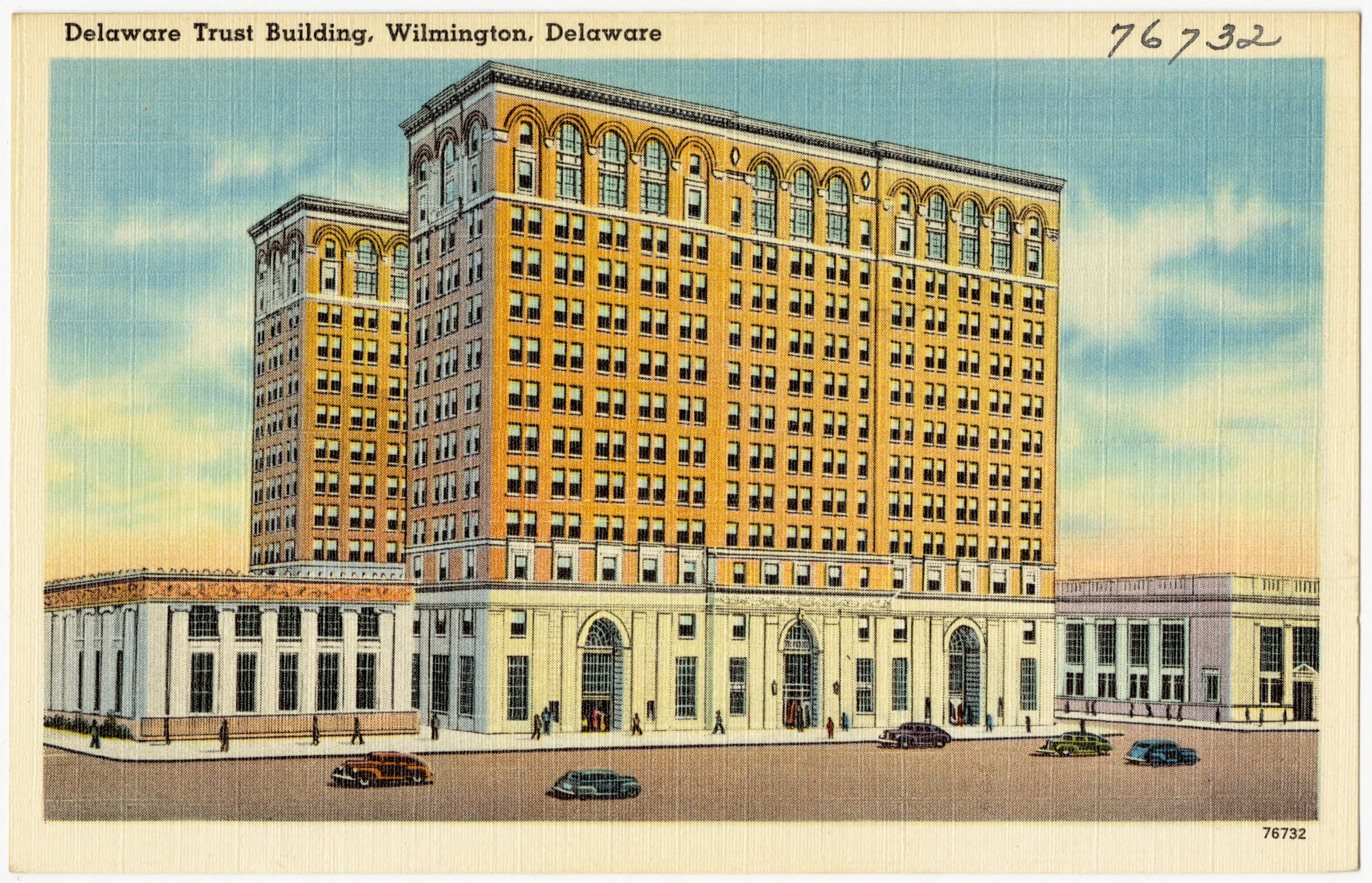
The Delaware Trust Building depicted on a postcard, c. 1930–45

== Architecture ==
In its current configuration, the Delaware Trust Building is a 13-story, U-shaped building with the three sides of the U extending along Market, 9th, and King Streets. The building's two-story base is clad in limestone, with a granite water table, and the upper floors are faced with buff-colored brick and limestone trim. The Market Street elevation has three large arched entrances and is ornamented with Classical Revival elements including pilasters, rusticated stonework, festoons, and other carved details. A dentiled cornice extends around the building above the second floor and there are string courses above the third and eleventh floors. Arched windows on the 13th floor mark the top of the building.
