= Wilmington, Delaware race riot of 1919 =

Wilmington, Delaware riot of 1919
- Part of Red Summer
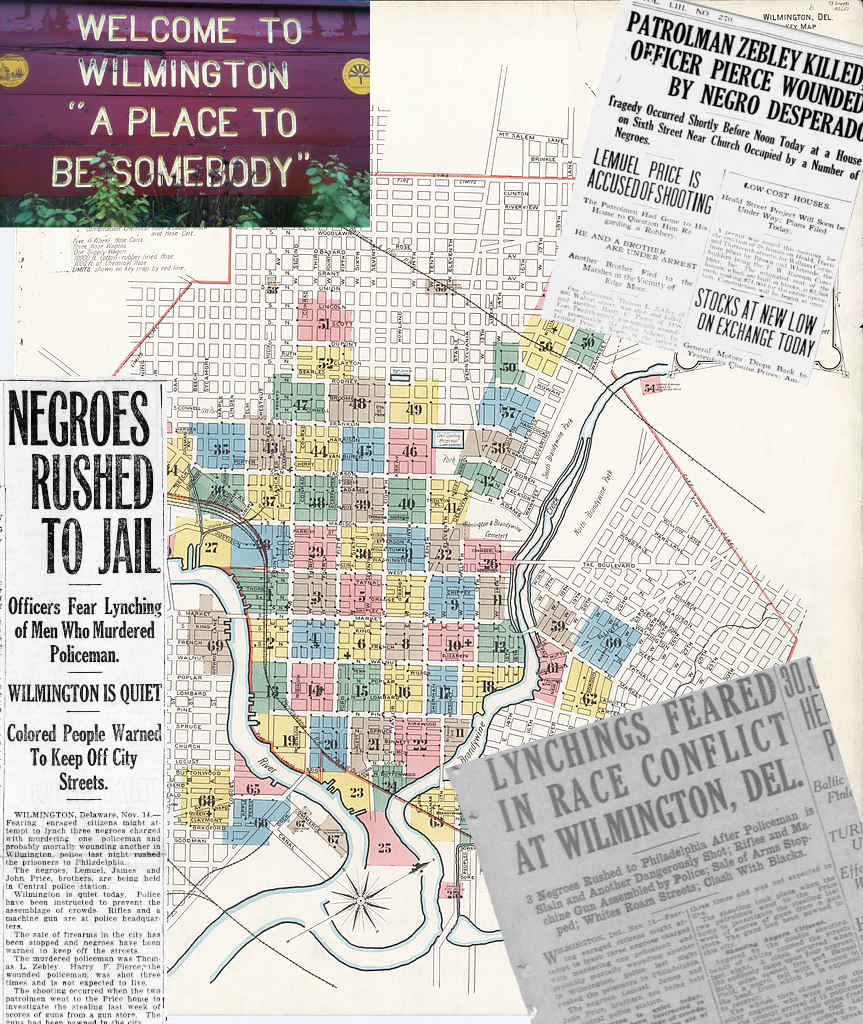
- News Coverage of 1919 Race Riot Wilmington Delaware
- Date: November 13, 1919
- Location: Wilmington, Delaware, United States
- Injuries: At least 1 wounded

The Wilmington, Delaware race riot of 1919 was a violent racial riot between white and black residents of Wilmington, Delaware on November 13, 1919.

== Shooting ==
The Price family were African-American suspects in the robbery of a Wilmington, Delaware gun store. The guns, in turn, had been pawned throughout the city. While raiding the Price house Patrolman Thomas L. Zebley (sometimes spelled Scebley) was killed and Officer Harry F. Pierce was shot twice in the lungs. When the two officers entered the house the three brothers were sleeping. When awakened by the officers the brothers took guns from under their pillows and started shooting. Three brothers were arrested at the scene: Lemuel, James and John Price. Lemuel is thought to have shot Zebley through the heart.

== Race riot ==
As news of the shooting spread an angry white mob grew and tried to lynch the three brothers. Wilmington police were able to prevent this by secreting the brothers to Philadelphia's Central police station. When the mob found out the brothers were out of their reach they turned their anger on the black community. One mob of 300 whites were rampaging through the black part of town. When they encountered 4 black men, the two parties shot at each other and African-American Bannel Fields was wounded with a shot in the head.

Police were able to stop the rioting and enacted a number of measures including stopping the sale of firearms.

== Red Summer of 1919 ==
This uprising was one of several incidents of civil unrest that began in the so-called American Red Summer, of 1919. The Summer consisted of terrorist attacks on black communities, and white oppression in over three dozen cities and counties. In most cases, white mobs attacked African American neighborhoods. In some cases, black community groups resisted the attacks, especially in Chicago and Washington, D.C. Most deaths occurred in rural areas during events like the Elaine massacre in Arkansas, where an estimated 100 to 240 black people and 5 white people were killed. Also occurring in 1919 were the Chicago Race Riot and Washington D.C. race riot which killed 38 and 39 people respectively, and with both having many more non-fatal injuries and extensive property damage reaching up into the millions of dollars.

== See also ==
- Wilmington riot of 1968
- Mass racial violence in the United States
- List of incidents of civil unrest in the United States

== Bibliography ==
Notes

References

- The Daily Times (November 14, 1919). "The Sale Of Fire Arms In Wilmington, Deleware Prohibited Following Race Trouble in That City". The Daily Times. Wilson, North Carolina: P.D. Gold Pub. Co. pp. 1–6. ISSN 2472-2847. OCLC 25415974.
- El Paso Herald (November 14, 1919). "Lynching Feared in Race Conflict at Wilmington, Delaware". El Paso Herald. El Paso, Texas: Herald News Co. pp. 1–24. ISSN 2159-5623. OCLC 18614885.
- The News Journal (November 13, 1919). "Patrolman Zebley Killed; Officer Pierce Wounded by Negro Desperado". The News Journal . Wilmington, Delaware. ISSN 1042-4121. OCLC 16073699.
- The News Scimitar (November 14, 1919). "Wilmington Takes Steps To Prevent Further Trouble". The News Scimitar. Memphis, Tennessee: Gilbert D. Raine. pp. 1–24. ISSN 2473-3199. OCLC 39898320.
- The New York Times (October 5, 1919). "For Action on Race Riot Peril". The New York Times. New York, NY. ISSN 1553-8095. OCLC 1645522.
- Voogd, Jan (2008). Race Riots and Resistance: The Red Summer of 1919. Peter Lang. ISBN 9781433100673. - Total pages: 234
