= Mike Purzycki =

American politician (1945–2026)

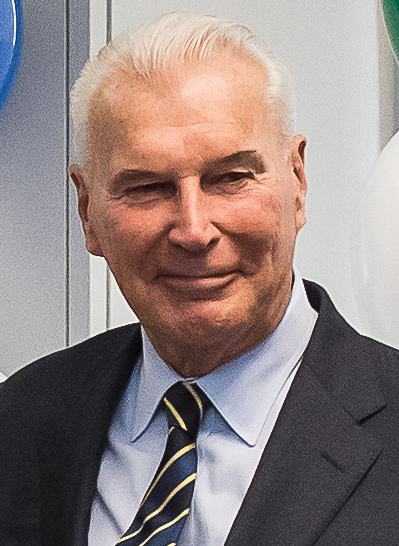
- Purzycki in 2020

56th Mayor of Wilmington
- In office January 3, 2017 – January 7, 2025
- Preceded by: Dennis P. Williams
- Succeeded by: John Carney

Personal details
- Born: 1945 Newark, New Jersey, U.S.
- Died: May 19, 2026 (aged 80) Wilmington, Delaware, U.S.
- Party: Democratic
- Spouse: Bette Richitelli
- Children: 3, including Mick
- Education: University of Delaware (BA); Delaware Law School (JD)

Michael S. Purzycki (1945 – May 19, 2026) was an American businessman and politician who served as the 56th mayor of Wilmington, Delaware, from 2017 to 2025. He previously served as the executive director of the Riverfront Development Corporation and briefly played in the National Football League for the New York Giants in the 1967–1968 season.

== Early life and education ==
Purzycki was born in Newark, New Jersey, in 1945. He graduated from Seton Hall Preparatory School in 1963 and received a football scholarship to the University of Delaware. While at the university, he played football for four years and set every Delaware Fightin' Blue Hens football receiving record. Purzycki graduated from the University of Delaware with a degree in history. After college, he signed a contract to play for the New York Giants in the National Football League for the 1967–1968 season; however, his football career was cut short by injury.

In 1968, Purzycki moved to Delaware. He worked in real estate and attended Delaware Law School at night. He graduated from law school and was admitted to the Delaware bar. He served as an attorney for the Delaware Senate and continued to practice law for more than a decade.

== Political career ==
In 1982, Purzycki was elected to the New Castle Council. He spent nine years as chairman of the council's finance committee and wrote the legislation that would become Delaware's first ethics law.

Purzycki was chosen as the executive director of the Riverfront Development Corporation in 1996. In this role, he was responsible for helping redevelop the blighted Riverfront area of Wilmington. Under his tenure, the former industrial Riverfront became a destination for recreation and dining. He turned $350 million in public funding into a $1 billion private investment and brought over 1,400 residents and 6,000 employees to the Riverfront. Purzycki later served as chairman of the Wilmington Hope Commission, where he oversaw the opening of the Achievement Center in 2014. The Achievement Center helps former prisoners transition back into the community.

In 2016, Purzycki ran for Mayor of Wilmington. On September 13, 2016, he won the Democratic primary with 23.6% of the vote, defeating incumbent Mayor Dennis P. Williams and six other candidates. His was vote was particularly strong in his neighborhood in the northwest part of the city. Former Republican Representative and Governor Mike Castle helped Purzycki campaign to Republicans and Independents, with over 1,200 voters in Wilmington switching their voter registration from Republican to Democratic. Purzycki won the general election on November 8, 2016 with 82% of the vote, defeating Republican real estate professional Robert Martin and Independent Democrat teacher Steven Washington. Purzycki was inaugurated as Mayor on January 3, 2017. He was re-elected in 2020.

== Personal life and death ==
Purzycki lived in the Highlands neighborhood of Wilmington. He married Bette Richitelli in 1984. They have three children together: Gage, Adriane, and Mick. Gage lives at home in Wilmington while Adriane and Mick live in New York City.

Purzycki died on May 19, 2026, in Wilmington, from cancer at the age of 80.

Political offices
Preceded by Dennis P. Williams	Mayor of Wilmington; 2017–2025	Succeeded by John Carney
