= 1201 North Market Street =

Building in Wilmington, Delaware, USA

1201 Market Street
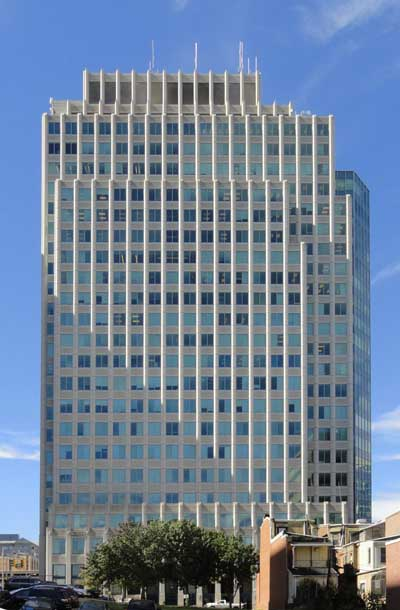
- From the southeast in 2013
- Interactive map of the 1201 Market Street area
- Former names: Chase Manhattan Centre; Chemical Bank Plaza; Manufacturers Hanover Plaza

General information
- Status: Completed
- Type: Commercial offices
- Location: 1201 North Market Street; Wilmington, Delaware
- Coordinates: 39.7480°N 75.5470°W
- Completed: 1988
- Owner: 1201 N. Market St. L.L.C. McConnell Johnson Real Estate L.L.C.
- Operator: McConnell Johnson Real Estate L.L.C.

Height
- Roof: 360 feet (110 m)

Technical details
- Floor count: 23

Design and construction
- Architect: Skidmore, Owings & Merrill
- Main contractor: Turner Construction; Healy Long & Jevin

1201 North Market Street is a 360-foot (110 m), 23-story high rise building or skyscraper in Wilmington, Delaware. It is the tallest building in Wilmington and the state of Delaware. The tower was designed by the architectural firm of Skidmore, Owings & Merrill and opened in 1988. On clear days, the skyline of Center City, Philadelphia, 30 miles to the northeast, can be seen from the top floors.

== See also ==
- List of tallest buildings in Wilmington, Delaware
- List of tallest buildings by U.S. state
