= James M. Baker (mayor) =

American politician (born 1942)

54th Mayor of Wilmington, Delaware
- In office 2001–2013
- Preceded by: James Sills
- Succeeded by: Dennis P. Williams

Personal details
- Born: 1942 (age 83–84) Fostoria, Ohio, U.S.
- Party: Democratic

James M. Baker (born 1942) is an American politician who served as the 54th mayor of Wilmington, Delaware, from 2001 to 2013. He took office in January 2001, during a Special Meeting of the Wilmington City Council, and left office in January 2013.

== Early life ==
Baker was born in Fostoria, Ohio, in 1942. After completing high school there, he joined the United States Air Force. He received an honorable discharge in 1966. Following his discharge he joined VISTA, the domestic Peace Corps program.

== Political life ==
Baker has held staff and executive positions with private and governmental agencies including: Model Cities Program; the Northeast Federal Credit Union; the Governor's Office; and Community Action of Greater Wilmington. He was elected to the Wilmington City Council in 1972. In 1984 he became the first African-American elected City Council President. As mayor, he saw Wilmington memorials erected to Americans killed during World War II and the Korean War. He was a member of the Mayors Against Illegal Guns Coalition, an organization formed in 2006 and co-chaired by New York City mayor Michael Bloomberg and Boston mayor Thomas Menino.

== Personal ==
Mayor Baker is the author of "The Genuine American Music," a two-volume encyclopedia of black musicians, which tells the story of black music in America through text, rare photos, and original illustrations.

Political offices
Preceded by James Sills	Mayor of Wilmington, Delaware; 2001–2013	Succeeded by Dennis P. Williams
