= Wilmington riot of 1968 =

King assassination riots in Delaware, US

- Part of the King assassination riots
- Date: April 9–10, 1968
- Location: Wilmington, Delaware
- Caused by: Assassination of Martin Luther King Jr.
- Result: Property damaged, citizens arrested, order restored, 10 month military occupation by Delaware Army National Guard

Parties
Delaware State Police	rioters

Casualties
- Injuries: 40
- Arrested: 154

The Wilmington Riot of 1968 occurred in Wilmington, Delaware, in April of that year following the assassination of Martin Luther King Jr. The riot did not cause any fatalities, though there were numerous injuries, arrests, and buildings burned. Despite the quick cessation of rioting, the governor refused to recall the Delaware Army National Guard and Delaware Air National Guard, leaving them in the city as an occupying force until the following year.

== Background ==
Prior to the events of the late 1960s, tensions were already running high in Wilmington. There had already been a race riot in 1919. The flight of white city dwellers to the suburbs, migration of southern blacks to the city, and lingering bad feelings from the construction of I-95 resulted in a divided city, and attempts by local leaders to alleviate the social issue plaguing the city were unsuccessful. Heightened racial tensions and altercations in July 1967 were followed by two days of sporadic vandalism, looting, and firebombing. At the request of Wilmington Mayor John Babiarz, state police were summoned to increase patrols. For his part, Governor Charles L. Terry (a southern-style Democrat) publicly warned of minority violence and conspiracies and placed fifteen hundred National Guardsmen on standby alert at Wilmington's airport. He also proposed and signed legislation granting him sole authority to impose martial law and ban the sale of alcohol and established a riot commission. In addition to the Delaware National Guard, the Governor activated the entire Delaware State Police Department. All days off were canceled, vacations were canceled and all troopers were to report to their assigned Troop. The Delaware State Police who were nearest to the City of Wilmington were sent to Troop 2 located south of the city. Only a skeleton force was left at the other Troops located in New Castle County. The Troopers who were assigned to Kent and Sussex counties Troops were sent to Troop 2. Once the lower county Troopers arrived at Troop 2 they were paired with those of New Castle County. Any request for law enforcement assistance from the Wilmington Police Department was sent to Troop 2.

== Events ==
In the wake of the assassination of Martin Luther King Jr. on April 4, 1968, a large number of black youths converged on the main downtown business area of Wilmington and began looting stores April 9–10, 1968. A report of sniper fire prompted Democratic mayor Babiarz to declare a state of emergency, to impose a curfew, and to request assistance from Governor Terry. The two-day riot that occurred after the assassination was small compared with riots in other cities, but its aftermath highlighted the depth of Wilmington's racial problem.

On April 9, 1968, Governor Terry ordered the twenty-eight-hundred-strong National Guard to patrol the streets of Wilmington and to restore order. He later ordered National Guard troops to be deployed also in Rehoboth Beach and at the campus of the predominantly black Delaware State College in Dover. Within a week, Mayor Babiarz requested withdrawal of the soldiers, but Governor Terry refused, citing unspecified intelligence reports of the potential of renewed and more violent racial disturbances.

Despite repeated requests by Mayor Babiarz and other notables to remove the National Guard, Governor Terry responded, "The Guard is going to stay in Wilmington until we're sure people and property owners are adequately protected." As a result, Babiarz openly broke with Terry and Wilmington remained under military occupation for the remainder of 1968 – nine months – reportedly the longest occupation of an American city by armed forces since the Civil War.

When the Governor decided to activate the Delaware National Guard he also decided that the Delaware State Police should be part of any Guard unit sent into the City of Wilmington (each unit was composed of one state police car and three military jeeps with three armed guardsmen in each jeep.) Delaware State Troopers were with each group sent into the City to ensure that there was a law enforcement representative who could assist the soldiers make informed decisions concerning the use of force. The participating units, including Air National Guard, were helpful in protecting the fire departments who were responding to the numerous fires that had been set by rioters. Reports of firemen hearing gun shots forced many fire fighters to withdraw from fighting fires until the units could protect them.

After several days of rioting and intervention by many agencies, the City of Wilmington began to quiet down. However, the Governor had declared that he would keep the city safe. He instituted an order to have three Delaware State Troopers and multiple vehicles manned by Delaware National Guardsmen patrol the streets of Wilmington. Each unit could respond as needed with sufficient force to quell almost any level of threat. The units worked in support of the Wilmington Police Department in addition to having independent authority to act on their own. The three units became known as the "Rat Patrol" named after the popular T.V. series by the same name. The "Rat Patrol" patrolled the streets of Wilmington until Governor Peterson took office.

== Impact ==
The severity of the disorder in Wilmington following King's assassination is questionable. One writer claimed that "21 buildings were destroyed by fire, 40 people were injured…154 citizens were arrested," and arms caches were found. On the other hand, another writer asserted that "only a dozen persons were reportedly injured and property damage was minimal." The historian Carol Hoffecker concluded that "the Wilmington riot was a small, short-lived affair that did relatively little damage."

Whatever the case, the prolonged military occupation of Wilmington received nationwide attention, increasingly tarnished the city's image, and became an embarrassment to Wilmington's corporate elite, who unsuccessfully tried to persuade Terry to pull the National Guard out. In November 1968 – six months after the riots – the National Guard was still patrolling Wilmington over the objections of city leaders, who accused the governor of playing to white fears in an election year. City Supervisor O. Francis Biondi told the New York Times, "the National Guard here has become a symbol of white suppression of the black community. That may be a useful way to get elected, but who wants to … run a city under those circumstances?" When Governor Terry sought to discredit the Biracial Coordinating Committee, comprising corporate representatives, the committee publicly stated that the National Guard patrols "create an aura of police state repression which is drastically reducing the effectiveness of longtime programs aimed at correcting the urban conditions that cause riots."

=== Effects on the 1968 Delaware gubernatorial election ===
The 1968 Delaware gubernatorial campaign was dominated by the issue of the National Guard in Wilmington. After his defeat by Russell Peterson for reelection in November, lame-duck governor Terry still refused to withdraw the National Guard. It was left to Governor Peterson, and within an hour of his inauguration in January 1969 he signed the order finally ending the military occupation of Wilmington.

=== Effects on urban development in Wilmington ===
The riot intensified suburban fears of the city and set the stage for the deep animosities that developed during the 1970s over interdistrict school desegregation and the relocation of the region's primary health care facility.

== See also ==
- Wilmington, Delaware race riot of 1919
- List of incidents of civil unrest in the United States
- Long hot summer of 1967
- Protests of 1968
