= Wilmington Club =

- U.S. National Register of Historic Places
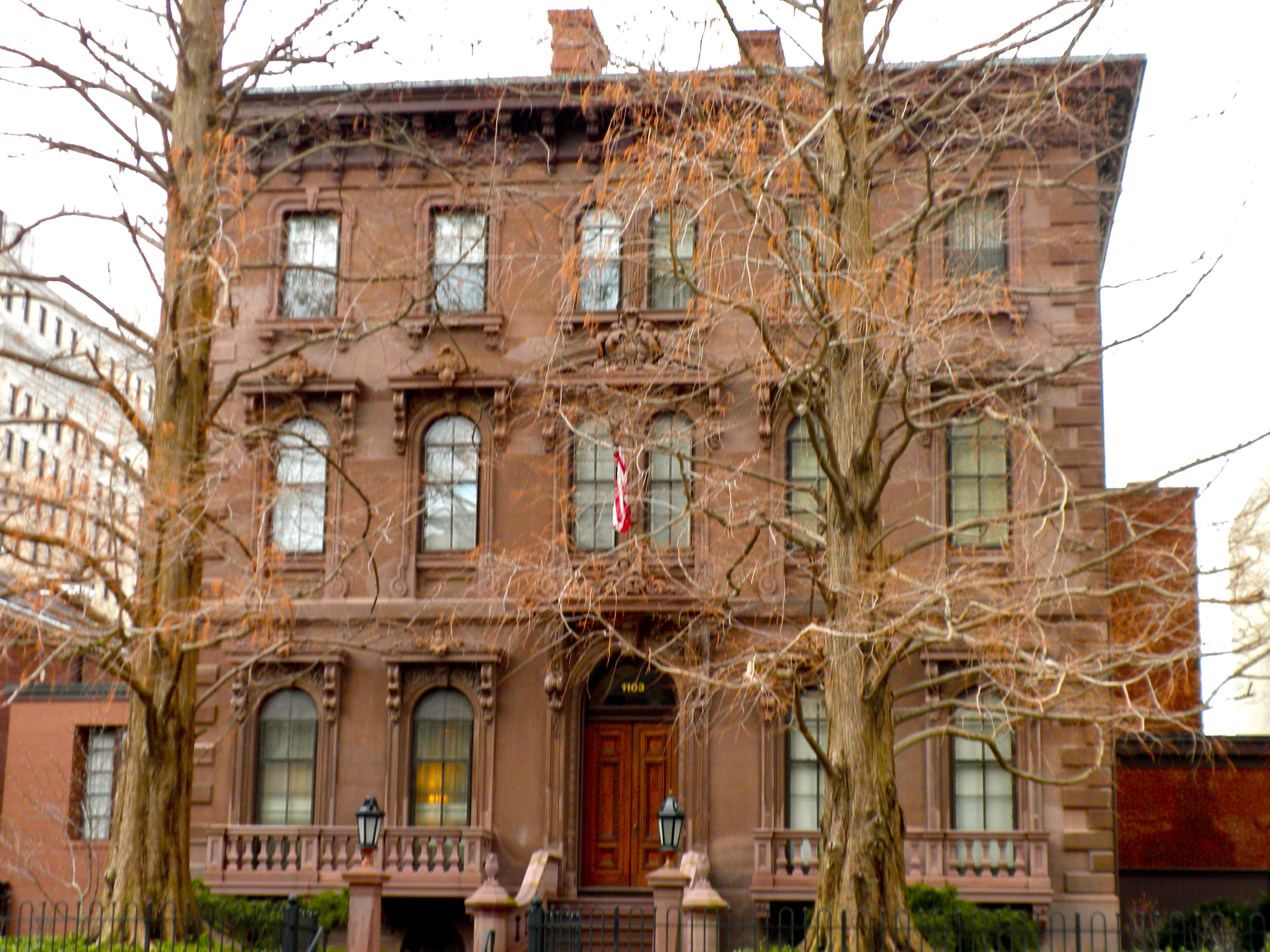
- Wilmington Club, January 2010

- Location within Delaware Location within the United States
- Location: 1103 N. Market St., Wilmington, Delaware
- Coordinates: 39°44′49″N 75°32′51″W
- Area: 0.7 acres (0.28 ha)
- Built: 1863
- Architect: Thomas Dixon
- Architectural style: Italianate
- NRHP reference No.: 06000282
- Added to NRHP: April 19, 2006

Wilmington Club, also known as the John Merrick House, is a historic clubhouse located at Wilmington, New Castle County, Delaware, United States. It was designed by architect Thomas Dixon and built in 1863, as a three-story, five bay "T"-plan brownstone dwelling in the Italianate style. The Wilmington Club purchased the building in 1900, and expanded it between 1936 and 1950 and in 1966. The Club incorporated in 1877.

== History ==
Although oral history suggests that Edmund G. Lind of Baltimore was the architect of record, numerous newspaper reports from 1863 suggest that the architect was actually Thomas Dixon, who also practiced in Baltimore. Dixon was architect of the Wilmington Grand Opera House built several years later.

The March 13, 1863 issue of The Daily Gazette, as well as the March 10, 1863 issue of The Delaware State Journal and the March 12, 1863 issue of The Delaware Republican ran the following news article: "Improvement. H.F. Dure has contracted with John Merrick, Esq., to erect a beautiful mansion for him, on his lot located on Market street, between Eleventh and Twelfth streets, for about $21,000. This house when finished, will be one of the most convenient and substantial residences in this city. It will have all of the modern improvements, and will be built in the best style. Mr. Thomas Dixon, formerly of this city, now of Baltimore, is the Architect. Perkins & Weldie, have contracted with Mr. Dure to do the Brick work: Murdick & Duff the Painting, and Robert Haddock the Plastering. The lot has been staked out and the digging of the cellars will be commenced immediately. The mansion is to be completed by the 25th of December next."

The building was added to the National Register of Historic Places in 2006.
