= 2024 Wilmington mayoral election =

- November 5, 2024
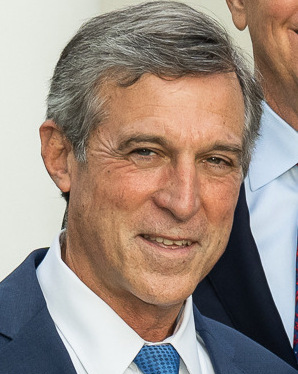
Nominee	John Carney
Party	Democratic
Popular vote	24,191
Percentage	100.00%
Mayor before election
Mike Purzycki
Democratic
Elected mayor
John Carney
Democratic

The 2024 Wilmington mayoral election was held on Tuesday, November 5, 2024, to elect the mayor of Wilmington, Delaware. Following Incumbent mayor Mike Purzycki's decision to not seek re-election, term limited Governor John Carney and former Wilmington treasurer Velda Jones-Potter ran for the Democratic nomination. Jones-Potter had previously challenged Purzycki's 2020 reelection bid. On September 10, 2024, Carney defeated in the primary Jones-Potter by 743 votes. Due to the dominance of the Delaware Democratic Party, no Republicans ran for the seat. Carney ran unopposed in the general election and received over 24 thousand votes. With his victory he became the first sitting governor ever to be elected mayor.

== Background ==
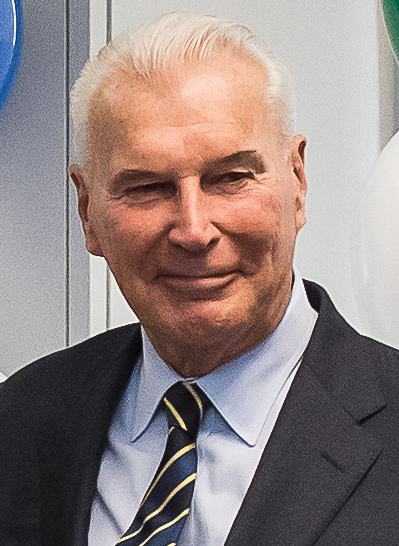
Outgoing Mayor Mike Purzycki in 2020

The Delaware Democratic Party dominates the politics of Delaware. The party holds a supermajority in both chambers of the State Legislature and holds all statewide seats. The final time Republicans won statewide in Delaware was in 2014 when the elections for Delaware Auditor of Accounts and Delaware State Treasurer were won by Tom Wagner and Ken Simpler respectively. In 2018, Wagner did not seek reelection while Simpler was defeated by a Democratic challenger.

In 2020, following a competitive primary incumbent Democratic Mike Purzycki won the democratic nomination with 42 percent of the vote. He defeated political rivals, former City Councilmen Justen Wright and Wilmington City Treasurer Velda Jones-Potter. He was uncontested in the general election winning re-election to a second term.

== Candidates ==
- John Carney (Democrat), incumbent Governor (2017–2025) and former U.S. Representative from Delaware's at-large congressional district (2011–2017)
- Velda Jones-Potter (Democrat), former Wilmington City Treasurer (2017–2021), former Delaware State Treasurer (2009–2011), and unsuccessful mayoral candidate in 2020

== Democratic primary ==
Purzycki had considered running in 2024. However, on October 3, 2023, Purzycki revealed that he would not be seeking a third term citing his age and a desire to spend time with his family. Incumbent Governor of Delaware John Carney, who was unable to seek re-election as governor due to term limits, decided to enter the race. Velda Jones-Potter, former treasurer of Wilmington and Delaware as a whole, also decided to enter the race. Jones-Potter had previously challenged Purzycki for the nomination in 2020. On August 9, Carney and Jones-Potter participated in a public forum debate hosted by the Rotary Club of Wilmington. Issues included education, quality of life, and job creation.

=== Results ===
The primary election was held on September 10, 2024. Carney received 5,308 votes, winning with over 53 percent of the vote. He defeated Jones-Potter by 743 votes.

Democratic primary results
Party	Candidate	Votes	%
Democratic	John Carney	5,308	53.76%
Democratic	Velda Jones-Potter	4,565	46.24%
Total votes		9,873	100.00%

== General election ==
Due to the Democratic party's dominance over both Wilmington and Delaware at large, the Republican State Committee of Delaware (GOP) did not run a candidate. The News Journal's Anitra Johnson noted that, with the exception of a few competitive City Council seats, most candidates in Wilmington ran unopposed. The election was held on November 5, 2024, since no other candidates ran in the general election, Carney won the election unopposed. With his victory he became the first sitting United States governor to be elected to a mayoral office. After the results came in, Janyce Colmery, a member of the Delaware GOP told Chis Barrish of WHYY-TV that result was expected and that "Wilmington’s a big problem because that’s never going to change. I mean, they just brought in Carney as their mayor. Are you kidding me?”

2024 Wilmington mayoral election
Party	Candidate	Votes	%
Democratic	John Carney	24,191	100.00%
Total votes		24,191	100.00%

=== Aftermath ===
On November 27, Carney announced he would be reappointing the incumbent chiefs of the fire and police departments. Carney resigned from his position as Governor on January 7, 2025 to be sworn as mayor.Bethany Hall-Long, the outgoing Lieutenant Governor, was sworn in as Governor to finish the final two weeks of Carney's term, before being succeeded by Matt Meyer, the winner of the 2024 Delaware gubernatorial election.
