= 2014 Delaware elections =

- November 4, 2014

A general election was held in the U.S. state of Delaware on November 4, 2014. Half of Delaware's executive officers were up for election as well as a United States Senate seat and Delaware's at-large seat in the United States House of Representatives. Primary elections were held on September 9, 2014. As of 2025, this was the last time Republicans won any statewide election in Delaware.

== Federal ==
=== Senate ===
Incumbent Democratic senator Chris Coons, who was elected in a 2010 special election, ran for re-election to a first full term in office.

He faced Republican businessman Kevin Wade and Green Party computer science professor Andrew Groff in the general election, both of whom were their respective parties nominees for Delaware's other U.S. Senate seat in 2012. Coons was re-elected with 56% of the vote to Wade's 42% and Groff's 2%

United States Senate election in Delaware, 2014
Party	Candidate	Votes	%
Democratic	Chris Coons (incumbent)	130,655	55.83
Republican	Kevin Wade	98,823	42.23
Green	Andrew Groff	4,560	1.95
Total votes		234,038	100.0
Democratic hold			

=== House of Representatives ===
Delaware has a single at-large congressional district. Incumbent Democratic U.S. Representative John Carney, who has represented the state in Congress since 2011, ran for re-election to a third term in office.

Carney faced Republican Rose Izzo, Green Bernie August and Libertarian Scott Gesty in the general election. He was re-elected with 59% to Izzo's 37%, August's 2% and Gesty's 2%.

== State ==
=== Constitutional officers ===
==== Attorney general ====
Incumbent Democratic Attorney General Beau Biden did not run for re-election to a third term in office. He was instead going to run for Governor of Delaware in the 2016 election to succeed term-limited Democratic governor Jack Markell, but he died of brain cancer on May 30, 2015, at the age of 46.

Lieutenant Governor of Delaware Matthew Denn was unopposed for the Democratic nomination. State Prosecutor Kathleen Jennings had considered running, but decided not to and endorsed Denn.

The Republicans attempted to recruit former United States Attorney for the District of Delaware Colm Connolly. He considered running, but declined to do so. The Republican nominee was corporate attorney Ted Kittila, who was unopposed for his party's nomination.

Also running were Independent Party nominee David Graham, a tax auditor, former Republican candidate for governor and attorney general and the Independent Party-endorsed write-in candidate for Governor in 2012; Green Party nominee Catherine Damavandi, who served as a deputy attorney general of Delaware from 2000 to 2014; and Libertarian John Machurek, a candidate for the State House in 2012.

Delaware Attorney General election, 2014
Party	Candidate	Votes	%
Democratic	Matthew Denn	121,410	52.76
Republican	Ted Kittila	90,257	39.22
Green	Catherine Damavandi	10,599	4.61
Independent Party	David Graham	4,879	2.12
Libertarian	John Machurek	2,984	1.3
Total votes		230,129	100.0
Democratic hold			

==== Treasurer ====
2014 Delaware State Treasurer election
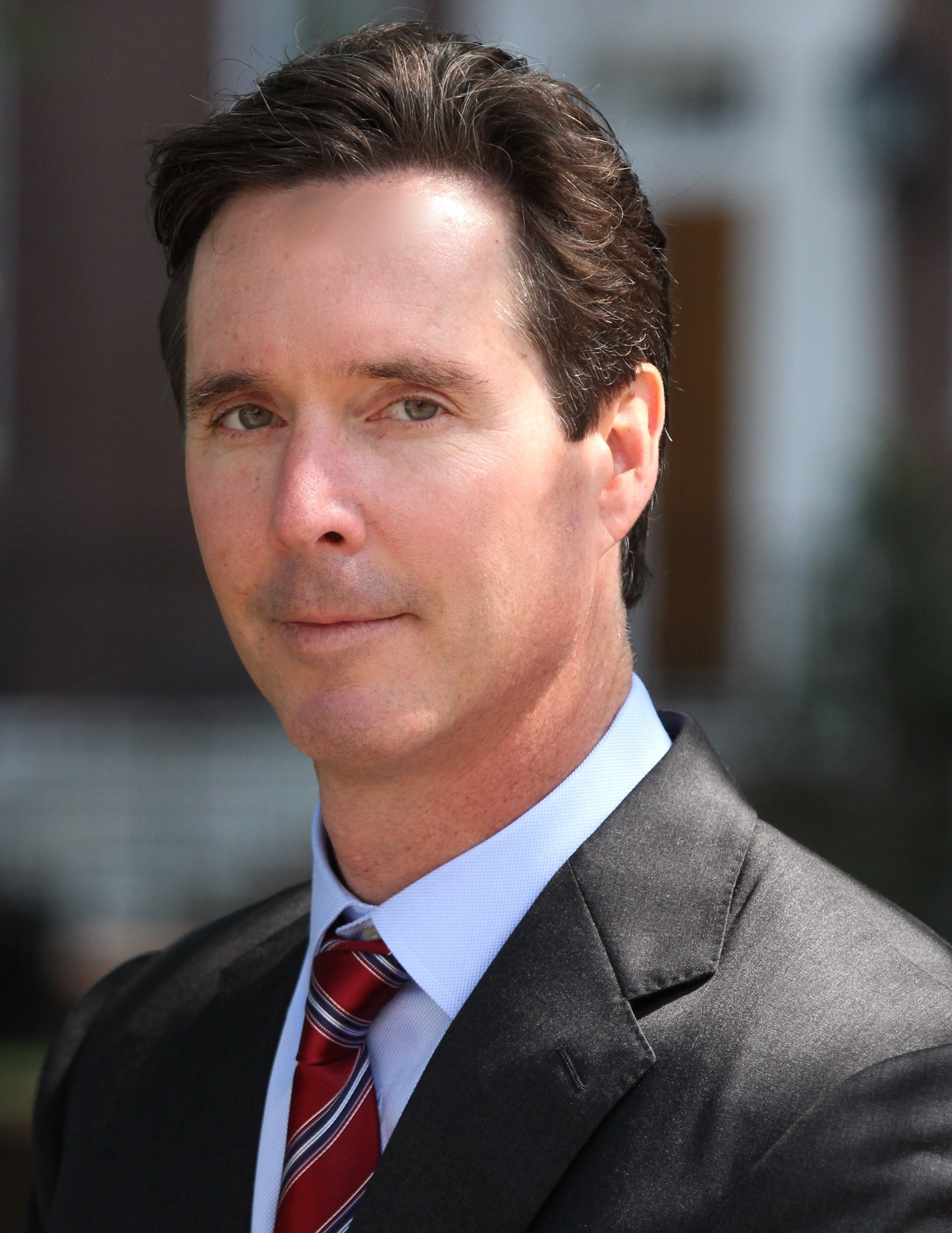

Nominee	Ken Simpler	Sean Barney
Party	Republican	Democratic
Popular vote	123,105	100,218
Percentage	53.2%	43.6%
- Simpler: 40–50% 50–60% 60–70% 70–80% Barney: 40–50% 50–60% 60–70% 70–80% 80–90%
Treasurer before election
Chipman Flowers Jr.
Democratic
Elected Treasurer
Ken Simpler
Republican

Incumbent Democratic State Treasurer Chipman L. Flowers, Jr. had planned to run for re-election to a second term in office, but after being dogged by controversy through his term in office over his use of office credit cards and travel spending and his clashes with Governor Markell and the state Cash Management Policy Board, he announced his withdrawal from the race on August 15, 2014. However, he filed a withdrawal form that was postdated to withdraw him from the race on August 28, which meant that he couldn't be removed from the ballot until that date, a move which drew criticism. His failure to withdraw in time meant that his name appeared on absentee ballots and though his name was covered at polling places, he did still receive some votes. The Democratic primary was won by Sean Barney, a former policy director for Governor Markell and former adviser to U.S. Senator Tom Carper, who had announced his candidacy before Flowers had attempted to run for re-election.

Democratic primary election results
Party	Candidate	Votes	%
Democratic	Sean Barney	2,022	71.05
Democratic	Chip Flowers	824	28.95
Total votes		2,846	100.0

Two individuals ran for the Republican party's nomination, money manager Ken Simpler and Sher Valenzuela, former Republican candidate for lieutenant governor in 2012. The Republican primary campaign was a bitter one, marked by infighting and with outside spending behind both candidates, who criticised each other frequently.

Republican primary election results
Party	Candidate	Votes	%
Republican	Ken Simpler	13,491	53.88
Republican	Sher Valenzuela	11,549	46.12
Total votes		25,040	100.0

Also running was Green Party nominee David Chandler, a mathematics professor at the University of Delaware.

Delaware State Treasurer election, 2014
Party	Candidate	Votes	%
Republican	Ken Simpler	123,105	53.59
Democratic	Sean Barney	100,218	43.63
Green	David Chandler	6,373	2.77
Total votes		229,696	100.0
Republican gain from Democratic			

Simpler's win meant that he became the first non-incumbent Republican to win a statewide election in Delaware since 1994.

==== Auditor of Accounts ====
2014 Delaware State Auditor election
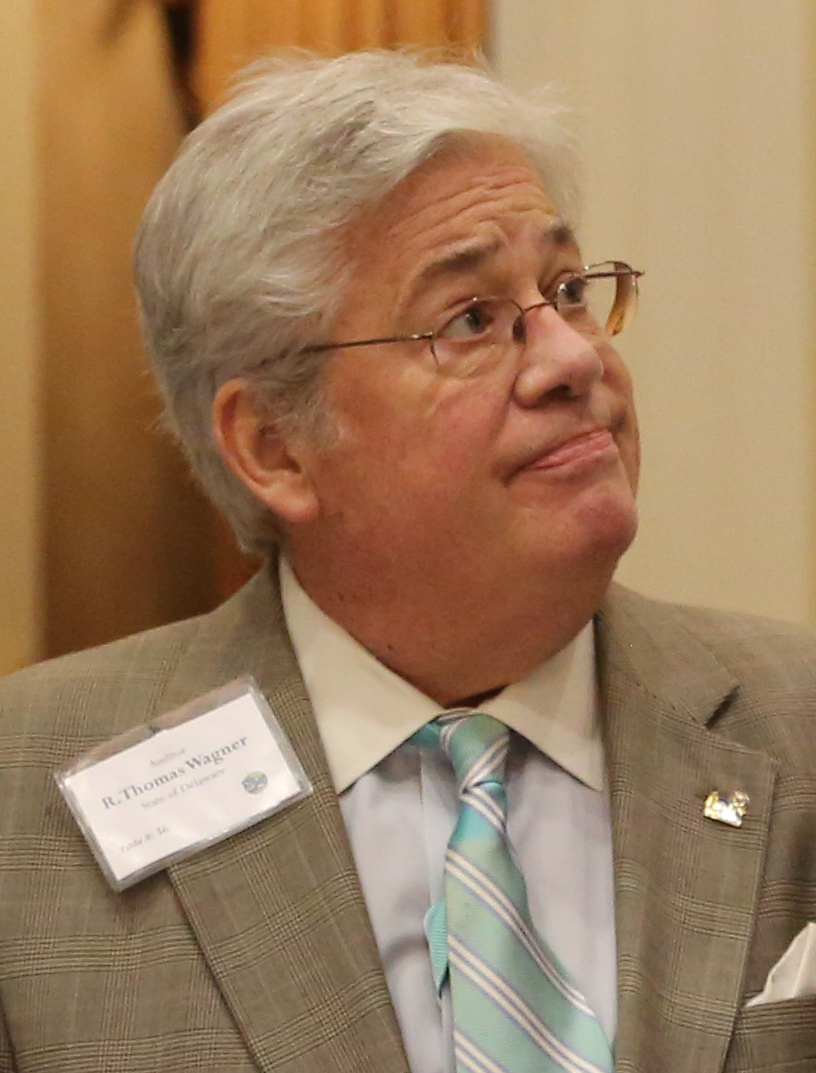

Nominee	Tom Wagner	Brenda Mayrack
Party	Republican	Democratic
Popular vote	123,100	103,939
Percentage	54.2%	45.7%
- Wagner: 50–60% 60–70% 70–80% Mayrack: 50–60% 60–70% 70–80% 80–90%
Auditor before election
Tom Wagner
Republican
Elected Auditor
Tom Wagner
Republican

Incumbent Republican Auditor of Accounts R. Thomas Wagner, Jr. ran for re-election to a seventh full term in office. He was unopposed in the Republican primary.

Two Democrats ran for their party's nomination: Certified Public Accountant and candidate for Auditor in 2010 Kenneth Matlusky; and businesswoman, attorney and former executive director of the Delaware Democratic Party Brenda Mayrack.

Democratic primary election results
Party	Candidate	Votes	%
Democratic	Brenda Mayrack	12,091	54.99
Democratic	Kenneth Matlusky	9,896	45.01
Total votes		21,987	100.0

Delaware Auditor of Accounts election, 2014
Party	Candidate	Votes	%
Republican	R. Thomas Wagner, Jr. (incumbent)	123,100	54.22
Democratic	Brenda Mayrack	103,939	45.78
Total votes		227,039	100.0
Republican hold			
