= 2026 Delaware State Treasurer election =

- November 3, 2026
Nominee	Ted Lauzen	Mike Ramone
Party	Democratic	Republican
Popular vote	235,779	141,812
Percentage	62.44	37.56%
- Lauzen: 50–60% 60–70% 70–80% 80–90% >90% Ramone: 50–60% 60–70% 70–80% 80–90% No votes
State Treasurer before election
Colleen Davis
Democratic
Elected State Treasurer
Ted Lauzen
Democratic

The 2026 Delaware State Treasurer election was held on November 3, 2026, to elect the Delaware State Treasurer. Primary elections were held on September 15, 2026. Wealth advisor Ted Lauzen won the Democratic primary over two opponents, while former state representative Mike Ramone won the Republican primary unopposed.

Incumbent Democratic state treasurer Colleen Davis who was re-elected in 2022 with 53.6% of the vote, declined to seek re-election to a third term in office.

== Democratic primary ==
=== Candidates ===
==== Nominee ====
- Ted Lauzen, wealth advisor and son of Kane County treasurer Chris Lauzen

==== Eliminated in primary ====
- Mike Miller, businessman and perennial candidate
- Michael Smith, economist and candidate for the 21st District of the Delaware House of Representatives in 2024

==== Declined ====
- Colleen Davis, incumbent state treasurer

=== Endorsements ===
Ted Lauzen

Political parties

- Delaware Democratic Party

Organizations

- VoteVets

=== Polling ===
Poll source	Date(s) administered	Sample size (Note: Key: A – all adults RV – registered voters LV – likely voters V – unclear)	Margin of error	Ted Lauzen	Mike Miller	Michael Smith	Other	Undecided
RedBox Research (Note: Poll sponsored by A Fight Worth Having super PAC)	September 13, 2026	1,082 (RV)	± 3.3%	33%	18%	13%	8% (Note: "Prefer not to answer" & "Would not vote in this race" with 3%; "Someone else" with 2%; "Did not vote in this race" with 0%)	29%

=== Results ===
Primary results by county: Lauzen: 40–50%; 50–60%

Democratic primary results
Party	Candidate	Votes	%
Democratic	Ted Lauzen	38,566	45.3
Democratic	Mike Miller	27,561	32.4
Democratic	Michael Smith	19,042	22.3
Total votes		85,169	100.0

== Republican primary ==
=== Candidates ===
==== Nominee ====
- Mike Ramone, former state representative (2008–2024) and nominee for governor in 2024

=== Endorsements ===
Mike Ramone

Political parties

- Delaware Republican Party

== General election ==
=== Results ===
2026 Delaware State Treasurer election
Party	Candidate	Votes	%	±%
Democratic	Ted Lauzen	235,779	62.44%	
Republican	Mike Ramone	141,812	37.56%	
Total votes		377,591	100.0%	
Democratic hold				

== Notes ==
Partisan clients
