= 2018 Delaware elections =

- November 6, 2018

A general election was held in the U.S. state of Delaware on November 6, 2018. Half of Delaware's executive officers were up for election, as well as a United States Senate seat and Delaware's at-large seat in the United States House of Representatives. Primary elections were held on September 6, 2018.

In the general election, Democrats took over all statewide offices and defeated two of the highest ranking Republicans in the Delaware General Assembly. Those races were all won by Democratic women, putting a record number of women in statewide elected offices in Delaware. The Democratic Party became the first party to hold all nine statewide offices in Delaware since the Republican Party in 1970.

== State ==
=== Constitutional officers ===
==== Attorney general ====
Incumbent Democratic attorney general Matthew Denn did not run for reelection to a second term in office. The Republican Party originally nominated former chief Sussex County prosecutor Peggy Marshall Thomas, however Thomas later withdrew and the party nominated former New Castle County attorney Bernard Pepukayi.

Former New Castle County chief administrative officer Kathy Jennings won the Democratic nomination, defeating three opponents, and went on to defeat Pepukayi in the general election.

Democratic primary results
Party	Candidate	Votes	%
Democratic	Kathy Jennings	46,038	56.6
Democratic	LaKresha Roberts	17,584	21.6
Democratic	Chris Johnson	12,194	15.0
Democratic	Tim Mullaney	5,513	6.8
Margin of victory		28,454	35.0%
Turnout		81,329	25.4%
Total votes		81,329	100.0

Delaware Attorney General election, 2018
Party	Candidate	Votes	%
Democratic	Kathy Jennings	218,332	61.31%
Republican	Bernard Pepukayi	137,725	38.69%
Total votes		356,057	100%
Democratic hold			

==== Treasurer ====
Republican nominee and incumbent state treasurer Ken Simpler, Democratic nominee Colleen Davis, and Green nominee David Chandler (who was also the nominee in 2014), were all unopposed in their respective primaries. Davis won the general election, denying Simpler a second term in office.

Delaware State Treasurer election, 2018
Party	Candidate	Votes	%
Democratic	Colleen Davis	187,225	52.36%
Republican	Ken Simpler (incumbent)	163,999	45.87%
Green	David Chandler	6,300	1.77%
Total votes		357,524	100%
Democratic gain from Republican			

==== Auditor of Accounts ====
2018 Delaware State Auditor election
Nominee	Kathy McGuiness	James Spadola
Party	Democratic	Republican
Popular vote	205,611	149,479
Percentage	57.9%	42.1%
- McGuiness: 50–60% 60–70% 70–80% 80–90% Spadola: 50–60% 60–70%
Auditor before election
Tom Wagner
Republican
Elected Auditor
Kathy McGuiness
Democratic

Incumbent Republican State Auditor Tom Wagner did not run for reelection to an eighth term. Republican nominee James Spadola was unopposed in his respective primary and won the nomination.

Kathy McGuiness won the Democratic nomination, defeating two opponents, and went on to win the general election against Spadola.

Democratic primary results
Party	Candidate	Votes	%
Democratic	Kathy McGuiness	33,240	41.9
Democratic	Kathleen Davies	27,748	34.9
Democratic	Dennis E. Williams	18,431	23.2
Total votes		79,419	100

Delaware State Auditor election, 2018
Party	Candidate	Votes	%
Democratic	Kathy McGuiness	205,611	57.90%
Republican	James Spadola	149,479	42.10%
Total votes		355,090	100%
Democratic gain from Republican			

=== General Assembly ===
==== Senate ====
The state of Delaware had various State Senate elections in the general election.
