= 2018 Delaware State Treasurer election =

- November 6, 2018
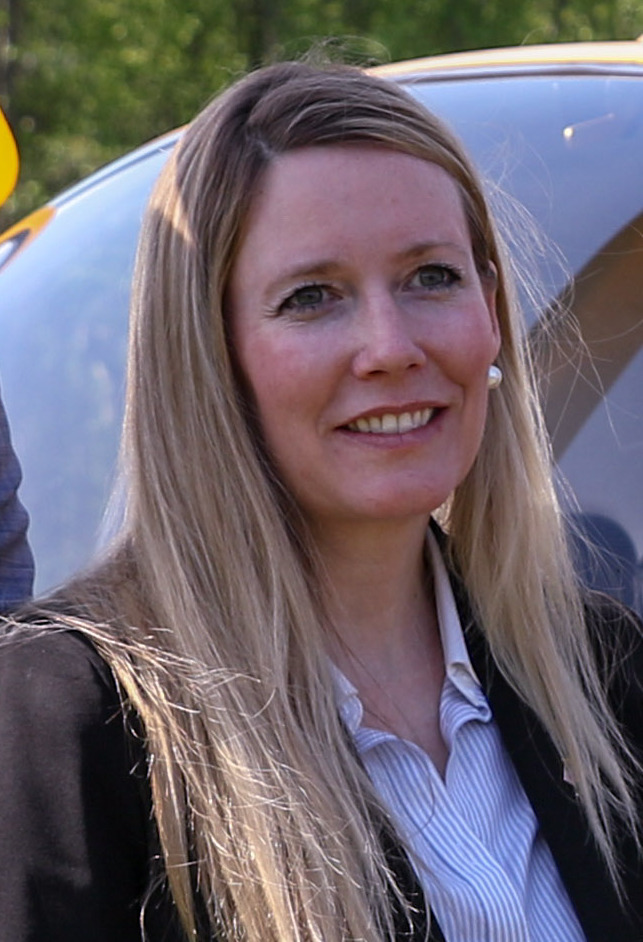

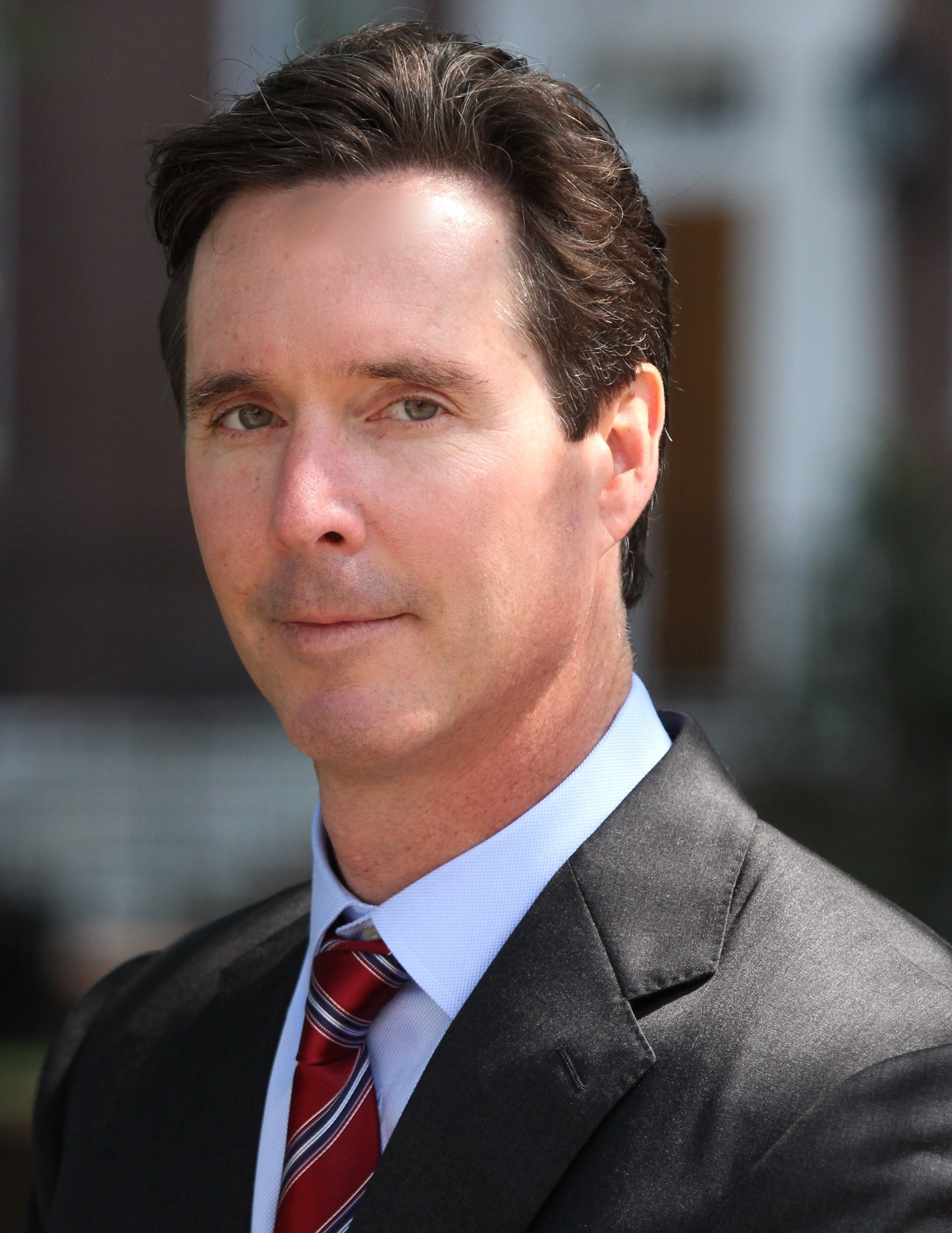
Nominee	Colleen Davis	Ken Simpler
Party	Democratic	Republican
Popular vote	187,240	164,001
Percentage	52.36%	45.86%
- Davis: 40–50% 50–60% 60–70% 70–80% 80–90% >90% Simpler: 40–50% 50–60% 60–70% 70–80% 80–90% Tie: 40–50% No data
Treasurer before election
Ken Simpler
Republican
Elected Treasurer
Colleen Davis
Democratic

The 2018 Delaware State Treasurer election took place on November 6, 2018. The Delaware primary election for federal and state candidates took place on September 6, 2018. Incumbent State Treasurer Ken Simpler announced on November 2, 2017, that he would seek re-election to a second term. He lost the general election to Democratic nominee Colleen Davis in a major upset.

== Republican primary ==
Ken Simpler ran unopposed in the primary and automatically became the Republican nominee.

=== Candidates ===
==== Nominee ====
- Ken Simpler, incumbent State Treasurer

== Democratic primary ==
=== Candidates ===
==== Nominee ====
- Colleen Davis, healthcare consultant

== Green primary ==
=== Candidates ===
==== Nominee ====
- David Chandler, Green nominee for State Treasurer in 2014 and for State Senate in 2016

=== Endorsements ===
David Chandler

Organizations

- Green Party

== General election ==
=== Endorsements ===
Ken Simpler (R)

U.S. Representatives

- Mike Castle, former U.S. Representative from Delaware and 69th Governor of Delaware

Organizations

- Correctional Officers Association of Delaware
- Delaware State Chamber
- Delaware State Education Association
- Cape Gazette
- News Journal
Colleen Davis (D)

U.S. Senators

- Tom Carper, U.S. Senator from Delaware
- Chris Coons, U.S. Senator from Delaware

Governors

- John Carney, 74th Governor of Delaware

Political candidates

- Kerri Evelyn Harris, former candidate for U.S. Senate in 2018
- Laura Sturgeon, Democratic nominee for Delaware’s 4th Senate district

Organizations

- Boilermakers Local Lodge 13
- Boilermakers Local Lodge 193
- Bricklayers Local 1
- Carpenters and Joiners of America Local 173
- Cement Masons and Plasterers Local 592
- Democratic Party
- Electricians Local 313
- Elevator Constructors Local 5
- Floorlayers Local 1823
- Glaziers and Glassworkers Local 252
- Heat and Frost Insulators and Allied Workers Local 42
- Ironworkers Local 451
- Laborers International Union of North Americal Local 199
- Millwright and Machinery Erectors Local 1906
- Painters Local 921
- Plasterers and Cement Masons Local 8
- Operating Engineers Local 542
- Plumbers and Pipefitters Local 74
- Plumbers and Pipefitters Local 782
- Road Sprinkler Fitters Local 669
- Roofers and Waterproofers Local 30
- Sheet Metal Workers Local 19
- Stonewall Democrats
- Teamsters Local 326
- United Food and Commercial Workers
David Chandler (G)

Organizations

- Green Party

=== Polling ===
Poll source	Date(s) administered	Sample size	Margin of error	Ken Simpler (R)	Colleen Davis (D)	David Chandler (G)	Undecided
Gravis Marketing	July 24–29, 2018	884	± 3.3%	39%	31%	10%	20%

=== Results ===
Delaware State Treasurer election, 2018
Party	Candidate	Votes	%
Democratic	Colleen Davis	187,240	52.36%
Republican	Ken Simpler (incumbent)	164,001	45.86%
Green	David Chandler	6,301	1.78%
Total votes		357,542	100.00%
Democratic gain from Republican			
