= 2026 Delaware State Auditor election =

- November 3, 2026
Nominee	Lydia York	April Callaway
Party	Democratic	Republican
Popular vote	227,685	130,928
Percentage	60.39%	34.73%
- York: 40–50% 50–60% 60–70% 70–80% 80–90% >90% Callaway: 40–50% 50–60% 60–70% 70–80% 80–90% Tie: 40–50% No votes
State Auditor before election
Lydia York
Democratic
Elected State Auditor
Lydia York
Democratic

The 2026 Delaware State Auditor election was held on November 3, 2026, to elect the State Auditor of Delaware. Primary elections were held on September 15, 2026.

Incumbent Democrat Lydia York, who was elected in 2022 with 54.2% of the vote, won re-election to a second term in office.

== Democratic primary ==
=== Candidates ===
==== Nominee ====
- Lydia York, incumbent state auditor

== Republican primary ==
=== Candidates ===
==== Nominee ====
- April Callaway, insurance administrator

== Third-party candidate ==
=== Nominee ===
- Austin Cassidy (Independent Party), market analyst

== General election ==
=== Results ===
2026 Delaware State Auditor election
Party	Candidate	Votes	%	±%
Democratic	Lydia York (incumbent)	227,685	60.39%	
Republican	April Callaway	130,928	34.73%	
Independent Party	Austin Cassidy	18,380	4.88%	
Total votes		376,993	100.00%	
Democratic hold				
