= Ted Lauzen =

American politician

Treasurer-elect of Delaware
- Assuming office January 2027
- Governor: Matt Meyer
- Succeeding: Colleen Davis

Personal details
- Born: Theodore James Lauzen; June 5, 1985 (age 41) Illinois, U.S.
- Party: Republican (before 2017); Independent (2017–2024); Democratic (2024–present)
- Relatives: Chris Lauzen (father)
- Education: Duke University (BA); University of Pennsylvania (JD, MBA)

Military service
- Branch/service: United States Marine Corps

Theodore "Ted" James Lauzen (born June 5, 1985) is an American politician who is the Treasurer-elect of Delaware. He is a member of the Democratic Party.

== Early life and education ==
Lauzen is the son of Chris Lauzen, a longtime Illinois Republican politician currently serving as Kane County treasurer and previously in the Illinois Senate. He graduated from Marmion Military Academy in Aurora, Illinois in 2003 and from Duke University in 2007.

== Career ==
From 2007 to 2017, Lauzen was a member of the United States Marine Corps and was deployed to Afghanistan as a helicopter pilot. He competed on Team USA as a pentathlete.

Upon returning from active duty, he was an investment banking intern at Goldman Sachs in New York City from March to June 2017 and a founding advisor of 3D-knitting platform Nimbly, LLC in Los Angeles from June 2017 to October 2018.

== Personal life ==
Lauzen stated he registered as a Democrat in 2024, having previously re-registerd as an Independent in 2017 after being a Republican.

Political offices
Preceded by Colleen Davis	Treasurer of Delaware; Taking office 2027	Elect
