= 2012 New Castle County Executive election =

- November 6, 2012

Nominee	Thomas P. Gordon	Mark Blake
Party	Democratic	Republican
Popular vote	148,971	84,014
Percentage	63.94%	36.06%
New Castle County Executive before election
Paul Clark
Democratic
Elected New Castle County Executive
Thomas P. Gordon
Democratic

The 2012 New Castle County Executive election was held on November 6, 2012. Incumbent County Executive Paul Clark, who ascended to the role following former County Executive Chris Coons' election to the U.S. Senate in 2010, ran for election to a full term. However, he was defeated in the Democratic primary by former County Executive Thomas P. Gordon, 46–33 percent. In the general election, Gordon faced medical billing salesman Mark Blake, the Republican nominee. Gordon defeated Blake in a landslide, winning 64 percent of the vote.

== Democratic primary ==
=== Candidates ===
- Thomas P. Gordon, former County Executive
- Paul G. Clark, incumbent County Executive
- Jonathan W. Husband, county government employee
- William F. Shahan, Jr., county government employee

=== Results ===
Democratic primary results
Party	Candidate	Votes	%
Democratic	Thomas P. Gordon	16,314	45.82%
Democratic	Paul G. Clark (incumbent)	11,733	32.95%
Democratic	Jonathan W. Husband	3,841	10.79%
Democratic	William F. Shahan, Jr.	3,717	10.44%
Total votes		35,605	100.00%

== General election ==
=== Candidates ===
- Thomas P. Gordon, former County Executive (Democratic)
- Mark Blake, medical billing salesman, former President of the Greater Hockessin Area Development Association (Republican)

=== Results ===
2012 New Castle County Executive election
Party	Candidate	Votes	%
Democratic	Thomas P. Gordon	148,971	63.94%
Republican	Mark Blake	84,014	36.06%
Total votes		232,985	100.00%
Democratic hold			
