= 2000 New Castle County Executive election =

- November 7, 2000

Nominee	Thomas P. Gordon	Craig Shumaker
Party	Democratic	Green
Popular vote	143,140	23,302
Percentage	86.00%	14.00%
New Castle County Executive before election
Thomas P. Gordon
Democratic
Elected New Castle County Executive
Thomas P. Gordon
Democratic

The 2000 New Castle County Executive election was held on November 7, 2000. Incumbent Democratic County Executive Thomas P. Gordon, who was first elected in 1996, ran for re-election to a second term. He faced no challengers in the primary, and no Republicans ran against him. Gordon's only opponent was Green Party nominee Craig Shumaker, a research engineer. Gordon defeated Shumaker in a landslide, winning his second term with 86 percent of the vote.

== General election ==
=== Candidates ===
- Thomas P. Gordon, incumbent County Executive (Democratic)
- Craig Shumaker, research engineer (Green)

=== Campaign ===
Gordon announced that he would seek a second term as Executive, and initially faced no opponents. Though the local Republican Party planned to field a challenger against him, no Republicans filed by the deadline, leaving Green Party nominee Craig Shumaker as the only candidate. Shumaker said that he ran against Gordon so that he would have an opponent and was forced to spend down his campaign account, noting, "Until I filed, Gordon wasn't going to have to spend it. Now he can spend the next two months helping the local economy." The News Journal endorsed Gordon for re-election, praising him for his "ambitious first term," for "tackl[ing] runaway suburban development," and "ma[king] good on a promise of no property tax increases," while criticizing Shumaker's ideas as "much less coherent and flatly contradictory."

=== Results ===
2000 New Castle County Executive election
Party	Candidate	Votes	%
Democratic	Thomas P. Gordon (inc.)	143,140	86.00%
Green	Craig Shumaker	23,302	14.00%
Total votes		166,442	100.00%
Democratic hold			
