= Kathy McGuiness =

American former politician (born 1967)

Auditor of Delaware
- In office January 1, 2019 – October 19, 2022
- Governor: John Carney
- Preceded by: Tom Wagner
- Succeeded by: Dennis Greenhouse

Personal details
- Born: Kathleen Kramedas McGuiness; February 14, 1967 (age 59) Dover, Delaware, U.S.
- Party: Democratic
- Education: Florida Institute of Technology (BS); Northeastern University (BS)
- Criminal information
- Status: Released
- Convictions: Conflict of interest Overturned: Official misconduct Structuring
- Penalty: 1 year probation, 500 hours of community service, $10,000 fine

Details
- Date apprehended: October 12, 2021

Kathleen Kramedas McGuiness (born February 14, 1967) is an American politician who was the Delaware state auditor, from January 2019 until October 2022. In July 2022, she was found guilty on multiple corruption charges.

On September 13, 2022, McGuiness lost the Democratic primary election to challenger Lydia York in a 42-point landslide. In October 2022, she was sentenced to one year of probation and was given a $10,000 fine for her corruption convictions. Following her sentencing, McGuiness resigned as auditor. She ran to represent the 14th district in the Delaware House of Representatives in 2024 and was endorsed by retiring representative Peter Schwartzkopf, but lost in the primary election to Claire Snyder-Hall after coming in third place.

== Early life and career ==
McGuiness graduated from Cape Henlopen High School in 1985. She earned her bachelor's degree in biology at the Florida Institute of Technology and her bachelor's degree in pharmacy from Northeastern University in Boston. After returning to Delaware, she bought a pharmacy in Rehoboth Beach, Delaware. She sold her pharmacy in 2002 to become a real estate agent.

== Political career ==
McGuiness was elected a city of Rehoboth Beach commissioner in 2000. In 2010, she moved with her family to Park City, Utah, and resigned from the Rehoboth town board in 2012 because she was no longer able to attend the meetings. She moved back to Delaware and was elected to another term as a town commissioner in 2014.

As a member of the Democratic Party, McGuiness ran for lieutenant governor of Delaware in 2016, but she lost the party's nomination in the primary election. She was subsequently appointed to the Delaware State University Board of Trustees by then governor, Jack Markell, and reelected to the town board in 2017.

=== Delaware state auditor ===
In 2018, McGuiness ran for state auditor. She won the Democratic Party nomination, defeating Kathleen Davies and former state representative Dennis E. Williams in the primary election. She defeated Republican James Spadola in the general election to become the first woman elected to the position. She was sworn into office on January 1, 2019, replacing Republican Tom Wagner, who had decided not to seek reelection after serving in the office since 1989.

==== Corruption convictions and resignation ====
On October 11, 2021, McGuiness was indicted on two felony charges and several misdemeanor charges that she paid her daughter and her daughter's friend nearly $30,000 from the state for jobs they did not work, orchestrated no-bid contracts for former campaign consultants while avoiding reporting requirements, and engaged in email surveillance and other intimidation of employees who became aware of her misconduct, among other charges. The next day, she turned herself in and pleaded not guilty to all the charges.

On July 1, 2022, McGuiness was found guilty of conflict of interest, structuring, and official misconduct and not guilty of felony theft and intimidation. She faced up to 1 year in prison, but had a presumptive sentence of probation. On August 31, 2022, the judge overturned McGuiness's structuring conviction but upheld her convictions of conflict of interest and official misconduct. Her request for a new trial was denied.

On October 19, 2022, McGuiness was sentenced to one year of probation and 500 hours of community service and was given a $10,000 fine for conflict of interest and official misconduct. Later that day, she resigned from her position as auditor. Governor John Carney chose Dennis Greenhouse as McGuiness's successor. Greenhouse had previously served as auditor from 1983 to 1989. Her conviction for official misconduct was vacated in February 2024 by the Delaware Supreme Court, which also upheld the misdemeanor conflict of interest conviction, finding that McGuiness had received a "fair trial". Delaware Attorney General Kathy Jennings declined to retry McGuiness on the misconduct charges.

=== 2024 campaign ===
In May 2024, McGuiness announced she was running for the Delaware House of Representatives in the 14th district. She was endorsed by former Delaware House Speaker Peter Schwartzkopf, her longtime friend who has represented the 14th district since 2002 but declined to run for reelection. She lost the election with 26.9% of the vote, coming in third after Marty Rendon with 31.8% and Claire Snyder-Hall with 41.2%.

Political offices
Preceded by Tom Wagner	Auditor of Delaware; 2019–2022	Succeeded by Dennis Greenhouse
