= 2022 Delaware State Treasurer election =

- November 8, 2022
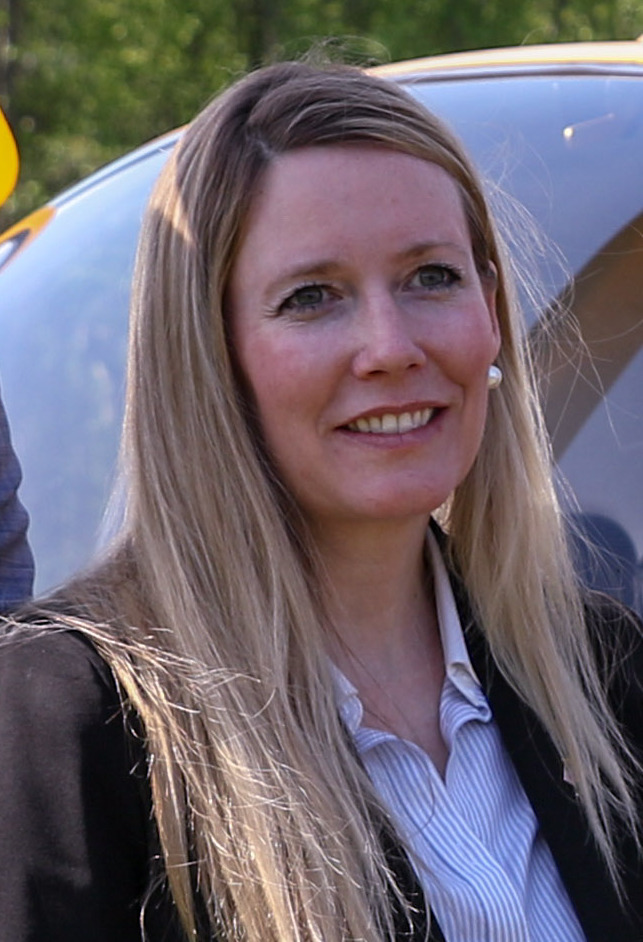

Nominee	Colleen Davis	Greg Coverdale
Party	Democratic	Republican
Popular vote	170,438	147,307
Percentage	53.64%	46.36%
- Davis: 50–60% 60–70% 70–80% 80–90% >90% Coverdale: 50–60% 60–70% 70–80% 80–90% No data
State Treasurer before election
Colleen Davis
Democratic
Elected State Treasurer
Colleen Davis
Democratic

The 2022 Delaware State Treasurer election took place on November 8, 2022, to elect the next Delaware State Treasurer. Incumbent Democratic Party Treasurer Colleen Davis won re-election to a second term.

== Democratic primary ==
=== Candidates ===
==== Nominee ====
- Colleen Davis, incumbent treasurer

== Republican primary ==
=== Candidates ===
==== Nominee ====
- Greg Coverdale, financial counselor

== General election ==
=== Results ===
2022 Delaware State Treasurer election
Party	Candidate	Votes	%	±%
Democratic	Colleen Davis (incumbent)	170,438	53.64%	+1.28%
Republican	Greg Coverdale	147,307	46.36%	+0.50%
Total votes		317,745	100.0%	
Democratic hold				

County	Colleen Davis Democratic		Greg Coverdale Republican	
County	#	%	#	%
New Castle	105,387	63.04%	61,797	36.96%
Kent	25,027	46.71%	28,550	53.29%
Sussex	40,024	41.27%	56,960	58.73%
Totals	170,438	53.64%	147,307	46.36%
