= State auditor =

Executive officer of a U.S. state

Party affiliation of current United States auditors: Democratic Auditor (15 states, 1 district) Republican Auditor (22 states) Non-partisan Auditor (13 states, 5 territories)

State auditors (also known as state comptrollers, state controllers, or state examiners, among others) are fiscal officers lodged in the executive or legislative branches of U.S. state governments who serve as external auditors, internal auditors, program evaluators, financial controllers, bookkeepers, or inspectors general of public funds. The office of state auditor may be a creature of the state constitution or one created by statutory law.

== Selection ==
=== Method ===
The mode of selecting the state auditor varies among the many states and territories. In 24 states, the state auditor is a constitutional officer elected by the voters or the state legislature for specified terms of office. For example, state auditors in California, Idaho, Illinois, Minnesota, Nebraska, Nevada, Pennsylvania, Texas, Utah, and Washington are elected by the voters. Maine and Tennessee are the only states where the state auditor is elected by the legislature. In the remaining states, the state auditor is appointed by and serves at the pleasure of the governor or the relevant state legislature. In those states where the state auditor is appointed by the governor, the appointment is always subject to either legislative nomination or confirmation.

=== Quantity ===
Several states have both an elected auditor serving alongside another auditor that is appointed by and reports exclusively to the legislature. Government auditing arrangements in Minnesota, Utah, and Washington reflect this model. Under such circumstances, the respective jurisdictions of the aforementioned officials is such so that their responsibilities complement one another. In the case of Washington for instance, the state auditor conducts independent audits and investigations of the fiscal condition of local governments and state agencies alike, while the legislative auditor evaluates state agency financial management and performance in support of the legislature's oversight functions. This division of government auditing responsibility is in keeping with two core principles of state and local government auditing in the United States:

1. A state auditor elected by the people is functionally independent from all other public officials and is therefore duly empowered to superintend and verify the condition of public accounts, funds, and resources without fear of reprisal. Barring other constitutional remedies, only the voters can remove and replace an elected state auditor. This institutional independence combats corruption and promotes government accountability directly to the electorate in the spirit of Jacksonian democracy.
2. A legislative auditor subject to the direction and supervision of the state legislature ensures that the legislature, which appropriates funds and establishes program goals in public policy, will ultimately review program expenditures and results. Thus, state government is accountable to the people through their elected representatives.

== Powers and duties ==
=== Typologies ===
Supervising public finances and improving the efficiency and effectiveness of public administration are the primary business of America's state auditors. However, distinctions exist in their functions. Generally speaking, external auditors examine public accounts in order to detect and prevent waste, fraud, and abuse of public funds and resources. These audits may be concerned with rendering an opinion on the basic financial statements of governmental entities, verifying regulatory compliance, assessing the strength and design of internal controls, or evaluating program performance. External auditors operate outside of the statewide accounting and financial reporting framework and do not report to executive branch administrators, meaning they have the relevant independence to objectively verify the condition of public finances. This independence, required by Government Auditing Standards, is guaranteed by either direct election of the voters or by manner of legislative appointment.

While similar, inspectors general are not external auditors. Quite to the contrary, inspectors general operate within the entities that they serve. They cannot independently audit governmental financial statements since they report to the very public administrators that prepare them. Instead, inspectors general serve as an objective assurance and consulting activity to either the duly elected governor or individual state agencies, with a remit specifically tailored to investigating corruption within public office and recommending more efficient business practices in the delivery of public services. For the purpose of brevity, this article focuses only on those inspectors general with a mandate encompassing the whole of state government as opposed to individual state agencies.

Meanwhile, governmental accounting is the province of two different types of accountants – bookkeepers and financial controllers. Once the norm in the United States, bookkeepers are now few in number. Bookkeepers are independently elected constitutional officers whose principal duty is to scrutinize, control, and record the disbursement of public funds paid out of the state treasury. All bookkeepers preaudit claims by and against the state, issue warrants on the treasury in payment of claims approved, administer payroll to state employees, and keep a record of fund balances. Other duties may be assigned to bookkeepers by law, such as the administration of unclaimed property, securities and insurance regulation, or the auditing of local government finances. Meanwhile, financial controllers exist to account for a given state’s financial condition. In these respects, financial controllers are charged with operating the statewide accounting system, approving or processing financial transactions, prescribing and enforcing internal controls, and preparing financial reports, among other related responsibilities. The vast majority of state government accountants are financial controllers; in those states lacking bookkeepers, the responsibilities of that office are instead performed by the pertinent financial controller.

=== Variations on the conceptual models ===
Public organizational theory and state law do not always clearly distinguish the functions of America's state auditors based on their official titles. In fact, the elected financial controllers in Arkansas, Indiana, South Dakota, and Wyoming are designated as "state auditor. Meanwhile, New Jersey's inspector general is named the "state comptroller" and Tennessee's external auditor is constitutionally the "comptroller of the treasury". This etymological discrepancy is the result of the government accounting profession evolving over the course of American history and provides, in part, for many variations on the conceptual models. Some state auditors perform functions altogether unrelated to public-sector accounting or auditing. Of note, New York combines the normally disparate functions of government accounting and government auditing into its elected state comptroller, with the incumbent also managing public pensions and investing state funds. No other state or territory consolidates so much financial power into a single state auditor.

On the other hand, some states constrain the authority of their auditors to specific functions. For example, the bulk of the Alabama state auditor's responsibilities entail inventorying state personal property, with only a limited role for financial audits of the state treasurer's and state comptroller's accounts. South Dakota's state auditor is broadly responsible for preauditing state agency claims and vouchers, issuing warrants on the state treasurer to pay funds out of the treasury, and administering payroll. However, no other functional responsibilities within the government machinery applicable to financial controllership have been assigned to the South Dakota state auditor. Rather, a separate state agency under the direction of the governor maintains the state accounting system, develops and maintains internal controls, and preparing financial reports, in addition to preparing and administering the state budget. Montana's state auditor does not even audit public funds or maintain fiscal control over the state treasury in the traditional sense. Rather, the auditor regulates Montana's securities and insurance industries.

=== Scope of audit authority ===
For the majority of states where the state auditor audits public accounts, their scope of authority encompasses all state agencies. In a plurality of these same states, the auditor's jurisdiction also extends to local governments. Government auditing arrangements are unique in Illinois, Minnesota, New Jersey, and West Virginia however with respect to the fact that their respective state auditors primarily or exclusively audit local governments. In the case of the Illinois comptroller and West Virginia state auditor, these elected state auditors also serve as financial controllers of state agencies. To the contrary, New Jersey's state comptroller functions as an inspector general for the executive branch of state government and is a member of the governor's cabinet. Minnesota is particularly unique. In that state, the state auditor, who is elected, is the only state auditor in the United States to broadly supervise and audit local government finances. In fact, over 4,500 local governments which altogether spend some $56 billion annually come under the state auditor's purview. With that said, the state auditor's authority over state agencies extends only to the statewide single audit of federal programs administered by state agencies and their subrecipients. A separate legislative auditor appointed by and reporting to the state legislature is responsible for audits of state agency financial management and program performance.

=== Miscellaneous responsibilities ===
As independently chosen external auditors, financial controllers and inspectors general, America's state auditors exist to safeguard public finances from misappropriation and maladministration. In short, their work combats corruption and keeps government accountable for the efficient and effective use of tax dollars. Nevertheless, their accounting and auditing activities are frequently put to use for connected purposes. In Colorado for instance, the state auditor reports on the effectiveness of health exchanges and marijuana legalization. Meanwhile, California's state auditor is involved in the redistricting process.

== Professional standards ==
State financial controllers prepare financial statements and keep accounts in accordance with Generally Accepted Accounting Principles issued by the Governmental Accounting Standards Board. Meanwhile, state external auditors and inspectors general exercise their authority in accordance with Government Auditing Standards (GAGAS) promulgated by the comptroller general of the United States, the head of the U.S. Government Accountability Office. Otherwise known as the "Yellow Book", GAGAS prescribes best practice for auditing state agencies and local governments in the United States. In the case of inspectors general, they are also subject to Quality Standards for Inspections and Evaluations prescribed by the Council of the Inspectors General on Integrity and Efficiency, an independent committee created by an Act of Congress consisting of the U.S. government's many inspectors general.

== Professional affiliations ==
State external auditors and financial controllers in the United States - whether elected or appointed - are organized nationally as the National State Auditors' Association and the National Association of State Comptrollers. Both secretariats are housed within the National Association of State Auditors, Comptrollers and Treasurers. State inspectors general belong to the Association of Inspectors General.

== Tables of America's state auditors ==
=== Elected state auditors in the United States ===
Incumbent	State	Party	Assumed office	Title	Mode of election	Type of state auditor	Scope of accounting function	Scope of audit authority, noting primary and secondary jurisdiction	Other responsibilities	Website
Andrew Sorrell	Alabama	Republican	January 16, 2023	State Auditor	Elected by voters	External auditor	Inventories state personal property	Accounts of State Treasurer and Department of Finance	Sits on state boards that appoint county election officials, approve claims against the state, and compromise or settle tax appeals	Alabama Office of the State Auditor
Dennis Milligan	Arkansas	Republican	January 10, 2023	Auditor of State	Elected by voters	Bookkeeper	Claims auditor, fund accountant, and payroll officer of state government	Not applicable	Administers unclaimed property	Arkansas Office of the Auditor of State
Malia Cohen	California	Democratic	January 2, 2023	State Controller	Elected by voters	Financial controller	General accountant, claims auditor, internal auditor, and payroll officer of state government	Local governments	Administers unclaimed property, collects property taxes, and is a voting member of the Board of Equalization, State Lands Commission, State Teacher's Retirement System, and the Public Employees' Retirement System, among 70 boards and commissions	California Office of the State Controller
Sean Scanlon	Connecticut	Democratic	January 4, 2023	State Comptroller	Elected by voters	Financial controller	General accountant, claims auditor, and payroll officer of state government	Not applicable	Administers public pensions	Connecticut Office of the State Comptroller
Lydia York	Delaware	Democratic	January 3, 2023	Auditor of Accounts	Elected by voters	External auditor	Not applicable	State agencies and local governments	Attests to the election returns certified by the commissioner of elections and serves as member of the Insurance Coverage Determination Committee	Delaware Office of the Auditor of Accounts
Blaise Ingoglia	Florida	Republican	July 21, 2025	Chief Financial Officer	Elected by voters	Financial controller	General accountant, claims auditor, and payroll officer of state government	Prescribes standards for auditing local governments and reviews localities' annual financial reports	Ex officio state treasurer and state fire marshal; also administers unclaimed property and regulates deathcare and insurance industries	Florida Department of Financial Services
Benjamin Cruz	Guam	Nonpartisan	September 13, 2018	Public Auditor	Elected by voters	External auditor	Not applicable	Whole of territorial government, including localities	Administers a government ethics training program and publishes meeting agendas and approved minutes of territorial agencies, boards, commissions, and public corporations	Ufisinan I Kuinentan Pupbliku
Brandon Woolf	Idaho	Republican	October 15, 2012	State Controller	Elected by voters	Financial controller	General accountant, claims auditor, and payroll officer of state government	Not applicable	Provides information technology services to state agencies	Idaho State Controller's Office
Susana Mendoza	Illinois	Democratic	December 5, 2016	Comptroller	Elected by voters	Financial controller	General accountant, claims auditor, and payroll officer of state government	Local governments	Administers public cemetery funds and reports on the state's debt	Office of the Illinois Comptroller
Elise Nieshalla	Indiana	Republican	December 1, 2023	Auditor of State	Elected by voters	Financial controller	General accountant, claims auditor, and payroll officer of state government	Not applicable	Collects and distributes property taxes to local governments and reviews local governments' budget documents	Indiana Office of the Auditor of State
Rob Sand	Iowa	Democratic	January 2, 2019	Auditor of State	Elected by voters	External auditor	Not applicable	State agencies and local governments	Member of various boards, councils, and commissions, including the Executive Council	Iowa Office of the Auditor of State
Allison Ball	Kentucky	Republican	January 1, 2024	Auditor of Public Accounts	Elected by voters	External auditor	Not applicable	State agencies and local governments	Administers a scholarship program for economically disadvantaged accounting students pursuing courses of study at Kentucky institutions of higher education	Office of the Auditor of Public Accounts of the Commonwealth of Kentucky
Matthew Dunlap	Maine	Democratic	January 4, 2021	State Auditor	Elected by Legislature	External auditor	Not applicable	State agencies and local governments	Administers the finances of Maine's Unorganized Territory (the northern third of the state)	Maine Office of the State Auditor
Brooke Lierman	Maryland	Democratic	January 16, 2023	Comptroller	Elected by voters	Financial controller	General accountant, claims auditor, and payroll officer of state government	Not applicable	Collects state taxes, administers unclaimed property, and supervises the issuance of business licenses	Office of the Maryland Comptroller
Diana DiZoglio	Massachusetts	Democratic	January 18, 2023	State Auditor	Elected by voters	External auditor	Not applicable	State agencies	Determines if state laws impose unfunded mandates on local governments, monitors municipal budgets, and studies issues pertinent to local government finances	Office of the Massachusetts State Auditor
Julie Blaha	Minnesota	Democratic–Farmer–Labor	January 7, 2019	State Auditor	Elected by voters	External auditor	Not applicable	Local governments, plus state agencies that receive federal awards	Certifies state property tax levy and sits on boards that oversee public pensions, public records, state investments, and state lands	Office of the Minnesota State Auditor
Shad White	Mississippi	Republican	July 16, 2018	State Auditor	Elected by voters	External auditor	Not applicable	Local governments and state agencies	Prescribes system for preaudits of disbursements	Mississippi Office of the State Auditor
Scott Fitzpatrick	Missouri	Republican	January 9, 2023	State Auditor	Elected by voters	External auditor	Not applicable	State agencies and local governments	Prescribes uniform systems of accounting for all public entities	Office of the Missouri State Auditor
James Brown	Montana	Republican	January 6, 2025	State Auditor	Elected by voters	Securities and insurance regulator	Not applicable	Investment firms and insurance companies	Member of the State Land Board	Office of the Montana State Auditor, Commissioner of Securities and Insurance
Mike Foley	Nebraska	Republican	January 5, 2023	Auditor of Public Accounts	Elected by voters	External auditor	Not applicable	State agencies and local governments	Member of Board of State Canvassers and State Records Board	Office of the Nebraska Auditor of Public Accounts
Andy Matthews	Nevada	Republican	January 2, 2023	State Controller	Elected by voters	Financial controller	General accountant, claims auditor, debt collector, and payroll officer of state government	Fraud in state government	Member of the Board of Finance, Executive Branch Audit Committee, and Transportation Department Board of Directors	Nevada State Controller's Office
Joe Maestas	New Mexico	Democratic	January 1, 2023	State Auditor	Elected by voters	External auditor	Not applicable	Local governments and state agencies	Member of the State Commission of Public Records and Archives	State Auditor's Office of New Mexico
Tom DiNapoli	New York	Democratic	February 7, 2007	State Comptroller	Elected by voters	Financial controller	General accountant, claims auditor, and payroll officer of state government	State agencies and local governments	Administers unclaimed property, invests state funds, and manages public pensions	New York Department of Audit and Control
Dave Boliek	North Carolina	Republican	January 1, 2025	State Auditor	Elected by voters	External auditor	Not applicable	State agencies, plus any local government when directed by the Local Government Commission	Member of Council of State and Local Government Commission	North Carolina Office of the State Auditor
Josh Gallion	North Dakota	Republican	January 1, 2017	State Auditor	Elected by voters	External auditor	Not applicable	State agencies and local governments	Conducts compliance reviews and audits of federal royalty payments from oil, gas, and coal leases.	North Dakota Office of the State Auditor
Keith Faber	Ohio	Republican	January 12, 2019	Auditor of State	Elected by voters	External auditor	Not applicable	Local governments and state agencies	Enforces open meeting and public records laws	Office of the Ohio Auditor of State
Cindy Byrd	Oklahoma	Republican	January 14, 2019	State Auditor and Inspector	Elected by voters	External auditor	Not applicable	State agencies and local governments	Member of Commissioners of the Land Office	Office of the Oklahoma State Auditor and Inspector
Tobias Read	Oregon	Democratic	January 6, 2025	Secretary of State	Elected by voters	External auditor	Not applicable	State agencies and state-supported programs delivered by local governments; also performs work paper reviews of local government audits	Registers businesses, manages the state archives, and administers elections	Audit Division, Office of the Oregon Secretary of State
Tim DeFoor	Pennsylvania	Republican	January 19, 2021	Auditor General	Elected by voters	External auditor	Not applicable	State agencies and local governments	Audits corporate tax returns	Pennsylvania Department of the Auditor General
Brian Gaines	South Carolina	Democratic	May 12, 2023	Comptroller General	Elected by voters	Financial controller	General accountant, claims auditor, and payroll officer of state government	Not applicable	Member of the State Fiscal Accountability Authority	Office of the Comptroller General of South Carolina
Rich Sattgast	South Dakota	Republican	January 5, 2019	State Auditor	Elected by voters	Bookkeeper	Claims auditor, fund accountant, and payroll officer for state government	Not applicable	Member of the State Board of Finance	South Dakota Office of the State Auditor
Jason Mumpower	Tennessee	Republican	January 13, 2021	Comptroller of the Treasury	Elected by Legislature	External auditor	Not applicable	Local governments and state agencies	Issues and manages state and local government debt	Office of the Tennessee Comptroller of the Treasury
Don Huffines; Acting	Texas	Republican	August 1, 2026	Comptroller of Public Accounts	Elected by voters	Financial controller	General accountant, claims auditor, and payroll officer of state government	Not applicable	Collects state and local taxes, procures goods and services for state agencies, and serves as state treasurer	Office of the Texas Comptroller of Public Accounts
Tina Cannon	Utah	Republican	January 6, 2025	State Auditor	Elected by voters	External auditor	Not applicable	State agencies and local governments	Enforces state's data privacy law	Utah Office of the State Auditor
Doug Hoffer	Vermont	Democratic	January 10, 2013	Auditor of Accounts	Elected by voters	External auditor	Not applicable	State agencies	Publishes an internal control checklist for local government funds	Office of the Vermont Auditor of Accounts
Pat McCarthy	Washington	Democratic	January 11, 2017	State Auditor	Elected by voters	External auditor	Not applicable	Local governments and state agencies	Enforces open meetings, public records, and whistleblower protection laws	Office of the Washington State Auditor
Mark Hunt	West Virginia	Republican	January 13, 2025	State Auditor	Elected by voters	Bookkeeper	Claims auditor, fund accountant, and payroll officer of state government	Local governments, plus fraud throughout the public sector	Regulates securities industry and administers tax-delinquent property	West Virginia State Auditor's Office
Kristi Racines	Wyoming	Republican	January 7, 2019	State Auditor	Elected by voters	Financial controller	General accountant, claims auditor, and payroll officer of state government	Not applicable	Member of State Board of Land Commissioners and State Loan and Investment Board	Wyoming State Auditor's Office

=== Appointed state auditors in the United States ===
Incumbent	State	Party	Assumed office	Title	Mode of appointment	Type of state auditor	Scope of accounting function	Scope of audit authority, noting primary and secondary jurisdiction	Other responsibilities	Website
Rachel Riddle	Alabama	Nonpartisan	January 2011	Chief Examiner of Public Accounts	Appointed by Legislative Committee on Public Accounts	External auditor	Not applicable	Local governments and state agencies	Prescribes uniform systems of accounting for all public offices	Alabama Department of Examiners of Public Accounts
Kathleen Baxter	Alabama	Nonpartisan	January 2017	Comptroller	Appointed by Director of Finance from civil service, with Governor's approval	Financial controller	General accountant, claims auditor, and payroll officer of state government	Not applicable	Settles with county tax collectors for fines, fees, and forfeitures due the state	Alabama State Comptroller's Office
Kris Curtis	Alaska	Nonpartisan	January 2012	Legislative Auditor	Appointed by Legislature	External auditor	Not applicable	State agencies, cities, and organized boroughs		Alaska Division of Legislative Audit
Mike Edmonds	American Samoa	Nonpartisan	October 5, 2023	Public Auditor	Appointed by Governor with legislative advice and consent	External auditor	Not applicable	Whole of territorial government, including localities		American Samoa Government Territorial Audit Office
Lindsey Perry	Arizona	Nonpartisan	April 18, 2018	Auditor General	Appointed by Legislature	External auditor	Not applicable	State agencies and local governments		Arizona Office of the Auditor General
Kevin White	Arkansas	Nonpartisan	July 1, 2024	Legislative Auditor	Appointed by Legislature	External auditor	Not applicable	State agencies and local governments		Arkansas Legislative Audit Office
Grant Parks	California	Nonpartisan	January 16, 2023	State Auditor	Appointed by Governor from slate of candidates nominated by Joint Legislative Audit Committee	External auditor	Not applicable	State agencies and local governments	Administers California's Whistleblower Protection Act	California Office of the State Auditor
Kerri Hunter	Colorado	Nonpartisan	July 1, 2021	State Auditor	Appointed by Legislature	External auditor	Not applicable	State agencies and local governments		Colorado Office of the State Auditor
Kathy Patterson	District of Columbia	Democratic	January 2, 2015	Auditor	Appointed by D.C. Council	External auditor	Not applicable	Legislative, executive, and judicial branches of D.C. government		Office of the Auditor for the District of Columbia
Sherrill Norman	Florida	Republican	July 1, 2015	Auditor General	Appointed by Legislature	External auditor	Not applicable	State agencies		Florida Auditor General
Greg Griffin	Georgia	Nonpartisan	July 1, 2012	State Auditor	Appointed by Legislature	External auditor	Not applicable	State agencies, local governments, and nonprofit organizations	Provides fiscal estimates of legislation and actuarial reviews of pensions for Legislature	Georgia Department of Audits and Accounts
Les Kondo	Hawaii	Nonpartisan	May 1, 2016	State Auditor	Appointed by Legislature	External auditor	Not applicable	State agencies and local governments		Hawai'i Office of the Auditor
April Renfro	Idaho	Nonpartisan	March 2012	Legislative Auditor	Appointed by Legislature	External auditor	Not applicable	State agencies and local governments		Idaho Legislative Audits Division
Frank Mautino	Illinois	Democratic	January 1, 2016	Auditor General	Appointed by Legislature	External auditor	Not applicable	State agencies		Illinois Office of the Auditor General
Paul Joyce	Indiana	Nonpartisan	March 2014	State Examiner	Appointed by Governor with legislative advice and consent	External auditor	Not applicable	State agencies and local governments		Indiana State Board of Accounts
Chris Clarke	Kansas	Nonpartisan	December 2021	Legislative Auditor	Appointed by Legislature	External auditor	Not applicable	State agencies		Kansas Legislative Division of Post Audit
Mike Waguespack	Louisiana	Nonpartisan	April 19, 2021	Legislative Auditor	Appointed by Legislature	External auditor	Not applicable	State agencies and local governments		Office of the Louisiana Legislative Auditor
Brian Tanen	Maryland	Nonpartisan	July 2024	Legislative Auditor	Appointed by Legislature	External auditor	Not applicable	State agencies		Maryland Office of Legislative Audits
Doug Ringler	Michigan	Nonpartisan	June 9, 2014	Auditor General	Appointed by Legislature	External auditor	Not applicable	State agencies		Michigan Office of the Auditor General
Judy Randall	Minnesota	Nonpartisan	November 9, 2021	Legislative Auditor	Appointed by Legislature	External auditor	Not applicable	State agencies		Minnesota Office of the Legislative Auditor
Michael Kane	New Hampshire	Nonpartisan	September 2015	Legislative Budget Assistant	Appointed by Legislature	External auditor	Not applicable	State agencies	Prepares fiscal estimates of legislation and assists General Court in the development of the budget bill	Office of Legislative Budget Assistant, General Court of New Hampshire
David Kaschak	New Jersey	Nonpartisan	February 23, 2021	State Auditor	Appointed by Legislature	External auditor	Not applicable	State agencies and state-supported entities		Office of the New Jersey State Auditor
Kevin Walsh	New Jersey	Nonpartisan	January 27, 2020	State Comptroller	Appointed by Governor with Senate advice and consent	Inspector general	Not applicable	Local governments and state agencies		Office of the New Jersey State Comptroller
Dora Deleon Guerrero	Northern Mariana Islands	Nonpartisan	July 2022	Public Auditor	Appointed by Governor with legislative advice and consent	External auditor	Not applicable	Whole of territorial government, including localities		Office of the Public Auditor for the Northern Mariana Islands
Carmen Vega Fournier	Puerto Rico	New Progressive Party	September 2025	Comptroller	Appointed by Governor with advice and consent of both houses of Legislature	External auditor	Not applicable	Whole of territorial government, including localities		Oficina Puertorriqueño del Contralor
David Bergantino	Rhode Island	Nonpartisan	January 6, 2023	Auditor General	Appointed by Legislature	External auditor	Not applicable	State agencies		Office of the Rhode Island Auditor General
Delia Thomas	U.S. Virgin Islands	Nonpartisan	September 2022	Inspector General	Appointed by Governor with legislative advice and consent	Inspector general	Not applicable	Whole of territorial government, including localities		Office of the Virgin Islands Inspector General
Staci Henshaw	Virginia	Nonpartisan	January 1, 2021	Auditor of Public Accounts	Appointed by Legislature	External auditor	Not applicable	State agencies and local governments		Virginia Office of the Auditor of Public Accounts
K.D. Chapman-See	Washington	Democratic	January 2025	Director of Financial Management	Appointed by Governor with Senate advice and consent	Financial controller	General accountant, claims auditor, and payroll officer of state government	Not applicable	Administers state's budget, facilities management, human resources, and IT functions	Washington Office of Financial Management
Eric Thomas	Washington	Nonpartisan	January 2023	Legislative Auditor	Appointed by Joint Legislative Audit and Review Committee	External auditor	Not applicable	Performance audits of state agencies	Conducts sunset reviews of state programs	Washington Joint Legislative Audit and Review Committee
Melody Duke	West Virginia	Nonpartisan	March 17, 2025	Director of Finance	Appointed by Secretary of Administration - a gubernatorial appointee - from the civil service	Financial controller	General accountant	Not applicable	Registers state vendors and provides financial management, accounting, and payroll services to the other divisions of the Department of Administration	Finance Division, West Virginia Department of Administration
Justin Robinson	West Virginia	Nonpartisan		Legislative Auditor	Appointed by Joint Committee on Government and Finance	External auditor	Not applicable	Financial and performance audits of agencies	Directs and supervises all legislative service agencies in ex officio capacity as "Legislative Manager", including the Budget, Legislative Services, Post Audit, and PERD divisions, among others	West Virginia Legislative Auditor's Office
Kathy Blumenfeld	Wisconsin	Democratic	January 2022	Secretary of Administration	Appointed by Governor with Senate advice and consent	Financial controller	General accountant, claims auditor, and payroll officer of state government	Not applicable	Administers state's budget, facilities management, human resources, IT, procurement, and treasury management functions	Executive Budget and Finance Division, Wisconsin Department of Administration
Joe Chrisman	Wisconsin	Nonpartisan	June 17, 2011	State Auditor	Appointed by Joint Committee on Legislative Organization from candidates nominated by Joint Legislative Audit Committee	External auditor	Not applicable	State agencies	Conducts best practices reviews of public services delivered by local governments	Wisconsin Legislative Audit Bureau
Richard Cummings	Wyoming	Nonpartisan		Administrator of the Public Funds Division	Appointed by Commissioner of Audit - a gubernatorial appointee - from civil service	External auditor	Not applicable	State agencies and local governments	Regulates financial institutions and collects state excise taxes	Public Funds Division, Wyoming Department of Audit

== See also ==
- State constitutional officer
- Governor (United States)
- Lieutenant governor (United States)
- State attorney general
- State treasurer
- Secretary of state (U.S. state government)
- List of U.S. statewide elected officials
