= 2020 New Castle County Executive election =

2020 Delaware election

- November 3, 2020
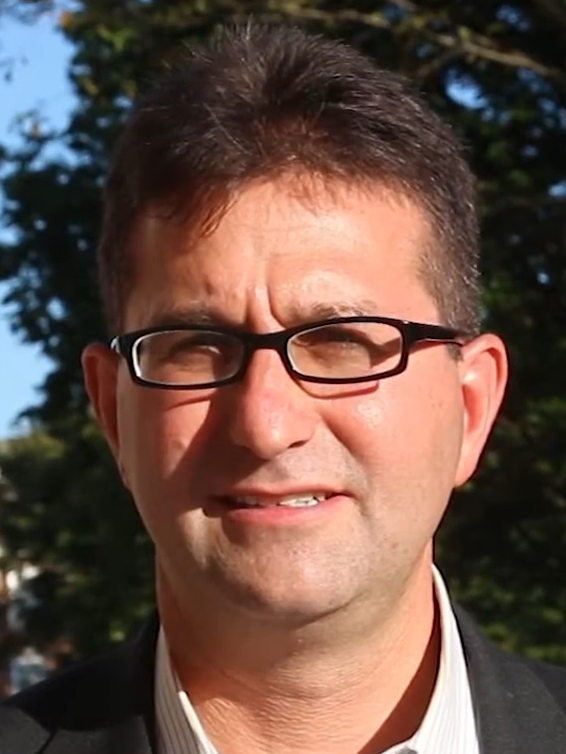
Nominee	Matt Meyer
Party	Democratic
Popular vote	209,480
Percentage	99.2%
County Executive before election
Matt Meyer
Democratic
Elected County Executive
Matt Meyer
Democratic

The 2020 New Castle County Executive election was held on Tuesday, November 3, 2020, to elect the County Executive of New Castle County, Delaware. Incumbent Democratic County Executive Matt Meyer won re-election to a second term. Matt Meyer first won election in 2016 with 66.6% of the vote.

Incumbent County Executive Matt Meyer and New Castle County Vo-Tech district staff member Maggie Jones ran for the Democratic nomination. On September 15, 2020, Meyer defeated Jones by a 13-point margin.

== Democratic primary ==
=== Candidates ===
==== Nominee ====
- Matt Meyer, incumbent New Castle County Executive

==== Eliminated in primary ====
- Maggie Jones, Vo-Tech district staff member

=== Results ===
Democratic primary results
Party	Candidate	Votes	%
Democratic	Matt Meyer (incumbent)	43,833	56.5%
Democratic	Maggie Jones	33,735	43.5%
Total votes		77,568	100%

== General election results ==
2020 New Castle County Executive election
Party	Candidate	Votes	%	±%
Democratic	Matt Meyer (incumbent)	209,480	99.16%	+32.57%
Write-In	Mike Stewart	1,770	0.84%	+0.84%
Total votes		211,250	100.00%	
Democratic hold				
