= 2010 Delaware elections =

- November 2, 2010

Elections were held in Delaware on Tuesday, November 2, 2010. Primary elections were held on September 14, 2010.

== Federal ==
=== Senate ===
The 2010 election for the United States Senate was an open seat special election to finish the term ending in January 2015. Joe Biden, the 36-year senator from the seat, was reelected to his Senate seat in 2008 and was simultaneously elected vice president of the United States. He resigned on January 16, 2009, in order to take his seat as vice president (he was sworn in five days later, on January 20, Inauguration Day). Delaware Governor Ruth Ann Minner announced her intention to appoint Biden's longtime aide and chief of staff Edward E. "Ted" Kaufman on November 24, 2008, and made the appointment the same day Biden resigned. Kaufman was sworn in as a senator the next day. He made clear that he would not be a candidate for election in 2010.

Biden's son Beau Biden, the state attorney general, considered entering the race but decided not to. Democrat Chris Coons, the county executive of New Castle County, entered the race instead and won the Democratic nomination unopposed. In a widely publicized Republican primary, Michael Castle, the former governor and nine-term U.S. representative for Delaware's sole congressional seat who was initially heavily favored to win the primary and then the general election, was defeated in an upset by Tea Party movement-aligned marketing consultant Christine O'Donnell. Coons went on to defeat O'Donnell, as well as minor-party candidates Glenn A. Miller (Independent Party of Delaware) and James W. Rash (Libertarian), by a wide margin.

2010 election, U.S. senator for Delaware
Party	Candidate	Votes	%	±%
Democratic	Chris Coons	174,012	56.6	
Republican	Christine O'Donnell	123,053	40	
Independent Party	Glenn A. Miller	8,201	2.7	
Libertarian	James W. Rash	2,101	0.7	

=== House of Representatives ===
John Carney was elected to Delaware's sole seat in the House of Representatives, replacing Republican Mike Castle, who vacated his seat to unsuccessfully run for the Senate. This was one of just three House seats to be picked up by the Democrats; the others were Cedric Richmond in Louisiana's 2nd congressional district and Colleen Hanabusa in Hawaii's 1st congressional district.

2010 election, Delaware's at-large congressional district
Party	Candidate	Votes	%	±%
Democratic	John Carney	173,543	56.8	
Republican	Glen Urquhart	125,442	41	
Independent Party	Earl R. Lofland	3,704	1.2	
Libertarian	Brent A. Wangen	1,986	0.6	
Blue Enigma	Jeffrey Brown	961	0.4	

== State ==
=== Constitutional officers ===
==== Attorney General ====
2010 Delaware Attorney General election
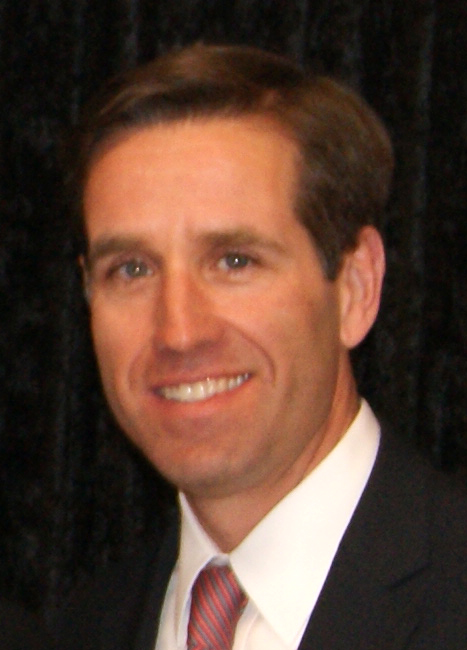

Nominee	Beau Biden	Doug Camp
Party	Democratic	Independent Party
Popular vote	203,931	54,503
Percentage	78.9%	21.1%
- Biden: 60–70% 70–80% 80–90% >90%
Attorney General before election
Beau Biden
Democratic
Elected Attorney General
Beau Biden
Democratic

Joseph Robinette "Beau" Biden III, son of Vice President Joseph Robinette "Joe" Biden, Jr., cruised to reelection as Delaware attorney general with no major-party opposition and a commanding 58-point margin of victory. Beau Biden had considered running in the special Senate election held simultaneously with the general election to serve the balance of his father's unexpired Senate term. (His father resigned to become vice president.) However, Beau chose to run for reelection as attorney general instead.

2010 election, Delaware attorney general
Party	Candidate	Votes	%	±%
Democratic	Beau Biden	203,931	78.9	
Independent Party	Doug Camp	54,503	21.1	

==== Treasurer ====
2010 Delaware State Treasurer election
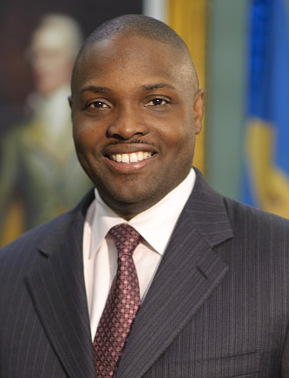

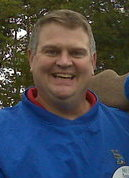
Nominee	Chipman Flowers Jr.	Colin Bonini
Party	Democratic	Republican
Popular vote	153,203	147,031
Percentage	51.0%	48.9%
- Flowers: 50–60% 60–70% 70–80% 80–90% Bonini: 50–60% 60–70% 70–80%
Treasurer before election
Velda Jones-Potter
Democratic
Elected Treasurer
Chipman Flowers Jr.
Democratic

In this race, Democrat Chipman "Chip" Flowers Jr., a 35-year-old attorney from Middletown, narrowly edging out Republican Colin R. J. Bonini of Magnolia, a 45-year-old state senator representing District 16. Flowers replaced Velda Jones-Potter, the incumbent treasurer appointed by Governor Jack Markell to finish out his term as treasurer when he was elected to the governorship in the 2008 election. Jones-Potter ran for the Democratic nomination, but was defeated by Flowers in the primary. Flowers became Delaware's first African American elected to statewide office. Bonini remained a state senator until 2010.

2010 election, Delaware State Treasurer
Party	Candidate	Votes	%	±%
Democratic	Chip Flowers, Jr.	153,203	51	
Republican	Colin R. J. Bonini	147,031	49	

==== Auditor of Accounts ====
2010 Delaware State Auditor election
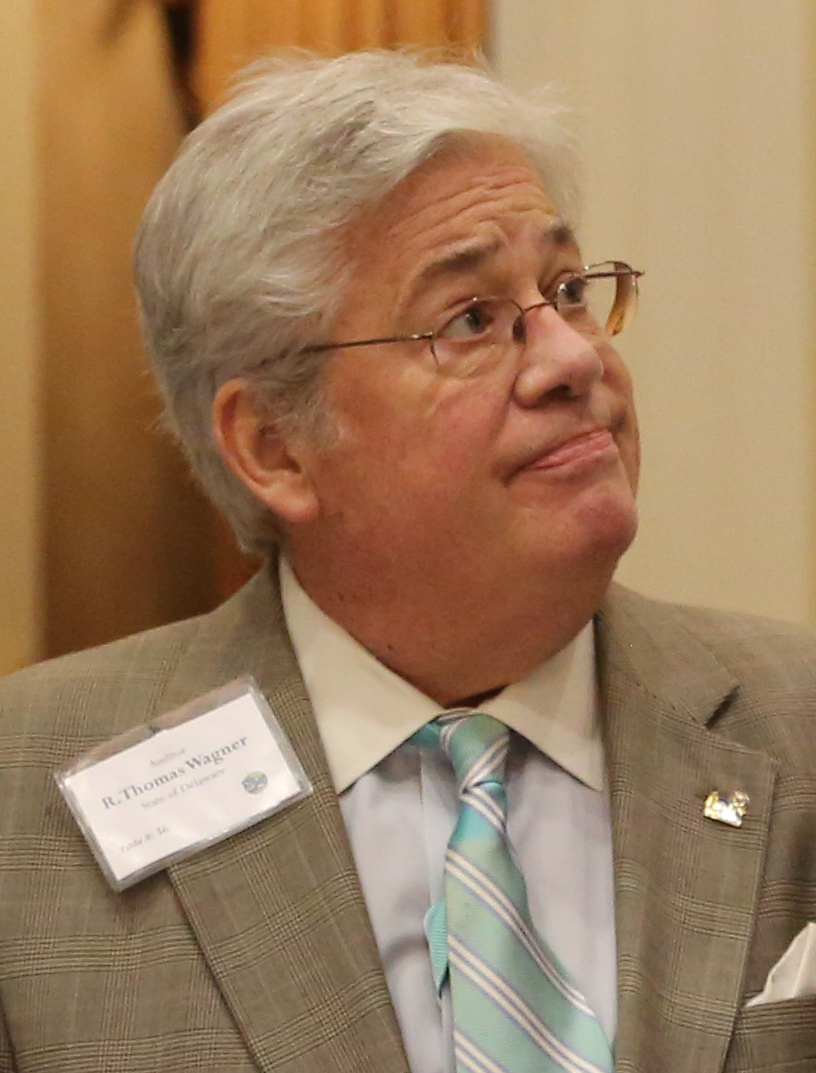

Nominee	Tom Wagner	Richard Korn
Party	Republican	Democratic
Popular vote	150,156	147,593
Percentage	50.4%	49.6%
- Wagner: 50–60% 60–70% 70–80% Korn: 50–60% 60–70% 70–80% 80–90%
Auditor before election
Tom Wagner
Republican
Elected Auditor
Tom Wagner
Republican

In this race, longtime State Auditor R. Thomas "Tom" Wagner Jr. of Dover, the Republican nominee and 21-year incumbent, won a sixth term in office by just 2,563 votes (0.8 percent) over Democratic nominee Richard Korn of Wilmington, the president and CEO of Franklin Strategies, a political consulting firm. This was the closest statewide race in Delaware in the 2010 general elections.

2010 election, Delaware Auditor of Accounts
Party	Candidate	Votes	%	±%
Republican	R. Thomas Wagner Jr.	150,156	50.4	
Democratic	Richard Korn	147,593	49.6	

=== General Assembly ===
==== Senate ====
Half of the seats of the Delaware Senate were up for election in 2010.

==== House of Representatives ====
All of the seats in the Delaware House of Representatives were up for election in 2010.

== Local ==
=== Sheriffs ===
The countywide position of sheriff was up for election in all of Delaware's three counties.

In heavily Democratic New Castle County, Democratic nominee Trinidad Navarro, 40, a senior corporal and chief media spokesman with the New Castle County Police, won by a very wide margin, defeating Republican William Hart, a commercial construction project manager and Independence Party of Delaware candidate Joseph O'Leary. In the Democratic primaries, Navarro routed 30-year incumbent Sheriff Mike Walsh, 72, with 63.3 percent of the vote. In the Republican primary, Hart defeated O'Leary, 14,377 to 11,105, but O'Leary chose to run as an Independence Party candidate.

2010 election, sheriff of New Castle County
Party	Candidate	Votes	%	±%
Democratic	Trinidad Navarro	125,133	68.8	
Republican	William Hart	48,437	26.6	
Independent Party	Joseph O'Leary	8,414	4.6	

In Sussex County, Republican Jeffrey Scott Christopher, 46, of Greenwood, a former Sussex County sheriff's chief deputy, won with 53.8 percent of the vote, defeating incumbent Democrat Eric D. Swanson, 56, of Lewes, who had been sheriff since 2007 and, before that, a Delaware State Policeman.

2010 election, sheriff of Sussex County
Party	Candidate	Votes	%	±%
Republican	Jeffrey S. Christopher	36,900	53.8	
Democratic	Eric D. Swanson	31,635	46.2	

In Kent County, Democrat Norman Wood of Camden, a Smyrna Police Department lieutenant, defeated Republican incumbent Sheriff James A. Higdon Jr. of Dover. Higdon pleaded guilty in July 2010 to driving under the influence on May 29, 2010. First elected in 1994, he won reelection three more times, in 1998, 2002, and 2006, and only in 1998 had an opponent.

2010 election, sheriff of Kent County
Party	Candidate	Votes	%	±%
Democratic	Norman Wood	25,136	52	
Republican	James Higdon Jr.	20,010	41.4	
Independent Party	Christopher Tallman	3,188	6.6	
