= Mike Waguespack =

Michael J. Waguespack is an American politician who is currently serving as the Louisiana Legislative Auditor. He is a graduate of Louisiana State University.

Waguespack was elected by a supermajority vote of the Louisiana State Legislature on April 19, 2021, with no dissentions. He previously served as the sheriff of Assumption Parish until he was defeated in a runoff election in 2016.

The Legislative Auditor's Office is responsible for reviews of more than 3,500 state and local governments, agencies, boards, programs, and commissions. As a result of the City of New Orleans experiencing a fiscal crisis, Waguespack has been supervising the bond funds used to pay city workers.
