= Dennis Greenhouse =

American politician

Auditor of Delaware
- In office October 20, 2022 – January 3, 2023
- Governor: John Carney
- Preceded by: Kathy McGuiness
- Succeeded by: Lydia York
- In office January 1983 – January 20, 1989
- Governor: Pete du Pont; Mike Castle
- Preceded by: Richard Collins
- Succeeded by: Tom Wagner

County Executive of New Castle County
- In office January 20, 1989 – January 8, 1997
- Preceded by: Rita Justice
- Succeeded by: Thomas P. Gordon

Personal details
- Born: Dennis Edward Greenhouse; January 17, 1950 (age 76) Wilmington, Delaware, U.S.
- Party: Democratic
- Education: Fairleigh Dickinson University (BA)

Dennis Edward Greenhouse is an American politician who served as the Delaware Auditor of Accounts from 1983 to 1989, and again in 2022 to 2023. He has also served as the New Castle County Executive from 1989 to 1996. Greenhouse is a member of the Democratic Party.

== Career ==
Greenhouse, a Democrat, was first elected as the Delaware Auditor of Accounts in 1982, narrowly defeating Republican Thomas W. Spruance. He was re-elected in 1986, defeating future Auditor Tom Wagner.

Greenhouse resigned his position as Auditor in 1989 to become the New Castle County Executive, after winning election to that position in 1988. He was re-elected to his position as New Castle County Executive uncontested in 1992.

Greenhouse was appointed as the Delaware Auditor of Accounts in 2022 by Delaware governor John Carney, following the resignation of Democratic incumbent Kathy McGuiness. He did not run for election to a full term in 2022, and was succeeded by Democrat Lydia York. Greenhouse served on York's transition team as she took over the office.

== Electoral history ==
1982 Delaware State Auditor election
Party	Candidate	Votes	%
Democratic	Dennis Greenhouse	92,134	50.48%
Republican	Thomas Spruance	87,640	48.02%
American	Kevin Vanderheyden	929	0.51%
Libertarian	David Crane	915	0.50%
Citizens	Carol Loewenstein	902	0.49%
Total votes		182,520	100%
Democratic gain from Republican			

1986 Delaware State Auditor election
Party	Candidate	Votes	%
Democratic	Dennis Greenhouse (incumbent)	84,924	54.60%
Republican	Tom Wagner	69,640	44.77%
American	Karel Vanderheyden	988	00.63%
Total votes		155,552	100%
Democratic hold			

1988 New Castle County Executive election
Party	Candidate	Votes	%
Democratic	Dennis Greenhouse	121,452	73.75%
Republican	Rita Justice (incumbent)	43,239	26.25%
Total votes		164,691	100%
Democratic gain from Republican			

1992 New Castle County Executive election
Party	Candidate	Votes	%
Democratic	Dennis Greenhouse (incumbent)	128,769	100.00%
Total votes		128,769	100%
Democratic hold			

Political offices
Preceded by Richard Collins	Auditor of Delaware; 1983–1989	Succeeded by Tom Wagner
Preceded by Kathy McGuiness	Auditor of Delaware; 2022–2023	Succeeded by Lydia York
