= 2016 New Castle County Executive election =

2016 Delaware election

- November 8, 2016
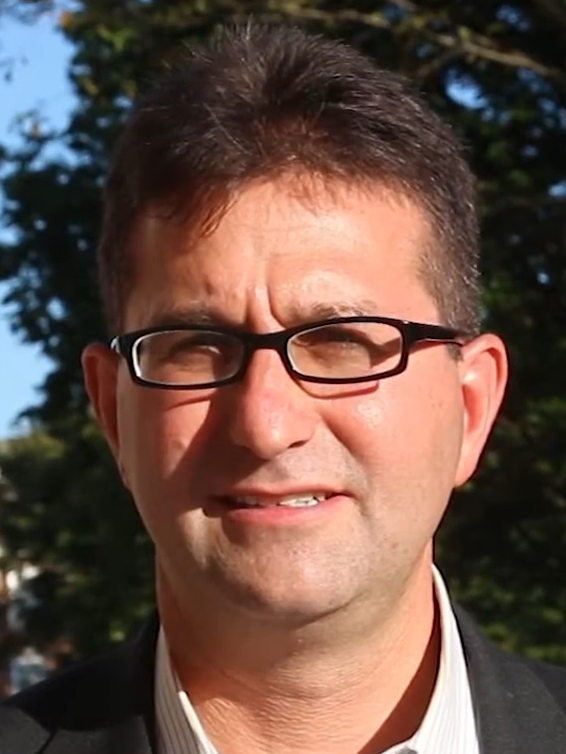
Nominee	Matt Meyer	Mark Blake
Party	Democratic	Republican
Popular vote	162,595	81,578
Percentage	66.6%	33.4%
County Executive before election
Thomas P. Gordon
Democratic
Elected County Executive
Matt Meyer
Democratic

The 2016 New Castle County Executive election was held on Tuesday, November 8, 2016, to elect the County Executive of New Castle County, Delaware. Democrat Matt Meyer defeated Republican Mark Blake with 66.6% of the vote.

Incumbent Democratic County Executive Thomas P. Gordon had controversially sought an unprecedented fourth term in office, but lost the primary in an upset to Meyer by a 4-point margin.

== Democratic primary ==
=== Candidates ===
==== Nominee ====
- Matt Meyer, attorney and teacher

==== Eliminated in primary ====
- Thomas P. Gordon, incumbent New Castle County Executive

=== Results ===
Democratic primary results
Party	Candidate	Votes	%
Democratic	Matt Meyer	22,478	52.3%
Democratic	Thomas P. Gordon (incumbent)	20,478	47.7%
Total votes		42,956	100%

== Republican primary ==
=== Candidates ===
==== Nominee ====
- Mark Blake, property management firm owner and Republican nominee for County Executive in 2012

==== Eliminated in primary ====
- Barry Nahe, county government employee

=== Results ===
Republican primary results
Party	Candidate	Votes	%
Republican	Mark Blake	8,749	82.7%
Republican	Barry Nahe	1,829	17.3%
Total votes		10,578	100%

== General election results ==
2016 New Castle County Executive election
Party	Candidate	Votes	%	±%
Democratic	Matt Meyer	162,595	66.59%	+2.69%
Republican	Mark Blake	81,578	33.41%	−2.69%
Write-in		32	0.00%	
Total votes		492,635	100%	
Democratic hold				
