= Lydia York =

American politician

Auditor of Delaware
- Incumbent
- Assumed office January 3, 2023
- Governor: John Carney; Bethany Hall-Long; Matt Meyer
- Preceded by: Dennis Greenhouse

Personal details
- Born: 1958 or 1959 (age 66–67) Southern Pines, North Carolina, U.S.
- Party: Democratic
- Education: Florida A&M University (BS); University of Pennsylvania (MBA); Temple University (JD, LLM)

Lydia E. York (born 1958/1959) is an American attorney, accountant, and Democratic politician who is the Delaware Auditor of Accounts. York is the first African American woman to be elected to an executive office in Delaware. She was first elected in the 2022 general election after winning the 2022 Democratic primary, where she defeated incumbent auditor Kathy McGuiness in a 42-point landslide.

== Early life and education ==
York was born in Southern Pines, North Carolina, and moved to Pittsburgh at the age of six. She graduated from Peabody High School. York earned a Bachelor of Science degree in accounting from Florida A&M University, a Master of Business Administration from the Wharton School of the University of Pennsylvania, and a Juris Doctor and Master of Laws in taxation from the Temple University Beasley School of Law.

== Career ==
From 1979 to 1983, York worked as an accountant for Coopers & Lybrand. She later worked as a credit officer for Mellon Bank. From 1991 to 1997, she was a senior financial analyst for the Duquesne Light Company. As a law student, she clerked for the New Jersey Superior Court. York was an associate at Poppiti Law in 2011 and 2012 and has been a staff attorney and office manager of Stewarts Law since 2012.

In October 2021, Delaware Auditor of Accounts Kathy McGuiness was indicted on multiple corruption charges. York announced that she would challenge McGuiness in the Democratic primary and was endorsed by the Delaware Democratic Party. York won the primary election against McGuiness and the general election against Republican Janice Lorrah. York was sworn in on Jan. 3, 2023 at Delaware State University in Dover, Delaware as the first African-American woman to be elected to an executive office in Delaware.

Political offices
Preceded by Dennis Greenhouse	Auditor of Delaware; 2023–present	Incumbent
