= 2020 Wilmington mayoral election =

- November 3, 2020
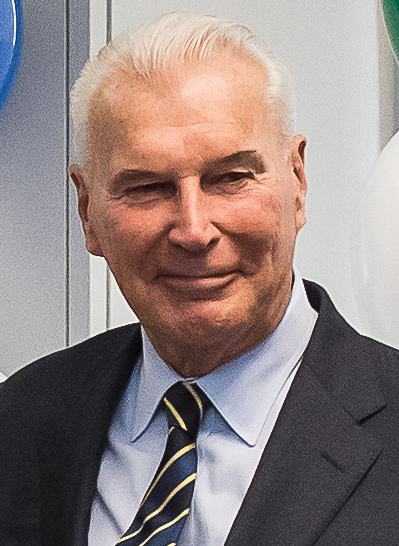
Nominee	Mike Purzycki
Party	Democratic
Popular vote	25,440
Percentage	100%
Mayor before election
Mike Purzycki
Democratic
Elected mayor
Mike Purzycki
Democratic

The 2020 Wilmington mayoral election was held on Tuesday, November 3, 2020, to elect the mayor of Wilmington, Delaware. Incumbent mayor Mike Purzycki won re-election to a second term. Mike Purzycki first won election in 2016 with 82.2% of the vote.

Purzycki faced a competitive primary, winning the Democratic nomination by a 7.26% margin, a difference of 1,019 votes. Purzycki won 100% of the vote in the general election as he was the only candidate on the ballot.

== Democratic primary ==
=== Candidates ===
==== Nominee ====
- Mike Purzycki, incumbent mayor

==== Eliminated in primary ====
- Velda Jones-Potter, Wilmington city treasurer
- Justen Wright, former Wilmington city councilman

==== Declined ====
- Dennis P. Williams, former mayor

=== Results ===
Democratic primary results
Party	Candidate	Votes	%
Democratic	Mike Purzycki (incumbent)	6,133	42.88%
Democratic	Velda Jones-Potter	5,094	35.62%
Democratic	Justen Wright	3,075	21.50%
Total votes			100.0%

== General election ==
=== Candidates ===
- Mike Purzycki (Democratic), incumbent mayor

=== Results ===
Wilmington mayoral election, 2020
Party	Candidate	Votes	%
Democratic	Mike Purzycki (incumbent)	25,440	100%
Total votes		25,440	100%
