= Cape Gazette =

American community newspaper in Lewes, Delaware

- Type: Twice-weekly newspaper
- Owner: Chris Rausch
- Founder(s): Dennis Forney and Trish Vernon
- Publisher: Chris Rausch
- Editor: Jen Ellingsworth
- Founded: May 1993
- Headquarters: 17585 Nassau Commons Boulevard, Lewes, Delaware 19958
- Circulation: 23,000
- ISSN: 2833-8650
- Website: capegazette.com

Cape Gazette is an independently owned and operated twice-weekly, community newspaper published in Lewes, Delaware. It is currently available every Tuesday and Friday. The newspaper covers the Cape Region, an area in southeastern Sussex County, Delaware.

== History ==
After a local weekly newspaper, The Whale, converted to a daily publication with greater statewide coverage and less community focus, Cape Gazette was founded in 1993 by publisher Dennis Forney and editor Trish Vernon. The venture aimed at bringing back a reliable source of news and information for and about the Cape Region.

In the inaugural issue on May 28, 1993, Forney wrote, "Cape Gazette is designed to celebrate the lives and times of the people who live and own property in what many people consider one of the most beautiful and unique areas along the eastern seaboard."

Cape Gazette's primary website CapeGazette.com was launched in 1998. In 2000, a free visitor's guide, Beach Paper, was created to run during the summer months. As the economy grew during the next few years, Cape Gazette's paper size justified the publication of an additional mid-week edition on Tuesdays, beginning on June 8, 2004. An online digital edition became available in 2005.

== Current operations ==
Cape Gazette's primary coverage area is Delaware's Cape Region, radiating north, west and south from Cape Henlopen where the Delaware Bay meets the Atlantic Ocean.

Published Tuesday & Friday, the Cape Gazette sells more than 23,000 copies each week. More than 8,000 mail subscribers receive the Cape Gazette home delivery every Tuesday and Friday. Additionally, 7,000 and 8,600 copies are sold on newsstands every Tuesday and Friday respectively. Online digital versions of each issue are also available.

At the end of 2021, Dennis Forney and Trish Vernon retired. The Cape Gazette was sold to general manager Chris Rausch.

Towns covered:

- Lewes
- Rehoboth Beach
- Harbeson
- Milton
- Millsboro
- Georgetown
- Dewey Beach
- Bethany Beach
- Ocean View
- Clarksville

=== Website ===
CapeGazette.com launched on April 1, 1998. In 2011, the website was upgraded a content management system which enabled readers, advertisers and organizations to contribute their voice to Cape Gazette's online content. Memberships for advertisers and organizations provide a micro-site in which they can post information about their business and share articles and special offers. Memberships for readers offer e-edition and archive access. The website receives an average of over 25,000 unique users per day.

=== Awards ===
As members of the Maryland Delaware D.C. Press Association (MDDC), Cape Gazette's work has regularly been recognized each year at the annual MDDC Editorial and Advertising Contests. In 2015, the ad and production departments won 25 awards in 17 categories, as well as the Sweepstakes Award in their division for the greatest number of prizes. They also received the trophy for Best in Show across all divisions for the second year in a row.

=== Jim Cresson Memorial Fund Scholarship ===
Jim Cresson was a journalist for the Cape Gazette who died in a tragic accident in 2005. He was a Vietnam veteran, outdoorsman, artist, and musician who had a great love for his country and nature, and a deep affinity with the Native Americans who reside in Delaware. The Jim Cresson Memorial Scholarship was established to keep his memory alive and provide a $1,000 cash scholarship to further a student's interest in journalistic or creative writing. This award can be used for such educational expenses as tuition, room and board, textbooks or computer equipment, and is paid directly to the students.
