= Chipman Flowers Jr. =

American lawyer

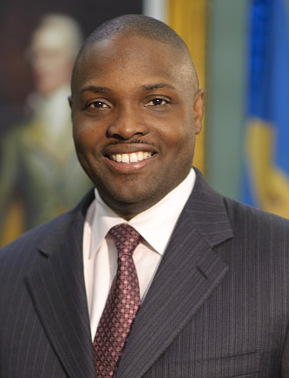

Treasurer of Delaware
- In office January 2, 2011 – January 5, 2015
- Governor: Jack Markell
- Preceded by: Velda Jones-Potter
- Succeeded by: Ken Simpler

Personal details
- Born: December 27, 1974 (age 51) Honolulu, Hawaii, U.S.
- Party: Democratic
- Education: University of Pennsylvania; Georgetown University Law Center; Harvard Kennedy School
- Occupation: Politician, attorney, business owner

Chipman L. Flowers Jr. (born December 27, 1974, in Honolulu, Hawaii) is an American politician, attorney and business owner who served as the treasurer of the state of Delaware from 2011 to 2015. A member of the Democratic Party, Flowers became the first African American to win a statewide election in Delaware when he was elected treasurer in November 2010 at the age of 35. At the time, he was Delaware's youngest statewide elected official. He is currently the President and Managing Member of The Flowers Counsel Group, LLC, a law firm he founded in 2006, and serves as Deputy Legal Counsel of the Massachusetts Democratic Party.

== Early life and education ==
Flowers is the youngest child of Ltc. Chipman L. Flowers Sr., a retired Army officer, and C. Jean Johnson Flowers, a former teacher and guidance counselor for the U.S. Department of Defense Dependent Schools. Flowers' father was commissioned by General Daniel "Chappie" James, the nation's first African-American four-star general officer in the United States.

== Early life ==
As the son of a military officer, Flowers traveled extensively in his youth, attending public schools in Dallas, Texas, Lawton, Oklahoma, and Pittsburgh, Pennsylvania. He attended middle and high school in Italy while his father was stationed overseas. He is a graduate of Vicenza American High School in Vicenza, Italy. He graduated from the University of Pennsylvania in 1996, earning a bachelor's degree in economics, and then attended Georgetown University, where he earned his Juris Doctor degree and a Master of Business Administration in 2000. While attending Georgetown, Flowers worked at the A. Philip Randolph Institute, the Congressional Joint Economic Committee and in the White House Office of Political Affairs during the Clinton administration.

Flowers later studied at the Harvard Kennedy School where he earned a Master of Public Administration and received the Don K. Price Award for academic excellence and public service.

== Career ==
After graduating from Georgetown, Flowers began his legal career in Delaware in the Wilmington office of Skadden, Arps, Slate, Meagher & Flom, LLP, where he worked as a mergers and acquisitions attorney. He served as chairman of the Multicultural Judges and Lawyers Section of the Delaware State Bar Association. Flowers worked as the Chief Democratic Analyst for Delaware Tonight, a nightly news program on WHYY-TV, where he served until the show was cancelled.

In 2006, Flowers founded Flowers Counsel Group, LLC, a corporate law firm that specializes in mergers and acquisitions and procurement law. The firm, which is one of the region's largest minority-owned corporate law firms, provides corporate purchasing services for international and Fortune 500 companies, as well as the nation's leading academic institutions and has represented clients in transactions totaling in excess of $1 billion.

== Treasurer of Delaware ==
=== Campaign and election ===
In 2010, after a largely self-financed campaign, Flowers won the Democratic primary for Delaware State Treasurer against incumbent Velda Jones-Potter, who was appointed by Governor Jack Markell to serve the remainder of his term, with 54.3 percent of the vote. His platform, entitled “The Flowers Framework for Restoring Prosperity,” included a "Financial Warning System" that aimed to categorize economic conditions using a color scheme. Additionally, Flowers proposed a "Hometown Tax Credit" that encouraged businesses to hire from Delaware schools.

In the general election in November 2010, Flowers defeated Colin Bonini, a three-term Republican state senator from the Dover area, 153,203 to 147,031. Flowers, elected at the age of 35, became the first African-American elected to serve in Delaware and was the youngest statewide elected official during his term.

=== Term ===
In 2011, his first year in office, Flowers restructured the Delaware State Treasury into four distinct offices and began publishing the Delaware Economic Index. He implemented the Delaware Early Warning System, a financial warning system that rates the health of the state's economy. Within 90 days of assuming office, Flowers also was confronted with the challenge of deciding whether to remove hundreds of millions of uncollateralized state funds from a potential failing financial institution, Wilmington Trust, that failed to meet the state's standards for holding deposits prior to his assuming office. To resolve the issue, Flowers ordered the failing financial institution to move state funds into federally insured transaction accounts and proposed major reforms to diversify the state's assets by spreading state deposits throughout multiple financial institutions to reduce risk.

Though his actions to reduce the state's exposure to the failing financial institution was viewed as necessary and proper by many in the financial community and among his fellow Treasurers, it created tension with Governor Jack Markell and the Cash Management Policy Board that lasted throughout his term.he That year, he was elected to the executive committee of the National Association of State Treasurers, representing the treasurers of the Eastern states. He donated his entire first year salary of over $100,000 to fund two fellowships at the Treasury in partnership with United Way of Delaware.

=== Cash Management Policy Board debate ===
During 2012, Flowers and Governor Markell debated over the role of the state's Cash Management Policy Board and the need for “open and competitive” contracts in securing the state's investment managers. Flowers contended that the board's investment decisions had led to lower than average returns on the state's investment portfolio and the state needed to engage new investment managers on an open and competitive basis to increase returns and reduce fees. Markell and his aides, supporting the board, claimed that Flowers was attempting to usurp the board's traditional responsibilities to hire fund managers and make decisions about investment policies. Flowers commissioned a report by Credit Suisse Securities USA, LLC, which determined that the rate of return on the state's portfolio lagged behind the returns realized by similar states. He authored an article that summarized his position. That same year, he increased the returns of the portfolio by $4 million. Flowers, under a revamped model, made over $55 million for the State of Delaware during his term.

Following publication of the Credit Suisse report, the state Treasury began reallocating assets. In October 2012, the Treasury and the board reached agreement to diversify the state's assets, increase the number of investment managers and require them to meet certain financial performance benchmarks. The Treasury also negotiated a lower fee structure.

=== Financial education and protection of state deposits ===
In May 2012, the White House commended Delaware and two other state treasuries, for their efforts to promote financial literacy, praising both the Delaware Economic Index and the Prosperity Portal, a web-based repository of information on financial topics. In early 2013, all three major rating agencies (Moody's, Standard & Poor's and Fitch) awarded a AAA rating to Delaware's bonds. Later in 2012, when the federal Transaction Account Guarantee ("TAG") Program was set to expire, Flowers made a decision to secure Delaware's state deposits by requiring banks holding state funds to post collateral for state accounts with the Federal Reserve (prior to taking office, Delaware was one of a couple of states that did not require state funds to be collateralized by its financial institutions). This action protected hundreds of millions of state funds and is viewed as one of his major achievements of his term.

=== Honest Way proposal ===
In January 2013, Flowers held a major press conference proposing a series of reforms called the "Honest Way" proposals to reform Delaware's financial system - particularly, the operations of the state's Cash Board. Under the Honest Way proposals, Flowers proposed that members of the state's Cash Board would have to file annual financial disclosures (the Cash Board was only required to file disclosures when initially appointed to the Cash Board with no annual update requirement), meet at least quarterly in the management of the state's investments (the Cash Board was only required to meet twice a year), recuse from votes where members have a conflict (the Cash Board had no policy that required its members to recuse from votes where the members had a personal interest), require term limits (some of the Cash Board members had served since the early 80s) and prohibit Cash Board members from making political contributions from elected officials having a role in the state's finances. Flowers stated the impetus of the proposals was one of the Cash Board members, who had given significant funds to the Governor's campaign and his political action committee, had requested the Treasury place state funds in financial institutions based on his personal interest, not the best interest of the state. The proposals resulted in months of public debate regarding the role of the Cash Board, with the Governor and Democratic leaders of the legislature opposing the proposed reforms. During the press conference, Flowers stated, "I want to work with an honorable Board operating with integrity, not a corrupt Board seeking to use your money for their advantage ... I want to do it the right way, not the corrupt way."

In February 2013, in a rare vote, Flowers almost achieved a major upset when the state's Republican caucus in the House of Representatives joined some Democrats causing a tie vote for a reform measure sponsored by State Rep. John Kowalko that would have immediately adopted the annual financial disclosure requirement for the Cash Board over opposition from the Governor and the Speaker of the House of Representatives (ultimately, the reforms were sent to a committee of the state legislature for review). However, as political payback, the Governor and Democratic leaders of the legislature introduced legislation to reduce the powers of the State Treasurer. Flowers refused to back down and ultimately, certain portions of the Honest Way reforms were adopted by the state's General Assembly.

In February 2014, Flowers released The Fourth Report on the Delaware State Treasury, which noted over 35 accomplishments during his tenure, highlighted by the state portfolio returning over $44 million (including positive returns 30 out of 37 months), measures to protect the state's portfolio and a $400,000 reduction in annual fees.

=== Travel expense issue ===
In November 2013, Flowers was questioned about funds spent during a business trip to Alaska with then-deputy treasurer Erika MacZuba Benner the previous year. Flowers stated that his travel expenses were justified and that he spent the trip meeting with bankers and lawyers regarding Delaware's $2 billion portfolio. The trip was subject to reimbursement by the National Association of State Treasurers, but the reimbursement was incorrectly filed by a Treasury staff member. Flowers, who contributed over $550,000 to his campaigns and donated over $100,000 of his first year salary, chose to return $460.80 for the trip and returned an additional $415.25 for an additional day's stay related to a National Association of State Auditors, Comptrollers and Treasurers meeting in Seattle in 2012. On July 30, 2014, the Office of the Auditor of Accounts issued a full report that found that Flowers had traveled for only legitimate business purposes and his travel to Alaska and Seattle were paid (in full or in part) by the National Association of State Treasurers and the National Association of State Auditors, Comptrollers and Treasurers, resulting in the State of Delaware owing him for his reimbursements.

=== Controversy and decision not to seek re-election ===
Democrat Sean Barney, a former policy director for Governor Markell and former advisor to U.S. Senator Tom Carper, challenged Flowers in the Democratic primary. In August 2014, former deputy treasurer Erika MacZuba Benner accused Flowers of harassing and threatening her earlier that year. Flowers vehemently denied the allegations, and the authorities ultimately cleared Flowers of any criminal wrongdoing. On August 15, 2014, Flowers announced that he was dropping out of the race and would be leaving Delaware at the conclusion of his term. Republican Ken Simpler defeated Barney in the general election.

At the conclusion of his term, Flowers held a press conference in which he criticized the state's media and political leadership for their conduct during his time in office.

| Preceded by Velda Jones-Potter | Treasurer of Delaware; 2011–2015 | Succeeded by Ken Simpler |
