= Velda Jones-Potter =

American politician (born 1957/58)

Treasurer of Delaware
- In office January 20, 2009 – January 1, 2011
- Governor: Jack Markell
- Preceded by: Jack Markell
- Succeeded by: Chip Flowers

Personal details
- Born: 1957 or 1958 (age 67–68)
- Party: Democratic
- Spouse: Charles Potter Jr.
- Education: University of Delaware (BS); Indiana University Bloomington (MBA)

Velda Jones-Potter (born 1957/1958) is an American businesswoman and politician. She was appointed by Jack Markell to finish out his term as Delaware State Treasurer when he was elected governor in 2008. She lost her bid for election in the 2010 Democratic primary to Chip Flowers. She unsuccessfully ran for mayor of Wilmington in 2020 and 2024.

== Early life and career ==
Jones-Potter attended P. S. Dupont High School. She was the first African American woman to graduate from the University of Delaware with a Bachelor of Science degree in engineering. Jones-Potter obtained her MBA from Indiana University. She worked for DuPont for 17 years and served as an executive vice president for MBNA.

== Political career ==
When Jack Markell was elected governor in 2008, he appointed Jones-Potter to finish out his term as Delaware State Treasurer. She became the first African American to hold statewide office in Delaware. She ran for election to the position in 2010 as the incumbent but lost in the Democratic primary to Chip Flowers, who won with 54 percent and went on to win the general election against Republican Colin Bonini. During the campaign, she faced scrutiny for receiving over $100,000 in consulting fees from the City of Wilmington between 2007 and 2010.

In 2016, Jones-Potter won the three-way Democratic primary for Wilmington City Treasurer with 40 percent against Darius J. Brown and Kenneth Matlusky. She was elected unopposed in the general election. By winning this election, Jones-Potter became the first African-American woman to serve as the Wilmington City Treasurer. In 2018, The News Journal reported that she had sought a raise of $21,647, or nearly 20 percent over her current salary of $113,933, as well as raises for her appointees in the treasury department.

== Legal controversies ==
In 2017, Jones-Potter and her husband, Charles Potter Jr., were at risk of losing their home to a sheriff's sale as a result of "ongoing litigation stemming from home repairs." A Delaware Superior Court judge rejected all of the couple's complaints after finding them liable for failing to pay a construction contractor over $60,000 and criticized their "kitchen sink" tactics in the litigation. The Delaware Supreme Court rejected two appeals by the couple, and upheld a judgement of $116,000, plus interest, against them in 2018.

In 2018, the Delaware Superior Court rejected an attempt by the Potters to force the City of Wilmington's Licenses and Inspections Department to hold the contractor liable for code violations. The judge ruled that the couple cannot use the city to obtain compensation for losing their earlier legal disputes and criticized their use of the courts as spiteful. The Potters' appeal to the Delaware Supreme Court was rejected in 2019.

Political offices
Preceded by Jack Markell	Treasurer of Delaware; 2009–2011	Succeeded by Chip Flowers
