= Thomas P. Gordon =

American politician

Thomas Gordon

7th and 10th New Castle County Executive
- In office November 13, 2012 – January 3, 2017
- Preceded by: Paul Clark
- Succeeded by: Matt Meyer
- In office January 8, 1997 – January 4, 2005
- Preceded by: Dennis Greenhouse
- Succeeded by: Chris Coons

Personal details
- Born: September 10, 1952 (age 74) Wilmington, Delaware, U.S.
- Party: Democratic
- Spouse: Susan
- Children: 3
- Education: Wilmington University

Thomas P. Gordon (born September 10, 1952) is an American politician and former law enforcement officer. He served as chief of police for New Castle County, Delaware prior to being elected to county executive. He was defeated by Matt Meyer in 2016 during his bid for an unprecedented fourth term as county executive.

== Biography ==
Born and raised in Wilmington, Delaware, Gordon attended Salesianum School, a private Catholic men's high school operated by the Oblates of St. Francis de Sales. He received both his bachelor's and master's degrees from Wilmington University. He is a graduate of the FBI National Academy as well as the United States Secret Service Protection Program.

Gordon joined the New Castle County Police Department in 1975 and was assigned to the Patrol Division Criminal Unit and the Attorney General's White Collar Crime Unit. He was promoted to sergeant in 1980, lieutenant in 1984, and captain in 1988. He was co-commander of the state's first serial killer task force which led to the apprehension and prosecution of Steven Brian Pennell, the only known serial killer in Delaware history. He eventually became Chief of Police, serving in the role for eight years.

Gordon served as the president of the Fraternal Order of Police in Delaware from 1984 to 1986. The Law Enforcement Officer Bill of Rights was signed into law on May 13, 1985, during Gordon's term as president. Gordon worked closely with then Senator Joseph Biden in the creation and writing of the U.S. Crime Bill which was signed into law by President Bill Clinton in 1994. He retired from the police department to run for county executive.

In 1997, Gordon was elected as county executive for New Castle County and reelected to a second term four years later. During this time, he expanded parks and libraries in the county, raised wages for county employees, and increased county spending by more than 45 percent, helped by his successful effort to increase the amount of the state real estate transfer tax went to the county.

In May 2004, Gordon was charged with corruption, racketeering, and mail fraud over allegations that his chief administrative officer, Sherry Freebery, had accepted millions of dollars in bribes from du Pont heiress Lisa Dean Moseley. The grand jury indictment included claims that county employees were ordered to work on personal projects and that a sexual harassment lawsuit was settled to avoid disclosure to the public. He decided against running for reelection that year. All felony charges were eventually dropped, and Gordon pleaded guilty in 2007 to two misdemeanors for failing to keep adequate tax records.

Gordon ran for New Castle County executive again in 2012. With David Grimaldi as his campaign manager, Gordon defeated the party-endorsed incumbent Paul Clark in the primary and became the first person to win a third term to the office. He was defeated in the next election, losing the 2016 Democratic primary election to political newcomer Matt Meyer in his attempt to become the first four-term county executive in the history of New Castle County.
