= Tom Wagner (politician) =

American politician

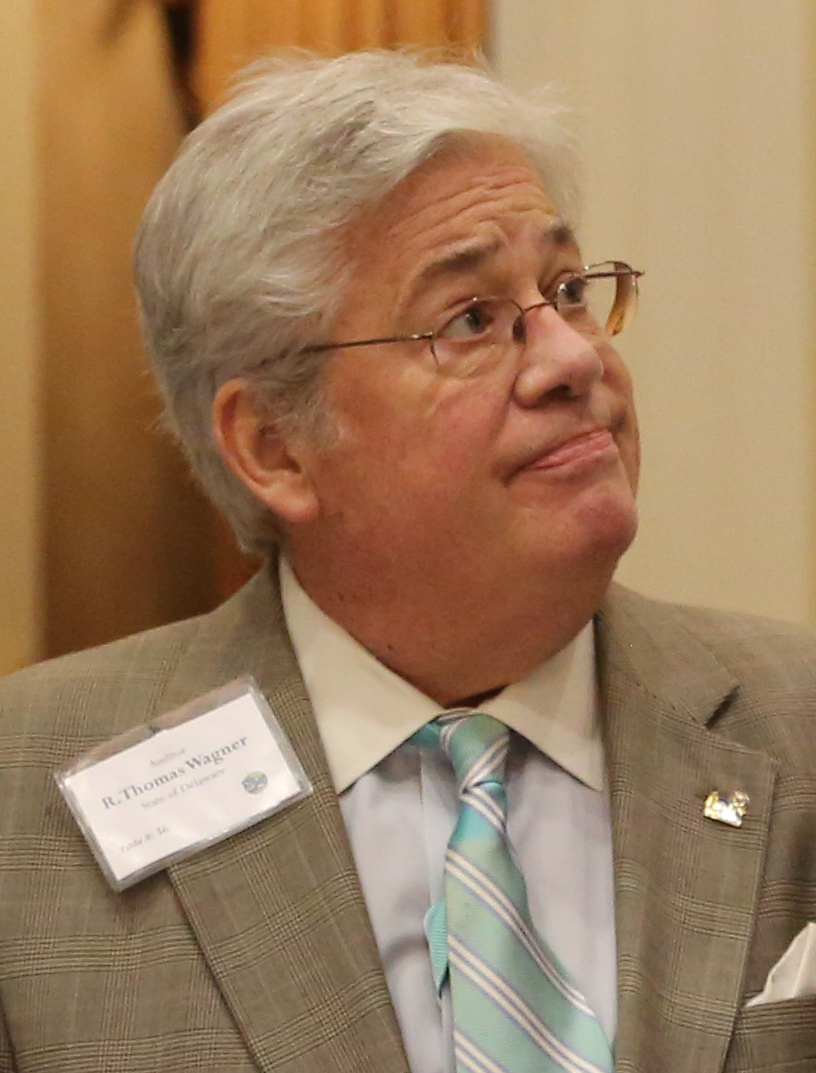
- Wagner in 2017

Auditor of Delaware
- In office January 20, 1989 – January 1, 2019
- Governor: Mike Castle; Dale Wolf; Tom Carper; Ruth Ann Minner; Jack Markell; John Carney
- Preceded by: Dennis Greenhouse
- Succeeded by: Kathy McGuiness

Personal details
- Party: Republican
- Education: Wesley College; University of Richmond (BS); Wilmington University (MBA)

Robert Thomas Wagner Jr. served as Delaware's state auditor from 1989 to 2019. A Republican, he lost to incumbent Democratic Auditor Dennis Greenhouse in 1986, but was appointed to the position in 1989 after Greenhouse resigned after being elected New Castle County County Executive. He was elected to full terms in 1990, 1994, 1998, 2002, 2006, 2010 and 2014. Prior to becoming auditor, Wagner was mayor of Camden, Delaware.

On February 17, 2018, Wagner announced that he would not seek reelection in the November general election, citing health concerns in his need for a kidney transplant taking attention away from his job.

== Electoral history ==
1986 Delaware State Auditor election
Party	Candidate	Votes	%
Democratic	Dennis Greenhouse (incumbent)	84,924	54.60%
Republican	R. Thomas Wagner Jr.	69,640	44.77%
American	Karel Vanderheyden	988	00.63%
Total votes		155,552	100%
Democratic hold			

1990 Delaware State Auditor election
Party	Candidate	Votes	%
Republican	R. Thomas Wagner Jr. (incumbent)	88,850	51.86%
Democratic	Lillian Moore Dowd	82,483	48.14%
Total votes		171,333	100%
Republican hold			

1994 Delaware State Auditor election
Party	Candidate	Votes	%
Republican	R. Thomas Wagner Jr. (incumbent)	120,989	64.52%
Democratic	Evelyn Alemar	66,534	35.48%
Total votes		187,523	100%
Republican hold			

1998 Delaware State Auditor election
Party	Candidate	Votes	%
Republican	R. Thomas Wagner Jr. (incumbent)	101,207	57.94%
Democratic	Dianne Kempski	73,475	42.06%
Total votes		174,682	100%
Republican hold			

2002 Delaware State Auditor election
Party	Candidate	Votes	%
Republican	R. Thomas Wagner Jr. (incumbent)	136,410	61.82%
Democratic	Robert Wasserbach	84,248	38.18%
Total votes		220,658	100%
Republican hold			

2006 Delaware State Auditor election
Party	Candidate	Votes	%
Republican	R. Thomas Wagner Jr. (incumbent)	131,592	53.70%
Democratic	Michael John Dalto	113,475	46.30%
Total votes		245,067	100%
Republican hold			

2010 Delaware State Auditor election
Party	Candidate	Votes	%
Republican	R. Thomas Wagner Jr. (incumbent)	150,156	50.43%
Democratic	Richard Korn	147,593	49.57%
Total votes		297,749	100%
Republican hold			

2014 Delaware State Auditor election
Party	Candidate	Votes	%
Republican	R. Thomas Wagner Jr. (incumbent)	123,100	54.22%
Democratic	Brenda Mayrack	103,939	45.78%
Total votes		227,039	100%
Republican hold			

Political offices
Preceded by Dennis Greenhouse	Auditor of Delaware; 1989–2019	Succeeded by Kathy McGuiness
