= Delaware Auditor of Accounts =

Constitutional officer

Auditor of Accounts of Delaware
- Incumbent; Lydia York since January 3, 2023
- Style: Mister or Madam Auditor (informal); The Honorable (formal)
- Seat: Delaware State Capitol; Dover, Delaware
- Appointer: General election
- Term length: Four years, unlimited
- Constituting instrument: Article III, Section 21, Delaware Constitution
- Formation: July 4, 1897 (129 years ago)
- Salary: $112,667
- Website: Official website

The auditor of accounts of Delaware is a constitutional officer in the executive branch of the U.S. state of Delaware. The incumbent is Lydia York, a Democrat, who was elected to the position in the November 2022 general election and sworn in on January 3, 2023, at Delaware State University. Auditor York was preceded by Dennis Greenhouse, who was appointed to the position by Governor John Carney after former auditor of accounts Kathy McGuiness resigned on October 19, 2022.

== Powers and duties ==
The auditor of accounts provides independent oversight of governments' use of taxpayer dollars through an array of external audits, be it assessments of financial condition, legal compliance, or program performance. The Office of the Auditor of Accounts also investigates fraud, waste, and abuse of public funds and resources and makes special reports on financial issues relevant to state and local government.

== List of auditors ==
- George Warren Cripps (1966–1973)
- Richard T. Collins (1974–1983)
- Dennis Greenhouse (1983–1989)
- Tom Wagner (1989–2019)
- Kathy McGuiness (2019–2022)
- Dennis Greenhouse (2022–2023)
- Lydia York (2023–present)
