= Colleen Davis =

American politician (born 1979/80)

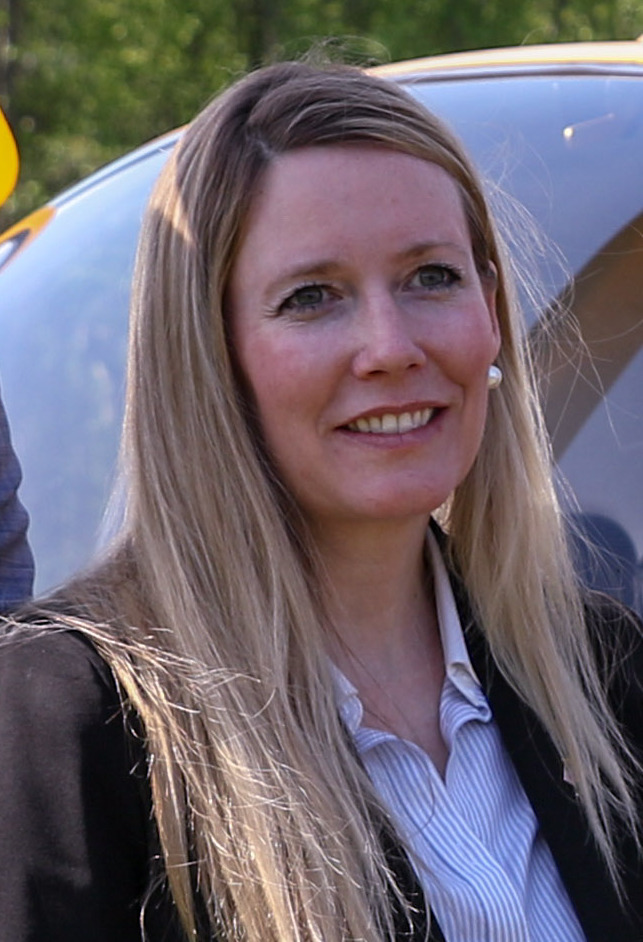

Treasurer of Delaware
- Incumbent
- Assumed office January 1, 2019
- Governor: John Carney; Bethany Hall-Long; Matt Meyer
- Preceded by: Ken Simpler

Personal details
- Born: Colleen Carroll; 1979 or 1980 (age 46–47)
- Party: Democratic
- Education: Philadelphia University (BS, MS)

Colleen Davis (née Carroll; born 1979 or 1980) is an American politician and a member of the Democratic Party serving as the Delaware State Treasurer since 2019.

== Early life and career ==
As a child, Davis moved from the suburbs of Baltimore, Maryland to Sussex County, Delaware, where she grew up. She graduated from Indian River High School in 1998 and attended Philadelphia University on a soccer scholarship. Prior to running for office, she worked as a financial consultant for medical systems. In 2016, she moved to Dagsboro, Delaware with her husband Anthony and their three children.

== Political career ==
Davis ran for Delaware State Treasurer in the 2018 elections as a member of the Democratic Party. She defeated incumbent Republican Ken Simpler. Her victory was a major upset and was one of several losses for prominent Republicans in Delaware. She was sworn into office on January 1, 2019.

During her first term, Davis developed and advocated for House Bill 205, the legislation that created Delaware EARNS, a retirement savings program for small business employees that was signed into law by Governor John Carney in 2022. Registration for Delaware EARNS opened in July 2024, and the program surpassed $1 million in total assets by January 2025.

Davis ran for reelection in 2022 and defeated the Republican nominee, Greg Coverdale. She was sworn into office for her second term on January 1, 2023.

After Lisa Blunt Rochester announced that she would not run for reelection to the United States House of Representatives in Delaware's at-large congressional district in the 2024 elections, Davis announced her candidacy in the election in July 2023. She withdrew from the race in February 2024, citing family reasons and a wish to focus on her work as Treasurer.

== Legal issues ==
In November 2018, Davis was issued citations for driving on a suspended license and failure to show insurance and registration. Although she told a police officer that she has not driven on her suspended license, her claims were contradicted by a photo posted on the Facebook page of Tom Carper, who had campaigned with Davis. She pled guilty to speeding on December 20, 2018, and the other charges were dropped. It was the fourth time she had been charged with driving on a suspended license, after pleading guilty to the charge when she was 17 and to lesser charges twice when she was an adult.

== Electoral history ==
2018 Delaware State Treasurer election
Party	Candidate	Votes	%	±%
Democratic	Colleen Davis	187,225	52.36%	
Republican	Ken Simpler (incumbent)	163,999	45.87%	
Green	David Chandler	6,300	1.77%	
Total votes		357,524	100%	
Democratic gain from Republican				

2022 Delaware State Treasurer election
Party	Candidate	Votes	%	±%
Democratic	Colleen Davis (incumbent)	170,402	53.64%	+1.28%
Republican	Greg Coverdale	147,293	46.36%	+0.50%
Total votes		317,695	100%	
Democratic hold				

Political offices
Preceded by Ken Simpler	Treasurer of Delaware; 2019–present	Incumbent
