= Ken Simpler =

American politician

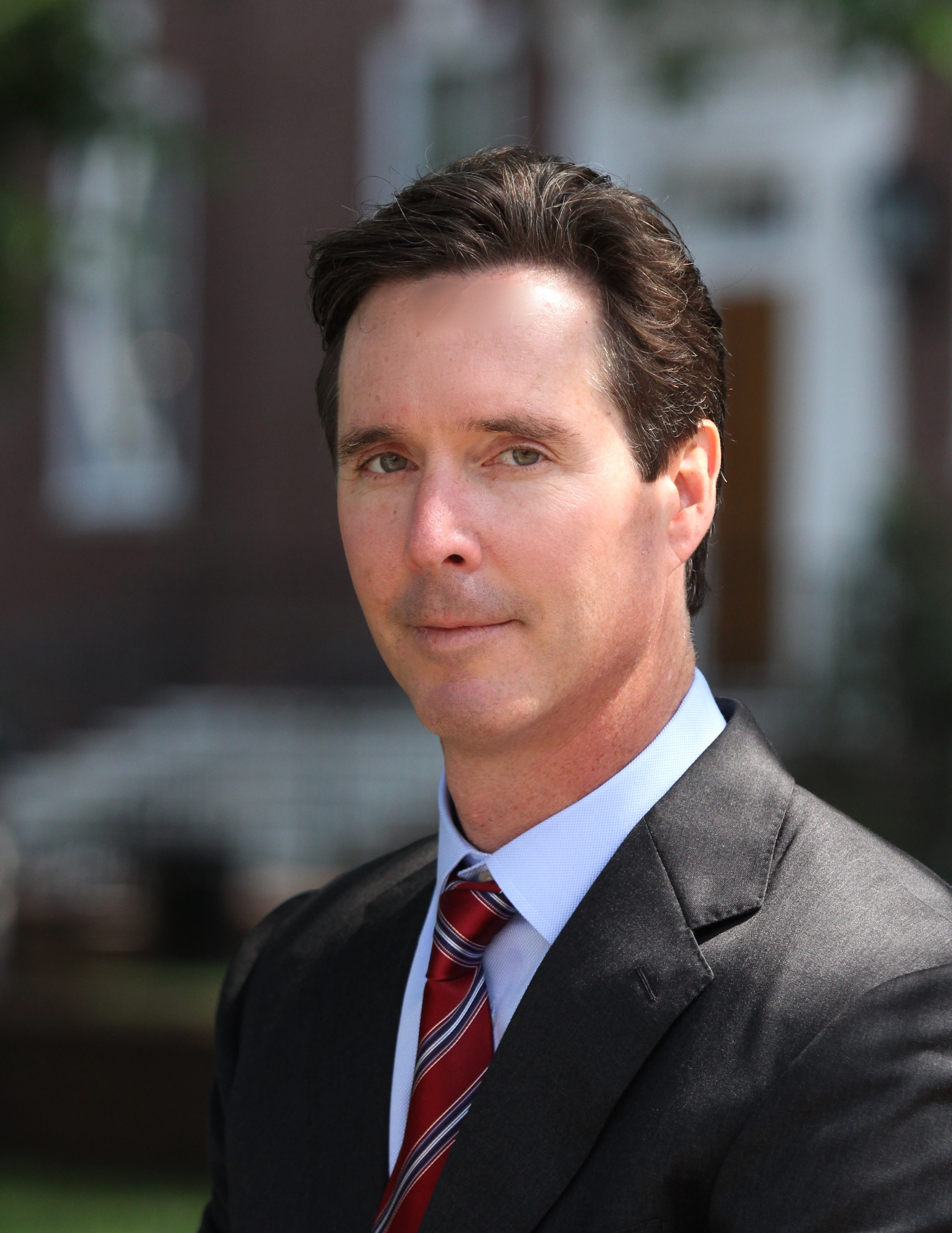

Treasurer of Delaware
- In office January 6, 2015 – January 1, 2019
- Governor: Jack Markell; John Carney
- Preceded by: Chip Flowers
- Succeeded by: Colleen Davis

Personal details
- Born: Kenneth Alvin Simpler, Jr. July 15, 1967 (age 58) Rehoboth Beach, Delaware, U.S.
- Party: Republican
- Spouse: Elizabeth Russell
- Children: 3
- Education: Princeton University (BA); University of Delaware (MPA); University of Chicago (JD, MBA)

Kenneth Alvin Simpler, Jr. (born July 15, 1967) is an American politician who served as Delaware State Treasurer from 2015 to 2019. He is to date the last Republican to win and hold a statewide office in Delaware.

== Education ==
Simpler attended high school at St. Andrew's School in Middletown, Delaware. He earned a Bachelor of Arts in political economy at Princeton University. While in college, he was charged in an incident where 45 students were sent to the Princeton infirmary or local hospital for alcohol-induced medical problems, including one student who was in a coma for 24 hours. He was sentenced to 30 days in jail for his role in hosting parties where alcohol was served to minors.

Simpler earned a Master of Business Administration and a J.D. from the University of Chicago. He was owner and chief financial officer of Seaboard Hotels and managing director at Citadel LLC. He worked as a corporate attorney at Kirkland & Ellis and has served on the board of directors of Draper Holdings, the parent company of WBOC and Fox 21.

While serving as Delaware State Treasurer, Simpler enrolled at the Joseph R. Biden, Jr. School of Public Policy & Administration at the University of Delaware to pursue a Master of Public Administration. After leaving office, he completed the degree in February 2020.

== Political career ==
Simpler was elected Delaware State Treasurer on November 4, 2014, and took office on January 6, 2015. In the 2018 elections, he was defeated in his reelection campaign by Democrat Colleen Davis. His defeat was one of several losses for prominent Republicans in Delaware in 2018 and to date makes him as the last Republican to serve statewide.

== Electoral history ==
Republican primary election results
Party	Candidate	Votes	%
Republican	Ken Simpler	13,491	53.88
Republican	Sher Valenzuela	11,549	46.12
Total votes		25,040	100.0

Delaware State Treasurer election, 2014
Party	Candidate	Votes	%
Republican	Ken Simpler	123,105	53.59
Democratic	Sean Barney	100,218	43.63
Green	David Chandler	6,373	2.77
Total votes		229,696	100.0
Republican gain from Democratic			

Delaware State Treasurer election, 2018
Party	Candidate	Votes	%
Democratic	Colleen Davis	187,225	52.36%
Republican	Ken Simpler (incumbent)	163,999	45.87%
Green	David Chandler	6,300	1.77%
Total votes		357,524	100%
Democratic gain from Republican			

Political offices
Preceded by Chip Flowers	Treasurer of Delaware; 2015–2019	Succeeded by Colleen Davis
