= Matt Meyer =

Governor of Delaware since 2025

- Meyer in 2026

76th Governor of Delaware
- Incumbent
- Assumed office January 21, 2025
- Lieutenant: Kyle Evans Gay
- Preceded by: Bethany Hall-Long

11th Executive of New Castle County
- In office January 3, 2017 – January 7, 2025
- Preceded by: Thomas P. Gordon
- Succeeded by: Marcus Henry

Personal details
- Born: September 29, 1971 (age 55) Bay City, Michigan, U.S.
- Party: Democratic
- Spouse: Lauren Meyer (m. 2023)
- Children: 1
- Education: Brown University (BA); University of Michigan (JD)
- Website: Office website Campaign website

Matthew Stephen Meyer (born September 29, 1971) is an American politician and attorney serving as the 76th governor of Delaware since 2025. A member of the Democratic Party, he previously served as the New Castle County executive from 2017 to 2025. Prior to tenure as county executive, Meyer worked as an attorney in private practice, and was an economic advisor to former Democratic governor Jack Markell and an advisor within the U.S. State Department.

== Early life and education ==
Meyer was born in Bay City, Michigan, and grew up in Wilmington, Delaware. He graduated from Wilmington Friends School, Brown University (cum laude in political science and computer science), and the University of Michigan Law School (member, Michigan Law Review).

Meyer worked on then-U.S. senator Joe Biden’s first presidential campaign in 1988 while in high school at the Wilmington Friends School. He then worked on the upstart, successful, 1990 gubernatorial campaign of Bruce Sundlun while attending Brown University.

== Educational and legal career ==
Meyer joined Teach for America, and taught public school in Washington, D.C. for three years. He also taught at Prestige Academy in Wilmington. He won a Skadden Fellowship upon graduation from law school and used it to work for Community Legal Aid in Wilmington. He then became an attorney working in mergers and acquisitions with Simpson Thacher and Bartlett. He served in Iraq as a diplomat for the U.S. State Department, as a senior economic adviser on the ground in Mosul, Iraq, working with military and economic aid leaders to assist the Iraqi people.

Later, he worked as an economic advisor to Delaware governor Jack Markell and was a partner at Potomac Law Group. In 2003 at the Kennedy Center in Washington, Meyer was awarded the Sam Beard Jefferson Award for the Greatest Public Service by an Individual 35 Years and Under; at that same ceremony Condoleezza Rice received a Jefferson Award.

== New Castle County Executive ==
=== Elections ===
In the 2016 Democratic primary for New Castle County executive, Meyer's campaign focused on integrity and economic policy. On September 13, Meyer upset three-term incumbent Tom Gordon, winning 52% of the vote. Meyer defeated Republican Mark Blake in the general election in November with 67% of the vote. He took office on January 3, 2017.

In 2020, Meyer faced a primary challenge from more centrist Maggie Jones. In July, Meyer faced allegations he made "belligerent" calls to two mayors who were supporting his opponent in the Democratic primary. Elsmere mayor Eric Scott Thompson and Newark mayor Jerry Clifton said Meyer's phone conversations with them were heated, and they felt the county executive made threats toward their communities by telling them that he "will remember this". Meyer refused to specifically address the accusations. On September 15, Meyer won the Democratic nomination, defeating Jones with 57% of the vote. Meyer won the general election unopposed.

=== Tenure ===
Meyer selected the first African-American police chief and chief administrative officer in the 106-year history of the New Castle County Police Department.

A joint report by National Association of Counties and National Academy of Public Administration on the use of federal CARES Act funds recognized New Castle County for using “innovative strategies in deploying Coronavirus Relief Fund dollars, with special attention to programs focusing on inclusive economic recovery and on assisting vulnerable and underserved populations.” In a July 2020 editorial for The News Journal, Meyer advocated for sending all teachers and students back to school in the fall during the coronavirus pandemic.

In October 2020, New Castle County purchased the former Sheraton South Hotel at auction with a winning bid of $19.5 million, also using CARES funds. The hotel can house more than 350 residents. The facility officially opened its doors in December 2020.

Meyer was awarded a regional Emmy in the Societal Concerns, Long-Form category at the 2022 Mid-Atlantic Emmy Awards as an executive producer on the short film "The Pathway Home" which chronicles the origins and first year of The Hope Center, a hotel-turn-homeless shelter New Castle County opened to house the homeless during the COVID-19 pandemic.

In August 2024, County Assessor Susan Oberlander filed a lawsuit against Meyer for suppressing sexual harassment complaints. Then-Lt. Governor Bethany Hall-Long issued a statement regarding the incident and previous accusations under Meyer's leadership: "Under Matt Meyer’s administration, year after year, too many women have suffered in silence, their voices unheard, and their careers derailed by a toxic culture that he has failed to address. This most recent lawsuit further shows that this cycle of sexual harassment under Meyer’s leadership has never been addressed. Instead of fostering a safe workplace for women, Matt Meyer has allowed a sanctuary for sexual harassment to flourish, enabling male perpetrators to act with impunity"

== Governor of Delaware ==
Meyer (left) with Lt. Governor Kyle Evans Gay and Congresswoman Sarah McBride in February 2025

=== 2024 gubernatorial election ===
Meyer, as a second-term county executive, was limited to serving two consecutive terms in office. In 2020, prior to his entrance into the race, he was characterized as a likely a front-runner for the Democratic Party's nomination for governor of Delaware in 2024. He officially announced his campaign on June 6, 2023. In the Democratic primary, he faced Lieutenant Governor Bethany Hall-Long. During the primary, he led Hall-Long in fundraising. He became the party's nominee after winning the primary on September 10, 2024.

In the general election, he faced Republican challenger Mike Ramone, a former state legislator. Meyer's campaign focused on a progressive platform, with stated goals such as universal pre-K, universal free school meals, the cancellation of medical debt, police accountability, and a state constitutional amendment enshrining the right to abortion. Meyer defeated Ramone, continuing the state's long streak of Democratic governors; no Republican had been elected since 1988.

=== Tenure ===
Following reports that Facebook parent company Meta Platforms was considering leaving Delaware to reincorporate elsewhere, Meyer reportedly convened with attorneys whose firms represented Meta, as well as Elon Musk and Tesla. CNBC reported that these meetings were scheduled in an effort to avoid a "DExit" of companies incorporated in Delaware; some 20% of state revenue derives from corporate franchise fees.

On January 24, 2025, just days into his tenure, Meyer signed an executive order aimed at streamlining the construction of affordable housing.

In May 2025, Meyer signed a bill to legalize assisted dying for those with terminal illness.

In July 2025, Meyer signed a bill preventing local and state authorities from cooperating with ICE immigration operations.

== Political views ==
In 2025, Meyer identified himself as "a pretty progressive Democrat".

In May 2017, Meyer issued an executive order forbidding New Castle County law enforcement from stopping, questioning, searching, or arresting an individual because of their immigration status, and forbidding county officials from cooperating with federal immigration enforcement operations, effectively making New Castle County a sanctuary county. Speaking on the executive order, Meyer stated, "Our county police, their job is to keep us all safe. Their job is not to execute and implement the immigration laws of the United States. Nor is the job of librarians or other people working for county government."

Meyer is an advocate for the legalization of marijuana, and wrote an opinion piece in 2022 criticizing Governor John Carney's decision vetoing the bill to legalize marijuana in Delaware and encouraged the state legislature to override Carney's veto.

Meyer supports a $15 an hour minimum wage, and raised the minimum wage for county workers to $15 an hour.

Following Governor John Carney's veto of the legalization of assisted suicide for patients with a terminal illness, Meyer criticized the veto, and stated that he would push for the bill to be passed again and would sign it into law if he is elected Governor.

Meyer faced protests from police unions in 2017 and 2019 due to disagreement over contract negotiations. Meyer responded, "I'm not going to give double or triple the salary increases to senior union leadership over the union membership. That's the line I'm drawing on behalf of the taxpayers of the county." Meyer supports the Black Lives Matter movement, and spoke of his support for the guilty verdict in the trial of Derek Chauvin, a police officer who murdered an unarmed black man, George Floyd. Following the 2021 police killing of 30-year old Lymond Moses, Meyer ordered the release of body camera footage of the incident against the request of police unions, saying that New Castle County residents have a "right to transparency". Moses's family supported Meyer's decision.

Meyer is a supporter of Israel, and in 2025 was described as a "lifelong Zionist." As of 2024, he has visited the country on three occasions. In an interview with Jewish Insider during his 2024 gubernatorial campaign, he said, "Israel is going through a really challenging time right now, and we have to do what we can to support what is one of America’s strongest allies in the world." He opposes the Boycott, Divestment and Sanctions (BDS) movement and indicated openness to signing anti-BDS laws as governor. Meyer advocates for closer cooperation between Delaware and Israel, and stated during his campaign that he would work to develop partnerships between the state of Delaware and Israeli companies if elected governor.

== Personal life ==
Meyer met his future wife, Dr. Lauren Cooksey, through a mutual friend in 2021; the couple married on May 7, 2023. They live in Wilmington, Delaware with their sons. He is Jewish, and is the second Jewish governor of Delaware, after Jack Markell. He was a member of the Aleph Zadik Aleph as a teen.

== Electoral history ==
=== 2016 ===
2016 New Castle County Executive Democratic primary results
Party	Candidate	Votes	%
Democratic	Matt Meyer	22,478	52.3%
Democratic	Thomas P. Gordon (incumbent)	20,478	47.7%
Total votes		42,956	100%

2016 New Castle County Executive New Castle County Executive election
Party	Candidate	Votes	%	±%
Democratic	Matt Meyer	162,595	66.59%	+2.69%
Republican	Mark Blake	81,578	33.41%	−2.69%
Write-in		32	0.00%	
Total votes		492,635	100%	
Democratic hold				

=== 2020 ===
2020 New Castle County Executive Democratic primary results
Party	Candidate	Votes	%
Democratic	Matt Meyer (incumbent)	43,833	56.5%
Democratic	Maggie Jones	33,735	43.5%
Total votes		77,568	100%

2020 New Castle County Executive election
Party	Candidate	Votes	%	±%
Democratic	Matt Meyer (incumbent)	209,480	99.16%	+32.57%
Write-In	Mike Stewart	1,770	0.84%	+0.84%
Total votes		211,250	100.00%	
Democratic hold				

=== 2024 ===
2024 Delaware gubernatorial Democratic primary results
Party	Candidate	Votes	%
Democratic	Matt Meyer	40,518	46.98%
Democratic	Bethany Hall-Long	31,588	36.62%
Democratic	Collin O'Mara	14,142	16.40%
Total votes		86,248	100.0%

2024 Delaware gubernatorial election
Party	Candidate	Votes	%	±%
Democratic	Matt Meyer	279,585	56.07%	−3.39%
Republican	Mike Ramone	219,050	43.93%	+5.30%
Total votes		498,635	100.00%	
Democratic hold				

Political offices
Preceded by Thomas P. Gordon	Executive of New Castle County; 2017–2025	Succeeded by Marcus Henry
Preceded by Bethany Hall-Long	Governor of Delaware; 2025–present	Incumbent
Party political offices
Preceded by John Carney	Democratic nominee for Governor of Delaware; 2024	Most recent
U.S. order of precedence (ceremonial)
Preceded by JD Vance as Vice President	Order of precedence of the United States; Within Delaware	Succeeded by Mayor of city in which event is held
Preceded by JD Vance as Vice President	Order of precedence of the United States; Within Delaware	Succeeded by Otherwise Mike Johnson as Speaker of the House
Preceded by Darline Graham as United States Senator	Order of precedence of the United States; Outside Delaware	Succeeded by Josh Shapiro as Governor of Pennsylvania
