= List of elections in 2012 =

- 2012 United Nations Security Council election

== Africa ==
=== Egypt ===
- 2011–12 Egyptian parliamentary election
- 2012 Egyptian presidential election

=== Mali ===
- 2012 Malian presidential election
- 2012 Malian parliamentary election

=== Senegal ===
- 2012 Senegalese presidential election
- 2012 Senegalese parliamentary election

=== Sierra Leone ===
- 2012 Sierra Leonean general election

=== Somaliland ===
- 2012 Somaliland municipal elections
- 2012 Somaliland parliamentary election

== Asia ==
- Abkhazia: Abkhazian parliamentary election
- Armenia: Armenian parliamentary election
- Bahrain: Bahraini parliamentary by-election
- People's Republic of China: 12th National People's Congress
- East Timor
  - East Timorese parliamentary election
  - East Timorese presidential election
- Egypt: Egyptian parliamentary election
- Georgia: parliamentary election
- Hong Kong
  - 2012 Hong Kong Chief Executive election
  - 2012 Hong Kong legislative election
- India
  - 2012 Indian presidential election
  - 2012 Indian vice presidential election
  - Legislative Assembly elections in India, 2012
- Indonesian gubernatorial elections, 2012
  - Acehnese gubernatorial election
  - Jakarta gubernatorial election
- Iran: Iranian legislative election
- Japan
  - Japanese general election
  - Kyoto mayoral election
  - Tokyo gubernatorial election
  - Ōarai Mayoral election for the town
- Kuweit
  - general election, February
  - general election, December
- Malaysia: Democratic Action Party leadership election
- Mongolia: legislative election
- Myanmar (Burma): by-elections
- Philippines: Negros Occidental's 5th legislative district special election
- Russia presidential election
- South Korea
  - presidential election
  - legislative election
- Republic of China (Taiwan)
  - presidential election
  - legislative election
- Syria parliamentary election
- Turkmenistan presidential election
- Yemen presidential election

== Europe ==
- Albania: presidential election
- Armenia: parliamentary election
- Belarus: parliamentary election
- Czech Republic:
  - Czech Senate election
  - Czech regional elections
- Finland
  - presidential election
  - municipal election
- France: presidential election
- Germany
  - presidential election
  - Saarland state election
  - Schleswig-Holstein state election
- Georgia: parliamentary election
- Greece
  - May 2012 Greek parliamentary election
  - June 2012 Greek parliamentary election
  - North Rhine-Westphalia state election
- Hungary: presidential election
- Iceland: presidential election
- Italy: 2012 Italian local elections
- Lithuania: parliamentary election
- Malta: 2012 Maltese local elections
- Moldova: presidential election
- Montenegro: parliamentary election
- Romania
  - local election
  - legislative election
- Russia: presidential election
- San Marino: general election
- Serbia
  - local elections
  - presidential election
  - parliamentary election
  - Vojvodina parliamentary election
- Slovakia: parliamentary election
- Slovenia: presidential election
- Spain
  - Andalusian parliamentary election
  - Elections to the General Council of the Principality of Asturias
- Ukraine: parliamentary election
- United Kingdom
  - 2012 United Kingdom local elections
    - 2012 Scottish local elections

== Middle East ==
=== Iran ===
- 2012 Iranian legislative election

== North America ==
=== Mexico ===
- 2012 Mexican presidential election

=== United States ===
- 2012 United States elections

==== Presidential ====
- 2012 United States presidential election

==== Senate ====
- 2012 United States Senate elections
- 2012 United States Senate election in Connecticut
- 2012 United States Senate election in Florida
- 2012 United States Senate election in Indiana
- 2012 United States Senate election in Maryland
- 2012 United States Senate election in Massachusetts
- 2012 United States Senate election in Missouri
- 2012 United States Senate election in Nebraska
- 2012 United States Senate election in Nevada
- 2012 United States Senate election in New Mexico
- 2012 United States Senate election in North Dakota
- 2012 United States Senate election in Ohio
- 2012 United States Senate election in Pennsylvania
- 2012 United States Senate election in Rhode Island
- 2012 United States Senate election in Texas
- 2012 United States Senate election in Utah
- 2012 United States Senate election in Vermont
- 2012 United States Senate election in Virginia
- 2012 United States Senate election in Washington
- 2012 United States Senate election in West Virginia
- 2012 United States Senate election in Wisconsin

==== House of Representatives ====
- 2012 United States House of Representatives elections
- 2012 United States House of Representatives elections in Alabama
- 2012 United States House of Representatives election in Alaska
- 2012 United States House of Representatives elections in Arizona
- 2012 United States House of Representatives elections in Arkansas
- 2012 United States House of Representatives elections in California
- 2012 United States House of Representatives elections in Colorado
- 2012 United States House of Representatives elections in Connecticut
- 2012 United States House of Representatives election in Delaware
- 2012 United States House of Representatives elections in Florida
- 2012 United States House of Representatives elections in Georgia
- 2012 United States House of Representatives elections in Hawaii
- 2012 United States House of Representatives elections in Idaho
- 2012 United States House of Representatives elections in Illinois
- 2012 United States House of Representatives elections in Indiana
- 2012 United States House of Representatives elections in Iowa
- 2012 United States House of Representatives elections in Kansas
- 2012 United States House of Representatives elections in Kentucky
- 2012 United States House of Representatives elections in Louisiana
- 2012 United States House of Representatives elections in Maine
- 2012 United States House of Representatives elections in Maryland
- 2012 United States House of Representatives elections in Massachusetts
- 2012 United States House of Representatives elections in Michigan
- 2012 United States House of Representatives elections in Minnesota
- 2012 United States House of Representatives elections in Mississippi
- 2012 United States House of Representatives elections in Missouri
- 2012 United States House of Representatives election in Montana
- 2012 United States House of Representatives elections in Nebraska
- 2012 United States House of Representatives elections in Nevada
- 2012 United States House of Representatives elections in New Hampshire
- 2012 United States House of Representatives elections in New Jersey
- 2012 United States House of Representatives elections in New Mexico
- 2012 United States House of Representatives elections in New York
- 2012 United States House of Representatives elections in North Carolina
- 2012 United States House of Representatives election in North Dakota
- 2012 United States House of Representatives elections in Ohio
- 2012 United States House of Representatives elections in Oklahoma
- 2012 United States House of Representatives elections in Oregon
- 2012 United States House of Representatives elections in Pennsylvania
- 2012 United States House of Representatives elections in Rhode Island
- 2012 United States House of Representatives elections in South Carolina
- 2012 United States House of Representatives election in South Dakota
- 2012 United States House of Representatives elections in Tennessee
- 2012 United States House of Representatives elections in Texas
- 2012 United States House of Representatives elections in Utah
- 2012 United States House of Representatives election in Vermont
- 2012 United States House of Representatives elections in Virginia
- 2012 United States House of Representatives elections in Washington
- 2012 United States House of Representatives elections in West Virginia
- 2012 United States House of Representatives elections in Wisconsin
- 2012 United States House of Representatives election in Wyoming

==== Lieutenant Gubernatorial ====
- 2012 Delaware lieutenant gubernatorial election
- 2012 Missouri lieutenant gubernatorial election
- 2012 North Carolina lieutenant gubernatorial election
- 2012 Vermont lieutenant gubernatorial election
- 2012 Washington lieutenant gubernatorial election
- 2012 Wisconsin lieutenant gubernatorial recall election

==== Gubernatorial ====
- 2012 American Samoa gubernatorial election
- 2012 Delaware gubernatorial election
- 2012 Indiana gubernatorial election
- 2012 Missouri gubernatorial election
- 2012 Montana gubernatorial election
- 2012 New Hampshire gubernatorial election
- 2012 North Carolina gubernatorial election
- 2012 North Dakota gubernatorial election
- 2012 Puerto Rico gubernatorial election
- 2012 United States gubernatorial elections
- 2012 Utah gubernatorial election
- 2012 Washington gubernatorial election
- 2012 Wisconsin gubernatorial recall election

==== Mayoral ====
- 2012 Anchorage mayoral election
- 2012 Austin mayoral election
- 2012 Bakersfield, California, mayoral election
- 2012 Baton Rouge mayoral election
- 2012 Burlington, Vermont mayoral election
- 2012 Cheyenne mayoral election
- 2012 Corpus Christi mayoral election
- 2012 Fort Lauderdale mayoral election
- 2012 Fresno mayoral election
- 2012 Glendale, Arizona, mayoral election
- 2012 Honolulu mayoral election
- 2012 Irvine mayoral election
- 2012 Lubbock mayoral election
- 2012 Miami-Dade County mayoral election
- 2012 Milwaukee mayoral election
- 2012 Orlando mayoral election
- 2012 Portland, Oregon, mayoral election
- 2012 Riverside, California, mayoral election
- 2012 Sacramento mayoral election
- 2012 Salt Lake County mayoral election
- 2012 San Diego mayoral election
- 2012 Stockton, California, mayoral election
- 2012 Wilmington mayoral election

== Central America ==
=== Dominican Republic ===
- 2012 Dominican Republic presidential election

== Oceania ==
=== Australia ===
- 2012 Australian Capital Territory election
- 2012 Northern Territory general election
- 2012 Queensland state election
- further elections

== South America ==
=== Brazil ===
- 2012 Brazilian municipal elections

=== Venezuela ===
- presidential election
- regional elections

== See also ==
- List of presidential elections in 2012
