= 2012 Delaware House of Representatives election =

- November 6, 2012

All 41 seats in the Delaware House of Representatives 21 seats needed for a majority
- Turnout: 65%
	Majority party	Minority party
Leader	Robert Gilligan (retired)	Gregory Lavelle (retired)
Party	Democratic	Republican
Leader's seat	19th - Wilmington	12th (Note: Redistricted from the 11th district.) - Wilmington
Last election	26	15
Seats before	26	15
Seats won	27	14
Seat change	▲1	▼1
Popular vote	220,822	130,711
Percentage	62.22%	36.83%
- House results by district Democratic hold Democratic gain Republican hold
Speaker before election
Robert Gilligan
Democratic
Elected Speaker
Peter Schwartzkopf
Democratic

An election was held on November 6, 2012, to elect all 41 members to Delaware's House of Representatives. The election coincided with the elections for other offices, including for U.S. President, Governor, Lieutenant Governor, U.S. Senate, U.S. House of Representatives, and state senate. The primary election was held on September 11, 2012.

== Overview ==
=== Open seats ===
District 1: Democratic incumbent Dennis P. Williams is running for mayor of Wilmington.

District 11: Republican incumbent and Minority Leader Greg Lavelle is running for the 4th district state Senate seat.

District 19: Democratic incumbent and Speaker of the House Robert Gilligan is retiring.

District 20: This is a new seat, with no current incumbent.

District 23: Democratic incumbent Teresa Schooley is retiring.

District 32: Democratic incumbent E. Bradford "Brad" Bennett is retiring.

District 38: Republican incumbent Gerald Hocker is running for the 20th district state Senate seat.

District 40: Republican incumbent Biff Lee is retiring.

== Results ==
District	Incumbent	Party	Elected Representative	Party
1st	Dennis Williams	Dem	Charles Potter Jr.	Dem
2nd	Stephanie Bolden	Dem	Stephanie Bolden	Dem
3rd	Helene Keeley	Dem	Helene Keeley	Dem
4th	Gerald Brady	Dem	Gerald Brady	Dem
5th	Melanie George Smith	Dem	Melanie George Smith	Dem
6th	Debra Heffernan	Dem	Debra Heffernan	Dem
7th	Bryon Short	Dem	Bryon Short	Dem
8th	Quinn Johnson	Dem	Quinn Johnson	Dem
9th	Rebecca Walker	Dem	Rebecca Walker	Dem
10th	Dennis Williams	Dem	Dennis Williams	Dem
11th	New Seat		Jeffrey Spiegelman	Rep
12th	Deborah Hudson	Rep	Deborah Hudson	Rep
12th	Gregory Lavelle (Note: Redistricted from the 11th district.)	Rep	Deborah Hudson	Rep
13th	Larry Mitchell	Dem	Larry Mitchell	Dem
14th	Peter Schwartzkopf	Dem	Peter Schwartzkopf	Dem
15th	Valerie Longhurst	Dem	Valerie Longhurst	Dem
16th	J.J. Johnson	Dem	J.J. Johnson	Dem
17th	Michael Mulrooney	Dem	Michael Mulrooney	Dem
18th	Michael Barbieri	Dem	Michael Barbieri	Dem
19th	Robert Gilligan	Dem	Kimberly Williams	Dem
20th	New Seat		Stephen Smyk	Rep
21st	Michael Ramone	Rep	Michael Ramone	Rep
22nd	Joseph Miró	Rep	Joseph Miró	Rep
22nd	Nick Manolakos (Note: Redistricted from the 20th district.)	Rep	Joseph Miró	Rep
23rd	Teresa Schooley	Dem	Paul Baumbach	Dem
24th	Edward Osienski	Dem	Edward Osienski	Dem
25th	John Kowalko Jr.	Dem	John Kowalko Jr.	Dem
26th	John Viola	Dem	John Viola	Dem
27th	Earl Jaques Jr.	Dem	Earl Jaques Jr.	Dem
28th	William Carson Jr.	Dem	William Carson Jr.	Dem
29th	Lincoln Willis	Rep	Charles Paradee	Dem
30th	William Outten	Rep	William Outten	Rep
31st	Darryl Scott	Dem	Darryl Scott	Dem
32nd	Brad Bennett	Dem	Andria Bennett	Dem
33rd	Harold Peterman	Rep	Harold Peterman	Rep
34th	Donald Blakey	Rep	Donald Blakey	Rep
35th	David Wilson	Rep	David Wilson	Rep
36th	Harvey Kenton	Rep	Harvey Kenton	Rep
37th	Ruth Briggs King	Rep	Ruth Briggs King	Rep
38th	Gerald Hocker	Rep	Ronald Gray	Rep
39th	Daniel Short	Rep	Daniel Short	Rep
40th	Clifford Lee	Rep	Timothy Dukes	Rep
41st	John Atkins	Dem	John Atkins	Dem

=== Statewide ===
Party	Candi- dates	Votes	%	Seats	+/–
Democratic	35	220,822	62.22%	27	▲1
Republican	26	130,711	36.83%	14	▼1
Libertarian	7	3,116	0.88%	0	Steady
Independent	1	268	0.08%	0	Steady
Total	69	354,917	100%	41	Steady

== Predictions ==
Source	Ranking	As of
Governing	Safe D	October 24, 2012

== Detailed Results ==
Results of the 2012 Delaware House of Representatives election by district:

=== District 1 ===
Incumbent Democrat Dennis Williams has represented the 1st district since 1994. Williams retired to run for Mayor of Wilmington and fellow Democrat Charles Potter Jr. won the open seat. Democratic primary

Delaware House of Representatives 1st district Democratic primary election, 2012
Party	Candidate	Votes	%
Democratic	Charles Potter Jr.	2,546	63.91%
Democratic	Rourke Moore	941	23.62%
Democratic	Victoria Kent	497	12.47%
Total votes		3,984	100%

General election

Delaware House of Representatives 1st district general election, 2012
Party	Candidate	Votes	%
Democratic	Charles Potter Jr.	9,321	100%
Total votes		9,321	100%
Democratic hold			

=== District 2 ===
Incumbent Democrat Stephanie Bolden has represented the 2nd district since 2010. Democratic primary

Delaware House of Representatives 2nd district Democratic primary election, 2012
Party	Candidate	Votes	%
Democratic	Stephanie Bolden (incumbent)	1,400	62.11%
Democratic	Arthur Scott	854	37.89%
Total votes		2,254	100%

General election

Delaware House of Representatives 2nd district general election, 2012
Party	Candidate	Votes	%
Democratic	Stephanie Bolden (incumbent)	6,253	100%
Total votes		6,253	100%
Democratic hold			

=== District 3 ===
Incumbent Democrat Helene Keeley has represented the 3rd district and its predecessors since 1996.

Delaware House of Representatives 3rd district general election, 2012
Party	Candidate	Votes	%
Democratic	Helene Keeley (incumbent)	6,341	100%
Total votes		6,341	100%
Democratic hold			

=== District 4 ===
Incumbent Democrat Gerald Brady has represented the 4th district since 2006.

Delaware House of Representatives 4th district general election, 2012
Party	Candidate	Votes	%
Democratic	Gerald Brady (incumbent)	9,133	100%
Total votes		9,133	100%
Democratic hold			

=== District 5 ===
Incumbent Democrat Melanie George Smith has represented the 5th district since 2002.

Delaware House of Representatives 5th district general election, 2012
Party	Candidate	Votes	%
Democratic	Melanie George Smith (incumbent)	8,057	100%
Total votes		8,057	100%
Democratic hold			

=== District 6 ===
Incumbent Democrat Debra Heffernan has represented the 6th district since 2010.

Delaware House of Representatives 6th district general election, 2012
Party	Candidate	Votes	%
Democratic	Debra Heffernan (incumbent)	7,502	62.36%
Republican	Eric Taylor	4,529	37.64%
Total votes		12,031	100%
Democratic hold			

=== District 7 ===
Incumbent Democrat Bryon Short has represented the 7th district since 2006.

Delaware House of Representatives 7th district general election, 2012
Party	Candidate	Votes	%
Democratic	Bryon Short (incumbent)	7,280	68.22%
Republican	Daniel Lepre	3,204	30.02%
Libertarian	C. Robert Wilson	188	1.76%
Total votes		10,672	100%
Democratic hold			

=== District 8 ===
Incumbent Democrat Quinn Johnson has represented the 8th district since 2008.

Delaware House of Representatives 8th district general election, 2012
Party	Candidate	Votes	%
Democratic	Quinn Johnson (incumbent)	6,937	69.21%
Republican	Matthew Brown	3,086	30.79%
Total votes		10,023	100%
Democratic hold			

=== District 9 ===
Incumbent Democrat Rebecca Walker has represented the 9th district since 2010.

Delaware House of Representatives 9th district general election, 2012
Party	Candidate	Votes	%
Democratic	Rebecca Walker (incumbent)	7,565	100%
Total votes		7,565	100%
Democratic hold			

=== District 10 ===
Incumbent Democrat Dennis Williams has represented the 10th district since 2008. Democratic primary

Delaware House of Representatives 10th district Democratic primary election, 2012
Party	Candidate	Votes	%
Democratic	Dennis Williams (incumbent)	705	52.81%
Democratic	Sean Matthews	630	47.19%
Total votes		1,335	100%

General election

Delaware House of Representatives 10th district general election, 2012
Party	Candidate	Votes	%
Democratic	Dennis Williams (incumbent)	5,553	52.11%
Republican	Robert Rhodunda	5,104	47.89%
Total votes		10,657	100%
Democratic hold			

=== District 11 ===
The new 11th district is an open seat which strectches from Townsend to Chapeltown and has no incumbent. Republican Jeffrey Spiegelman won the open seat. Democratic primary

Delaware House of Representatives 11th district Democratic primary election, 2012
Party	Candidate	Votes	%
Democratic	Lynne Newlin	565	66.71%
Democratic	David Brown Jr.	282	33.29%
Total votes		847	100%

General election

Delaware House of Representatives 11th district general election, 2012
Party	Candidate	Votes	%
Republican	Jeffrey Spiegelman	4,337	50.32%
Democratic	Lynne Newlin	4,127	47.89%
Libertarian	Margaret McKeown	154	1.79%
Total votes		8,618	100%
Republican win (new seat)			

=== District 12 ===
The new 12th district includes the homes of incumbent Republicans Deborah Hudson, who has represented the 12th district since 1994, and Gregory Lavelle, who has represented the 11th district since 2001. Lavelle retired to run for the State Senate, while Hudson was re-elected here.

Delaware House of Representatives 12th district general election, 2012
Party	Candidate	Votes	%
Republican	Deborah Hudson (incumbent)	9,669	100%
Total votes		9,669	100%
Republican hold			

=== District 13 ===
Incumbent Democrat Larry Mitchell has represented the 13th district since 2006.

Delaware House of Representatives 13th district general election, 2012
Party	Candidate	Votes	%
Democratic	Larry Mitchell (incumbent)	7,384	100%
Total votes		7,384	100%
Democratic hold			

=== District 14 ===
Incumbent Democratic Majority Leader Peter Schwartzkopf has represented the 14th district since 2002.

Delaware House of Representatives 14th district general election, 2012
Party	Candidate	Votes	%
Democratic	Peter Schwartzkopf (incumbent)	8,250	89.92%
Libertarian	Margaret Melson	925	10.08%
Total votes		9,175	100%
Democratic hold			

=== District 15 ===
Incumbent Democrat Valerie Longhurst has represented the 15th district since 2004. Democratic primary

Delaware House of Representatives 15th district Democratic primary election, 2012
Party	Candidate	Votes	%
Democratic	Valerie Longhurst (incumbent)	665	57.93%
Democratic	James Burton	483	42.07%
Total votes		1,148	100%

General election

Delaware House of Representatives 15th district general election, 2012
Party	Candidate	Votes	%
Democratic	Valerie Longhurst (incumbent)	8,385	93.48%
Libertarian	Amy Merlino	585	6.52%
Total votes		8,970	100%
Democratic hold			

=== District 16 ===
Incumbent Democrat J.J. Johnson has represented the 16th district since 2004.

Delaware House of Representatives 16th district general election, 2012
Party	Candidate	Votes	%
Democratic	J.J. Johnson (incumbent)	7,613	96.49%
Libertarian	John Machurek	277	3.51%
Total votes		7,890	100%
Democratic hold			

=== District 17 ===
Incumbent Democrat Michael Mulrooney has represented the 17th district since 1998.

Delaware House of Representatives 17th district general election, 2012
Party	Candidate	Votes	%
Democratic	Michael Mulrooney (incumbent)	7,297	81.15%
Republican	Laura Brown	1,695	18.85%
Total votes		8,992	100%
Democratic hold			

=== District 18 ===
Incumbent Democrat Michael Barbieri has represented the 18th district since 2008.

Delaware House of Representatives 18th district general election, 2012
Party	Candidate	Votes	%
Democratic	Michael Barbieri (incumbent)	7,501	100%
Total votes		7,501	100%
Democratic hold			

=== District 19 ===
Incumbent Democratic House Speaker Robert Gilligan has represented the 19th district since 1972. Gilligan didn't seek re-election and fellow Democrat Kimberly Williams won the open seat. Democratic primary

Delaware House of Representatives 19th district Democratic primary election, 2012
Party	Candidate	Votes	%
Democratic	Kimberly Williams	710	54.28%
Democratic	William Dunn	598	45.72%
Total votes		1,308	100%

General election

Delaware House of Representatives 19th district general election, 2012
Party	Candidate	Votes	%
Democratic	Kimberly Williams	6,088	65.55%
Republican	Dennis Cini	3,200	34.45%
Total votes		9,288	100%
Democratic hold			

=== District 20 ===
The new 20th district is based in Sussex County and has no incumbent. Republican Stephen Smyk won the open seat. Democratic primary

Delaware House of Representatives 20th district Democratic primary election, 2012
Party	Candidate	Votes	%
Democratic	M. Marie Mayor	1,177	64.88%
Democratic	Lynn Rogers	525	28.94%
Democratic	Thomas Jones Sr.	112	6.17%
Total votes		1,814	100%

General election

Delaware House of Representatives 20th district general election, 2012
Party	Candidate	Votes	%
Republican	Stephen Smyk	6,469	53.21%
Democratic	M. Marie Mayor	5,689	46.79%
Total votes		12,158	100%
Republican win (new seat)			

=== District 21 ===
Incumbent Republican Michael Ramone has represented the 21st district since 2008.

Delaware House of Representatives 21st district general election, 2012
Party	Candidate	Votes	%
Republican	Michael Ramone (incumbent)	7,629	100%
Total votes		7,629	100%
Republican hold			

=== District 22 ===
The new 22nd district includes the homes of incumbent Republicans Joseph Miró, who has represented the 22nd district since 1998, and Nick Manolakos, who has represented the 20th district since 2006. Miró defeated Manolakos in the Republican primary and went on to win the general election. Republican primary

Delaware House of Representatives 22nd district Republican primary election, 2012
Party	Candidate	Votes	%
Republican	Joseph Miró (incumbent)	977	60.80%
Republican	Nick Manolakos (incumbent)	630	39.20%
Total votes		1,607	100%

General election

Delaware House of Representatives 22nd district general election, 2012
Party	Candidate	Votes	%
Republican	Joseph Miró (incumbent)	8,333	63.44%
Democratic	David Ellis	4,803	36.56%
Total votes		13,136	100%
Republican hold			

=== District 23 ===
Incumbent Democrat Teresa Schooley has represented the 23rd district since 2004. Schooley didn't seek re-election and fellow Democrat Paul Baumbach won the open seat. Democratic primary

Delaware House of Representatives 23rd district Democratic primary election, 2012
Party	Candidate	Votes	%
Democratic	Paul Baumbach	546	38.86%
Democratic	Gerald Grant Jr.	491	34.95%
Democratic	Claudia Bock	368	26.19%
Total votes		1,405	100%

General election

Delaware House of Representatives 23rd district general election, 2012
Party	Candidate	Votes	%
Democratic	Paul Baumbach	4,770	57.27%
Republican	Mark Doughty	3,559	42.73%
Total votes		8,329	100%
Democratic hold			

=== District 24 ===
Incumbent Democrat Edward Osienski has represented the 24th district since 2010.

Delaware House of Representatives 24th district general election, 2012
Party	Candidate	Votes	%
Democratic	Edward Osienski (incumbent)	7,445	100%
Total votes		7,445	100%
Democratic hold			

=== District 25 ===
Incumbent Democrat John Kowalko Jr. has represented the 25th district since 2006.

Delaware House of Representatives 25th district general election, 2012
Party	Candidate	Votes	%
Democratic	John Kowalko Jr. (incumbent)	5,674	100%
Total votes		5,674	100%
Democratic hold			

=== District 26 ===
Incumbent Democrat John Viola has represented the 26th district since 1998.

Delaware House of Representatives 26th district general election, 2012
Party	Candidate	Votes	%
Democratic	John Viola (incumbent)	7,476	100%
Total votes		7,476	100%
Democratic hold			

=== District 27 ===
Incumbent Democrat Earl Jaques Jr. has represented the 27th district since 2008.

Delaware House of Representatives 27th district general election, 2012
Party	Candidate	Votes	%
Democratic	Earl Jaques Jr. (incumbent)	8,581	100%
Total votes		8,581	100%
Democratic hold			

=== District 28 ===
Incumbent Democrat William Carson Jr. has represented the 28th district since 2008.

Delaware House of Representatives 28th district general election, 2012
Party	Candidate	Votes	%
Democratic	William Carson Jr. (incumbent)	6,104	71.13%
Republican	Christopher Sylvester	2,478	28.87%
Total votes		8,582	100%
Democratic hold			

=== District 29 ===
Incumbent Republican Lincoln Willis has represented the 29th district since 2010. Willis lost re-election to Democrat Charles Paradee.

Delaware House of Representatives 29th district general election, 2012
Party	Candidate	Votes	%
Democratic	Charles Paradee	5,183	54.32%
Republican	Lincoln Willis (incumbent)	4,358	45.68%
Total votes		9,541	100%
Democratic gain from Republican			

=== District 30 ===
Incumbent Republican William Outten has represented the 30th district since 2004.

Delaware House of Representatives 30th district general election, 2012
Party	Candidate	Votes	%
Republican	William Outten (incumbent)	5,906	91.91%
Libertarian	Gordon Smith	520	8.09%
Total votes		6,426	100%
Republican hold			

=== District 31 ===
Incumbent Democrat Darryl Scott has represented the 31st district since 2008.

Delaware House of Representatives 31st district general election, 2012
Party	Candidate	Votes	%
Democratic	Darryl Scott (incumbent)	5,231	62.63%
Republican	Samuel Chick	3,121	37.37%
Total votes		8,352	100%
Democratic hold			

=== District 32 ===
Incumbent Democrat Brad Bennett has represented the 32nd district since 2008. Bennett didn't seek re-election and his wife Andria Bennett won the open seat. Democratic primary

Delaware House of Representatives 32nd district Democratic primary election, 2012
Party	Candidate	Votes	%
Democratic	Andria Bennett	421	61.64%
Democratic	William McGlumphy	262	38.36%
Total votes		683	100%

Republican primary

Delaware House of Representatives 32nd district Republican primary election, 2012
Party	Candidate	Votes	%
Republican	Ellis Parrott	295	73.57%
Republican	William McVay	106	26.43%
Total votes		401	100%

General election

Delaware House of Representatives 32nd district general election, 2012
Party	Candidate	Votes	%
Democratic	Andria Bennett	4,097	63.33%
Republican	Ellis Parrott	2,372	36.67%
Total votes		6,469	100%
Democratic hold			

=== District 33 ===
Incumbent Republican Harold Peterman has represented the 33rd district since 2010.

Delaware House of Representatives 33rd district general election, 2012
Party	Candidate	Votes	%
Republican	Harold Peterman (incumbent)	4,825	53.42%
Democratic	John Robbins	4,207	46.58%
Total votes		9,032	100%
Republican hold			

=== District 34 ===
Incumbent Republican Donald Blakey has represented the 34th district since 2006.

Delaware House of Representatives 34th district general election, 2012
Party	Candidate	Votes	%
Republican	Donald Blakey (incumbent)	5,680	56.68%
Democratic	Theodore Yacucci	4,074	40.65%
Independent Party	Douglas Beatty	268	2.67%
Total votes		10,022	100%
Republican hold			

=== District 35 ===
Incumbent Republican David Wilson has represented the 35th district since 2008.

Delaware House of Representatives 35th district general election, 2012
Party	Candidate	Votes	%
Republican	David Wilson (incumbent)	5,836	92.59%
Libertarian	Ronnie Fitzgerald Jr.	467	7.41%
Total votes		6,303	100%
Republican hold			

=== District 36 ===
Incumbent Republican Harvey Kenton has represented the 36th district since 2010.

Delaware House of Representatives 36th district general election, 2012
Party	Candidate	Votes	%
Republican	Harvey Kenton (incumbent)	6,298	100%
Total votes		6,298	100%
Republican hold			

=== District 37 ===
Incumbent Republican Ruth Briggs King has represented the th district since 2009.

Delaware House of Representatives 37th district general election, 2012
Party	Candidate	Votes	%
Republican	Ruth Briggs King (incumbent)	5,026	54.84%
Democratic	Elizabeth McGinn	4,139	45.16%
Total votes		9,165	100%
Republican hold			

=== District 38 ===
Incumbent Republican Gerald Hocker has represented the 38th district since 2002. Hocker retired to run for the State Senate and fellow Republican Ronald Gray won the open seat.

Delaware House of Representatives 38th district general election, 2012
Party	Candidate	Votes	%
Republican	Ronald Gray	7,902	61.08%
Democratic	Shirley Price	5,035	38.92%
Total votes		12,937	100%
Republican hold			

=== District 39 ===
Incumbent Republican Daniel Short has represented the 39th district since 2006. Republican primary

Delaware House of Representatives 39th district Republican primary election, 2012
Party	Candidate	Votes	%
Republican	Daniel Short (incumbent)	1,046	80.15%
Republican	Patrick Murray	259	19.85%
Total votes		1,305	100%

General election

Delaware House of Representatives 39th district general election, 2012
Party	Candidate	Votes	%
Republican	Daniel Short (incumbent)	6,191	100%
Total votes		6,191	100%
Republican hold			

=== District 40 ===
Incumbent Republican Clifford Lee has represented the 40th district since 1990. Lee didn't seek re-election and fellow Republican Timothy Dukes won the open seat. Democratic primary

Delaware House of Representatives 40th district Democratic primary election, 2012
Party	Candidate	Votes	%
Democratic	Benjamin Lowe	416	65.41%
Democratic	Raymond Adkins	220	34.59%
Total votes		636	100%

General election

Delaware House of Representatives 40th district general election, 2012
Party	Candidate	Votes	%
Republican	Timothy Dukes	5,552	62.68%
Democratic	Benjamin Lowe	3,306	37.32%
Total votes		8,858	100%
Republican hold			

=== District 41 ===
Incumbent Democrat John Atkins has represented the 41st district since 2008.

Delaware House of Representatives 41st district general election, 2012
Party	Candidate	Votes	%
Democratic	John Atkins (incumbent)	4,421	50.39%
Republican	Richard Collins	4,352	49.61%
Total votes		8,773	100%
Democratic hold			
