= 2012 Delaware elections =

- November 6, 2012

Delaware's 2012 general elections were held on November 6, 2012. Primary elections were held on September 11, 2012.

== Federal ==
=== Senate ===
Incumbent Democratic U.S. Senator Tom Carper, who has held the position since 2001, is running for re-election. Keith Spanarelli, a businessman, is challenging Carper in the Democratic primary.

Kevin Wade, a businessman, is seeking the Republican nomination.

Andrew Groff, a businessman, is running as the nominee of the Green Party. Groff has also been endorsed by the Libertarian Party. Alex Pires, a businessman and attorney, is running as the nominee of the Independent Party of Delaware.

=== House of Representatives ===
Incumbent Democratic U.S. Representative John Carney, who has held the position since 2011, is running for re-election.

Rose Izzo, a housewife and unsuccessful Republican primary candidate for the seat in 2010, and Tom Kovach, the president of the New Castle County Council, are seeking the Republican nomination to challenge Carney.

Bernie August is running as the nominee of the Green Party. Scott Gesty, an accountant, is running as the nominee of the Libertarian Party. Gesty has also been endorsed by the Independent Party of Delaware.

== State ==
=== Constitutional officers ===
==== Governor ====
Incumbent Democratic Governor Jack Markell, who has held the position since 2009, is running for re-election.

Jeff Cragg, a businessman, is seeking the Republican nomination to challenge Markell.

==== Lieutenant governor ====
Democratic incumbent Matt Denn, who has held the position of Lieutenant Governor of Delaware since 2009, is running for re-election.

Sher Valenzuela, a businesswoman, is seeking the Republican nomination to challenge Denn.

Margie Waite-McKeown is running as the nominee of the Libertarian Party.

==== Insurance Commissioner ====
Insurance Commissioner results by county: Stewart: 50–60%; 60–70%; Mobley: 40–50%

Democratic incumbent Karen Weldin Stewart, who has held the position of Insurance Commissioner of Delaware since 2009, is running for re-election. Mitch Crane, a lawyer, former judge, and former acting director of the Consumer Services and Investigations under Stewart; Paul Gallagher, an insurance agent; and Dennis Spivack, a former deputy state attorney general and Democratic nominee for the at-large congressional seat in 2006, are challenging Stewart in the Democratic primary. Crane has received the endorsement of the Delaware Democratic Party.

David Eisenhour is running as the nominee of the Libertarian Party.

=== General Assembly ===
==== Senate ====
Because of redistricting, all 21 members of the Delaware Senate are up for election. The state Senate currently consists of 14 Democrats and 7 Republicans.

==== House of Representatives ====
All 41 members of the Delaware House of Representatives are up for election. The state House currently consists of 26 Democrats and 15 Republicans.
