= Delaware's 20th Senate district =

American legislative district

Delaware's 20th State Senate district
Senator
Gerald Hocker; R–Ocean View
- Registration: 44.3% Republican; 33.2% Democratic; 22.5% No party preference
- Demographics: 79% White; 9% Black; 7% Hispanic; 1% Asian; 1% Native American; 3% Other
- Population (2018): 48,045
- Registered voters: 38,245

Delaware's 20th Senate district is one of 21 districts in the Delaware Senate. It has been represented by Republican Gerald Hocker, the current Senate Minority Leader, since 2012.

== Geography ==
District 20 is based in southeastern Sussex County along the Atlantic Ocean, including the communities of Millsboro, Selbyville, Ocean View, Bethany Beach, Dagsboro, Frankford, Fenwick Island, Millville, South Bethany, Roxana, and Oak Orchard. It borders the state of Maryland.

Like all districts in the state, the 20th Senate district is located entirely within Delaware's at-large congressional district. It overlaps with the 37th, 38th, and 41st districts of the Delaware House of Representatives.

== Recent election results ==
Delaware Senators are elected to staggered four-year terms. Under normal circumstances, the 20th district holds elections in presidential years, except immediately after redistricting, when all seats are up for election regardless of usual cycle.

=== 2020 ===
2020 Delaware Senate election, District 20
Party	Candidate	Votes	%
Republican	Gerald Hocker (incumbent)	24,001	100
Total votes		24,001	100
Republican hold			

=== 2016 ===
2016 Delaware Senate election, District 20
Party	Candidate	Votes	%
Republican	Gerald Hocker (incumbent)	17,908	72.4
Democratic	Perry Mitchell	6,831	27.6
Total votes		24,739	100
Republican hold			

=== 2012 ===
2012 Delaware Senate election, District 20
Party	Candidate	Votes	%
Republican	Gerald Hocker	14,290	68.0
Democratic	Richard Eakle	6,736	32.0
Total votes		21,026	100
Republican gain from Democratic			

=== Federal and statewide results ===
Year	Office	Results
2020	President	Trump 57.8 – 41.2%
2016	President	Trump 62.2 – 34.6%
2014	Senate	Wade 58.0 – 40.6%
2012	President	Romney 58.4 – 40.5%
2012	Senate	Carper 50.8 – 42.9%
2012	Governor	Markell 55.7 – 42.2%
