= George Bunting (Delaware politician) =

American politician (1944–2026)

Member of the Delaware Senate from the 20th district
- In office 1996–2013

Personal details
- Born: November 20, 1944 Salisbury, Maryland, U.S.
- Died: February 12, 2026 (aged 81) Bethany Beach, Delaware, U.S.
- Party: Democratic
- Education: University of Delaware

George Howard Bunting Jr. (November 20, 1944 – February 12, 2026) was an American politician from the Delaware Democratic Party. He represented District 20 in the Delaware State Senate from 1996 to 2013 and previously served in the Delaware House of Representatives from 1982 to 1984 and from 1986 to 1996. He was born in Salisbury, Maryland.

Bunting retired at the 2012 Delaware House of Representatives election. He died at his home in Bethany Beach, Delaware, on February 12, 2026, at the age of 81.
