= 2014 United States House of Representatives election in Delaware =

2014 United States House of Representatives election in Delaware, At-large district
- November 4, 2014
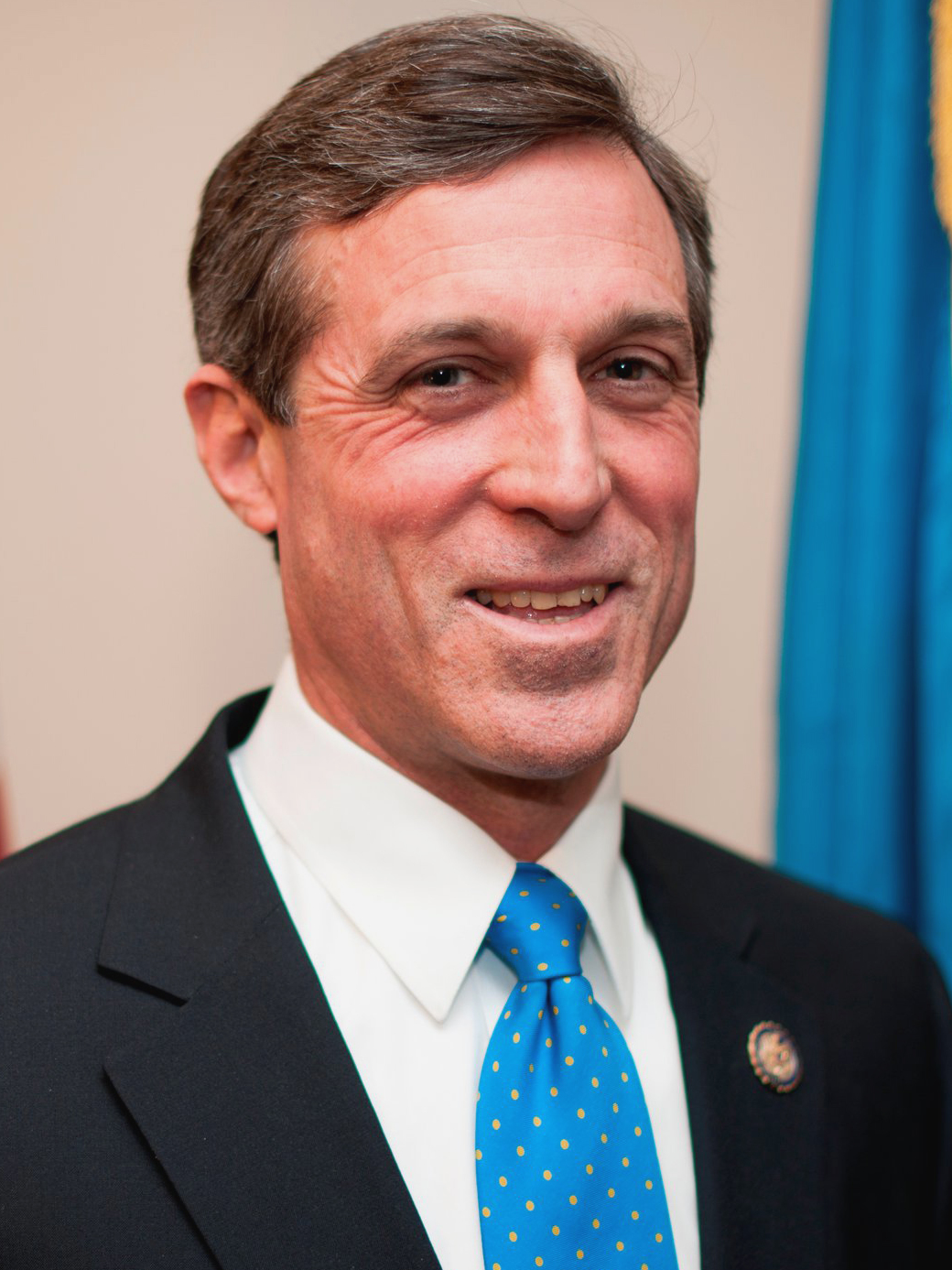

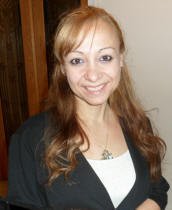
Nominee	John Carney	Rose Izzo
Party	Democratic	Republican
Popular vote	137,251	85,146
Percentage	59.26%	36.76%
- Carney: 40–50% 50–60% 60–70% 70–80% 80–90% Izzo: 40–50% 50–60%
U.S. Representative before election
John Carney
Democratic
Elected U.S. Representative
John Carney
Democratic

The 2014 United States House of Representatives election in Delaware was held on Tuesday, November 4, 2014, to elect the U.S. representative from Delaware's at-large congressional district, who will represent the state of Delaware in the 114th United States Congress. The election coincided with the election of a U.S. Senator from Delaware and other federal and state offices. Incumbent Democratic Congressman John Carney won re-election to a third term in office.

== Democratic nomination ==
=== Candidates ===
==== Declared ====
- John Carney, incumbent U.S. Representative

== Republican nomination ==
=== Candidates ===
==== Declared ====
- Rose Izzo, conservative freelance political consultant and candidate for the seat in 2010 and 2012

== Other candidates ==
=== Green ===
==== Nominee ====
- Bernard "Bernie" August, nominee for the seat in 2012

=== Libertarian ===
==== Nominee ====
- Scott Gesty, accountant and nominee for the seat in 2012

== General election ==
=== Polling ===
Poll source	Date(s) administered	Sample size	Margin of error	John Carney (D)	Rose Izzo (R)	Bernie August (G)	Scott Gesty (L)	Undecided
University of Delaware	September 10–22, 2014	902	± 3.9%	52%	17%	4%	7%	20%

==== Predictions ====
Source	Ranking	As of
The Cook Political Report	Safe D	November 3, 2014
Rothenberg	Safe D	October 24, 2014
Sabato's Crystal Ball	Safe D	October 30, 2014
RCP	Safe D	November 2, 2014
Daily Kos Elections	Safe D	November 4, 2014

=== Results ===
Delaware's at-large congressional district, 2014
Party	Candidate	Votes	%	±%
Democratic	John Carney (incumbent)	137,251	59.26%	−5.14%
Republican	Rose Izzo	85,146	36.76%	+3.32%
Green	Bernard August	4,801	2.07%	+0.97%
Libertarian	Scott Gesty	4,419	1.91%	+0.85%
Total votes		'231,617'	'100.0%'	N/A
Democratic hold				

==== By county ====
County	John Carney Democratic		Rose Izzo Republican		All Others	
County	#	%	#	%	#	%
New Castle	87,240	66.27%	38,574	29.3%	5,829	4.42%
Kent	20,546	52.6%	17,030	43.6%	1,486	3.8%
Sussex	29,465	48.37%	29,542	48.5%	1,905	3.13%
Totals	137,251	59.26%	85,146	36.76%	9,220	3.98%

Counties that flipped from Democratic to Republican

- Sussex (largest city: Seaford)
