= Trinidad Navarro =

American politician

Insurance Commissioner of Delaware
- Incumbent
- Assumed office January 17, 2017
- Governor: John Carney; Bethany Hall-Long; Matt Meyer
- Preceded by: Karen Weldin Stewart

Personal details
- Party: Democratic
- Education: Delaware Technical Community College (AA); Wilmington University (BA)

Trinidad Navarro is an American politician who is the Delaware Insurance Commissioner and previously served as New Castle County Sheriff. He is a Democrat.

== Education and career ==
Navarro received his associate's degree from Delaware Technical Community College. He later earned a BA from Wilmington University and served as a police officer for New Castle County for over 20 years. In 2010, he was elected New Castle County Sheriff.

=== State Insurance Commissioner ===
In 2016, Navarro defeated incumbent Democrat Karen Weldin Stewart in the primary election for state insurance commissioner, earning 55 percent of the vote. He went on to win the general election with 60 percent of the vote against Republican Jeffrey Cragg. In 2020, he was reelected to a second consecutive term in office.

== Harassment allegations ==
In October 2019, a federal lawsuit filed against Navarro by Delaware Department of Insurance employee Fleur McKendell alleged that she had been a victim of workplace sexual and racial discrimination. Included in the suit are claims that Navarro inappropriately touched McKendell's cornrows and made comments about her height and weight. A second lawsuit alleging harassment was filed against Navarro by an employee in January 2020.

In 2022, the state government paid $440,000 to settle McKenndell's lawsuits against Navarro and his administration. In June 2024, after a week-long trial, a federal jury found that Navarro had not engaged in misconduct in a separate lawsuit filed against him by another former worker.

Political offices
Preceded by Karen Weldin Stewart	Insurance Commissioner of Delaware; 2017–present	Incumbent
