= Karen Stewart =

Karen Stewart may refer to:

- Karen B. Stewart (born 1952), American diplomat
- Karen Weldin Stewart, American politician
