= 2004 Delaware lieutenant gubernatorial election =

2004 Delaware Lieutenant gubernatorial election
- November 2, 2004
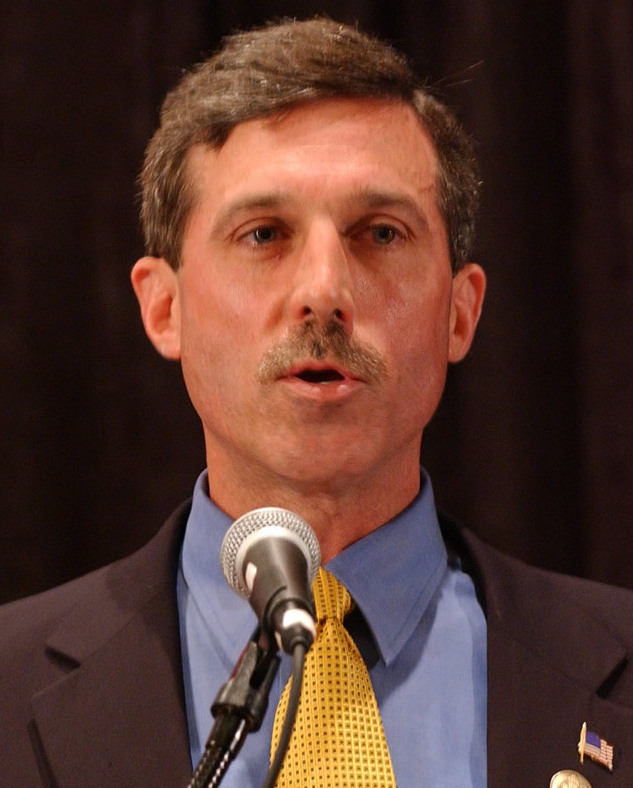

Nominee	John Carney	James Ursomarso
Party	Democratic	Republican
Popular vote	218,442	127,501
Percentage	62.1%	36.3%
- Carney: 50–60% 60–70% 70–80% 80–90%
Lieutenant Governor before election
John Carney Jr.
Democratic
Elected Lieutenant Governor
John Carney Jr.
Democratic

The 2004 Delaware lieutenant gubernatorial election was held on November 2, 2004, coinciding with the Delaware gubernatorial election. Democratic nominee and incumbent Lieutenant Governor of Delaware John Carney was reelected lieutenant governor over Republican nominee James P. Ursomarso in a landslide.

== Candidates ==
=== Democratic Party ===
- John Carney Jr., Lieutenant Governor of Delaware

=== Republican Party ===
- James P. Ursomarso

=== Independent Party of Delaware ===
- Michael Robert Dore

=== Libertarian Party ===
- John M. Reda

== General election results ==
Delaware lieutenant gubernatorial election, 2004
Party	Candidate	Votes	%
Democratic	John Carney Jr. (incumbent)	218,442	62.11%
Republican	James P. Ursomarso	127,501	36.25%
Independent Party	Michael Robert Dore	4,134	1.18%
Libertarian	John M. Reda	1,646	0.47%
Total votes		351,723	100%
Democratic hold			

== See also ==
- 2004 Delaware gubernatorial election
