= 2014 Delaware Attorney General election =

- November 4, 2014
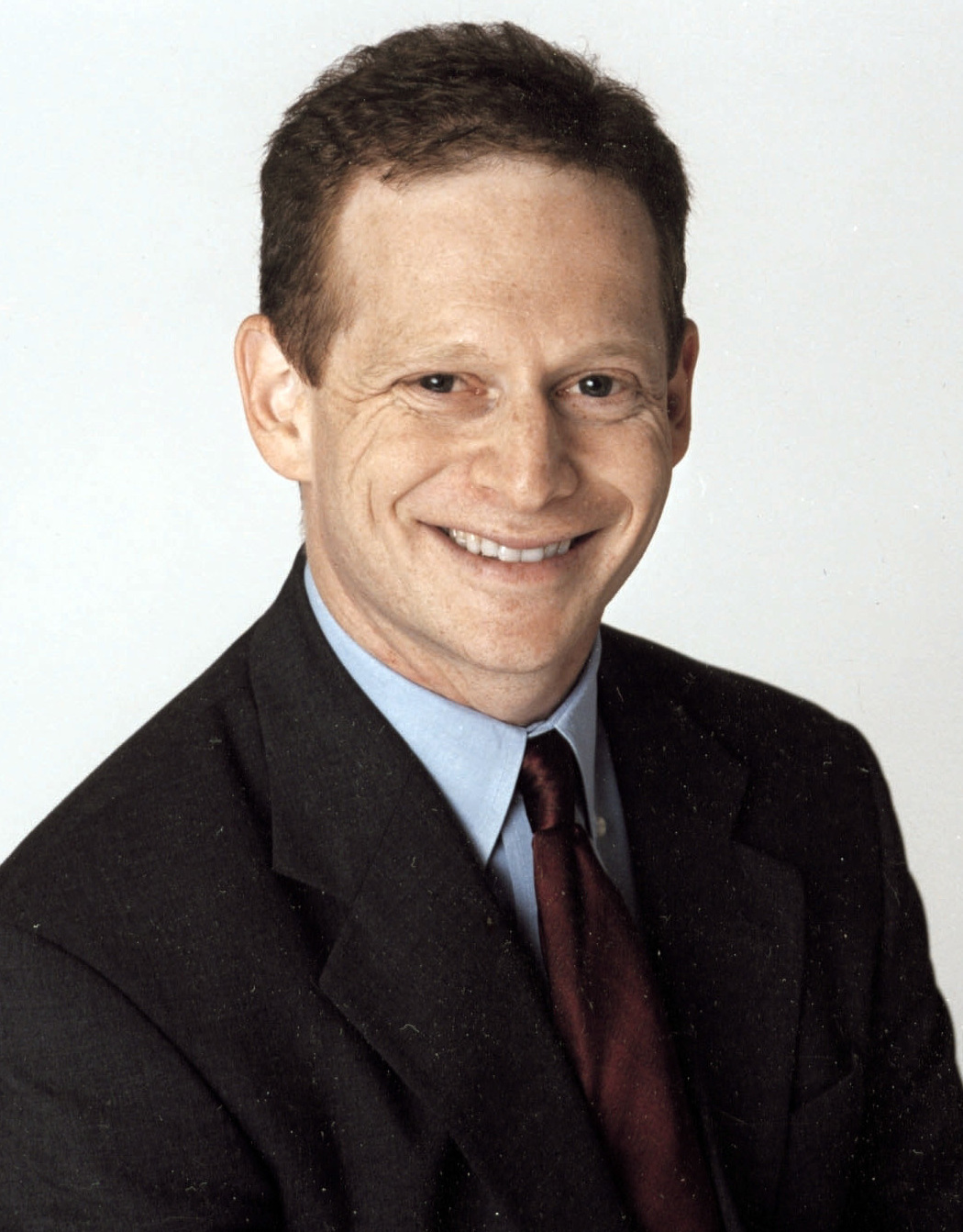

Nominee	Matthew Denn	Ted Kittila
Party	Democratic	Republican
Popular vote	121,410	90,257
Percentage	52.76%	39.22%
- Denn: 40–50% 50–60% 60–70% 70–80% 80–90% Kittila: 40–50% 50–60% 60–70%
Attorney General before election
Beau Biden
Democratic
Elected Attorney General
Matthew Denn
Democratic

The 2014 Delaware Attorney General election took place on November 4, 2014, to elect the Attorney General of Delaware. Incumbent Democratic Attorney General Beau Biden did not run for re-election to a third term in office instead opting to run for governor in 2016, but died of brain cancer on May 30, 2015.

Democrat Lieutenant Governor of Delaware Matthew Denn defeated Republican corporate attorney Ted Kittila with 52.76% of the vote.

== Democratic primary ==
=== Candidates ===
==== Nominee ====
- Matthew Denn, Lieutenant Governor of Delaware (2009–2015)

==== Declined ====
- Beau Biden, incumbent attorney general
- Kathy Jennings, former New Castle County chief administrative officer

=== Results ===
Democratic primary results
Party	Candidate	Votes	%
Democratic	Matthew Denn	Unopposed	
Total votes		—N/a	100.0

== Republican primary ==
=== Candidates ===
==== Nominee ====
- Ted Kittila, corporate attorney

==== Declined ====
- Colm Connolly, former United States Attorney for the District of Delaware

=== Results ===
Republican primary results
Party	Candidate	Votes	%
Republican	Ted Kittila	Unopposed	
Total votes		—N/a	100.0

== Third-parties and Independents ==
=== Independent Party ===
==== Nominee ====
- David Graham, tax auditor

=== Green Party ===
==== Nominee ====
- Catherine Damavandi, former deputy attorney general of Delaware

=== Libertarian Party ===
==== Nominee ====
- John Machurek, former candidate for state representative in 2012

== General election ==
=== Results ===
2014 Delaware Attorney General election
Party	Candidate	Votes	%
Democratic	Matthew Denn	121,410	52.76
Republican	Ted Kittila	90,257	39.22
Green	Catherine Damavandi	10,599	4.61
Independent Party	David Graham	4,879	2.12
Libertarian	John Machurek	2,984	1.3
Total votes		230,129	100.0
Democratic hold			

== See also ==
- Delaware Attorney General
