= 2000 Delaware lieutenant gubernatorial election =

- November 7, 2000
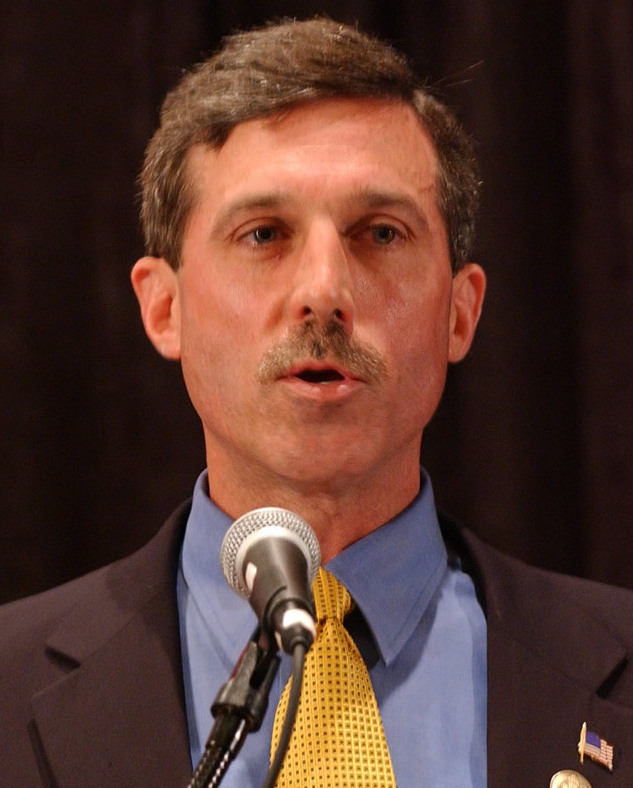

Nominee	John Carney	Dennis J. Rochford
Party	Democratic	Republican
Popular vote	193,348	119,943
Percentage	61.72%	38.28%
- Carney: 50–60% 60–70% 70–80% 80–90% >90% Rochford: 50–60%
Lieutenant Governor before election
Ruth Ann Minner
Democratic
Elected Lieutenant Governor
John Carney
Democratic

The 2000 Delaware lieutenant gubernatorial election was held on November 7, 2000, in order to elect the lieutenant governor of Delaware. Democratic nominee John Carney defeated Republican nominee Dennis J. Rochford.

== General election ==
On election day, November 7, 2000, Democratic nominee John Carney won the election by a margin of 73,405 votes against his opponent Republican nominee Dennis J. Rochford, thereby retaining Democratic control over the office of lieutenant governor. Carney was sworn in as the 24th lieutenant governor of Delaware on January 16, 2001.

=== Results ===
Delaware lieutenant gubernatorial election, 2000
Party	Candidate	Votes	%
Democratic	John Carney	193,348	61.72
Republican	Dennis J. Rochford	119,943	38.28
Total votes		313,291	100.00
Democratic hold			
