= Expatriate Health Coverage Clarification Act of 2014 =

- Long title: To clarify the treatment under the Patient Protection and Affordable Care Act of health plans in which expatriates are the primary enrollees, and for other purposes.
- Announced in: the 113th United States Congress
- Sponsored by: Rep. John Carney (D-DE)

Legislative history
- Introduced in the House as H.R. 4414 by Rep. John Carney (D-DE) on April 7, 2014; Committee consideration by United States House Committee on Ways and Means, United States House Committee on Energy and Commerce, United States House Committee on Education and the Workforce, United States House Committee on the Judiciary, United States House Committee on Natural Resources, United States House Committee on House Administration

The Expatriate Health Coverage Clarification Act of 2014 (H.R. 4414) is a bill that would make a small modification to the Patient Protection and Affordable Care Act (ACA; "Obamacare") to exempt health plans directed at and used by expatriates from the ACA's requirements.

The bill was introduced into the United States House of Representatives during the 113th United States Congress. It was enacted as Division M of the Consolidated and Further Continuing Appropriations Act, 2015, Public Law 113–235 (128 Stat. 2130).

== Background ==
An expatriate (sometimes shortened to expat) is a person temporarily or permanently residing in a country other than that of the person's upbringing. The word comes from the Latin terms ex ("out of") and patria ("country, fatherland"). In common usage, the term is often used in the context of professionals or skilled workers sent abroad by their companies, rather than for all 'immigrants' or 'migrant workers'. In May 2013, the State Department estimated that there are currently 7.6 million Americans living outside the United States.

== Provisions of the bill ==
The bill would exempt expatriate health care plans from the requirements of the Affordable Care Act. An "expatriate health care plan" is one in which substantially all participants are "qualified expatriates"; the bill defines a "qualified expatriate" as U.S. national, lawful permanent resident, or non-immigrant about whom there is a good faith expectation of being abroad, in connection with his or her employment, for at least 90 days in a 12-month period, or of traveling abroad on at least 15 occasions during such a period; or an individual who is abroad as a member of a group determined appropriate by the Secretary of Health and Human Services.

== Procedural history ==
The Expatriate Health Coverage Clarification Act of 2014 was introduced into the United States House of Representatives on April 7, 2014 by Rep. John Carney (D-DE). The bill was referred to the United States House Committee on Ways and Means, the United States House Committee on Energy and Commerce, the United States House Committee on Education and the Workforce, the United States House Committee on the Judiciary, the United States House Committee on Natural Resources, and the United States House Committee on House Administration. The bill was scheduled to be voted on under a suspension of the rules, indicating that the House leadership expected to easily get the two-thirds majority needed for passage. The bill passed the House on April 29, 2014 with sixty Democrats and 208 Republicans voting in favor. The White House expressed reservations, stating that the bill "would reduce consumer protections and create even more loopholes in the tax code."

== Debate and discussion ==
The bill was considered "bipartisan." It was introduced by a Democrat and co-sponsored by 11 more Democrats and 9 Republicans. If the bill became law, it would be the eighth law modifying Obamacare to become law, although over 50 attempts have been made, indicating how much bipartisan support this bill would have.

Rep. John Carney argued that expatriates, a group that includes businessmen, pilots, and ship captains, usually already have special, high-quality health care plans designed to meet their unique needs as expatriates. Carney said that "expatriate health insurance plans offer high-end, robust coverage to executives and others working outside their home country, giving them access to a global network of health care providers." Carney indicated that requiring American expatriate health care providers to meet the tax and reporting requirements of the Affordable Care Act would put them at an unfair competitive disadvantage in comparison to foreign companies offering similar health care plans.

President Barack Obama's administration already temporarily addressed this issue by exempting through 2017 some expatriate healthcare providers from the requirements.

On the occasion of the bill's passage by the House, Delaware Governor Jack Markell issued a statement praising his state's Congressmen for their work on the bill, saying that it would keep hundreds of Cigna jobs from being moved out of their state.

== See also ==
- List of bills in the 113th United States Congress
