= 2014 United States Senate election in Delaware =

- November 4, 2014
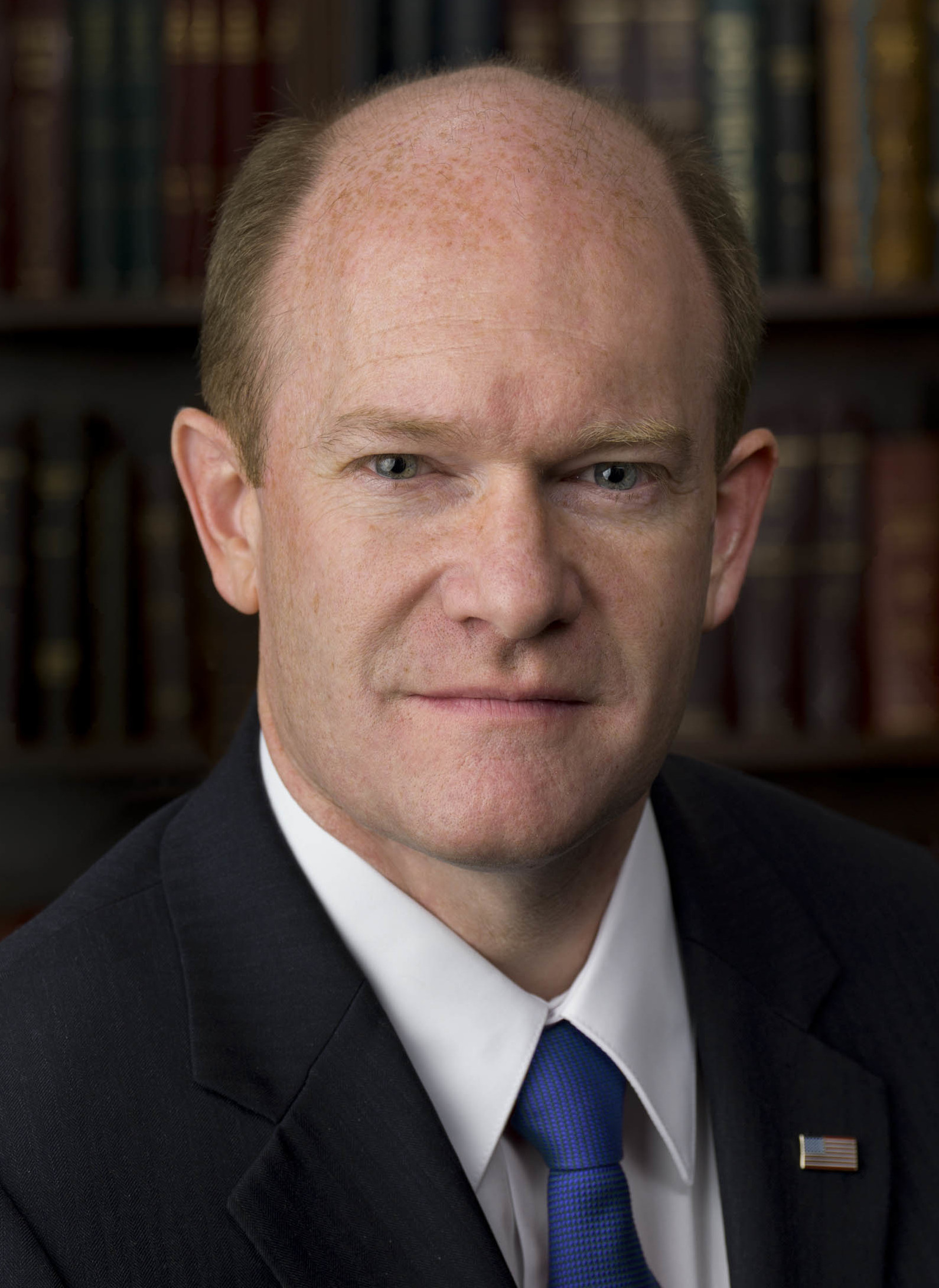

Nominee	Chris Coons	Kevin Wade
Party	Democratic	Republican
Popular vote	130,655	98,823
Percentage	55.83%	42.23%
- Coons: 50–60% 60–70% 70–80% 80–90% Wade: 40–50% 50–60% 60–70%
U.S. senator before election
Chris Coons
Democratic
Elected U.S. Senator
Chris Coons
Democratic

The 2014 United States Senate election in Delaware was held on November 4, 2014, to elect a member of the United States Senate to represent the State of Delaware, concurrently with other elections to the United States Senate in other states and elections to the United States House of Representatives and various state and local elections. This election was the fifth consecutive even-number year in which a senate election was held in Delaware after elections in 2006, 2008, 2010, and 2012.

Incumbent Democratic Senator Chris Coons ran for re-election to a first full term in office. He was unopposed for the Democratic nomination and defeated Republican businessman Kevin Wade in the general election.

== Background ==
Democratic senator Joe Biden was re-elected to a seventh term in 2008, defeating Republican political commentator Christine O'Donnell by 65% to 35%. At the same time, he was elected Vice President of the United States and resigned his Senate seat to be sworn in as vice president in January 2009. Delaware Governor Ruth Ann Minner appointed Biden's longtime aide Ted Kaufman to the seat until a special election was held in November 2010. In the election, Christine O'Donnell ran again and upset U.S. Representative and former governor Mike Castle in the Republican primary to face Democrat Chris Coons, who had run unopposed for his party's nomination. In the general election, Coons defeated O'Donnell by 57% to 40% and was sworn in later that month.

== Democratic primary ==
=== Candidates ===
==== Declared ====
- Chris Coons, incumbent U.S. Senator

==== Declined ====
- Beau Biden, Delaware Attorney General and son of then vice president Joe Biden

== Republican primary ==
=== Candidates ===
==== Declared ====
- Carl Smink, retired engineer and businessman
- Kevin Wade, businessman and nominee for the U.S. Senate in 2012

==== Declined ====
- Mike Castle, former U.S. Representative, former Governor of Delaware and candidate for the U.S. Senate in 2010
- Tom Kovach, New Castle County Council President and nominee for Delaware's at-large congressional district in 2012
- Christine O'Donnell, political commentator, candidate for the U.S. Senate in 2006 and nominee for the U.S. Senate in 2008 and 2010

=== Primary results ===
Republican primary results
Party	Candidate	Votes	%
Republican	Kevin Wade	18,181	75.66
Republican	Carl Smink	5,848	24.34
Total votes		24,029	100

== Other candidates ==
=== Green Party ===
==== Nominee ====
- Andrew Groff, computer science professor and nominee for the U.S. Senate in 2012

== General election ==
=== Fundraising ===
Candidate	Raised	Spent	Cash on Hand
Chris Coons (D)	$7,684,608	$4,831,183	$2,853,426

=== Debates ===
- This is a video of the sole debate held on October 15, 2014

=== Predictions ===
Source	Ranking	As of
The Cook Political Report	Solid D	November 3, 2014
Sabato's Crystal Ball	Safe D	November 3, 2014
Rothenberg Political Report	Safe D	November 3, 2014
Real Clear Politics	Safe D	November 3, 2014

=== Polling ===
Poll source	Date(s) administered	Sample size	Margin of error	Chris Coons (D)	Kevin Wade (R)	Other	Undecided
CBS News/NYT/YouGov	October 16–23, 2014	461	± 7%	54%	36%	0%	10%
CBS News/NYT/YouGov	September 20 – October 1, 2014	471	± 5%	51%	35%	0%	14%
University of Delaware	September 10–22, 2014	902	± 3.9%	50%	25%	6%	21%
Rasmussen Reports	September 10–12, 2014	750	± 4%	49%	34%	4%	12%
CBS News/NYT/YouGov	August 18 – September 2, 2014	697	± 5%	48%	35%	1%	16%
CBS News/NYT/YouGov	July 5–24, 2014	840	± 3.5%	60%	—	15%	25%

Hypothetical polling

Poll source	Date(s) administered	Sample size	Margin of error	Chris Coons (D)	Christine O'Donnell (R)	Other	Undecided
Princeton Survey Research	September 3–16, 2013	902	± 3.9%	51%	28%	—	22%

=== Results ===
Coons easily won the election to a full term, with 56% of the vote. Coons was projected the winner right when the polls closed in Delaware. Wade conceded defeat at 8:32 P.M. EST.

United States Senate election in Delaware, 2014
Party	Candidate	Votes	%	±%
Democratic	Chris Coons (incumbent)	130,655	55.83%	−0.78%
Republican	Kevin Wade	98,823	42.23%	+2.20%
Green	Andrew Groff	4,560	1.95%	N/A
Total votes		234,038	100.00%	N/A
Democratic hold				

==== By county ====
County	Chris Coons Democratic		Kevin Wade Republican		Andrew Groff Green	
County	#	%	#	%	#	%
Kent	19,218	48.74	19,527	49.53	681	1.73
New Castle	84,985	63.82	45,229	33.97	2,948	2.21
Sussex	26,452	43.05	34,067	55.44	931	1.52
Totals	130,655	55.83	98,823	42.23	4,560	1.95

== See also ==
- 2014 United States Senate elections
- 2014 United States elections
- 2014 United States House of Representatives election in Delaware
