= Shirley Price =

American politician

Member of Delaware House of Representatives for the 38th district
- In office 1996–2002
- Preceded by: Gerald Hocker

Personal details
- Party: Democratic

Shirley Price is an American politician. She was a member of the Delaware House of Representatives from 1996 to 2002. In the 2012 election, she ran for her old seat but was defeated by Republican candidate Ronald Gray.
