= Delaware Department of Insurance =

State agency in Delaware

Division overview
- Jurisdiction: Delaware
- Headquarters: 1351 West North Street, Suite 101, Dover, Delaware
- Division executive: Trinidad Navarro, Delaware Insurance Commissioner
- Website: insurance.delaware.gov

The Delaware Department of Insurance is a state agency in the U.S. State of Delaware. The agency is a member of the National Association of Insurance Commissioners (NAIC).

== History ==
The agency moved from its previous office at 841 Silver Lake Blvd in Dover, Delaware to its current office at 1351 West North Street in Denver in 2019.

In 2022, the Department of Insurance released a study in conjunction with the Consumer Federation of America (CFA) that found that some auto insurance companies charge women up to 21% more in premium costs compared to men. The findings led to Kyle Evans Gay, a member of the Delaware Senate, to introduce a bill that would outlaw insurance companies in the state from considering gender when charging drivers.

== Leadership ==
The agency is led by the Delaware Insurance Commissioner, an elected office in the U.S. State of Delaware. The current Delaware Insurance Commissioner is Democrat Trinidad Navarro, who was re-elected to a second consecutive term in office in the 2020 election.

== Former Insurance Commissioners ==
Name	Political Party	# of Terms Served	Date First Elected	Date Assumed Office	Final Day in Office
Trinidad Navarro	Democrat	2	November 8, 2016	January 3, 2017	Still in office
Karen Weldin Stewart	Democrat	2	November 4, 2008	January 4, 2009	January 3, 2017
Matthew Denn	Democrat	1	November 2, 2004	January 4, 2005	January 4, 2009
Donna Lee Harpster Williams	Republican	3	November 3, 1992	January 5, 1993	January 4, 2005
David N. Levinson	Democrat	2	November 6, 1984	January 2, 1985	January 5, 1993
David H. Elliott	Republican	2	November 2, 1976	January 1977	January 2, 1985
John Francis Richardson	Unknown	Appointed by Gov. Sherman W. Tribbitt on interim basis	N/A	March 25, 1976	January 1977
Robert A. Short	Republican	3 full terms plus 82 days	November 6, 1962	January 1, 1963	March 23, 1976 (resigned to take President and CEO position at Sussex Trust Company in Georgetown)
Harry S. Smith	Democrat	2	November 2, 1954	January 4, 1955	January 1, 1963
William R. Murphy	Republican	1	November 7, 1950	January 2, 1951	January 4, 1955
William J. Swain	Republican		November 5, 1946	January 1947	January 2, 1951
