= Sher Valenzuela =

American politician

Cheryl "Sher" Valenzuela
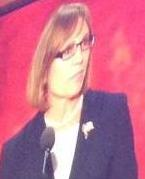
- Valenzuela speaking at the 2012 Republican National Convention in Tampa, Florida

Personal details
- Party: Republican
- Spouse: Eli
- Occupation: Businesswoman and politician
- Profession: Small-business owner

Cheryl "Sher" Valenzuela is an American small-business owner and politician. She was the Republican candidate for Lieutenant Governor of Delaware in 2012 and unsuccessfully ran for the Republican nomination for State Treasurer of Delaware in 2014.

== Background ==
Valenzuela married her husband Eli and moved to Delaware in the early 1990s to care for her aging mother in neighboring New Jersey. She is a mother of three sons in a blended family, with Ian from her previous marriage, Simon from her current husband, and Pedro whom they adopted. Her second son, Simon, was diagnosed as autistic and Valenzuela describes the fight to overcome the negative prognosis as one of the reasons she would start her small business.

She and her husband are the vice president and president, respectively, of their own small business, First State Manufacturing, an industrial upholstery company based in Milford, Delaware. For her efforts and contributions to the Delaware economy, Valenzuela was awarded the Small Business Administration's Small Businessperson of the Year Award in 2012. First State Manufacturing employs approximately 60 people and provides a variety of goods ranging from seat covers for restaurants, to engine covers for the United States Air Force, to ballistic vests for the Israel Defense Forces.

== Political career ==
In April 2012, Valenzuela was nominated by the Delaware Republican Party as its candidate for lieutenant governor. She ran against incumbent Democrat Matthew Denn and Libertarian challenger Margie Waite-McKeown.

On August 28, 2012, Valenzuela spoke at the 2012 Republican National Convention in Tampa, Florida. She spoke that night between fellow Republican women candidates Mia Love, the incumbent mayor of Saratoga Springs, Utah, and nominee for the U.S. House of Representatives in Utah's 2nd congressional district; and Cathy Rodgers, the incumbent U.S. Representative for Washington's 5th congressional district.

On November 6, 2012, the 2012 Delaware lieutenant gubernatorial election took place, where Valenzuela lost to incumbent Denn. She received 37.1% of the vote, versus Denn's 61.6%, and only held a lead in Sussex County, failing to receive a majority of votes in Kent County, New Castle County, or the greater Wilmington metropolitan area. Valenzuela, however, did lose by a smaller margin to her opponent than did any of the other statewide Republican candidates in the state.

In 2014, Valenzuela ran for State Treasurer of Delaware. She was defeated in the Republican primary by Ken Simpler following a contentious race marked by infighting and with outside spending behind both candidates, who frequently criticized each other.

== Electoral history ==
Lieutenant Governor of Delaware, 2012 (General)
Party	Candidate	Votes	%	±%
Democratic	Matthew Denn (incumbent)	238,957	61.6	−
Republican	Cheryl "Sher" Valenzuela	143,978	37.1	−
Libertarian	Margie Waite-McKeown	5,206	1.3	−

State Treasurer of Delaware, 2014 (Primary)
Party	Candidate	Votes	%	±%
Republican	Ken Simpler	13,491	53.88	−
Republican	Cheryl "Sher" Valenzuela	11,549	46.12	−

== See also ==
- List of people from Delaware
