= 2012 Baton Rouge mayoral election =

- November 6, 2012
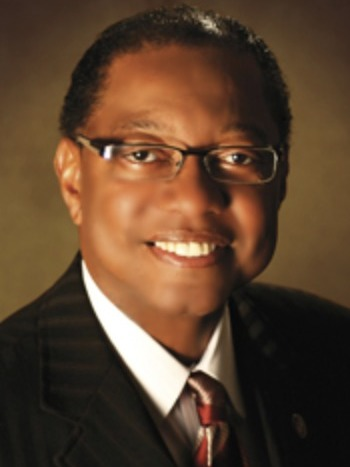

Candidate	Kip Holden	Mike Walker Sr.
Party	Democratic	Republican
Popular vote	115,305	65,972
Percentage	60.02%	34.34%
Mayor before election
Kip Holden
Democratic
Elected mayor
Kip Holden
Democratic

The 2012 Baton Rouge mayoral election was held on November 6, 2012, to elect the mayor-president of Baton Rouge, Louisiana. It saw the reelection of incumbent mayor-president Kip Holden. Since Holden won an outright majority in the first round, no runoff was necessitated.

== Results ==
Results
Party	Candidate	Votes	%
Democratic	Kip Holden (incumbent)	115,305	60.02
Republican	J. Michael "Mike" Walker, Sr	65,972	34.34
None	Gordon Mese	6,585	3.43
None	Steve Meyers	4,256	2.22
Total votes		192,118	
