= Ronald E. Gray =

American politician

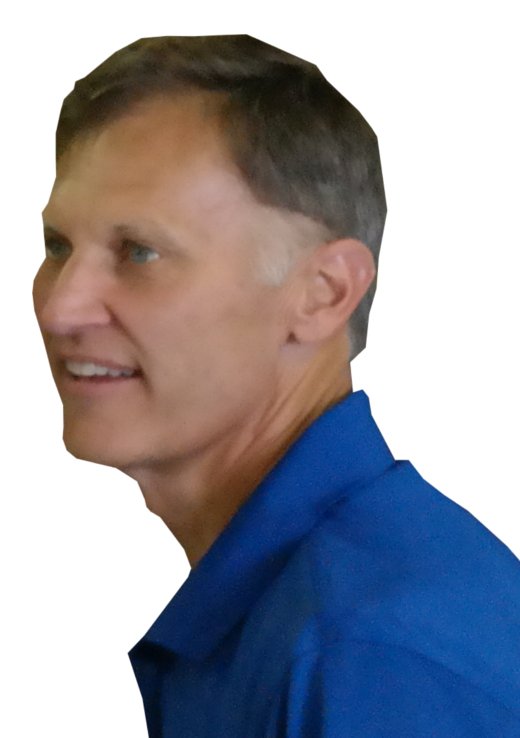

Member of the Delaware House of Representatives from the 38th district
- Incumbent
- Assumed office November 7, 2012
- Preceded by: Gerald Hocker

Personal details
- Party: Republican
- Education: University of Delaware; Indiana University Bloomington
- Website: reprongray.com

Ronald E. Gray is an American politician. He is a Republican member of the Delaware House of Representatives, representing District 38. He was elected in 2012 to replace Republican Gerald Hocker, who had resigned to run for a seat in the Delaware Senate.

Gray attended Indian River High School. He earned his bachelor's degree in civil engineering from the University of Delaware and his Master of Business Administration from Indiana University School of Business.

== Electoral history ==
- In 2012, Gray won the general election with 7,902 votes (61.1%) against Democratic nominee Shirley Price, a former state representative for the 38th district. Price had served in the seat after being elected in 2000, but had been unseated by Hocker in 2002 and unsuccessfully ran to reclaim the seat in 2004.
- In 2014, Gray was unopposed in the general election and won 7,133 votes.
- In 2016, Gray was unopposed in the general election and won 12,188 votes.
- In 2018, Gray won the general election with 9,635 votes (65.8%) against Democratic nominee Meghan M. Kelly.

Delaware House of Representatives
Preceded by Gerald Hocker	Member of the Delaware House of Representatives from the 35th district 2012–Present	Incumbent
