= Matthew Denn =

American lawyer and politician

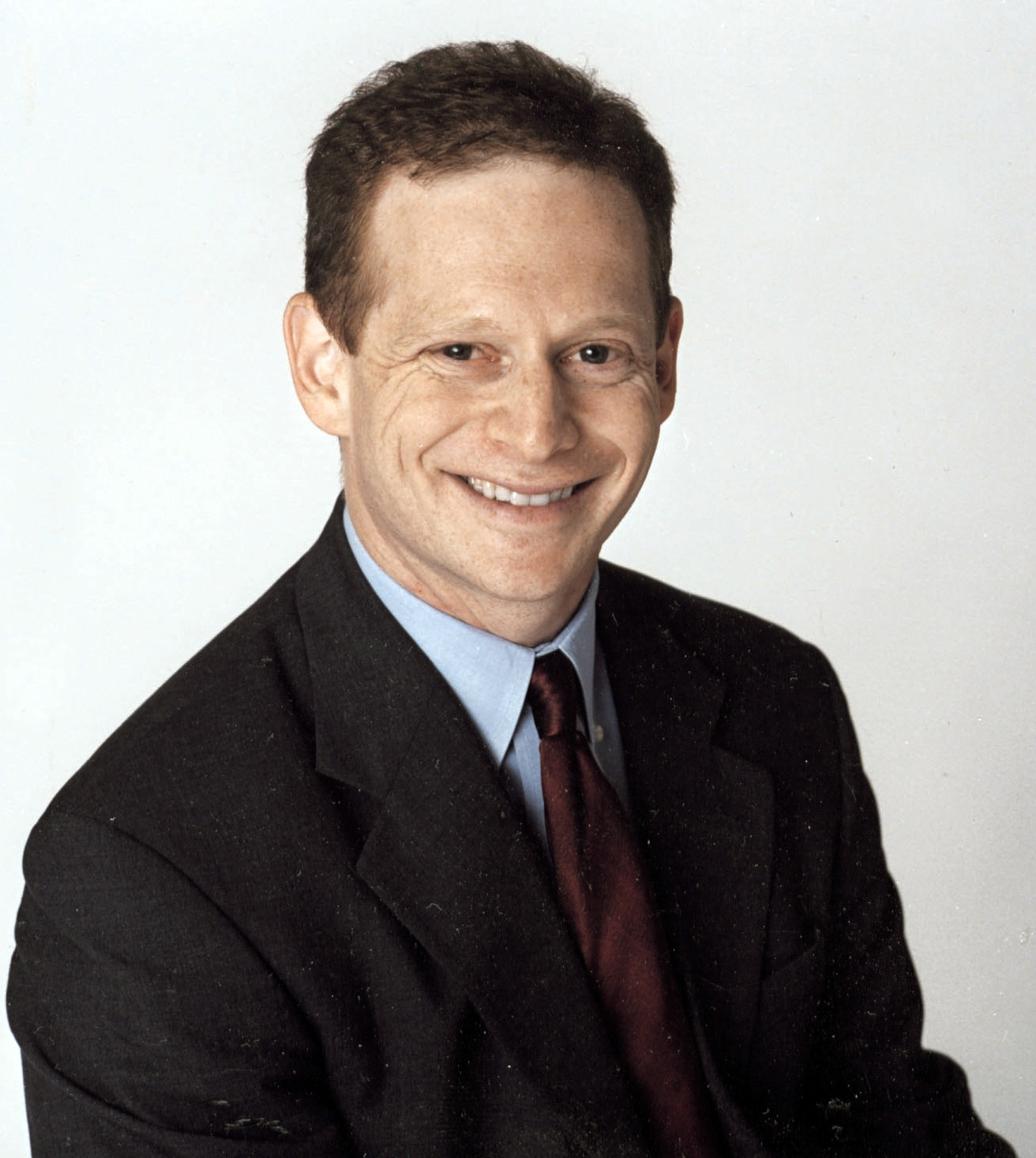

45th Attorney General of Delaware
- In office January 6, 2015 – January 1, 2019
- Governor: Jack Markell; John Carney
- Preceded by: Beau Biden
- Succeeded by: Kathy Jennings

25th Lieutenant Governor of Delaware
- In office January 20, 2009 – January 6, 2015
- Governor: Jack Markell
- Preceded by: John Carney
- Succeeded by: Bethany Hall-Long (2017)

Insurance Commissioner of Delaware
- In office January 4, 2005 – January 4, 2009
- Governor: Ruth Ann Minner
- Preceded by: Donna Lee Williams
- Succeeded by: Karen Stewart

Personal details
- Born: February 9, 1966 (age 60) Wilmington, Delaware, U.S.
- Party: Democratic
- Spouse: Michele
- Children: 2
- Education: University of California, Berkeley (BA); Yale University (JD)

Matthew P. Denn (born February 9, 1966) is an American lawyer and politician from New Castle County, Delaware. He served as the 45th attorney general of Delaware from 2015 until 2019. Denn previously served as the 25th lieutenant governor of Delaware from 2009 to 2015, and was the Insurance Commissioner of Delaware from 2005 to 2009. After leaving public office, Denn joined the global law firm DLA Piper as Managing Partner of the firm's Wilmington office.

== Early life and education ==
Denn was born in Wilmington, Delaware, to Morton Denn, a Professor Emeritus of chemical engineering at the City College of New York, and Marilyn Denn. He grew up in suburban Hockessin and attended H.B. du Pont Middle School. He later moved to California with his family during high school. He graduated with a Bachelor of Arts from the University of California, Berkeley, and he received his Juris Doctor from Yale Law School in 1991.

== Professional career ==
Returning to Delaware in 1991, Denn worked for two years with Delaware Volunteer Legal Services, providing pro bono legal services to the underserved and underrepresented. Entering private practice, Denn became a partner with the law firm of Young, Conaway, Stargatt & Taylor in 2000. He was awarded the Distinguished Service Award from the Young Lawyers Section of the Delaware State Bar Association.

In 1998, Denn was appointed by Governor Tom Carper to serve as chairman of the Child Protection Accountability Commission, formed following the death of a four year old whose abuse and neglect went undetected by a state investigation. Under Denn's leadership, the commission lobbied to for caseload standards and career ladders for child protection workers, working to prevent inexperience and high turnover from compromising child safety.

== Political career ==
Denn served as Governor Ruth Ann Minner's legal counsel from 2001 through 2003, writing legislation including the Patient's Bill of Rights and the Emergency Health Powers Act.

In 1998, Denn ran for a seat in the Delaware State Senate against incumbent Republican Bob Connor. He lost that race but was elected State Insurance Commissioner in 2004, defeating Karen Weldin Stewart in the Democratic primary race, and later defeating Republican Party candidate, Dave Ennis, a member of Delaware General Assembly, in the general election. Denn served as Insurance Commissioner from January 4, 2005, until January 4, 2009.

Denn was elected Lieutenant Governor of Delaware in 2008, winning 61 percent of the vote to defeat Republican opponent State Senator Charlie Copeland. Another Democratic candidate, Wilmington City Council President Ted Blunt, ended his campaign in spring 2008, allowing Denn to avoid a primary contest. He took office in a ceremony just after midnight on January 20, 2009. As Lieutenant Governor, Denn focused on issues affecting children.

In 2014, Denn was the Democratic nominee for Attorney General, and he defeated Republican nominee Ted Kittila in the November general election. He served until 2019 and did not seek reelection.

== Personal life ==
Denn lives in Newark, Delaware with his wife, Michele, and their twin sons. He is Jewish.

== Electoral history ==
Election results
Year	Office	Election	Subject	Party	Votes	%	Opponent	Party	Votes	%	Opponent	Party	Votes	%
1996	State Senate	General	Matthew P. Denn	Democratic	6,632	45.7%	Robert T. Connor	Republican	7,860	54.2%				
2004	Insurance Commissioner	Primary	Matthew P. Denn	Democratic	18,436	58%	Karen Weldin Stewart	Democratic	13,363	42%				
2004	Insurance Commissioner	General	Matthew P. Denn	Democratic	182,619	53%	David H. Ennis	Republican	163,027	47%				
2008	Lieutenant Governor	General	Matthew P. Denn	Democratic	236,741	61%	Charles L. Copeland	Republican	149,222	39%	Peter Cullen	Blue Enigma	1,681	0.5%
2012	Lieutenant Governor	General	Matthew P. Denn	Democratic	238,957	61.6%	Cheryl "Sher" Valenzuela	Republican	143,978	37.1%	Margaret McKeown	Libertarian	5,206	1.3%
2014	Attorney General	General	Matthew P. Denn	Democratic	121,410	52.8%	Theodore A. Kittila	Republican	90,257	39.2%	Catherine Damavandi	Green	10,599	4.6%

== See also ==
- List of Jewish American jurists

Party political offices
Preceded by Karen Stewart	Democratic nominee for Insurance Commissioner of Delaware; 2004	Succeeded by Karen Stewart
Preceded by John Carney	Democratic nominee for Lieutenant Governor of Delaware; 2008, 2012	Succeeded by Bethany Hall-Long
Preceded by Beau Biden	Democratic nominee for Attorney General of Delaware; 2014	Succeeded by Kathy Jennings
Political offices
Preceded by Donna Lee Williams	Insurance Commissioner of Delaware; 2005–2009	Succeeded by Karen Stewart
Preceded by John Carney	Lieutenant Governor of Delaware; 2009–2015	Vacant Title next held by Bethany Hall-Long; 2017
Preceded by Beau Biden	Attorney General of Delaware; 2015–2019	Succeeded by Kathy Jennings
