= 2012 Cheyenne mayoral election =

- November 6, 2012

Candidate	Richard L. Kaysen	John Palmer
Party	Nonpartisanism	Nonpartisanism
Popular vote	13,609	9,792
Percentage	57.97%	41.71%
Mayor before election
Richard L. Kaysen
Republican
Elected mayor
Richard L. Kaysen
Republican

The 2012 Cheyenne mayoral election was held on November 6, 2012, in order to elect the Mayor of Cheyenne, Wyoming. Incumbent Nonpartisan Mayor Richard L. Kaysen won re-election against Nonpartisan candidate John Palmer.

== General Election ==
The general election was held on November 6, 2012. Incumbent Mayor Richard L. Kaysen won re-election by a margin of 2,085 votes against his opponent Nonpartisan candidate John Palmer, thereby retaining Republican control over the office of Mayor of Cheyenne, Wyoming.

=== Results ===
Cheyenne, Wyoming mayoral election, 2012
Party	Candidate	Votes	%
Nonpartisanism	Richard L. Kaysen (incumbent)	13,609	57.97
Nonpartisanism	John Palmer	9,792	41.71
Write-In		75	0.32
Total votes		23,476	100.00
Republican hold			

== See also ==
- List of mayors of Cheyenne, Wyoming
