= Gerald Hocker =

American politician from Delaware (born 1948)

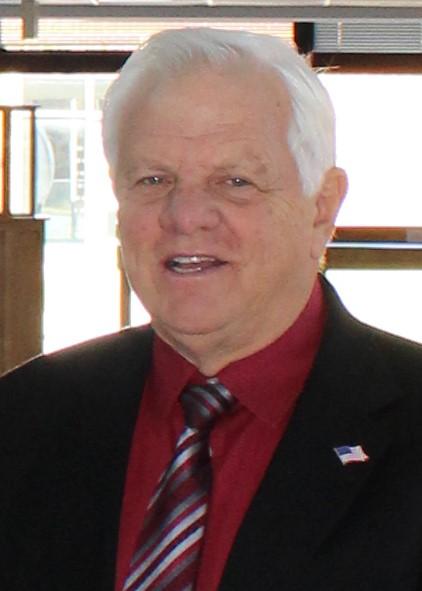

Minority Leader of the Delaware Senate
- Incumbent
- Assumed office January 8, 2019
- Preceded by: Gary Simpson

Member of the Delaware Senate from the 20th district
- Incumbent
- Assumed office November 7, 2012
- Preceded by: George Bunting

Member of the Delaware House of Representatives from the 38th district
- In office November 6, 2002 – November 7, 2012
- Preceded by: Shirley Price
- Succeeded by: Ronald Gray

Personal details
- Born: January 9, 1948 (age 78) Lewes, Delaware, U.S.
- Party: Republican
- Education: University of Delaware (BS)
- Website: Link Down

Gerald W. Hocker (born January 9, 1948) is an American politician who is a Republican member of the Delaware Senate, where he has represented the 20th district since 2012. Hocker previously served in the Delaware House of Representatives where he represented the 38th District from 2002 to 2012. Hocker has been the Senate Minority Leader since 2019.

Hocker was born on January 9, 1948, at Beebe Hospital in Lewes, Delaware. He was raised in Millville, Delaware where he graduated from Lord Baltimore High School in 1966. He then attended the University of Delaware, ultimately graduating with a Bachelor of Science in business administration.

== Elections ==
- In 2000, Hocker ran against incumbent Democratic Senator George Bunting for the Senate District 20 seat. He won the Republican primary, but lost the general election to Bunting.
- In 2002, Hocker ran against incumbent Democratic Representative Shirley Price for the House District 38 seat. He was unopposed in the Republican primary and won the three-way general election by 57 votes with 4,436 votes total (49.8%) against Price and Libertarian candidate Donna Layfield Sinnamon.
- In 2004, Hocker was challenged by Price for a rematch and won the general election with 7,653 votes (61.4%) against Price.
- In 2006, Hocker won the general election with 6,849 votes (72.3%) against Democratic nominee Robert Maddex.
- In 2008, Hocker won the general election with 9,769 votes (72.1%) against Democratic nominee Mary Ryan.
- In 2010, Hocker was unopposed in the general election, winning 9,371 votes.
- In 2012, Hocker ran for the Senate District 20 seat left open by the retirement of Democrat George Bunting. Hocker was unopposed for Republican primary and won the general election with 14,290 votes (68.0%) against Democratic nominee Richard Eakle.
- In 2016, Hocker won the general election with 17,908 votes (72.4%) against Democratic nominee Perry J. Mitchell.
- In 2020, Hocker was unopposed in the general election, winning 24,000 votes.

Delaware House of Representatives
Preceded by Shirley Price	Member of the Delaware House of Representatives from the 38th district 2002–2012	Succeeded by Ronald Gray
Delaware Senate
Preceded by George Bunting	Member of the Delaware Senate from the 20th district 2012–Present	Incumbent
Preceded by Gary Simpson	Minority Leader of the Delaware Senate; 2019–Present	Incumbent
