= 2012 Delaware gubernatorial election =

- November 6, 2012
- Turnout: 62.9%
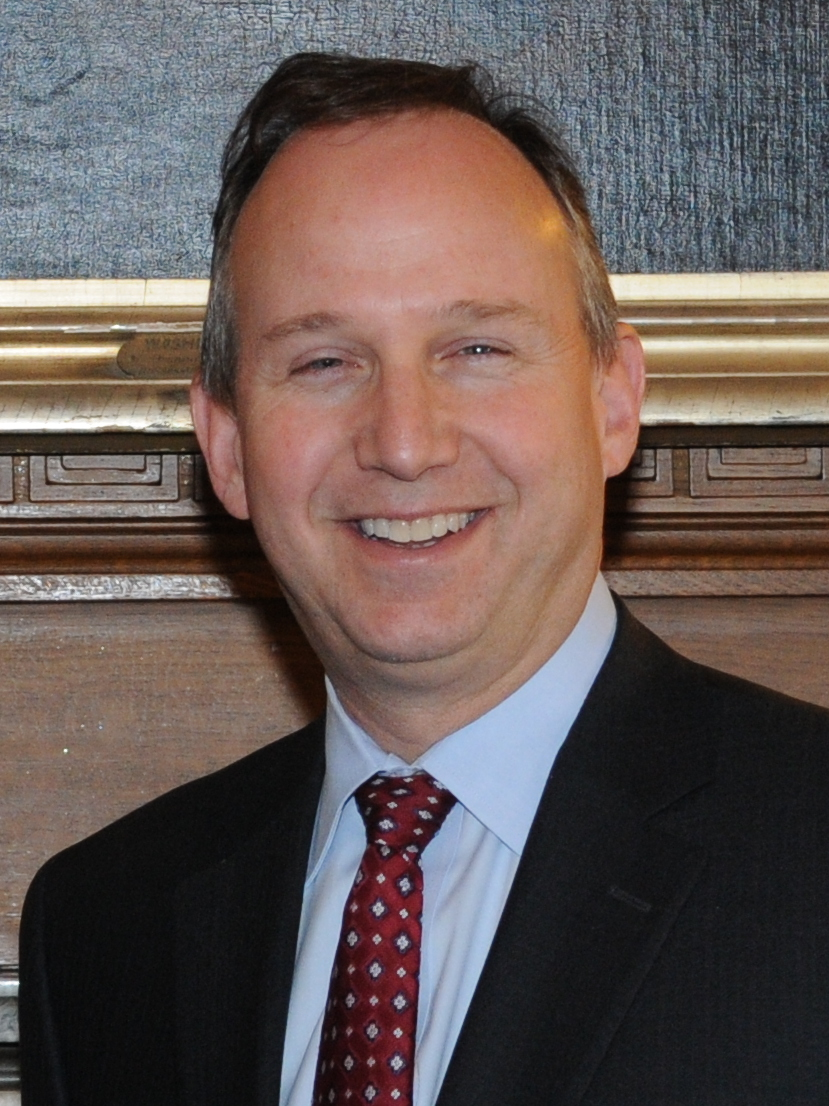

Nominee	Jack Markell	Jeff Cragg
Party	Democratic	Republican
Popular vote	275,993	113,793
Percentage	69.34%	28.59%
- Markell: 50–60% 60–70% 70–80% 80–90% >90%
Governor before election
Jack Markell
Democratic
Elected Governor
Jack Markell
Democratic

The 2012 Delaware gubernatorial election took place on November 6, 2012, to elect the governor of Delaware. Incumbent Democratic Governor Jack Markell won re-election to a second term, defeating Republican challenger Jeff Cragg in a landslide by a margin of over 40 points. As of 2026, this is the last time where a Democrat and a candidate from both major parties won all three of Delaware's counties in a gubernatorial election.

== General election ==
Democrat and Republican candidates were unopposed in their party primaries, which were held on September 11. The Green Party candidate was endorsed by the Green Party of Delaware at their annual meeting on May 11.

=== Candidates ===
- Jeff Cragg (R), businessman
- Jack Markell (D), incumbent Governor
- Mark Perri (G)

=== Predictions ===
Source	Ranking	As of
The Cook Political Report	Solid D	November 1, 2012
Sabato's Crystal Ball	Safe D	November 5, 2012
Rothenberg Political Report	Safe D	November 2, 2012
Real Clear Politics	Safe D	November 5, 2012

=== Debates ===
- Complete video of debate, October 17, 2012

=== Results ===
Delaware gubernatorial election, 2012
Party	Candidate	Votes	%	±%
Democratic	Jack Markell (incumbent)	275,993	69.34%	+1.82%
Republican	Jeff Cragg	113,793	28.59%	−3.46%
Green	Mark Perri	4,575	1.15%	N/A
Libertarian	Jesse McVay	3,668	0.92%	N/A
Total votes		398,029	100.00%	N/A
Democratic hold				

==== By county ====
County	Jack Markell Democratic		Jeffery Cragg Republican		All Others	
County	#	%	#	%	#	%
Kent	40,696	61.5	23,846	36.04	1,628	2.46
New Castle	183,858	75.93	53,510	22.1	4,871	1.97
Sussex	51,439	57.33	36,437	40.61	1,848	2.05
Totals	275,993	69.34	113,793	28.59	8,247	2.07

== See also ==
- 2012 Delaware elections
- 2012 United States gubernatorial elections
- 2012 Delaware lieutenant gubernatorial election
- 2012 United States House of Representatives election in Delaware
- 2012 United States Senate election in Delaware
