= 2012 Bahraini parliamentary by-election =

- 16 June 2012

1 lower house seat
- Turnout: 37.2%
Prime Minister before election
Khalifa Bin Salman Al Khalifa
Elected Prime Minister
Khalifa Bin Salman Al Khalifa

A parliamentary by-election was held in Bahrain on June 16, 2012, to elect a new member of the Council of Representatives for District 8 of the Muharraq Governorate. The seat was vacated after the previous incumbent Ghanim Al Buainain was appointed as the Minister of State for Foreign Affairs in April.

The winner of the elections was former Muharraq Municipal Councillor Sameer Kadhem, decided in a run-off vote held on June 23, 2012. The turnout in the first round of voting was 37.2%, as 3,029 votes were cast out of the total 8,128 registered voters.
