= John Carney (Delaware politician) =

American politician (born 1956)

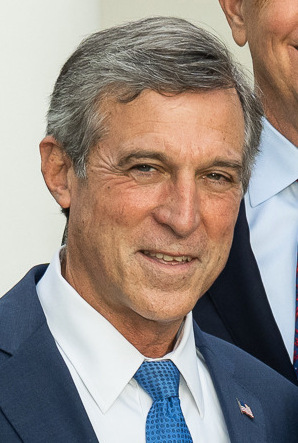
- Carney in 2021

58th Mayor of Wilmington
- Incumbent
- Assumed office January 7, 2025
- Preceded by: Mike Purzycki

74th Governor of Delaware
- In office January 17, 2017 – January 7, 2025
- Lieutenant: Bethany Hall-Long
- Preceded by: Jack Markell
- Succeeded by: Bethany Hall-Long

Member of the U.S. House of Representatives from Delaware's at-large district
- In office January 3, 2011 – January 3, 2017
- Preceded by: Mike Castle
- Succeeded by: Lisa Blunt Rochester

24th Lieutenant Governor of Delaware
- In office January 16, 2001 – January 20, 2009
- Governor: Ruth Ann Minner
- Preceded by: Ruth Ann Minner
- Succeeded by: Matthew Denn

45th Chair of the National Lieutenant Governors Association
- In office 2004–2005
- Preceded by: Karl Ohs
- Succeeded by: Jane Norton

Personal details
- Born: John Charles Carney Jr. May 20, 1956 (age 70) Wilmington, Delaware, U.S.
- Party: Democratic
- Spouse: Tracey Quillen (m. 1993)
- Children: 2
- Relatives: William T. Quillen (father-in-law); Brian O'Neill (nephew)
- Education: Dartmouth College (BA); University of Delaware (MPA)
- Carney's voice Carney supporting the Fair Access to Investment Research Act; Recorded April 26, 2016

John Charles Carney Jr. (born May 20, 1956) is an American politician serving as the 58th mayor of Wilmington, Delaware, since 2025. A member of the Democratic Party, Carney previously served as the 74th governor of Delaware from 2017 to 2025, the U.S. representative for Delaware's at-large congressional district from 2011 to 2017, the 24th lieutenant governor of Delaware from 2001 to 2009, and Delaware's secretary of finance from 1996 to 2000.

He first unsuccessfully sought the Democratic nomination for governor in 2008, losing to Jack Markell. He ran for governor again in 2016 and won, succeeding Markell, who was term-limited. He was re-elected in 2020, defeating Republican Julianne Murray with 59.5% of the vote. Carney won the 2024 Wilmington mayoral election, winning the primary election in September by 743 votes and the November general election with no opposition.

== Early life and education ==
John Charles Carney Jr. was born on May 20, 1956, in Wilmington, Delaware, and raised in nearby Claymont, the second of nine children of Ann Marie (née Buckley) and John Charles "Jack" Carney. Both his parents were educators. His great-grandparents immigrated from Ireland. Carney was quarterback of the 1973 state championship St. Mark's High School football team, and earned All-Ivy League and Most Valuable Player honors in football at Dartmouth College, from which he graduated in 1978. At Dartmouth, he joined the local Beta Alpha Omega fraternity. He later coached freshman football at the University of Delaware while earning his master's degree in public administration.

== Early political career ==
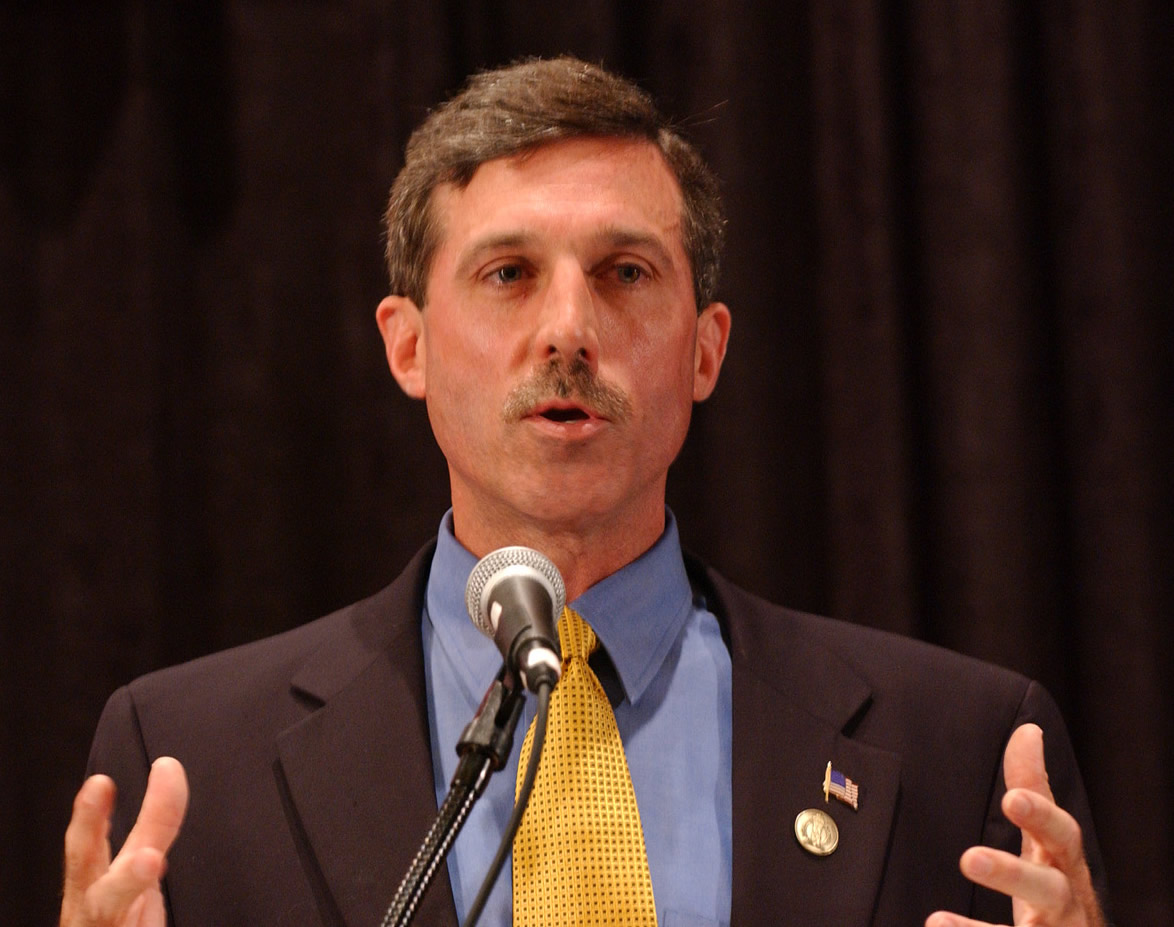
Carney giving a speech, 2005

Carney served as Deputy Chief Administrative Officer of New Castle County and as Secretary of Finance and Deputy Chief of Staff for Governor Tom Carper. He was elected lieutenant governor of Delaware in 2000 and served from January 16, 2001, until January 20, 2009. As lieutenant governor, he presided over the Delaware State Senate and chaired the Board of Pardons. He also chaired the Delaware Health Care Commission, the Interagency Council on Adult Literacy, the Criminal Justice Council, the Center for Education Technology, and the Livable Delaware Advisory Council. In 2002, he launched the education initiative "Models of Excellence in Education" to identify practices in schools that have raised student achievement. Carney was also selected by other lieutenant governors to chair the National Lieutenant Governors Association from July 2004 to July 2005.

Carney has long been an advocate for wellness issues in Delaware, sponsoring "BeHealthy Delaware" and "The Lt. Governor's Challenge" to encourage Delawareans to be more active and address the state's high rate of chronic disease. He fought for Delaware's public smoking ban to improve health, cut cancer rates, and discourage teens from starting to smoke.

After completing his tenure as lieutenant governor in 2009, Carney served as president and chief operating officer of Transformative Technologies, which is investing in the DelaWind project, to bring offshore wind turbine construction to Delaware. He planned to step down in early 2010 to concentrate on his U.S. House campaign.

== U.S. House of Representatives (2011–2017) ==
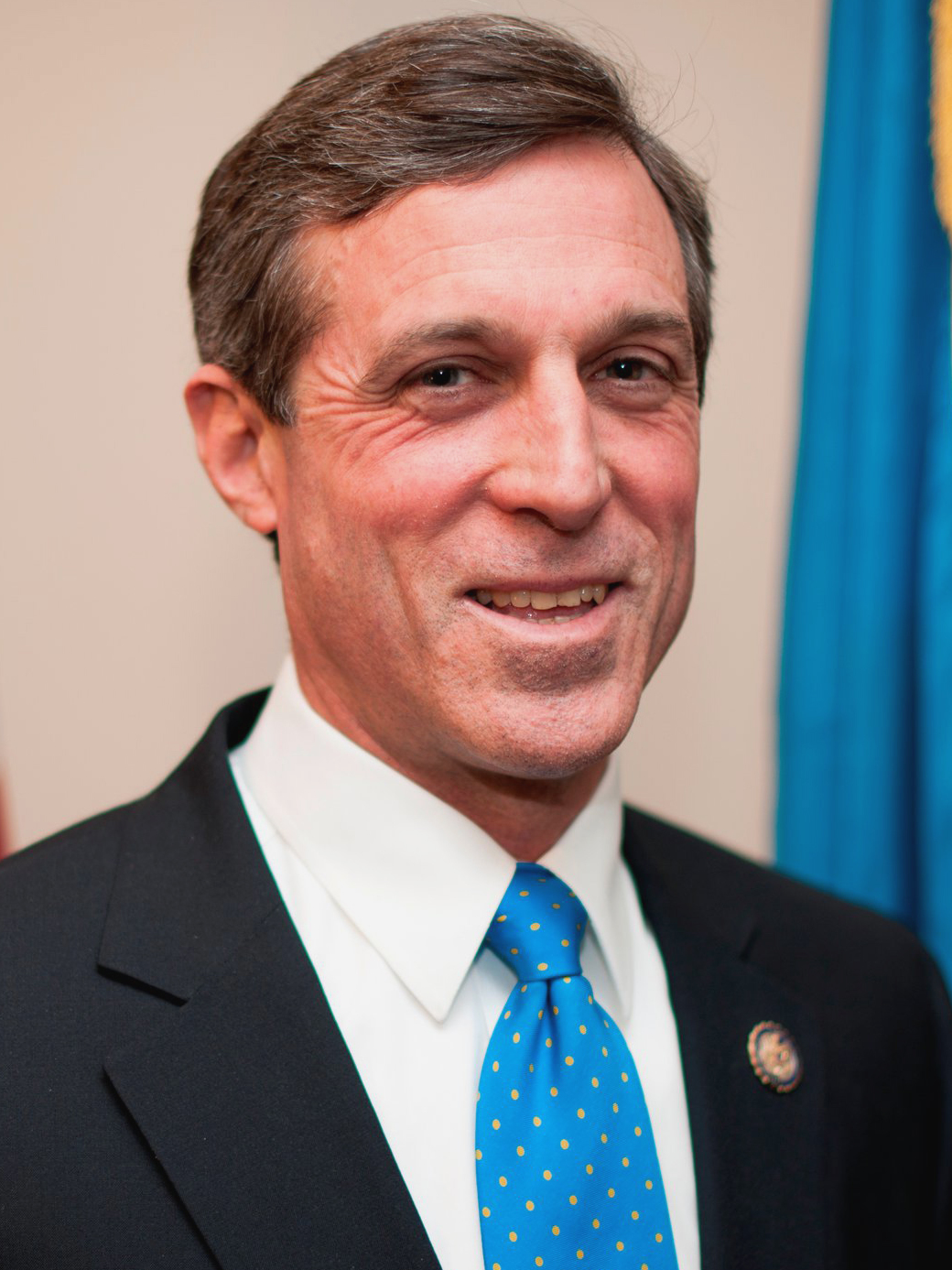
Carney during the 112th Congress

Carney was the Democratic nominee for Delaware's at-large seat in the United States House of Representatives in 2010. He faced Republican Glen Urquhart, Independent Party of Delaware nominee Earl R. Lofland, Libertarian Brent A. Wangen, and Blue Enigma Party nominee Jeffrey Brown. The seat had been held since 1993 by Republican Michael Castle, who declined to seek reelection to the House in order to run for the U.S. Senate seat once held by Vice President Joe Biden. In the first week of October, Fairleigh Dickinson University's PublicMind Poll released the results of its opinion research, showing Carney with a 15-point advantage over Urquhart, 51%-36%. Days before the election, a second Fairleigh Dickinson poll showed Carney leading by 17 points, 53% to 36% among likely voters. Carney won the seat by 16 points, 57% to 41%, and took office on January 3, 2011. His victory was one of the three seats Democrats gained in a year when they lost a net 63 seats to the Republicans.

In his bid for a second term in 2012, Carney faced Republican Tom Kovach, the president of the New Castle County Council, and two minor candidates. In a debate with Kovach, Carney said, "I will continue to do in Washington what I did in Delaware: work across the aisle to get things done. I learned early on that compromise is part of life." Carney called the Affordable Care Act (Obamacare) "not perfect" but the "only chance we have to get costs under control". He was reelected in a landslide, with 64% of the vote to Kovach's 33%. Carney ran for reelection to a third term in 2014. He defeated Republican Rose Izzo, 59% to 37%, with Green nominee Bernie August and Libertarian Scott Gesty taking 2% each.

In 2011, Carney and Illinois Republican Aaron Schock co-sponsored a bill that would use U.S. oil exploration to help fund a five-year federal highway construction project.

On April 7, 2014, Carney introduced the Expatriate Health Coverage Clarification Act of 2014 (H.R. 4414; 113th Congress) into the House. The bill would exempt expatriate health care plans from the requirements of the Affordable Care Act. Carney argued that expatriates, a group that includes businessmen, pilots, and ship captains, usually already have special, high-quality health care plans designed to meet their unique needs. He said that "expatriate health insurance plans offer high-end, robust coverage to executives and others working outside their home country, giving them access to a global network of health care providers." He indicated that requiring American expatriate health care providers to meet the Affordable Care Act's tax and reporting requirements would put them at an unfair competitive disadvantage in comparison to foreign companies offering similar health care plans.

Carney has served on the Committee on Financial Services, Subcommittee on Capital Markets and Government-Sponsored Enterprises, Subcommittee on Monetary Policy and Trade, and Subcommittee on Oversight and Investigations.

== Governor of Delaware (2017–2025) ==
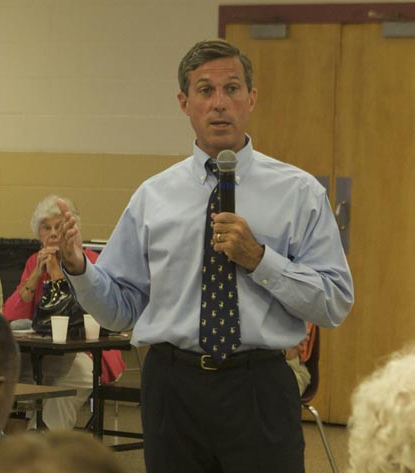
Carney at a campaign event, June 23, 2008

Carney sought the Democratic nomination for governor in 2008, as incumbent Governor Ruth Ann Minner was constitutionally barred from seeking a third term. Despite the backing of most of the party establishment, he lost the primary in an upset by fewer than 2,000 votes to State Treasurer Jack Markell, who went on to win the general election. Carney sought the Democratic nomination for governor again in 2016, as Markell was constitutionally barred from seeking a third term. Carney won the Democratic primary unopposed and went on to win the general election. He won a second term in 2020, defeating Republican Julianne Murray in a landslide in the general election, with 59.5% of the vote compared to her 38.6%.

On July 12, 2017, after signing Executive Order 11 to reestablish the Juvenile Justice Advisory Group, Carney said, "The Juvenile Justice Advisory Group will help us create an environment where all Delaware kids have an opportunity to succeed. This Executive Order will recharge and reenergize the group to find solutions that will work." On July 20, he vetoed a Delaware House of Representatives bill removing the five-mile radius of Delaware charter schools with enrollment preference and keeping out students in Wilmington, charging it with negatively impacting "some of our most vulnerable students."

On October 13, 2017, in response to President Donald Trump's ending cost-sharing reductions within the American health care system, Carney said the choice would lead to "more people being uninsured in our state, which eventually means increased premiums for all of us" and pledged he would work with the state congressional delegation to return the cost-sharing reductions.

In April 2019, Carney pardoned Barry Croft, a Bear, Delaware resident who had served a three-year sentence for possessing a gun during the commission of a felony. In October 2020, Croft was arrested and federally charged for his involvement in a kidnapping plot against Michigan Governor Gretchen Whitmer. The day after Croft's arrest, Carney described the federal charges as "disturbing", describing Croft's actions as "another warning sign about the growing threat of violence and radicalization in our politics."

On March 12, 2020, one day after the first case of COVID-19 was reported in the state, Carney declared a State of Emergency. He subsequently issued a series of declarations in response to the COVID-19 pandemic in Delaware. This included closing "non-essential" business, banning gatherings of more than 10 people, and instituting curfews on businesses.

On October 20th, 2021 Governor Carney signed House Bill 125 banning the possession, sale, manufacturing and distribution of homemade firearms. U.S. District Judge Maryellen Noreika issued a partial preliminary injunction blocking the criminalization of possessing homemade firearms.

On May 24, 2022, Carney vetoed a bill to legalize possession of up to one ounce of marijuana by adults for recreational use. In June 2022, Carney signed six gun safety bills into law, including a ban on assault weapons. In April 2023, he stated he would not veto a bill legalizing possession of cannabis a second time. The Delaware legislature passed the bill and Carney allowed it to become law without his signature.

On September 20, 2024, Carney vetoed a bill to legalize assisted suicide for patients with a terminal illness and less than six months to live.

On January 7, 2025, Carney resigned as governor so he could be sworn in as Mayor of Wilmington. His term was supposed to end on January 21, 2025, and Lieutenant Governor Bethany Hall-Long was sworn in on January 7 and served until January 21, when then Governor-elect Matt Meyer was sworn in.

== Mayor of Wilmington (2025–present) ==
Prevented by term limits from running for reelection in 2024, Carney was reported in late 2023 to be "seriously considering" a run to replace retiring mayor Mike Purzycki as mayor of Wilmington. He announced his candidacy in April, and faced former state treasurer and Wilmington city treasurer Velda Jones-Potter in the September Democratic primary. He won the primary by 743 votes, and was unopposed in the November general election. With his victory, Carney became the first sitting governor ever to be elected mayor.

== Personal life ==
Carney is Roman Catholic. On June 5, 1993, Carney married his wife, Tracey Quillen. Quillen is the daughter of former Delaware Secretary of State William T. Quillen. They have two children, Sam and Jimmy, who attended Wilmington Friends School. Sam graduated from Clemson University, while Jimmy is a computer science major at Tufts University. His nephew is football player Brian O'Neill, a offensive tackle for the Minnesota Vikings.

In 2015, Sam Carney was named as one of a number of defendants in two separate lawsuits filed by the parents of Tucker Hipps, whose 2014 death allegedly occurred during a fraternity hazing incident. The lawsuit was settled in July 2017. Criminal charges have never been filed in the case despite there being no statute of limitations in South Carolina.

== Electoral history ==
Elections are held the first Tuesday after November 1. The lieutenant governor takes office the third Tuesday of January with a four-year term. U.S. Representatives take office January 3 and have a two-year term.

Election results
Year	Office	Election	Subject	Party	Votes	%	Opponent	Party	Votes	%
2000	Lt. Governor	General	John Carney	Democratic	193,348	62%	Dennis J. Rochford	Republican	119,943	38%
2004	Lt. Governor	General	John Carney	Democratic	218,272	62%	James P. Ursomarso	Republican	127,425	36%
2008	Governor	Primary	John Carney	Democratic	36,112	49%	Jack Markell	Democratic	37,849	51%
2010	U.S. House of Representatives	General	John Carney	Democratic	173,443	57%	Glen Urquhart	Republican	125,408	41%
2012	U.S. House of Representatives	General	John Carney	Democratic	249,905	64%	Tom Kovach	Republican	129,749	33%
2014	U.S. House of Representatives	General	John Carney	Democratic	137,251	59%	Rose Izzo	Republican	85,146	37%
2016	Governor	General	John Carney	Democratic	248,404	58%	Colin Bonini	Republican	166,852	39%
2020	Governor	General	John Carney	Democratic	292,903	59%	Julianne Murray	Republican	190,312	39%

Party political offices
Preceded by Ruth Ann Minner	Democratic nominee for Lieutenant Governor of Delaware; 2000, 2004	Succeeded by Matthew Denn
Preceded by Jack Markell	Democratic nominee for Governor of Delaware; 2016, 2020	Succeeded by Matt Meyer
Political offices
Preceded by Ruth Ann Minner	Lieutenant Governor of Delaware; 2001–2009	Succeeded by Matthew Denn
Preceded by Jack Markell	Governor of Delaware; 2017–2025	Succeeded by Bethany Hall-Long
Preceded by Mike Purzycki	Mayor of Wilmington; 2025–present	Incumbent
U.S. House of Representatives
Preceded by Mike Castle	Member of the U.S. House of Representatives from Delaware's at-large congressional district 2011–2017	Succeeded by Lisa Blunt Rochester
U.S. order of precedence (ceremonial)
Preceded by Jack Markell as Former Governor	Order of precedence of the United States	Succeeded by Bethany Hall-Long as Former Governor
