= Karen Weldin Stewart =

American politician

Insurance Commissioner of Delaware
- In office January 4, 2009 – January 17, 2017
- Preceded by: Matthew Denn
- Succeeded by: Trinidad Navarro

Personal details
- Party: Democratic

Karen Weldin Stewart is an American politician. She served as the Delaware Insurance Commissioner from 2009 to 2017.

Weldin Stewart unsuccessfully ran for state insurance commissioner in 2000 general election and again in the 2004 Democratic primary. In 2008, insurance commissioner Matthew Denn decided to run for Lieutenant Governor of Delaware rather than reelection to his office, and Weldin Stewart won the three-way primary election to replace him as the Democratic nominee. In the general election, Weldin Stewart was elected to office with 57 percent of the vote over Republican John Brady. She was reelected in 2012. In 2016, Weldin Stewart ran for reelection but was defeated in the Democratic primary by Trinidad Navarro.

== Electoral history ==
- In 2000, Weldin Stewart was defeated in the general election for insurance commission by incumbent Republican Donna Williams.
- In 2004, Weldin Stewart was defeated in the Democratic primary election by Matthew Denn.
- In 2008, Weldin Stewart won the three-way Democratic primary with 42 percent of the vote. She went on to win the general election with 58 percent of the vote, including under both the Democratic Party and the Working Families Party.
- In 2012, Weldin Stewart won the four-way Democratic primary with 33 percent of the vote. She went on to win the general election with 61 percent of the vote.
- In 2016, Weldin Stewart lost the Democratic primary to Trinidad Navarro.
