= 2012 Delaware lieutenant gubernatorial election =

2012 Delaware Lieutenant gubernatorial election
- November 6, 2012
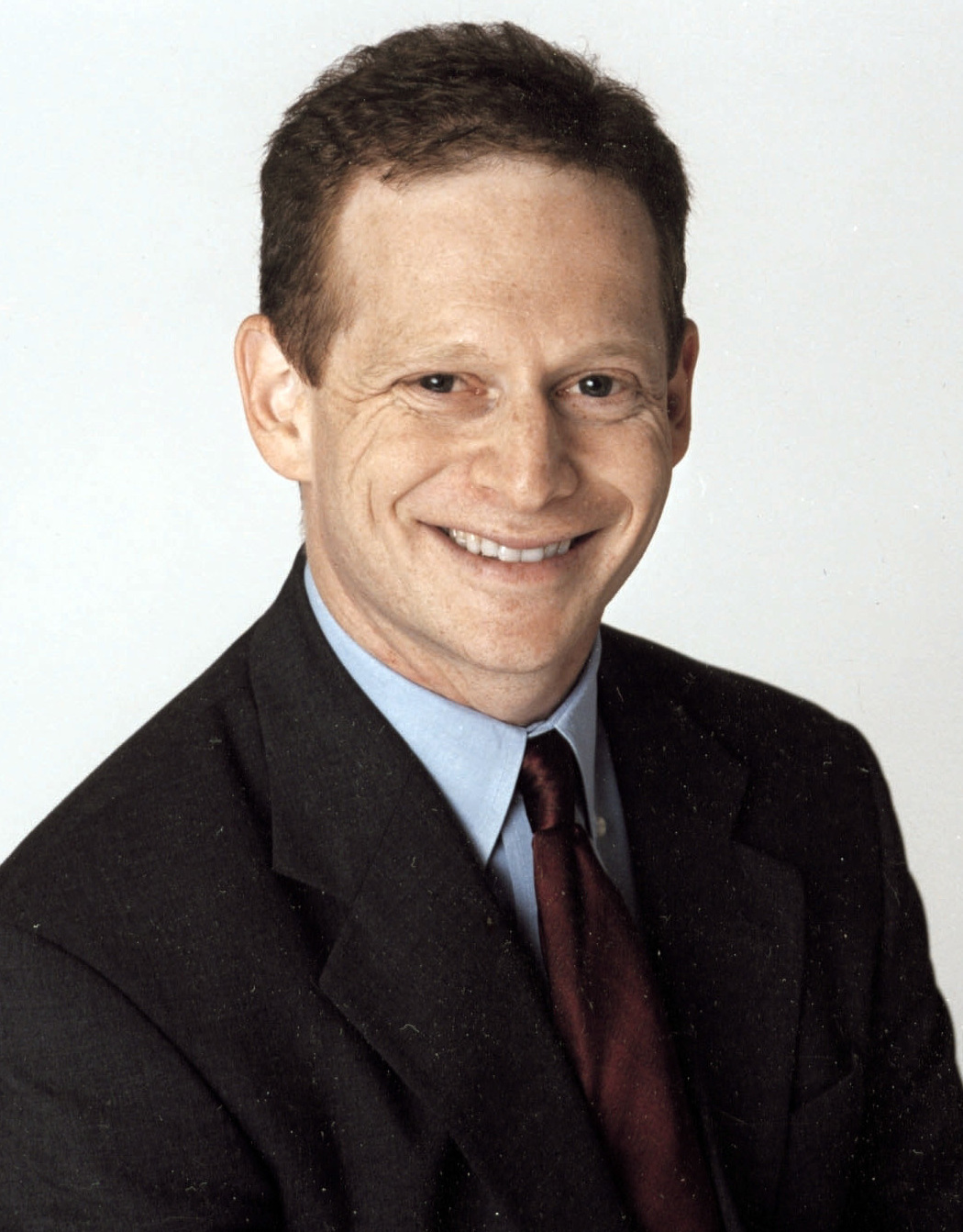

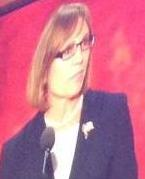
Nominee	Matthew Denn	Sher Valenzuela
Party	Democratic	Republican
Popular vote	238,957	143,978
Percentage	61.56%	37.09%
- Denn: 50–60% 60–70% 70–80% 80–90% Valenzuela: 50–60%
Lieutenant Governor before election
Matthew Denn
Democratic
Elected Lieutenant Governor
Matthew Denn
Democratic

The 2012 Delaware lieutenant gubernatorial election was held on November 6, 2012, coinciding with the Delaware gubernatorial election. Democratic incumbent Lieutenant Governor Matthew Denn was elected to a second term, defeating Republican nominee Sher Valenzuela in a landslide.

== Candidates ==
=== Democratic Party ===
- Matthew Denn, incumbent Lieutenant Governor

=== Republican Party ===
- Sher Valenzuela

=== Libertarian Party ===
- Margaret McKeown

== General election ==
=== Results ===
Delaware lieutenant gubernatorial election, 2012
Party	Candidate	Votes	%
Democratic	Matthew Denn (incumbent)	238,957	61.56%
Republican	Sher Valenzuela	143,978	37.09%
Libertarian	Margaret McKeown	5,206	1.35%
Total votes		388,141	100.00%
Democratic hold			

Counties that flipped from Democratic to Republican

- Sussex (largest city: Seaford)

== See also ==
- 2012 Delaware gubernatorial election
