= 2012 United States House of Representatives election in Delaware =

- November 6, 2012
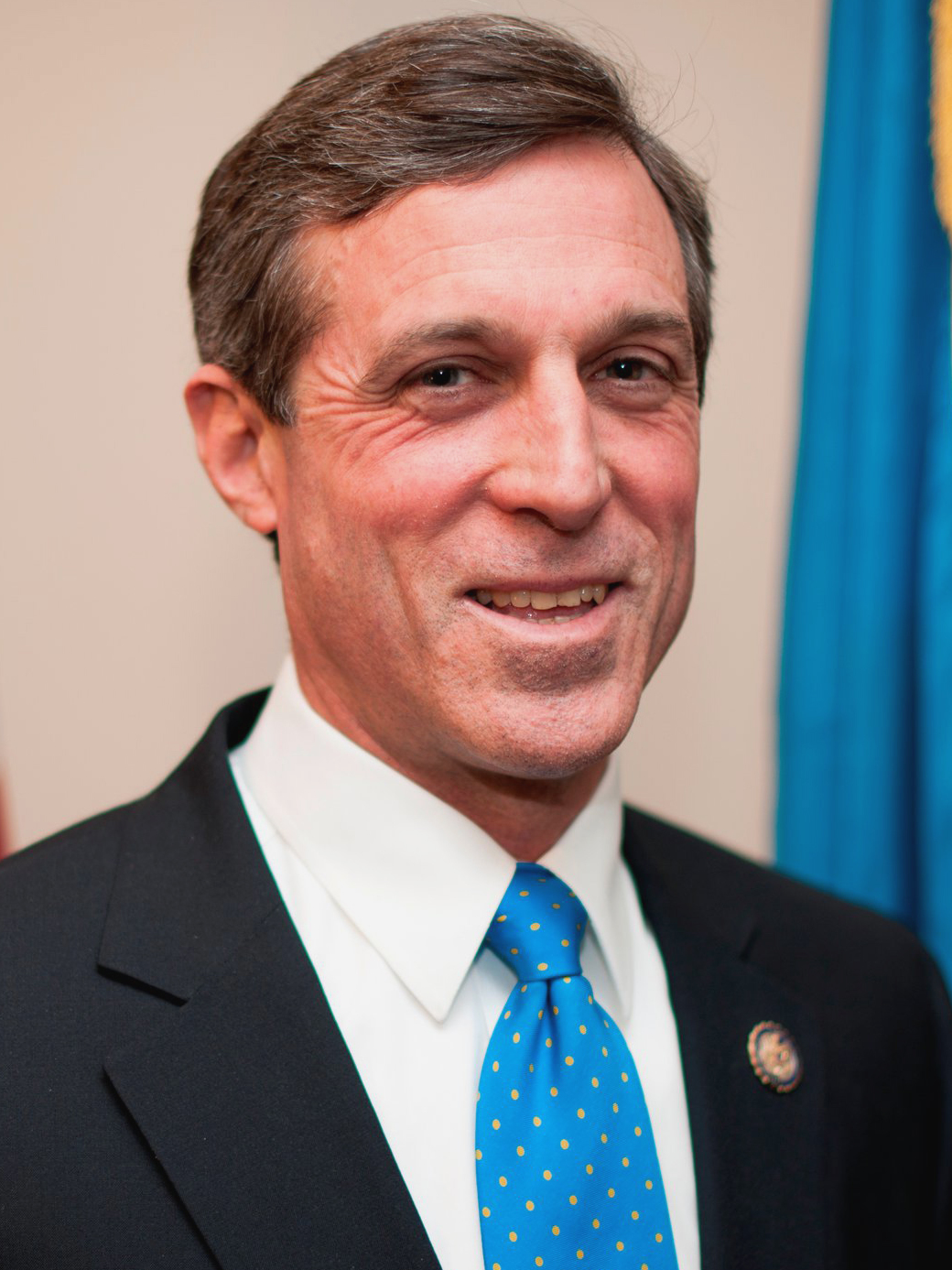

| Nominee | John Carney | Tom Kovach |
| Party | Democratic | Republican |
| Popular vote | 249,933 | 129,757 |
| Percentage | 64.40% | 33.44% |
- Carney: 40–50% 50–60% 60–70% 70–80% 80–90% >90% Kovach: 50–60%
U.S. Representative before election
John Carney
Democratic
Elected U.S. Representative
John Carney
Democratic

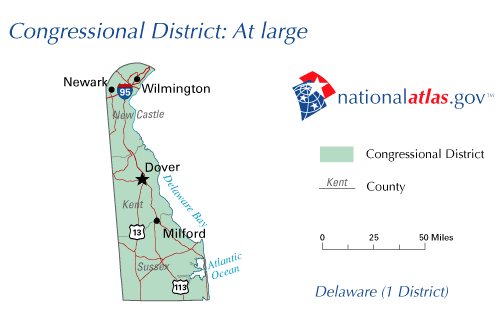
Map of Delaware's at-large congressional district

The 2012 United States House of Representatives election in Delaware took place on Tuesday, November 6, 2012. Voters elected a member of the United States House of Representatives to represent Delaware's at-large congressional district, encompassing the entire state of Delaware. Incumbent Democratic Representative John Carney defeated Republican challenger Tom Kovach to win a second term.

== Democratic nomination ==
=== Candidates ===
==== Nominee ====
- John Carney, incumbent U.S. Representative

== Republican nomination ==
=== Candidates ===
==== Nominee ====
- Tom Kovach, New Castle County Council president

==== Eliminated in primary ====
- Rose Izzo, conservative freelance political consultant and candidate for the seat in 2010

=== Results ===
Republican primary results
| Party | Candidate | Votes | % |
|---|---|---|---|
| Republican | Tom Kovach | 15,018 | 65.6 |
| Republican | Rose Izzo | 7,888 | 34.4 |
| Total votes | | 22,906 | 100 |

== General election ==
=== Candidates ===
- Bernie August (Green)
- John Carney (D), incumbent U.S. Representative
- Scott Gesty (L), accountant. Gesty has also been endorsed by the Independent Party of Delaware
- Tom Kovach (R), New Castle County Council president

==== Predictions ====
| Source | Ranking | As of |
|---|---|---|
| The Cook Political Report | Safe D | November 5, 2012 |
| Rothenberg | Safe D | November 2, 2012 |
| Roll Call | Safe D | November 4, 2012 |
| Sabato's Crystal Ball | Safe D | November 5, 2012 |
| NY Times | Safe D | November 4, 2012 |
| RCP | Safe D | November 4, 2012 |
| The Hill | Safe D | November 4, 2012 |

=== Results ===
Delaware's at-large congressional district, 2012
| Party | Candidate | Votes | % | ±% |
|---|---|---|---|---|
| Democratic | John Carney (incumbent) | 249,933 | 64.40% | +7.62% |
| Republican | Tom Kovach | 129,757 | 33.44% | −7.60% |
| Green | Bernard August | 4,273 | 1.10% | N/A |
| Libertarian | Scott Gesty | 4,096 | 1.06% | +0.41% |
| Total votes | | 388,059 | 100.0% | |
| Democratic hold | | | | |

==== By county ====
| County | John Carney Democratic | | Thomas Kovach Republican | | All Others | |
| County | # | % | # | % | # | % |
|---|---|---|---|---|---|---|
| New Castle | 165,723 | 70.26% | 65,066 | 27.59% | 5,077 | 2.15% |
| Kent | 38,044 | 59.31% | 24,623 | 38.39% | 1,475 | 2.3% |
| Sussex | 46,166 | 52.43% | 40,068 | 45.51% | 1,817 | 2.06% |
| Totals | 249,933 | 64.41% | 129,757 | 33.44% | 8,369 | 2.16% |

Counties that flipped from Republican to Democratic

- Kent (largest city: Dover)
- Sussex (largest city: Seaford)
