= Tom Kovach =

American politician

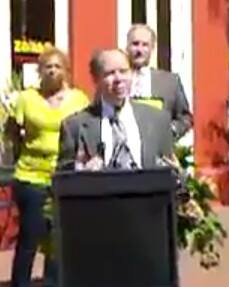

President of the New Castle County Council
- In office January 2011 – 2012
- Preceded by: Paul Clark

Member of the Delaware House of Representatives from the 6th district
- In office January 2009 – January 2011
- Preceded by: Diana McWilliams
- Succeeded by: Debra Heffernan

Personal details
- Born: Thomas H. Kovach; May 27, 1969 (age 57) Woodbury, New Jersey, U.S.
- Party: Republican
- Children: 3
- Education: University of Delaware (BA, BS); Rutgers University (JD)

Thomas H. Kovach (born May 27, 1969) is an American attorney and politician who served in the Delaware House of Representatives from 2009 to 2011 and as the president of the New Castle County Council from 2011 to 2012. A Republican, he ran for the United States House of Representatives seat for Delaware's at-large congressional district in 2012, and lost to incumbent John Carney.

== Early life and education ==
Kovach was born in Woodbury, New Jersey, but grew up in northern Delaware, where he became an Eagle Scout. He earned undergraduate degrees in chemical engineering and psychology from the University of Delaware in 1992, and went to work for the Environmental Protection Agency as an enforcement officer before receiving a J.D. degree from Rutgers Law School five years later.

He was a member of the Aspen-Rodel Fellowship in Public Leadership.

== Career ==
Kovach practiced environmental law and commercial litigation prior to seeking elected office.

=== State representative ===
Immediately after the 2008 elections, Democrat Diana McWilliams announced that she would be resigning her office. Governor Ruth Ann Minner announced a special election five days before Christmas to fill the seat. Kovach won an upset victory and came into office with the 2008 class. He sat on the Education, Energy and Veterans Affairs Committees, among others. He sponsored legislation to make state government more transparent and also tried to move school board elections to coincide with general elections in order to save money and increase voter participation. He lost reelection during the 2010 election by 400 votes.

=== New Castle County President ===
Following the election of New Castle County Executive Chris Coons to the U.S. Senate, New Castle County President Paul Clark was elevated to fill the remainder of his term. This left a vacancy in the office of the presidency, and a special election was called for January 2011. Kovach was chosen as the Republican candidate for this position, running against county councilman Tim Sheldon, a Democrat. He won the election with 57% of the vote, making him the first member of his party to win this office in 23 years. As president, Kovach has worked to promote transparency and decrease the size of county government. During a State of the County address by New Castle County Executive Paul Clark in 2012, Kovach suggested more work be done to reduce the costs of county services.

=== U.S. House campaign ===
In October 2011, Kovach announced that he would run for U.S. Congress. He faced Rose Izzo in the Republican primary. Kovach defeated Izzo in the primary and faced Democratic freshman Representative John Carney. During a debate with Carney, Kovach criticized government regulations as harming jobs, saying, "Government needs to get out of the way." He opposed the Affordable Care Act and criticized stimulus packages as failing to "address the fundamental problems" with the economy. He also supported a better energy policy and spending less overseas as means of bringing down budget deficits. He went on to lose the election to Carney, receiving 33% of the vote.

== Election results ==
Election results
Year	Office	Election	Subject	Party	Votes	%	Opponent	Party	Votes	%
2008	State House 6th district	Special	Tom Kovach	Republican	1,540	51.2%	Michael Migliore	Democrat	1,467	48.8%
2010	State House 6th district	General	Tom Kovach	Republican	3,856	46.9%	Debra Heffernan	Democrat	4,263	51.9%
2011	New Castle County President	Special	Tom Kovach	Republican	16,721	57.5%	Tim Sheldon	Democrat	12,139	41.7%
2012	Congress, Delaware at-large	Primary	Tom Kovach	Republican	15,018	65.6%	Rose Izzo	Republican	7,888	34.4%
2012	Congress, Delaware at-large	General	Tom Kovach	Republican	129,749	33%	John Carney	Democrat	249,905	64%

== Personal life ==
Kovach has three children. Kovach has also served as an assistant scoutmaster, and coaches youth soccer, and serves on the Board of Goodwill and the Boy Scouts.
