= 2010 United States House of Representatives election in Delaware =

- November 2, 2010
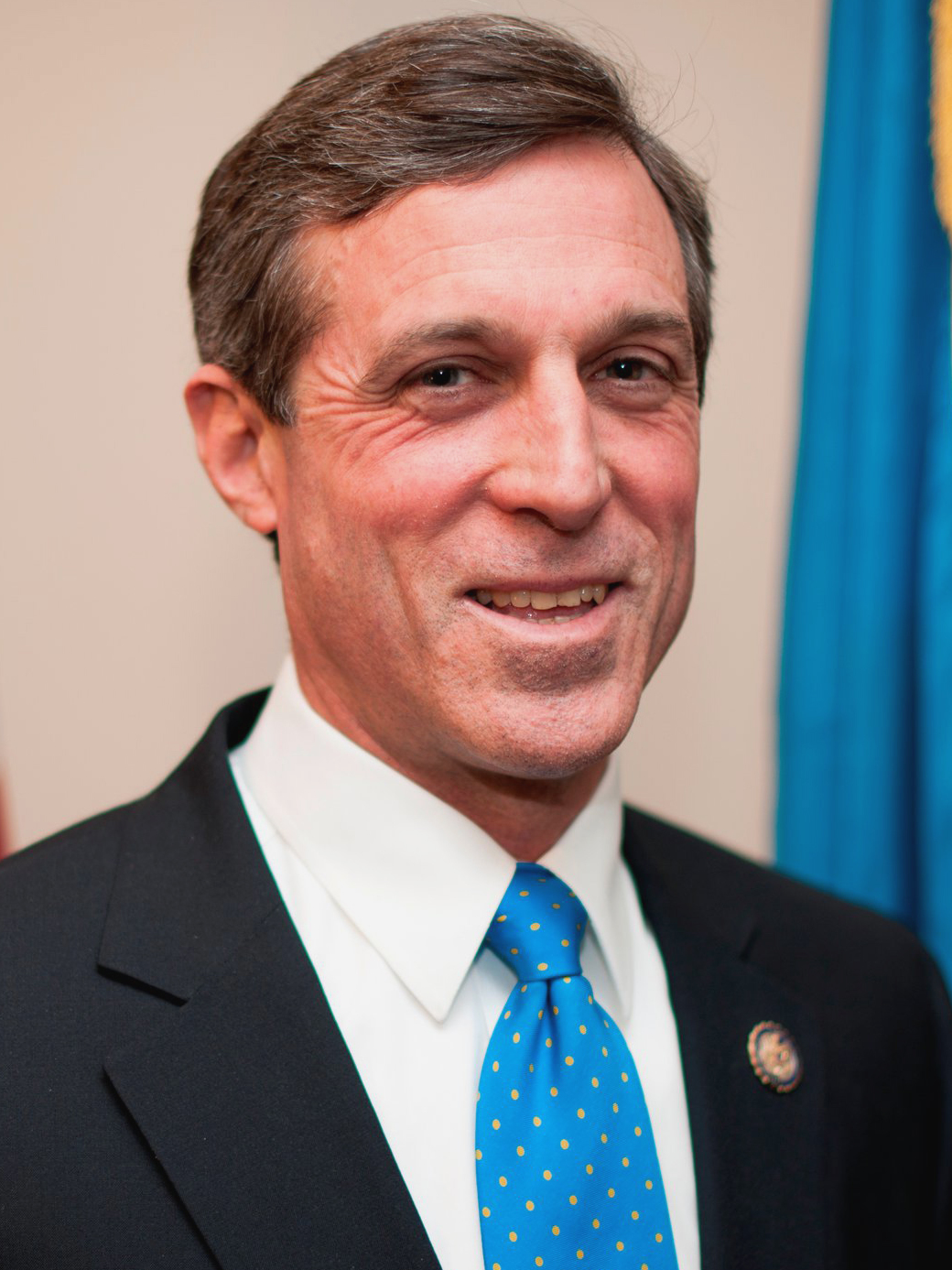

Nominee	John Carney	Glen Urquhart
Party	Democratic	Republican
Popular vote	173,543	125,442
Percentage	56.78%	41.04%
- Carney: 50–60% 60–70% 70–80% 80–90% >90% Urquhart: 50–60% 60–70%
U.S. Representative before election
Mike Castle
Republican
Elected U.S. Representative
John Carney
Democratic

The 2010 United States House of Representatives election in Delaware was held on November 2, 2010, to determine who would represent the state of Delaware in the United States House of Representatives for the 112th United States Congress. Democratic nominee former Lieutenant Governor, John Carney defeated Republican nominee Glen Urquhart, giving Delaware an all Democratic congressional delegation for the first time since before the 1942 midterms. This is the first open-seat election since 1992 and only the second since 1976.

== Background ==
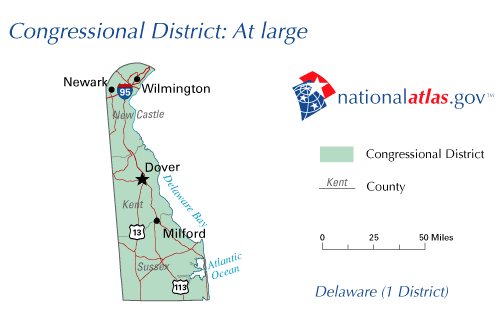
Map of Delaware's at-large congressional district

The state of Delaware is completely contained in a single at-large district. The district has a Cook Partisan Voting Index of D+7. Since 1993, the district had been represented by Republican Michael Castle.

Castle announced in 2009 he would run for the United States Senate seat held by Ted Kaufman (D) who had been appointed to the seat when his predecessor, Joe Biden (D), resigned to become Vice President. Castle was defeated by Christine O'Donnell in the Delaware Republican Senate primary.

== Democratic primary ==
=== Candidates ===
- John Carney, former Lieutenant Governor of Delaware

=== Results ===
Carney announced his candidacy on April 15, 2009, and was unopposed in the primary after Scott Spencer, a transportation consultant, dropped out.

== Republican primary ==
=== Candidates ===
- Glen Urquhart, businessman
- Michele Rollins, businesswoman and former Miss District of Columbia USA and former Miss World America 1963
- Rose Izzo, columnist

=== Results ===
Republican primary results
Party	Candidate	Votes	%
Republican	Glen Urquhart	27,343	48.64
Republican	Michele Rollins	26,789	47.66
Republican	Rose Izzo	2,082	3.70
Total votes		56,214	100.00

== General election ==
=== Campaign ===
According to a September 2010 poll by Fairleigh Dickinson University's PublicMind, "likely voters in Delaware split 45%-40% on whether they prefer[ed] to have the U.S. Congress controlled by the Democratic Party or the Republican Party, suggesting that the First State's open congressional seat might be hotly contested," yet in the same poll, Carney led Urquhart by 51%-36%. Peter Woolley, the poll director, remarked that "candidates matter, not just parties" and that in Delaware candidates matter "more than in most states."

=== Polling ===
Poll source	Date(s) administered	Glen Urquhart (R)	John Carney (D)
Monmouth University	October 25–27, 2010	44%	51%
Fairleigh Dickinson	October 20–26, 2010	36%	53%
Monmouth University	October 8–11, 2010	44%	53%
Fairleigh Dickinson	September 27 – October 3, 2010	36%	51%
University of Delaware	September 16–30, 2010	31%	48%
Wilson Research Strategies	September 27–28, 2010	41%	45%
Grove Insight	September 15–18, 2010	32%	50%
Public Policy Polling	September 11–12, 2010	37%	48%
Public Policy Polling	August 7–8, 2010	30%	48%

=== Predictions ===
Source	Ranking	As of
The Cook Political Report	Likely D (flip)	November 1, 2010
Rothenberg	Lean D (flip)	November 1, 2010
Sabato's Crystal Ball	Lean D (flip)	November 1, 2010
RCP	Lean D (flip)	November 1, 2010
CQ Politics	Likely D (flip)	October 28, 2010
New York Times	Lean D (flip)	November 1, 2010
FiveThirtyEight	Safe D (flip)	November 1, 2010

=== Results ===
Delaware's at-large congressional district election, 2010
Party	Candidate	Votes	%
Democratic	John Carney	173,543	56.78
Republican	Glen Urquhart	125,442	41.04
Independent Party	Earl R. Lofland	3,704	1.21
Libertarian	Brent A. Wangen	1,986	0.65
Blue Enigma	Jeffrey Brown	961	0.31
Total votes		305,636	100.00
Democratic gain from Republican			

==== By county ====
County	John Carney Democratic		Glen Urquhart Republican		All Others	
County	#	%	#	%	#	%
New Castle	121,764	65.5%	60,404	32.5%	3,807	2.1%
Kent	23,173	47.3%	24,517	50.1%	1,263	2.6%
Sussex	28,606	40.5%	40,521	57.3%	1,581	2.2%
Totals	173,543	56.8%	125,442	41.0%	6,651	2.2%

Counties that flipped from Republican to Democratic

- New Castle (largest city: Wilmington)
