= 2010 Delaware Senate election =

- November 2, 2010

11 of the 21 seats in the Delaware Senate 11 seats needed for a majority

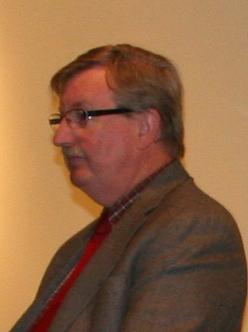
	Majority party	Minority party
Leader	Tony DeLuca	Gary Simpson
Party	Democratic	Republican
Leader since	January 8, 2009	January 8, 2009
Leader's seat	11th - Brookside	18th - Milford
Last election	16	5
Seats before	15	6
Seats won	7	4
Seats after	14	7
Seat change	▼1	▲1
Popular vote	84,446	55,933
Percentage	60.09%	39.80%
- Results: Republican gain Democratic hold Republican hold No election
President pro tempore before election
Tony DeLuca
Democratic
Elected President pro tempore
Tony DeLuca
Democratic

The 2010 Delaware Senate election was held on November 2, 2010, to elect 11 of the 21 members to Delaware's Senate. The election coincided with the elections for other offices, including the U.S. Senate, U.S. House of Representatives, and state house. The primary election was held on September 13, 2010.

== Results summary ==
District	Incumbent	Party	Elected Senator	Party
1	Harris McDowell III	Dem	Harris McDowell III	Dem
5	Catherine Cloutier	Rep	Catherine Cloutier	Rep
7	Patti Blevins	Dem	Patti Blevins	Dem
8	David Sokola	Dem	David Sokola	Dem
9	Karen Peterson	Dem	Karen Peterson	Dem
12	Dorinda Connor	Rep	Dorinda Connor	Rep
13	David McBride	Dem	David McBride	Dem
14	Bruce Ennis	Dem	Bruce Ennis	Dem
15	Nancy Cook	Dem	David Lawson	Rep
19	Joseph Booth	Rep	Joseph Booth	Rep
20	George Bunting	Dem	George Bunting	Dem

Party	Candi- dates	Votes		Seats		
Party	Candi- dates	No.	%	No.	+/–	%
Democratic	9	84,446	60.09%	14	▼1	66.67%
Republican	8	55,933	39.80%	7	▲1	33.33%
Working Families	1	165	0.12%	0	Steady	0.00%
Total	17 (Note: Catherine Cloutier was jointly nominated by the Republican Party and the Working Families Party.)	140,544	100%	21	Steady	100%

Popular vote
Democratic	60.09%
Republican	39.80%
Working Families	0.12%

Senate seats
Democratic	66.67%
Republican	33.33%

== Predictions ==
Source	Ranking	As of
Governing	Safe D	November 1, 2010

== Detailed results ==
Results of the 2010 Delaware Senate election by district:

=== District 1 ===
Incumbent Democrat Harris McDowell III has represented the 1st district since 1977.

Delaware Senate 1st district general election, 2010
Party	Candidate	Votes	%
Democratic	Harris McDowell III (incumbent)	11,862	100%
Total votes		11,862	100%
Democratic hold			

=== District 5 ===
Incumbent Republican Catherine Cloutier has represented the 5th district since 2001.

Delaware Senate 5th district general election, 2010
Party	Candidate	Votes	%
Republican	Catherine Cloutier (Note: Also nominated by the Working Families Party.) (incumbent)	7,814	54.93%
Democratic	Christopher Counihan	6,411	45.07%
Total votes		14,225	100%
Republican hold			

=== District 7 ===
Incumbent Democrat Patti Blevins has represented the 7th district since 1991.

Delaware Senate 7th district general election, 2010
Party	Candidate	Votes	%
Democratic	Patti Blevins (incumbent)	7,877	60.96%
Republican	Frederick Cullis	5,044	39.04%
Total votes		12,921	100%
Democratic hold			

=== District 8 ===
Incumbent Democrat David Sokola has represented the 8th district since 1991.

Delaware Senate 8th district general election, 2010
Party	Candidate	Votes	%
Democratic	David Sokola (incumbent)	8,572	60.56%
Republican	A. Louis Saindon	5,583	39.44%
Total votes		14,155	100%
Democratic hold			

=== District 9 ===
Incumbent Democrat Karen Peterson has represented the 9th district since 2003.

Delaware Senate 9th district general election, 2010
Party	Candidate	Votes	%
Democratic	Karen Peterson (incumbent)	8,008	71.47%
Republican	Robert Johnston	3,196	28.53%
Total votes		11,204	100%
Democratic hold			

=== District 12 ===
Incumbent Republican Dorinda Connor has represented the 12th district since 1997.

Delaware Senate 12th district general election, 2010
Party	Candidate	Votes	%
Republican	Dorinda Connor (incumbent)	9,110	100%
Total votes		9,110	100%
Republican hold			

=== District 13 ===
Incumbent Democrat Majority Leader David McBride has represented the 13th district since 1979.

Delaware Senate 13th district general election, 2010
Party	Candidate	Votes	%
Democratic	David McBride (incumbent)	8,736	100%
Total votes		8,736	100%
Democratic hold			

=== District 14 ===
Incumbent Democrat Bruce Ennis has represented the 14th district since 2007.

Delaware Senate 14th district general election, 2010
Party	Candidate	Votes	%
Democratic	Bruce Ennis (incumbent)	12,238	65.57%
Republican	John Moritz	6,427	34.43%
Total votes		18,665	100%
Democratic hold			

=== District 15 ===
Incumbent Democrat Nancy Cook has represented the 15th district since 1975. Cook lost re-election to Republican David Lawson.

Delaware Senate 15th district general election, 2010
Party	Candidate	Votes	%
Republican	David Lawson	8,370	52.34%
Democratic	Nancy Cook (incumbent)	7,623	47.66%
Total votes		15,993	100%
Republican gain from Democratic			

=== District 19 ===
Incumbent Republican Joseph Booth has represented the 19th district since winning a special election in 2009 to replace Democrat Thurman Adams Jr., who had died in office. Republican primary

Delaware Senate 19th district Republican primary election, 2010
Party	Candidate	Votes	%
Republican	Joseph Booth (incumbent)	2,157	51.43%
Republican	Eric Bodenweiser	2,037	48.57%
Total votes		4,194	100%

General election

Delaware Senate 19th district general election, 2010
Party	Candidate	Votes	%
Republican	Joseph Booth (incumbent)	10,554	100%
Total votes		10,554	100%
Republican hold			

=== District 20 ===
Incumbent Democrat George Bunting has represented the 20th district since 1997. Democratic primary

Delaware Senate 20th district Democratic primary election, 2010
Party	Candidate	Votes	%
Democratic	George Bunting (incumbent)	1,858	78.83%
Democratic	Perry Mitchell	499	21.17%
Total votes		2,357	100%

General election

Delaware Senate 20th district general election, 2010
Party	Candidate	Votes	%
Democratic	George Bunting (incumbent)	13,119	100%
Total votes		13,119	100%
Democratic hold			
