= 2000 Delaware Senate election =

- November 7, 2000

11 of the 21 seats in the Delaware Senate 11 seats needed for a majority
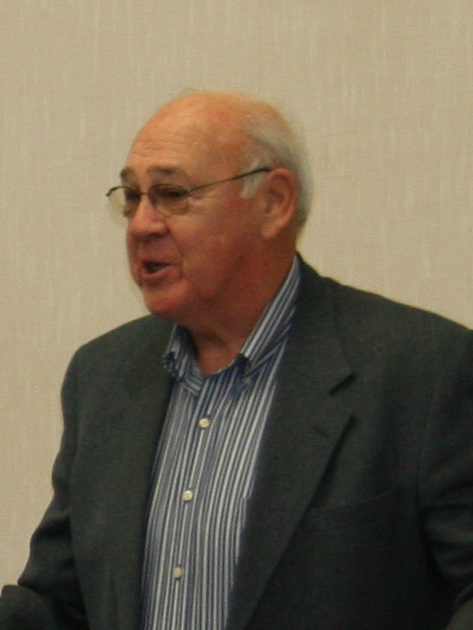

	Majority party	Minority party
Leader	Thomas Sharp	Steven Amick
Party	Democratic	Republican
Leader's seat	9th - Wilmington	10th - Newark
Last election	13	8
Seats won	9	2
Seats after	13	8
Seat change	Steady	Steady
Popular vote	111,070	50,974
Percentage	68.48%	31.43%
- Results: Democratic hold Republican hold No election
President pro tempore before election
Thomas Sharp
Democratic
Elected President pro tempore
Thomas Sharp
Democratic

The 2000 Delaware Senate election was held on November 7, 2000, to elect 11 of the 21 members to Delaware's Senate. The election coincided with elections for other offices, including for U.S. President, U.S. Senate, U.S. House of Representatives, Governor, Lieutenant Governor, and state house. The primary election was held on September 9, 2000.

== Results summary ==
District	Incumbent	Party	Elected Senator	Party
1	Harris McDowell III	Dem	Harris McDowell III	Dem
5	Myrna Bair	Rep	Catherine Cloutier	Rep
7	Patti Blevins	Dem	Patti Blevins	Dem
8	David Sokola	Dem	David Sokola	Dem
9	Thomas Sharp	Dem	Thomas Sharp	Dem
12	Dorinda Connor	Rep	Dorinda Connor	Rep
13	David McBride	Dem	David McBride	Dem
14	James Vaughn	Dem	James Vaughn	Dem
15	Nancy Cook	Dem	Nancy Cook	Dem
19	Thurman Adams Jr.	Dem	Thurman Adams Jr.	Dem
20	George Bunting	Dem	George Bunting	Dem

Party	Candi- dates	Votes		Seats		
Party	Candi- dates	No.	%	No.	+/–	%
Democratic	11	111,070	68.48%	13	Steady	61.90%
Republican	7	50,974	31.43%	8	Steady	38.10%
Constitution	1	138	0.09%	0	Steady	0.00%
Total	19	162,182	100%	21	Steady	100%

Popular vote
Democratic	68.48%
Republican	31.43%
Constitution	0.09%

Senate seats
Democratic	61.90%
Republican	38.10%

== Detailed results ==
Results of the 2000 Delaware Senate election by district:

=== District 1 ===
Incumbent Democrat Harris McDowell III has represented the 1st district since 1977.

Delaware Senate 1st district general election, 2000
Party	Candidate	Votes	%
Democratic	Harris McDowell III (incumbent)	8,970	63.63%
Republican	Lee Murphy	5,127	36.37%
Total votes		14,097	100%
Democratic hold			

=== District 5 ===
Incumbent Republican Myrna Bair has represented the 5th district and its predecessors since 1981. Bair didn't seek re-election and fellow Republican Catherine Cloutier won the open seat. Republican primary

Delaware Senate 5th district Republican primary election, 2000
Party	Candidate	Votes	%
Republican	Catherine Cloutier	1,529	68.57%
Republican	Michael Walsh II	701	31.43%
Total votes		2,230	100%

General election

Delaware Senate 5th district general election, 2000
Party	Candidate	Votes	%
Republican	Catherine Cloutier	8,099	52.16%
Democratic	William McGlinchey	7,428	47.84%
Total votes		15,527	100%
Republican hold			

=== District 7 ===
Incumbent Democrat Patti Blevins has represented the 7th district since 1991.

Delaware Senate 7th district general election, 2000
Party	Candidate	Votes	%
Democratic	Patti Blevins (incumbent)	10,047	67.88%
Republican	John Pasquale Jr.	4,755	32.12%
Total votes		14,802	100%
Democratic hold			

=== District 8 ===
Incumbent Democrat David Sokola has represented the 8th district since 1991.

Delaware Senate 8th district general election, 2000
Party	Candidate	Votes	%
Democratic	David Sokola (incumbent)	9,873	56.01%
Republican	Paul Welsh	7,755	43.99%
Total votes		17,628	100%
Democratic hold			

=== District 9 ===
Incumbent Democrat and President pro tempore Thomas Sharp has represented the 9th district since 1975.

Delaware Senate 9th district general election, 2000
Party	Candidate	Votes	%
Democratic	Thomas Sharp (incumbent)	10,189	100%
Total votes		10,189	100%
Democratic hold			

=== District 12 ===
Incumbent Republican Dorinda Connor has represented the 12th district since 1997.

Delaware Senate 12th district general election, 2000
Party	Candidate	Votes	%
Republican	Dorinda Connor (incumbent)	9,758	55.74%
Democratic	William McMurray	7,748	44.26%
Total votes		17,506	100%
Republican hold			

=== District 13 ===
Incumbent Democrat David McBride has represented the 13th district since 1979.

Delaware Senate 13th district general election, 2000
Party	Candidate	Votes	%
Democratic	David McBride (incumbent)	11,190	100%
Total votes		11,190	100%
Democratic hold			

=== District 14 ===
Incumbent Democrat James Vaughn has represented the 14th district since 1980.

Delaware Senate 14th district general election, 2000
Party	Candidate	Votes	%
Democratic	James Vaughn (incumbent)	15,899	100%
Total votes		15,899	100%
Democratic hold			

=== District 15 ===
Incumbent Democrat Nancy Cook has represented the 15th district since 1975.

Delaware Senate 15th district general election, 2000
Party	Candidate	Votes	%
Democratic	Nancy Cook (incumbent)	7,283	56.00%
Republican	David Burris	5,584	42.94%
Constitution	Rick Schroeter	138	1.06%
Total votes		13,005	100%
Democratic hold			

=== District 19 ===
Incumbent Democrat and President pro tempore Thurman Adams Jr. has represented the 19th district since 1973.

Delaware Senate 19th district general election, 2000
Party	Candidate	Votes	%
Democratic	Thurman Adams Jr. (incumbent)	9,808	100%
Total votes		9,808	100%
Democratic hold			

=== District 20 ===
Incumbent Democrat George Bunting has represented the 20th district since 1997. Republican primary

Delaware Senate 20th district Republican primary election, 2000
Party	Candidate	Votes	%
Republican	Gerald Hocker	2,538	77.88%
Republican	Thomas McCabe	721	22.12%
Total votes		3,259	100%

General election

Delaware Senate 20th district general election, 2000
Party	Candidate	Votes	%
Democratic	George Bunting (incumbent)	12,635	56.08%
Republican	Gerald Hocker	9,896	43.92%
Total votes		22,531	100%
Democratic hold			
