= 2020 Delaware Senate election =

- November 3, 2020

11 of the 21 seats in the Delaware State Senate 11 seats needed for a majority
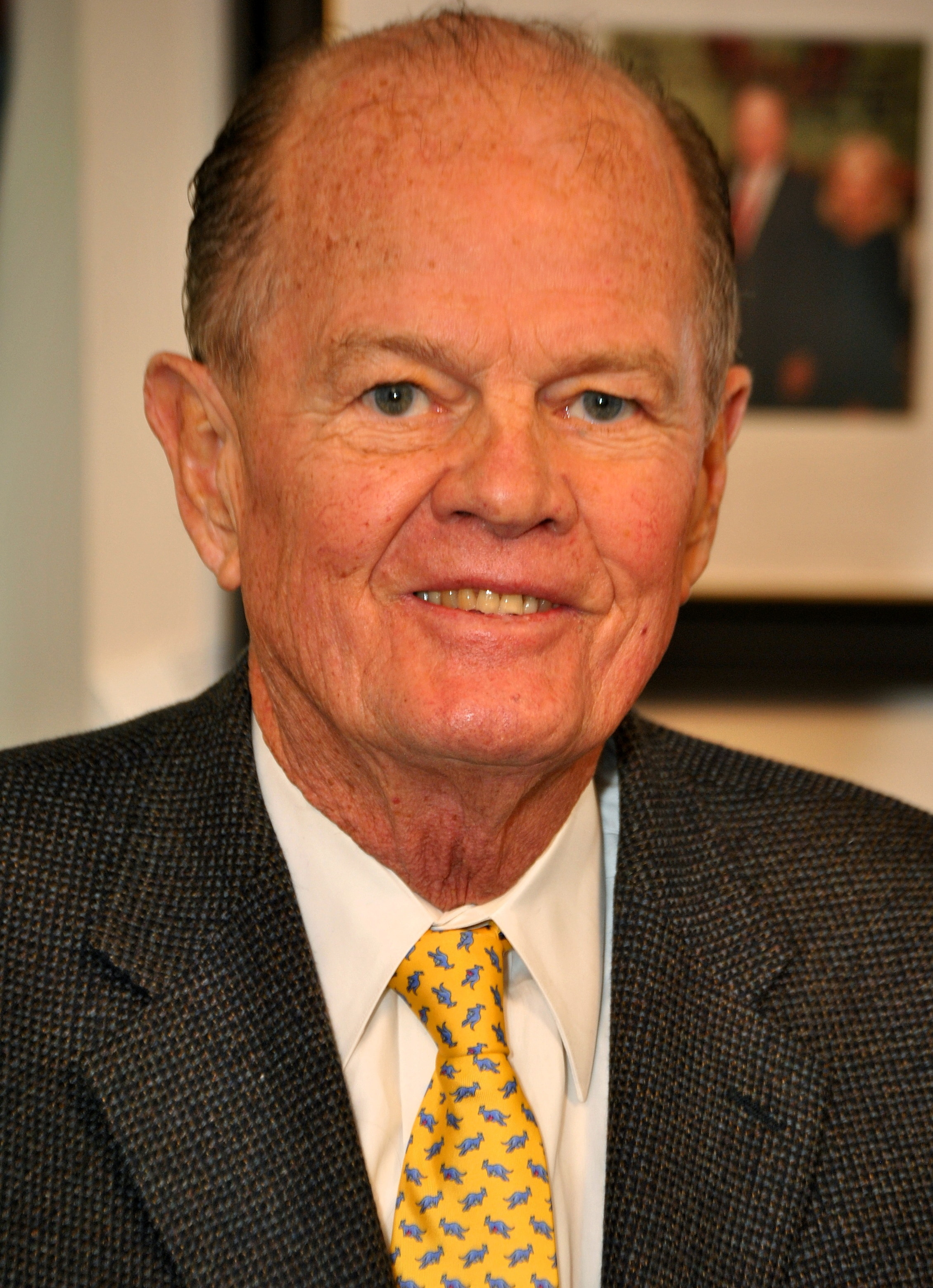

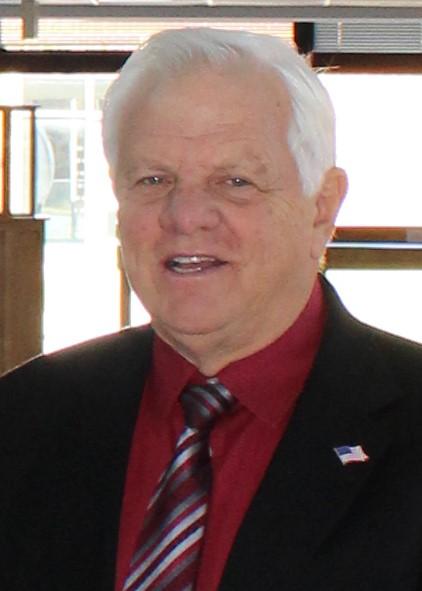
	Majority party	Minority party
Leader	David McBride (lost re-nomination)	Gerald Hocker
Party	Democratic	Republican
Leader since	January 17, 2017	January 8, 2019
Leader's seat	13th - New Castle	20th - Ocean View
Seats before	12	9
Seats won	14	7
Seat change	▲2	▼2
Popular vote	130,663	105,142
Percentage	55.41%	44.59%
- Results: Democratic gain Democratic hold Republican hold No election
President pro tempore before election
David McBride
Democratic
Elected President pro tempore
David Sokola
Democratic

The 2020 Delaware Senate election was held on November 3, 2020, concurrently with the elections for the Delaware House of Representatives, to elect members to the Delaware General Assembly. 11 of the 21 seats in the Delaware Senate were up for election. Primary elections were held on September 16, 2020.

Democrats increased their majority in the Senate by gaining two seats, winning 14 seats, compared to seven seats for the Republicans.

== Retirements ==
=== Democrats ===
1. District 1: Harris McDowell III retired.

== Incumbents defeated ==
=== In primary elections ===
1. District 13: Democrat David McBride lost renomination to Marie Pinkney, who went on to win the general election.

=== In the general election ===
1. District 5: Republican Catherine Cloutier was defeated by Democrat Kyle Evans Gay.
2. District 7: Republican Anthony Delcollo was defeated by Democrat Spiros Mantzavinos.

== Predictions ==
Source	Ranking	As of
The Cook Political Report	Likely D	October 21, 2020

== Results summary ==
=== Statewide ===
Summary of the November 3, 2020, Delaware Senate election results
Party	Candidates	Votes	%	Seats				
Party	Candidates	Votes	%	Before	Up	Won	After	+/–
Democratic	9	130,663	55.41	12	6	8	14	▲2
Republican	9	105,142	44.59	9	5	3	7	▼2
Total		235,805	100	21	11	11	21	Steady
Source: Delaware Elections Results, 2, 3

Popular vote
Democratic	55.41%
Republican	44.59%

Senate seats
Democratic	66.67%
Republican	33.33%

=== District ===
Results of the 2020 Delaware Senate election by district:

District	Democratic		Republican		Total		Result
District	Votes	%	Votes	%	Votes	%	Result
District 1	16,865	73.30%	6,144	26.70%	23,009	100.00%	Democratic hold
District 5	13,475	52.31%	12,283	47.69%	25,758	100.00%	Democratic gain
District 7	10,399	51.35%	9,851	48.65%	20,250	100.00%	Democratic gain
District 8	13,281	100.00%	-	-	13,281	100.00%	Democratic hold
District 9	12,728	67.07%	6,248	32.93%	18,976	100.00%	Democratic hold
District 12	21,606	100.00%	-	-	21,606	100.00%	Democratic hold
District 13	14,044	75.84%	4,475	24.16%	18,519	100.00%	Democratic hold
District 14	16,492	59.49%	11,229	40.51%	27,721	100.00%	Democratic hold
District 15	11,773	44.66%	14,587	55.34%	26,360	100.00%	Republican hold
District 19	-	-	16,324	100.00%	16,324	100.00%	Republican hold
District 20	-	-	24,001	100.00%	24,001	100.00%	Republican hold
Total	130,663	55.41%	105,142	44.59%	235,805	100.00%	

=== Closest races ===
Seats where the margin of victory was under 10%:

1. District 7, 2.8% gain
2. District 5, 4.6% gain

== Detailed results by senate district ==
=== District 1 ===
2020 Delaware's Senate general election, 1st district
Party	Candidate	Votes	%
Democratic	Sarah McBride	16,865	73.30%
Republican	Steve Washington	6,144	26.70%
Total votes		23,009	100.0%
Democratic hold			

=== District 5 ===
2020 Delaware's Senate general election, 5th district
Party	Candidate	Votes	%
Democratic	Kyle Evans Gay	13,475	52.31%
Republican	Catherine Cloutier (incumbent)	12,283	47.69%
Total votes		25,758	100.0%
Democratic gain from Republican			

=== District 7 ===
2020 Delaware's Senate general election, 7th district
Party	Candidate	Votes	%
Democratic	Spiros Mantzavinos	10,399	51.35%
Republican	Anthony Delcollo (incumbent)	9,851	48.65%
Total votes		20,250	100.0%
Democratic gain from Republican			

=== District 8 ===
2020 Delaware's Senate general election, 8th district
Party	Candidate	Votes	%
Democratic	David Sokola (incumbent)	13,281	100.00%
Total votes		13,281	100.00%
Democratic hold			

=== District 9 ===
2020 Delaware's Senate general election, 9th district
Party	Candidate	Votes	%
Democratic	Jack Walsh (incumbent)	12,728	67.07%
Republican	Todd Ruckle	6,248	32.93%
Total votes		18,976	100.00%
Democratic hold			

=== District 12 ===
2020 Delaware's Senate general election, 12th district
Party	Candidate	Votes	%
Democratic	Nicole Poore (incumbent)	21,606	100.00%
Total votes		21,606	100.00%
Democratic hold			

=== District 13 ===
2020 Delaware's Senate general election, 13th district
Party	Candidate	Votes	%
Democratic	Marie Pinkney	14,044	75.84%
Republican	Alexander M. Homich	4,475	24.16%
Total votes		18,519	100.00%
Democratic hold			

=== District 14 ===
2020 Delaware's Senate general election, 14th district
Party	Candidate	Votes	%
Democratic	Bruce Ennis (incumbent)	16,492	59.49%
Republican	Craig Pugh	11,229	40.51%
Total votes		27,721	100.00%
Democratic hold			

=== District 15 ===
2020 Delaware's Senate general election, 15th district
Party	Candidate	Votes	%
Republican	David G. Lawson (incumbent)	14,587	55.34%
Democratic	Jacqueline Hugg	11,773	44.66%
Total votes		26,360	100.00%
Republican hold			

=== District 19 ===
2020 Delaware's Senate general election, 19th district
Party	Candidate	Votes	%
Republican	Brian G. Pettyjohn (incumbent)	16,324	100.00%
Total votes		16,324	100.00%
Republican hold			

=== District 20 ===
2020 Delaware's Senate general election, 20th district
Party	Candidate	Votes	%
Republican	Gerald Hocker (incumbent)	24,001	100.00%
Total votes		24,001	100.00%
Republican hold			
