= 2000 Delaware House of Representatives election =

- November 7, 2000

All 41 seats in the Delaware House of Representatives 21 seats needed for a majority
	Majority party	Minority party
Leader	Terry Spence	Robert Gilligan
Party	Republican	Democratic
Leader's seat	18th- New Castle	19th - Wilmington
Last election	26	15
Seats won	26	15
Seat change	Steady	Steady
Popular vote	154,861	131,972
Percentage	53.88%	45.91%
- Results: Republican hold Democratic hold
Speaker before election
Terry Spence
Republican
Elected Speaker
Terry Spence
Republican

The 2000 Delaware House of Representatives election was held on November 7, 2000, to elect all 41 members of Delaware's House of Representatives. The election coincided with elections for other offices, including for U.S. President, U.S. Senate, U.S. House of Representatives, Governor, Lieutenant Governor, and state senate. The primary election was held on September 9, 2000.

== Results ==
District	Incumbent	Party	Elected Representative	Party
1st	Dennis Williams	Dem	Dennis Williams	Dem
2nd	Al Plant Sr.	Dem	Al Plant Sr.	Dem
3rd	Arthur Scott	Dem	Arthur Scott	Dem
4th	Joseph G. Di Pinto	Rep	Joseph G. Di Pinto	Rep
5th	Helene Keeley	Dem	Helene Keeley	Dem
6th	David Ennis	Rep	David Ennis	Rep
7th	Wayne Smith	Rep	Wayne Smith	Rep
8th	David Brady	Dem	David Brady	Dem
9th	Richard Cathcart	Rep	Richard Cathcart	Rep
10th	Robert Valihura Jr.	Rep	Robert Valihura Jr.	Rep
11th	Catherine Cloutier	Rep	Gregory Lavelle	Rep
12th	Deborah Hudson	Rep	Deborah Hudson	Rep
13th	John Van Sant III	Dem	John Van Sant III	Dem
14th	Richard DiLiberto	Dem	Richard DiLiberto	Dem
15th	Bruce Reynolds	Rep	Bruce Reynolds	Rep
16th	William Houghton	Dem	William Houghton	Dem
17th	Michael Mulrooney	Dem	Michael Mulrooney	Dem
18th	Terry Spence	Rep	Terry Spence	Rep
19th	Robert Gilligan	Dem	Robert Gilligan	Dem
20th	Roger Roy	Rep	Roger Roy	Rep
21st	Pamela Maier	Rep	Pamela Maier	Rep
22nd	Joseph Miró	Rep	Joseph Miró	Rep
23rd	Timothy Boulden	Rep	Timothy Boulden	Rep
24th	William Orbele Jr.	Rep	William Orbele Jr.	Rep
25th	Stephanie Ulbrich	Rep	Stephanie Ulbrich	Rep
26th	John Viola	Dem	John Viola	Dem
27th	Vincet Lofink	Rep	Vincet Lofink	Rep
28th	Bruce Ennis	Dem	Bruce Ennis	Dem
29th	Charles Welch III	Rep	Pamela Thornburg	Rep
30th	George Quillen	Rep	George Quillen	Rep
31st	Nancy Wagner	Rep	Nancy Wagner	Rep
32nd	Donna Stone	Rep	Donna Stone	Rep
33rd	Wallace Caulk Jr.	Rep	Wallace Caulk Jr.	Rep
34th	Gerald Buckworth	Rep	Gerald Buckworth	Rep
35th	J. Benjamin Ewing	Rep	J. Benjamin Ewing	Rep
36th	V. George Carey	Rep	V. George Carey	Rep
37th	John Schroeder	Dem	John Schroeder	Dem
38th	Shirley Price	Dem	Shirley Price	Dem
39th	Tina Fallon	Rep	Tina Fallon	Rep
40th	Clifford Lee	Rep	Clifford Lee	Rep
41st	Charles West	Dem	Charles West	Dem

=== Statewide ===
Party	Candi- dates	Votes	%	Seats	+/–
Republican	32	154,861	53.88%	26	Steady
Democratic	31	131,972	45.91%	15	Steady
Libertarian	2	347	0.12%	0	Steady
Natural Law	1	247	0.09%	0	Steady
Total	66	287,427	100%	41	Steady

Popular vote
Republican	53.88%
Democratic	45.91%
Libertarian	0.12%
Natural Law	0.09%

House seats
Republican	63.41%
Democratic	36.59%

== Detailed Results ==
Results of the 2000 Delaware House of Representatives election by district:

=== District 1 ===
Incumbent Democrat Dennis Williams has represented the 1st district since 1994.

Delaware House of Representatives 1st district general election, 2000
Party	Candidate	Votes	%
Democratic	Dennis Williams (incumbent)	5,946	100%
Total votes		5,946	100%
Democratic hold			

=== District 2 ===
Incumbent Democrat Al Plant Sr. has represented the 2nd district since 1975. Democratic primary

Delaware House of Representatives 2nd district Democratic primary election, 2000
Party	Candidate	Votes	%
Democratic	Al Plant Sr. (incumbent)	990	54.79%
Democratic	Beatrice Patton Carroll	510	28.22%
Democratic	Robert Brown	307	16.99%
Total votes		1,807	100%

General election

Delaware House of Representatives 2nd district general election, 2000
Party	Candidate	Votes	%
Democratic	Al Plant Sr. (incumbent)	4,380	100%
Total votes		4,380	100%
Democratic hold			

=== District 3 ===
Incumbent Democrat Arthur Scott has represented the 3rd district since 1994. Democratic primary

Delaware House of Representatives 3rd district Democratic primary election, 2000
Party	Candidate	Votes	%
Democratic	Arthur Scott (incumbent)	895	52.96%
Democratic	Herman Holloway Jr.	795	47.04%
Total votes		1,690	100%

General election

Delaware House of Representatives 3rd district general election, 2000
Party	Candidate	Votes	%
Democratic	Arthur Scott (incumbent)	4,780	100%
Total votes		4,780	100%
Democratic hold			

=== District 4 ===
Incumbent Republican Joseph G. Di Pinto has represented the 4th district since 1986.

Delaware House of Representatives 4th district general election, 2000
Party	Candidate	Votes	%
Republican	Joseph G. Di Pinto (incumbent)	4,330	58.64%
Democratic	Campbell Hay	3,054	41.36%
Total votes		7,384	100%
Republican hold			

=== District 5 ===
Incumbent Democrat Helene Keeley has represented the 5th district since 1996. Democratic primary

Delaware House of Representatives 5th district Democratic primary election, 2000
Party	Candidate	Votes	%
Democratic	Helene Keeley (incumbent)	1,189	64.73%
Democratic	Paul Falkowski	348	18.94%
Democratic	Linda Cannon	300	16.33%
Total votes		1,837	100%

General election

Delaware House of Representatives 5th district general election, 2000
Party	Candidate	Votes	%
Democratic	Helene Keeley (incumbent)	4,311	100%
Total votes		4,311	100%
Democratic hold			

=== District 6 ===
Incumbent Republican David Ennis has represented the 6th district since 1983.

Delaware House of Representatives 6th district general election, 2000
Party	Candidate	Votes	%
Republican	David Ennis (incumbent)	4,814	61.36%
Democratic	David Dennett	3,031	38.64%
Total votes		7,845	100%
Republican hold			

=== District 7 ===
Incumbent Republican Wayne Smith has represented the 7th district since 1990.

Delaware House of Representatives 7th district general election, 2000
Party	Candidate	Votes	%
Republican	Wayne Smith (incumbent)	4,697	100%
Total votes		4,697	100%
Republican hold			

=== District 8 ===
Incumbent Democrat David Brady has represented the 8th district since 1982.

Delaware House of Representatives 8th district general election, 2000
Party	Candidate	Votes	%
Democratic	David Brady (incumbent)	4,996	70.52%
Republican	Kenneth Turoczy	2,089	29.48%
Total votes		7,085	100%
Democratic hold			

=== District 9 ===
Incumbent Republican Richard Cathcart has represented the 9th district since 1998.

Delaware House of Representatives 9th district general election, 2000
Party	Candidate	Votes	%
Republican	Richard Cathcart (incumbent)	6,040	50.65%
Democratic	Bethany Hall-Long	5,885	49.35%
Total votes		11,925	100%
Republican hold			

=== District 10 ===
Incumbent Republican Robert Valihura Jr. has represented the 10th district since 1998.

Delaware House of Representatives 10th district general election, 2000
Party	Candidate	Votes	%
Republican	Robert Valihura Jr. (incumbent)	5,548	67.62%
Democratic	Thomas Popo	2,657	32.38%
Total votes		8,205	100%
Republican hold			

=== District 11 ===
Incumbent Republican Catherine Cloutier has represented the 11th district since 1998. Cloutier retired to run for the state senate and fellow Republican Gregory Lavelle won the open seat. Republican primary

Delaware House of Representatives 11th district Republican primary election, 2000
Party	Candidate	Votes	%
Republican	Gregory Lavelle	1,132	50.74%
Republican	Robert Rhodunda	655	29.36%
Republican	Jeffrey Cragg	444	19.90%
Total votes		2,231	100%

General election

Delaware House of Representatives 11th district general election, 2000
Party	Candidate	Votes	%
Republican	Gregory Lavelle	6,090	64.27%
Democratic	Steven Biener	3,386	35.73%
Total votes		9,476	100%
Republican hold			

=== District 12 ===
Incumbent Republican Deborah Hudson has represented the 12th district since 1994.

Delaware House of Representatives 12th district general election, 2000
Party	Candidate	Votes	%
Republican	Deborah Hudson (incumbent)	7,301	100%
Total votes		7,301	100%
Republican hold			

=== District 13 ===
Incumbent Democrat John Van Sant III has represented the 13th district since 1982.

Delaware House of Representatives 13th district general election, 2000
Party	Candidate	Votes	%
Democratic	John Van Sant III (incumbent)	5,839	100%
Total votes		5,839	100%
Democratic hold			

=== District 14 ===
Incumbent Democrat Richard DiLiberto has represented the 14th district since 1992.

Delaware House of Representatives 14th district general election, 2000
Party	Candidate	Votes	%
Democratic	Richard DiLiberto (incumbent)	5,161	100%
Total votes		5,161	100%
Democratic hold			

=== District 15 ===
Incumbent Republican Bruce Reynolds has represented the 15th district since 1988.

Delaware House of Representatives 15th district general election, 2000
Party	Candidate	Votes	%
Republican	Bruce Reynolds (incumbent)	4,945	100%
Total votes		4,945	100%
Republican hold			

=== District 16 ===
Incumbent Democrat William Houghton has represented the 16th district since 1982.

Delaware House of Representatives 16th district general election, 2000
Party	Candidate	Votes	%
Democratic	William Houghton (incumbent)	5,034	95.32%
Natural Law	Nancy Mattson	247	4.68%
Total votes		5,281	100%
Democratic hold			

=== District 17 ===
Incumbent Democrat Michael Mulrooney has represented the 17th district since 1998.

Delaware House of Representatives 17th district general election, 2000
Party	Candidate	Votes	%
Democratic	Michael Mulrooney (incumbent)	5,127	73.97%
Republican	Michael Shaw	1,804	26.03%
Total votes		6,931	100%
Democratic hold			

=== District 18 ===
Incumbent Republican and House Speaker Terry Spence has represented the 18th district and its predecessors since 1980.

Delaware House of Representatives 18th district general election, 2000
Party	Candidate	Votes	%
Republican	Terry Spence (incumbent)	3,931	58.20%
Democratic	Frances Anglin	2,823	41.80%
Total votes		6,754	100%
Republican hold			

=== District 19 ===
Incumbent Democrat and Minority Leader Robert Gilligan has represented the 19th district since 1972.

Delaware House of Representatives 19th district general election, 2000
Party	Candidate	Votes	%
Democratic	Robert Gilligan (incumbent)	5,658	100%
Total votes		5,658	100%
Democratic hold			

=== District 20 ===
Incumbent Republican Roger Roy has represented the 20th district since 1976.

Delaware House of Representatives 20th district general election, 2000
Party	Candidate	Votes	%
Republican	Roger Roy (incumbent)	7,709	100%
Total votes		7,709	100%
Republican hold			

=== District 21 ===
Incumbent Republican Pamela Maier has represented the 21st district since 1994.

Delaware House of Representatives 21st district general election, 2000
Party	Candidate	Votes	%
Republican	Pamela Maier (incumbent)	6,281	100%
Total votes		6,281	100%
Republican hold			

=== District 22 ===
Incumbent Republicans Joseph Miró has represented the 22nd district since 1998.

Delaware House of Representatives 22nd district general election, 2000
Party	Candidate	Votes	%
Republican	Joseph Miró (incumbent)	7,977	100%
Total votes		7,977	100%
Republican hold			

=== District 23 ===
Incumbent Republican Timothy Boulden has represented the 23rd district since 1994.

Delaware House of Representatives 23rd district general election, 2000
Party	Candidate	Votes	%
Republican	Timothy Boulden (incumbent)	3,388	54.09%
Democratic	Judith Hendricks	2,876	45.91%
Total votes		6,264	100%
Republican hold			

=== District 24 ===
Incumbent Republican William Orbele Jr. has represented the 24th district since 1976.

Delaware House of Representatives 24th district general election, 2000
Party	Candidate	Votes	%
Republican	William Orbele Jr. (incumbent)	4,528	100%
Total votes		4,528	100%
Republican hold			

=== District 25 ===
Incumbent Republican Stephanie Ulbrich has represented the 25th district since 1994.

Delaware House of Representatives 25th district general election, 2000
Party	Candidate	Votes	%
Republican	Stephanie Ulbrich (incumbent)	3,613	63.94%
Democratic	Goodwin Cobb IV	2,038	36.06%
Total votes		5,651	100%
Republican hold			

=== District 26 ===
Incumbent Democrat John Viola has represented the 26th district since 1998.

Delaware House of Representatives 26th district general election, 2000
Party	Candidate	Votes	%
Democratic	John Viola (incumbent)	6,054	73.96%
Republican	John Megahan	2,027	24.76%
Libertarian	Andrew Gregg	104	1.27%
Total votes		8,185	100%
Democratic hold			

=== District 27 ===
Incumbent Republican Vincet Lofink has represented the 27th district since 1990.

Delaware House of Representatives 27th district general election, 2000
Party	Candidate	Votes	%
Republican	Vincet Lofink (incumbent)	9,474	100%
Total votes		9,474	100%
Republican hold			

=== District 28 ===
Incumbent Democrat Bruce Ennis has represented the 28th district since 1982.

Delaware House of Representatives 28th district general election, 2000
Party	Candidate	Votes	%
Democratic	Bruce Ennis (incumbent)	5,340	95.65%
Libertarian	Terri Lewis	243	4.35%
Total votes		5,583	100%
Democratic hold			

=== District 29 ===
Incumbent Republican Charles Welch III has represented the 29th district since 1994. Welch didn't seek re-election and fellow Republican Pamela Thornburg won the open seat.

Delaware House of Representatives 29th district general election, 2000
Party	Candidate	Votes	%
Republican	Pamela Thornburg	4,028	56.04%
Democratic	Robert Everett II	3,160	43.96%
Total votes		7,188	100%
Republican hold			

=== District 30 ===
Incumbent Republican George Quillen has represented the 30th district since 1982.

Delaware House of Representatives 30th district general election, 2000
Party	Candidate	Votes	%
Republican	George Quillen (incumbent)	4,676	69.83%
Democratic	Pamela Darling	2,020	30.17%
Total votes		6,696	100%
Republican hold			

=== District 31 ===
Incumbent Republican Nancy Wagner has represented the 31st district since 1992.

Delaware House of Representatives 31st district general election, 2000
Party	Candidate	Votes	%
Republican	Nancy Wagner (incumbent)	5,135	100%
Total votes		5,135	100%
Republican hold			

=== District 32 ===
Incumbent Republican Donna Stone has represented the 32nd district since 1994.

Delaware House of Representatives 32nd district general election, 2000
Party	Candidate	Votes	%
Republican	Donna Stone (incumbent)	3,057	52.47%
Democratic	William Daisey	2,769	47.53%
Total votes		5,826	100%
Republican hold			

=== District 33 ===
Incumbent Republican Wallace Caulk Jr. has represented the 33rd district since 1984.

Delaware House of Representatives 33rd district general election, 2000
Party	Candidate	Votes	%
Republican	Wallace Caulk Jr. (incumbent)	4,535	61.94%
Democratic	Tommye Staley	2,787	38.06%
Total votes		7,322	100%
Republican hold			

=== District 34 ===
Incumbent Republican Gerald Buckworth has represented the 34th district since 1980.

Delaware House of Representatives 34th district general election, 2000
Party	Candidate	Votes	%
Republican	Gerald Buckworth (incumbent)	3,817	66.50%
Democratic	Mary Sherlock	1,923	33.50%
Total votes		5,740	100%
Republican hold			

=== District 35 ===
Incumbent Republican J. Benjamin Ewing has represented the 35th district since 1986.

Delaware House of Representatives 35th district general election, 2000
Party	Candidate	Votes	%
Republican	J. Benjamin Ewing (incumbent)	4,188	58.06%
Democratic	Richard Lindale	3,025	41.94%
Total votes		7,213	100%
Republican hold			

=== District 36 ===
Incumbent Republican V. George Carey has represented the 36th district since 1984.

Delaware House of Representatives 36th district general election, 2000
Party	Candidate	Votes	%
Republican	V. George Carey (incumbent)	5,352	64.37%
Democratic	Vance Daniels Sr.	2,962	35.63%
Total votes		8,314	100%
Republican hold			

=== District 37 ===
Incumbent Democrat John Schroeder has represented the 37th district since 1989.

Delaware House of Representatives 37th district general election, 2000
Party	Candidate	Votes	%
Democratic	John Schroeder (incumbent)	9,256	65.94%
Republican	Ruth Elizabeth Crystal	4,782	34.06%
Total votes		14,038	100%
Democratic hold			

=== District 38 ===
Incumbent Democrat Shirley Price has represented the 38th district since 1997.

Delaware House of Representatives 38th district general election, 2000
Party	Candidate	Votes	%
Democratic	Shirley Price (incumbent)	8,811	63.89%
Republican	Kenneth Sutton III	4,979	36.11%
Total votes		13,790	100%
Democratic hold			

=== District 39 ===
Incumbent Republican Tina Fallon has represented the 39th district since 1978.

Delaware House of Representatives 39th district general election, 2000
Party	Candidate	Votes	%
Republican	Tina Fallon (incumbent)	4,658	67.21%
Democratic	Michael McGroerty	2,273	32.79%
Total votes		6,931	100%
Republican hold			

=== District 40 ===
Incumbent Republican Clifford Lee has represented the 40th district since 1990.

Delaware House of Representatives 40th district general election, 2000
Party	Candidate	Votes	%
Republican	Clifford Lee (incumbent)	6,013	100%
Total votes		6,013	100%
Republican hold			

=== District 41 ===
Incumbent Democrat Charles West has represented the 41st district since 1979. Republican primary

Delaware House of Representatives 41st district Republican primary election, 2000
Party	Candidate	Votes	%
Republican	J. Scott Evans	694	56.15%
Republican	Ruth Briggs King	542	43.85%
Total votes		1,236	100%

General election

Delaware House of Representatives 41st district general election, 2000
Party	Candidate	Votes	%
Democratic	Charles West (incumbent)	4,610	60.14%
Republican	J. Scott Evans	3,055	39.86%
Total votes		7,665	100%
Democratic hold			
