= Senator Connor =

Senator Connor may refer to:

- Bob Connor (politician) (1938–1997), Delaware State Senate
- Dorinda Connor (1947–2024), Delaware State Senate
- Frank Connor (politician) (1916–1982), Washington State Senate
- Henry G. Connor (1852–1924), North Carolina State Senate
- Henry William Connor (1793–1866), North Carolina State Senate
- John Francis Connor (1903–1961), Arizona State Senate
- Martin Connor (born 1945), New York State Senate
- Nick Connor (1904–1995), Florida State Senate

== See also ==
- Senator Conner (disambiguation)
- Senator Connors (disambiguation)
