= Senator Bair =

Senator Bair may refer to:

- Myrna L. Bair (born 1940), Delaware State Senate
- Steve Bair (born 1958), Idaho State Senate
