= Salesianum School =

Catholic high school in Delaware, US

Salesianum

Location
- 1801 North Broom Street; Wilmington, Delaware 19802-2891; United States; 39°45′39″N 75°32′58″W

Information
- Type: Private
- Motto: Tenui Nec Dimittam (I have taken hold and will not let go.)
- Religious affiliations: Catholic (Oblates of St. Francis de Sales)
- Established: 1903 (123 years ago)
- CEEB code: 080195
- President: Tom Kardish
- Principal: Rev. Chris Beretta, O.S.F.S.
- Grades: 9–12
- Gender: Boys
- Enrollment: 924
- Colors: Gold and White
- Song: "In the Shadows of the Night"
- Athletics conference: Delaware Interscholastic Athletic Association
- Team name: Sallies / Sals
- Rival: St. Mark's
- Accreditation: Middle States Association of Colleges and Schools
- Newspaper: The Salesianum Review
- Yearbook: The Salesian
- Tuition: $21,200 (2025–2026)
- Website: www.salesianum.org

Salesianum School is a Catholic independent school for boys located in Wilmington, Delaware. It is run independently within the Diocese of Wilmington and is operated by the Oblates of St. Francis de Sales.

The current enrollment is about 930 students, declining from a peak of about 1,100 in recent years, from Delaware, Maryland, New Jersey, and Pennsylvania. Salesianum has established a close connection with Lycée Saint Michel, another Oblate high school, located in Annecy, France. Salesianum was named one of the Top 50 Catholic High Schools in America by the Catholic Honor Roll in 2004, 2007, 2008, 2009, and 2010.

== Campus ==
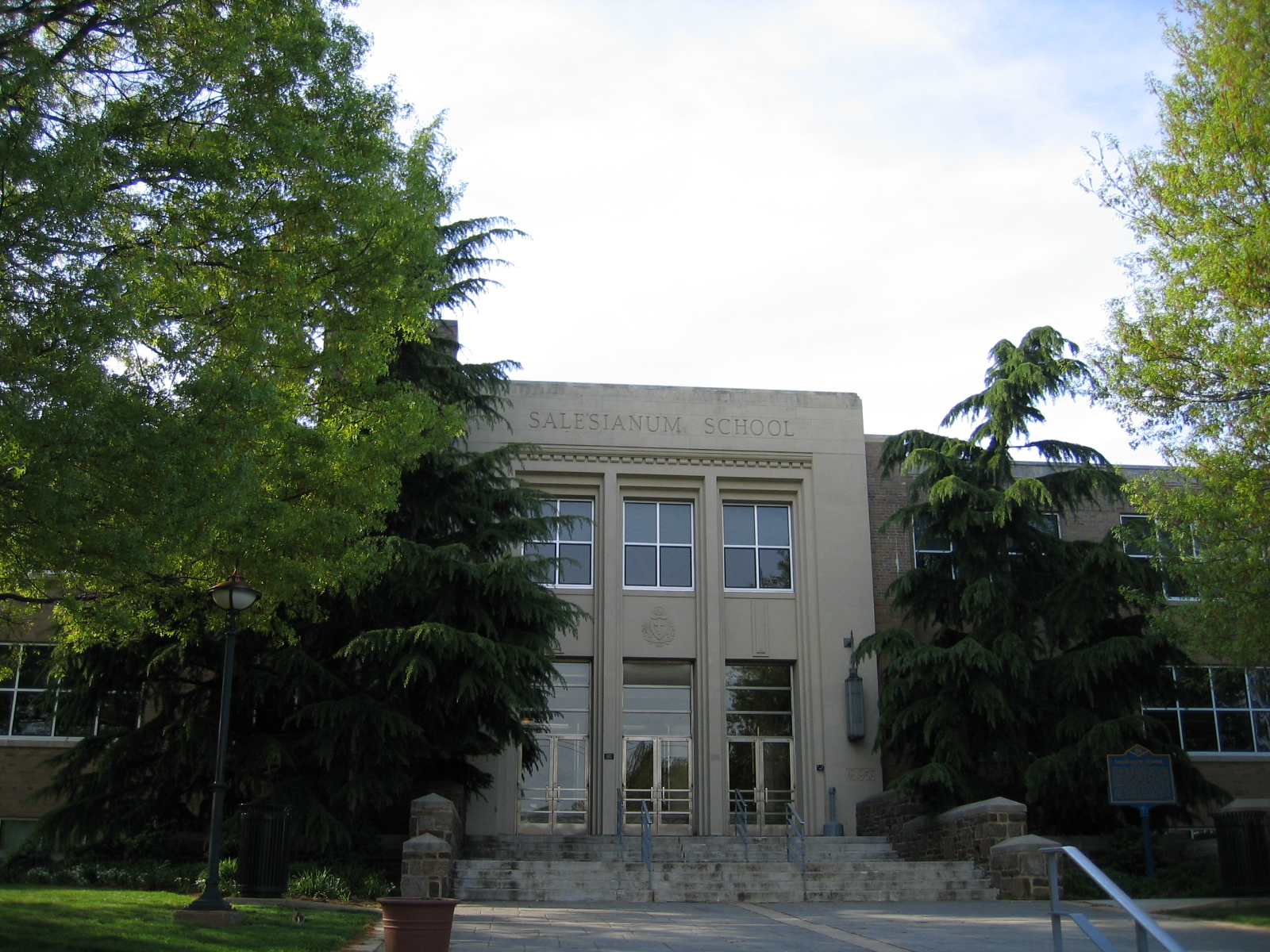
Front entrance

The 22-acre (89,000 m^{2}) campus is home to the school itself as well as a gymnasium. In addition to the campus, the athletic program also makes use of Wilmington's newly constructed Abessinio Stadium, formerly Baynard Stadium, which is located directly across from the school. In 2023, the school was given a $10 million donation by Anthony Fusco to build a new athletic facility.

== Athletics ==
Salesianum School has won 200 Delaware Interscholastic Athletic Association (DIAA) approved boys' state championships as of summer 2025, with particular success in cross country, swimming, lacrosse, and soccer. Salesianum won its first state championship in basketball, led by Donte DiVincenzo and Brian O'Neill (American football), in 2014 and latest one in 2023.

Salesianum's historical rival is St. Mark's High School, which is located in Newark, DE. Their fall meeting in football is commonly referred to as "The Holy War".

The soccer team won 11 state championships between 2002 and 2014, and in 2013 defeated Saint Benedict's Preparatory School, the top ranked high school program in the nation, on a game-winning goal scored by Joseph Dolce. They finished the season ranked as the number two high school team in the country. The 2016 soccer team finished the season ranked sixth in the nation by USA Today on its final Super 25 Expert Rankings.

The cross country team has won 37 of the 42 DIAA state boys' championships, losing only five years between 1972 and 2013.

The Salesianum swimming team has won ten consecutive state boys' championships between 2005 and 2015, and 11 of 12 from 2005 to 2017.

== History ==
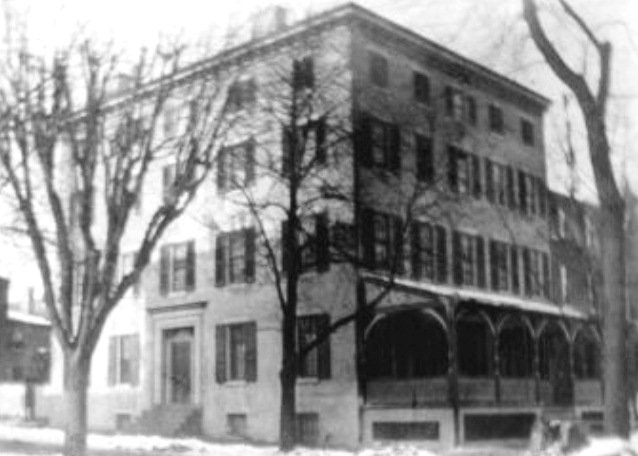
Original location – 8th & West Streets

Salesianum (Latin for "House of Sales", referring to St. Francis de Sales) was founded in 1903 and was located at 8th and West Streets until the move to its current location in 1957. In 1950, Rev. Thomas Lawless, OSFS, a 1908 graduate of Salesianum, admitted five African American students four years prior to the Brown v. Board of Education decision which made it mandatory, thus making Salesianum the first racially integrated school in the state of Delaware. The school was recognized for this with a historical marker.

In August 2012, the Wilmington/Philadelphia Province of the Oblates of St. Francis de Sales published a letter stating, "Since 2004, the Wilmington/Philadelphia Province of the Oblates of St. Francis de Sales has been named in lawsuits in the Superior Court of Delaware filed by 40 plaintiffs, each of which contained allegations of sexual abuse of a minor." The letter named 12 oblates who had been involved and expressed regrets, stating, "The abuse of children by priests and other clergy is shocking, reprehensible, and devastating to all whose trust has been shattered by their selfish deeds." This followed a settlement in August 2011 of 39 lawsuits against the school and the order, with the order and its insurers paying $24.8 million to be shared between the plaintiffs.

== Notable alumni ==
=== Academia ===
Name	Class year	Notability	References
Donald E. Pease	1963	Professor of English and comparative literature at Dartmouth College. Scholar on Dr. Seuss.	
F. Gregory Gause III	1976	Professor of International Affairs and Head of the International Affairs Department at the Bush School of Government and Public Service at Texas A&M.	

=== Arts, Entertainment, Media, and Literature ===
Name	Class year	Notability	References
Bernie McInerney	1954	actor	
Bill Press	1958	political commentator and talk radio host, chair of the California Democratic Party (1993–1996)	
Thomas Turcol	1971	1985 Pulitzer Prize winner for General News Reporting	
Bill Marsilii	1980	Screenwriter: 1999–2002: Courage the Cowardly Dog (writer; 6 episodes); 2006: Déjà Vu (screenwriter)	
Patrick Kenney	1986	professional wrestler	
David Acord	1989	Sound editor and voice actor best known for serving as supervising sound editor on Star Wars: The Force Awakens (2015). He received Academy Award and BAFTA nominations for his sound editing on The Force Awakens, and later earned a second Academy Award nomination for Star Wars: The Rise of Skywalker (2019), both shared with Matthew Wood. As a voice actor, Acord portrayed several Star Wars characters, including the stormtrooper FN-2199 ("TR-8R"), Imperial and stormtrooper voices in Star Wars Rebels, and the vocalizations of Grogu in The Mandalorian. In 2020, he received a Primetime Emmy for Outstanding Sound Editing for The Mandalorian episode "Chapter 1: The Mandalorian." In 2021, he won a Daytime Emmy for Outstanding Sound Mixing and Sound Editing for an Animated Program for the seventh season of Star Wars: The Clone Wars.	
Christopher Castellani	1990	Novelist: A Kiss from Maddalena, Algonquin Books, 2003; The Saint of Lost Things, Algonquin Books, 2005; All This Talk of Love, Algonquin Books, 2013; Leading Men, Viking Books, 2019; Last Seen, Viking Books, 2026	
Neil Casey	2000	Actor, writer, and comedian known for his work in television, film, and sketch comedy. He earned Primetime Emmy nominations for his writing on Saturday Night Live (2012–2013) and Inside Amy Schumer (2014), and has also written for Kroll Show before returning as a guest writer for Saturday Night Live in 2023. As an actor, he starred in the comedy series Other Space and Making History, and played the villain Rowan North in the 2016 Ghostbusters reboot.	

=== Business ===
Name / Class year / Notability / References; Miguel Bezos / 1963 / adoptive father of Jeff Bezos

=== Government ===
Name	Class year	Notability	References
William M. Duffy	1936	served as the President Judge of the Delaware Superior Court, the Chancellor of the Court of Chancery, and later as a Justice on the Delaware Supreme Court; co-author of The Supreme Court Until 1951: The "Leftover Judge" System and The Supreme Court of Delaware After 1951: The Separate Supreme Court	
Joseph T. Walsh	1948	Justice on the Delaware Supreme Court (1985–2005)	
Joseph diGenova	1963	United States Attorney for the District of Columbia (1983–1988)	
Orlando J. George Jr.	1963	Served in the Delaware House of Representatives from 1974 to 1995. President of Delaware Technical Community College from 1995 to 2014.	
Richard S. Gebelein	1964	Politician and jurist who served as the Attorney General of Delaware from 1979 through 1983, as a judge on the Delaware Superior Court from 1984 through 2005, and as an international judge in the Court of Bosnia and Herzegovina (2005–2006).	
E. James Burke	1967	Chief Justice of the Wyoming Supreme Court (2014–2018)	
Thomas P. Gordon	1971	Delaware law enforcement officer and politician: He was co-commander of the state's first serial killer task force which led to the apprehension and prosecution of Steven Brian Pennell, the only known serial killer in Delaware history. He eventually became Chief of Police of New Castle County Police Department, serving in the role for eight years. 7th New Castle County Executive (1997–2005). 10th New Castle County Executive (2012–2017).	
John F. Brady	1977	Delaware attorney and politician: Sussex County Register in Chancery (2001–2003), Sussex County Recorder of Deeds (2003–2011), Sussex County Clerk of Peace (2013–2017)	
Andre B. Bouchard	1979	Judge. Chancellor of the Delaware Court of Chancery from May 5, 2014 to May 6, 2021.	
Mark Toner	1982	26th Spokesperson for the United States Department of State (January 20, 2017 – April 24, 2017). United States ambassador to Liberia (August 7, 2024 – August 4, 2025)	
N. Christopher Griffiths	1998	Justice of the Delaware Supreme Court (2023 – present)	
Anthony Delcollo	2004	Republican member of the Delaware Senate representing District 7 (2016–2021)	

=== Military ===
Name	Class year	Notability	References
John F. R. Seitz	1925	Major General, United States Army. Commanded an infantry battalion at Schofield Barracks at Oahu, Hawaii, on December 7, 1941, during the Japanese attack on Pearl Harbor. Commanded the combat team at Omaha Beach during the Normandy landings on D-Day, in the breakout from Normandy and at the approach to close the gap in the Falaise Pocket. Recipient of the Silver Star. Buried in Arlington National Cemetery.	
James J. Connell	1957	Lieutenant commander in the United States Navy, recipient of the Navy Cross. POW in the Vietnam War. Delaware Aviation Hall of Fame inductee.	
Francis D. Vavala	1964	United States Army Lieutenant General and adjutant general for Delaware	
Hugh T. Broomall	1966	United States Air Force Major General	
Charles J. Dunlap Jr.	1968	Major General, United States Air Force JAG Corps; professor at Duke University law school	
Timothy Szymanski	1980	vice admiral, United States Navy. Commander of United States Naval Special Warfare Command in Coronado, California.	

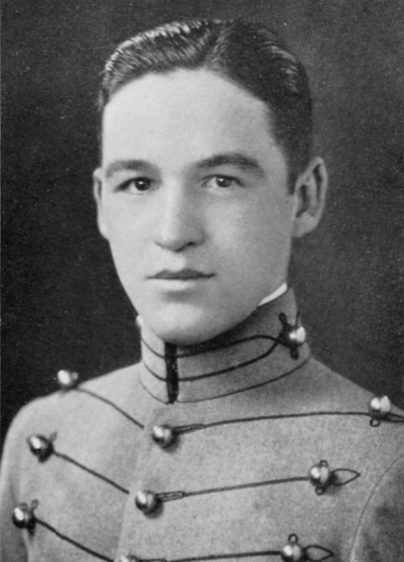
John F. R. Seitz

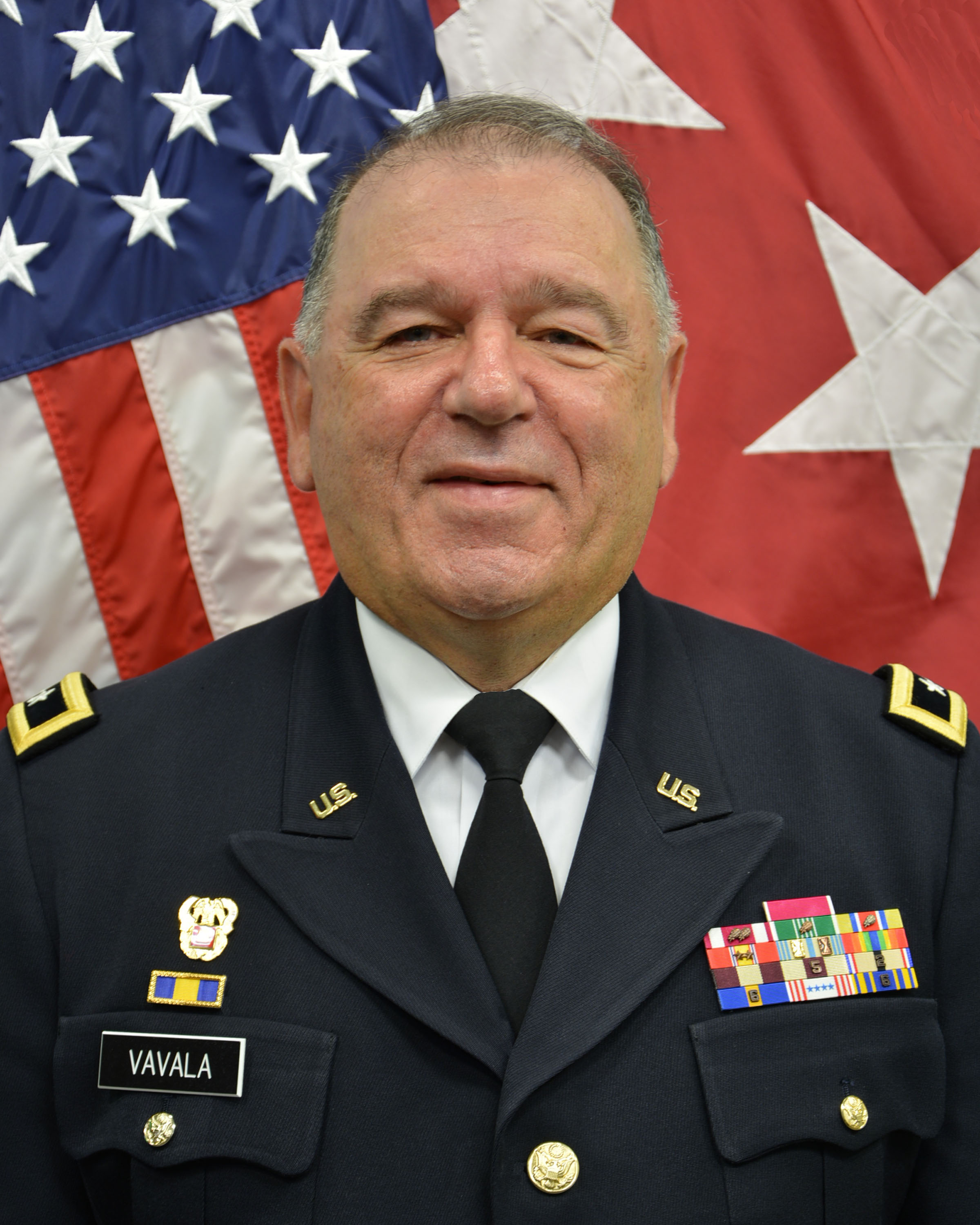
Francis D. Vavala

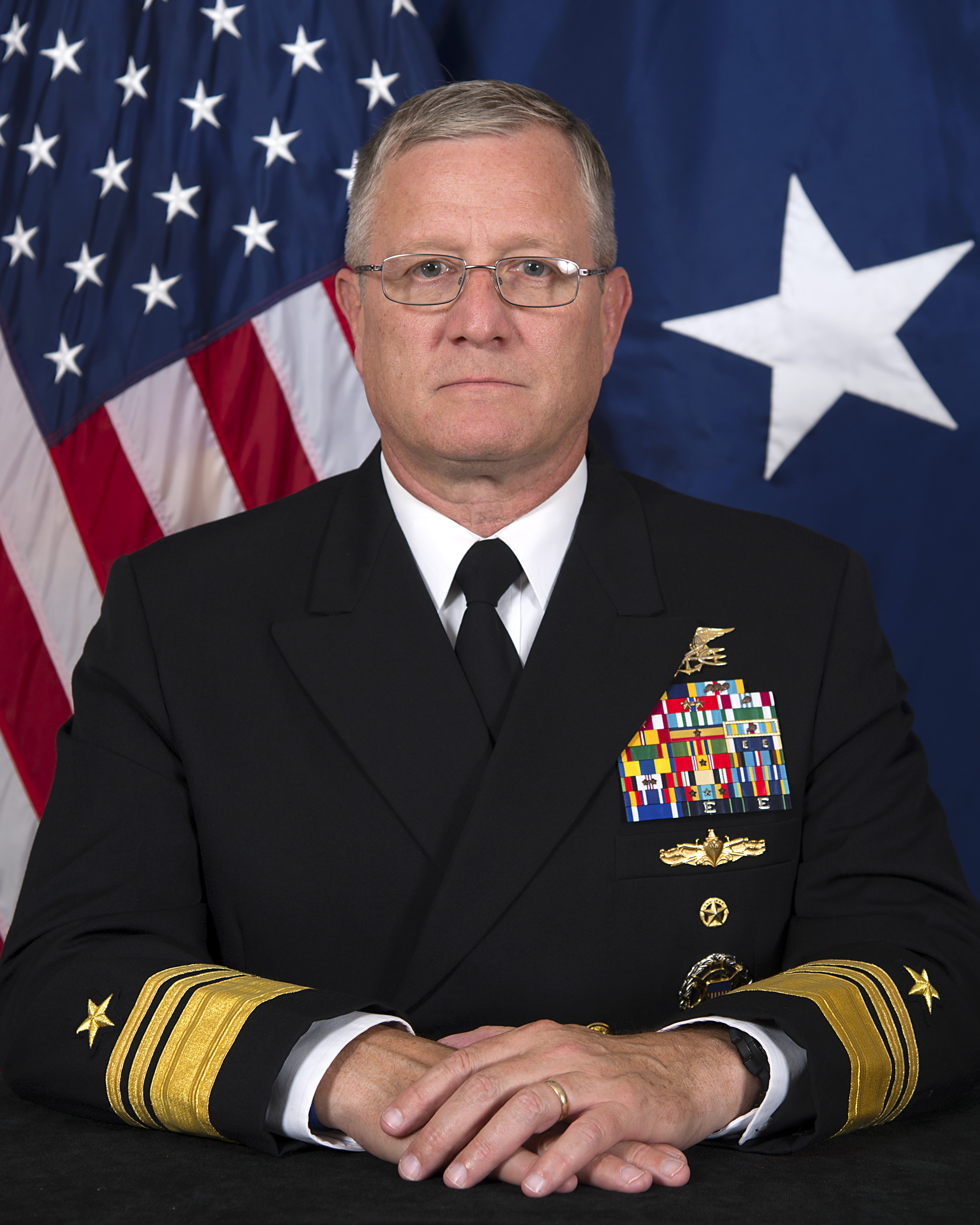
Timothy Szymanski

=== Science, Technology, Engineering, and Medicine ===
Name	Class year	Notability	References
John M. Byrne	1967	Distinguished Professor of Energy and Climate Policy at the University of Delaware. Contributed to Working Group III of the United Nations-sponsored Intergovernmental Panel on Climate Change (IPCC) since 1992. The panel was awarded the 2007 Nobel Peace Prize.	
Anthony Monaco	1977	His doctoral research led to his landmark discovery of the gene responsible for X-linked Duchenne and Becker muscular dystrophy. He subsequently completed a postdoctoral fellowship in London, where he worked on the Human Genome Project at the Imperial Cancer Research Fund (now Cancer Research UK), and subsequently a faculty position at the Institute of Molecular Medicine of the University of Oxford. Monaco identified the first gene specifically involved in human speech and language. 13th President of Tufts University (2011–2023).	

=== Sports ===
Name	Class year	Notability	References
Edward J. Michaels	1932	American professional football guard in the National Football League (NFL) for the Chicago Bears, Washington Redskins, and Philadelphia Eagles	
John Tosi	1933	NFL offensive lineman	
Dominic Montero	1938	Football coach at the University of Maryland (1967–1972). Inducted into the Delaware Sports Hall of Fame in 1978.	
Leon Dombrowski	1956	American football linebacker who played for one season in the American Football League (AFL). He played in one game for the New York Titans in 1960	
Victor Zwolak	1956	1964 Olympic runner	
Thomas F. Hall	1958	National Football League (NFL) wide receiver. He played for the Detroit Lions (1962–1963), Minnesota Vikings (1964–1966, 1968–1969), and New Orleans Saints (1967). Inducted into the Delaware Sports Hall of Fame in 1980.	
Edgar Johnson	1962	University of Delaware swimming and cross country coach and long serving Athletic Director from 1984–2009	
Ken Szotkiewicz	1965	MLB shortstop	
Kevin P. Reilly	1969	NFL linebacker. Inducted into the Delaware Sports Hall of Fame in 1985.	
Joseph Campbell	1973	NFL player, Super Bowl champion (XV) with Oakland Raiders.	
Michael Reed	1990	NFL player, defensive back coach at Clemson University	
Cesidio Colasante	1993	NPSL player	
Joe Hortiz	1994	general manager (GM) for the Los Angeles Chargers of the National Football League (NFL) (2024–present)	
Steve Casula	2005	NCAA football coach	
Andrew Szczerba	2007	NFL tight end	
Brian O’Neill	2014	NFL offensive lineman	
Troy Reeder	2014	NFL linebacker. Super Bowl champion (LVI) with the Los Angeles Rams.	
Donte DiVincenzo	2015	NBA player and 2021 NBA Champion with the Milwaukee Bucks	
Stephen Mallozzi	2019	NASCAR Camping World Truck Series driver	

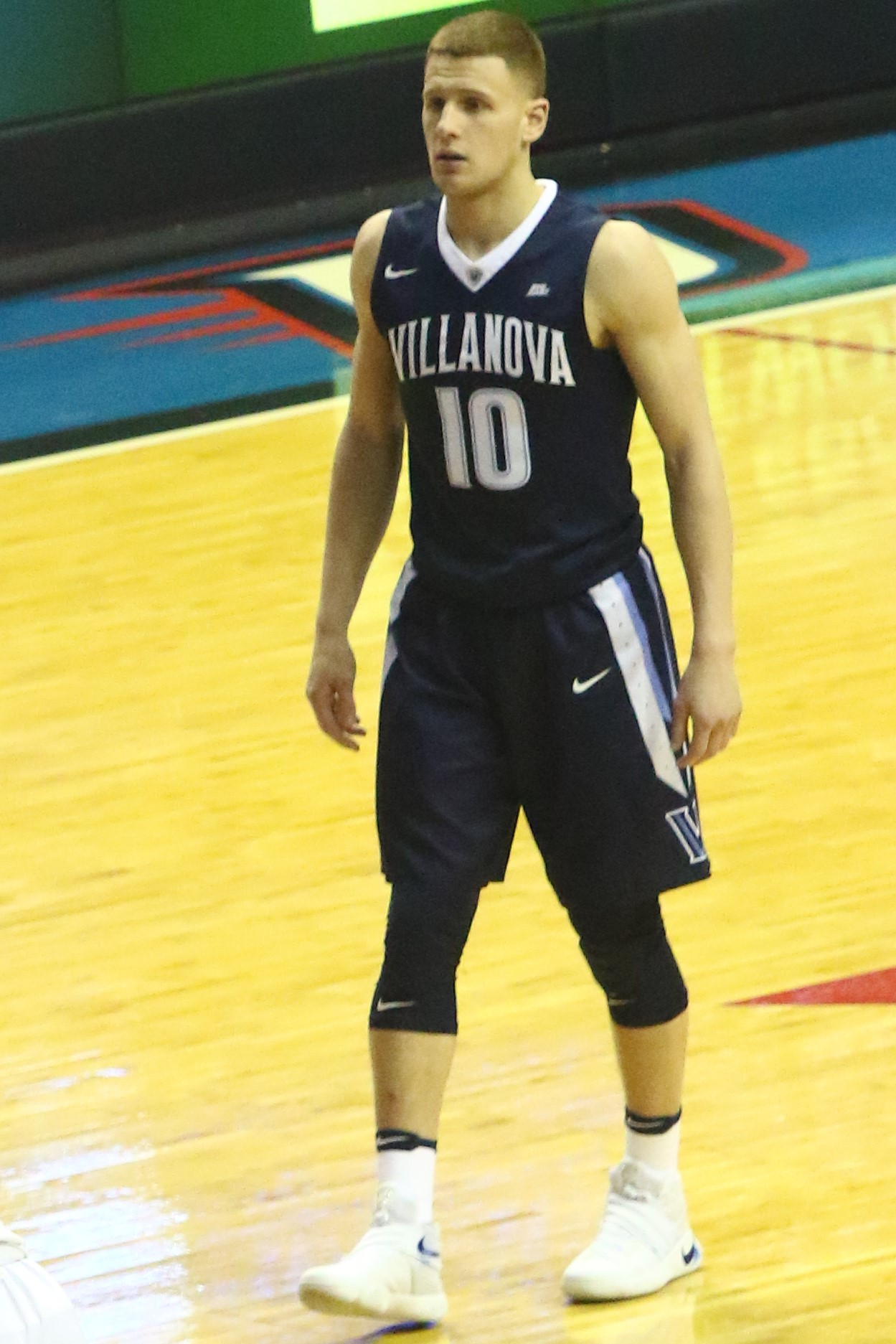
NBA player Donte DiVincenzo

=== Other ===
Name / Class year / Notability / References; Paul Anthony Ciancia / 2008 / terrorist shooter at Los Angeles International Airport in 2013

=== Notable Non-Graduates ===
Name	Class year	Notability	References
Tom Welling	1995 (attended as freshman, 1991–1992)	Actor. Best known for starring as Clark Kent/Superman in the television series Smallville (2001–2011).	
Charlie McDermott	2008 (attended for two years, left in 2006)	Actor. Best known for his long‑running television role as Axl Heck on The Middle (2009–2018).	
