= Charles J. Dunlap Jr. =

United States Air Force general

Major General Charles J. Dunlap Jr.
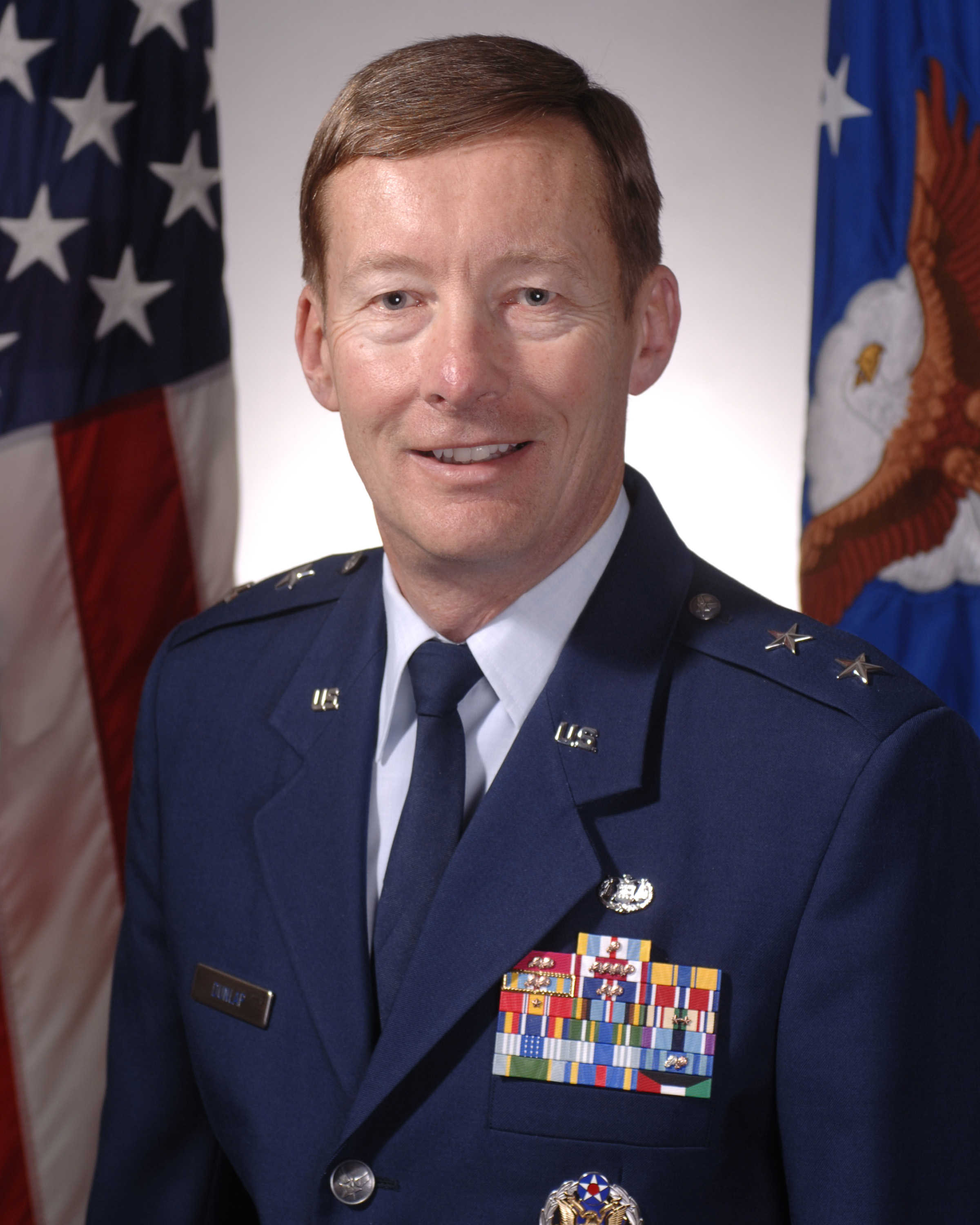
- Born: June 16, 1950 (age 76)
- Military career
- Allegiance: United States
- Branch: United States Air Force
- Service years: 1972–2010 (38 years)
- Rank: Major general
- Awards: See below

Major General Charles J. Dunlap Jr. (born June 16, 1950) is a retired military officer who served as the Deputy Judge Advocate General at the U.S. Air Force Headquarters in Washington, D.C. He retired from this position in February 2010.

As of 2018, Dunlap is executive director of Duke Law School's Centre on Law, Ethics and National Security.

== Military career ==
In his capacity as deputy judge advocate general, Dunlap assisted the Judge Advocate General in the professional oversight of more than 2,200 judge advocates, 350 civilian attorneys, 1,400 enlisted paralegals and 550 civilians assigned worldwide. In addition to overseeing an array of military justice, operational, international and civil law functions, Dunlap provided legal advice to the Air Staff and commanders at all levels.

Dunlap was commissioned through the AFROTC program at St. Joseph's University in May 1972, and was admitted to the Bar of the Supreme Court of the Commonwealth of Pennsylvania in 1975. He has deployed to support various operations in the Middle East and Africa, including Provide Relief, Restore Hope, Vigilant Warrior, Desert Fox, Bright Star, and Enduring Freedom. He has led military-to-military delegations to Uruguay, the Czech Republic, South Africa and Colombia.

Dunlap speaks widely on legal and national security issues, and he is published in Air and Space Power Journal, Peacekeeping & International Relations, Parameters, Proceedings, Military Review, The Fletcher Forum of World Affairs, Air Force Times, the Wake Forest Law Review, the Air Force Law Review, the Tennessee Law Review, the Strategic Review, and the War on the Rocks foreign policy and national security platform, among others. Prior to assuming his current position, General Dunlap served as the staff judge advocate at Headquarters Air Combat Command.

Dunlap is currently a professor at Duke University School of Law, where he teaches courses on national security law and the use of force in international law, among other topics.

Dunlap wrote an essay in 1992 called The Origins of the American Military Coup of 2012, presented as a work written by a jailed anti-coup military officer 20 years into the future, in which he asserted that the blurring of the military role of the armed forces into civilian missions might be dangerous to democracy and civilian government. Douglas V. Mastriano's 2001 master's thesis, which was written as a response to Dunlap's essay and which similarly presented itself as a work by a military officer of the future, argued to the contrary; Mastriano claimed that only the military could save the United States from "morally debauched" civilian leaders.

== Education ==
- 1968 High School diploma, Salesianum School, Wilmington, Delaware
- 1972 Bachelor of Arts degree, St. Joseph's University, Philadelphia, Pennsylvania
- 1975 Juris Doctor, Villanova University School of Law, Villanova, Pennsylvania
- 1979 Squadron Officer School, Maxwell AFB, Alabama
- 1984 Armed Forces Staff College, Norfolk, Virginia
- 1989 Air War College, by correspondence
- 1992 Distinguished graduate, National War College, Fort Lesley J. McNair, Washington, D.C.
- 1996 National Security Program, Maxwell School of Citizenship and Public Affairs, Syracuse University, New York

== Assignments ==
- January 1976 – April 1977, assistant staff judge advocate, 2nd Combat Group, Barksdale AFB, Louisiana
- April 1977 – May 1978, assistant staff judge advocate, 51st Combat Group, Osan Air Base, South Korea
- May 1978 – December 1978, chief, Civil Law Division, 20th Combat Group, Royal Air Force Upper Heyford, England
- December 1978 – March 1980, chief, Military Justice Division, 20th Tactical Fighter Wing, Royal Air Force Upper Heyford, England
- March 1980 – July 1983, faculty member, Air Force Judge Advocate General School, Maxwell Air Force Base, Alabama
- July 1983 – January 1984, chief, Military Justice Division, Air Force Judge Advocate General School, Maxwell Air Force Base, Alabama
- January 1984 – July 1984, student, Armed Forces Staff College, Norfolk, Virginia
- July 1984 – July 1987, staff judge advocate, 97th Bombardment Wing, Blytheville AFB, Arkansas
- July 1987 – June 1989, circuit military judge, Air Force Legal Services Agency, Bolling AFB, Washington, D.C.
- June 1989 – August 1991, chief, Personnel Action Law Branch, General Law Division, Headquarters U.S. Air Force, Washington, D.C.
- August 1991 – July 1992, student, National War College, Fort Lesley J. McNair, Washington, D.C.
- July 1992 – January 1995, deputy staff judge advocate, United States Central Command, MacDill Air Force Base, Florida
- January 1995 – July 1998, staff judge advocate, United States Strategic Command, Offutt Air Force Base, Nebraska
- July 1998 – July 2000, staff judge advocate, 9th Air Force, Shaw Air Force Base, South Carolina
- July 2000 – February 2002, staff judge advocate, Headquarters Air Education and Training Command, Randolph Air Force Base, Texas
- February 2002 – May 2006, staff judge advocate, Headquarters Air Combat Command, Langley Air Force Base, Virginia
- May 2006– February 2010, deputy judge advocate general, Headquarters U.S. Air Force, Washington, D.C.

== Awards and decorations ==
Judge Advocate Badge
Headquarters Air Force Badge

Personal decorations
	Defense Superior Service Medal with bronze oak leaf cluster
Width-44 crimson ribbon with a pair of width-2 white stripes on the edges	Legion of Merit with two bronze oak leaf clusters
Width-44 crimson ribbon with two width-8 white stripes at distance 4 from the edges.	Meritorious Service Medal with four bronze oak leaf clusters
	Air Force Commendation Medal
Unit awards
	Joint Meritorious Unit Award with two bronze oak leaf clusters
	Air Force Outstanding Unit Award with two bronze oak leaf clusters
	Air Force Organizational Excellence Award
Campaign and service medals
Width=44 scarlet ribbon with a central width-4 golden yellow stripe, flanked by pairs of width-1 scarlet, white, Old Glory blue, and white stripes	National Defense Service Medal with bronze service star
	Armed Forces Expeditionary Medal
	Southwest Asia Service Medal with two bronze service stars
	Global War on Terrorism Service Medal
	Korea Defense Service Medal
	Humanitarian Service Medal
Service, training, and marksmanship awards
	Air Force Overseas Short Tour Service Ribbon
	Air Force Overseas Long Tour Service Ribbon
	Air Force Longevity Service Award with silver and three bronze oak leaf clusters
	Small Arms Expert Marksmanship Ribbon
	Air Force Training Ribbon
Foreign awards
	Kuwait Liberation Medal (Kuwait)

=== Other achievements ===
- 1984 Outstanding Judge Advocate of the Year, Strategic Air Command
- 1992 U.S. Air Force Outstanding Career Armed Services Attorney
- 1996 Thomas P. Keenan Award for international and operations law

== Effective dates of promotion ==
Promotions
Insignia	Rank	Date
	Major general	May 3, 2006
	Brigadier general	September 1, 2002
	Colonel	August 1, 1993
	Lieutenant colonel	September 1, 1988
	Major	January 1, 1983
	Captain	January 20, 1976
	First lieutenant	June 9, 1975
	Second lieutenant	May 14, 1972

== See also ==
- Egalitarianism
