= Senator Conner =

Senator Conner may refer to:

- Alexander H. Conner (1831–1891), Nebraska State Senate
- Henry Conner (1837–after 1916), Wisconsin State Senate
- Pat Conner (fl. 1990s), Arizona State Senate

== See also ==
- Senator Connor (disambiguation)
