= Emily Thompson (politician) =

American politician

Member of the Delaware Senate from the 15th district
- Incumbent
- Assumed office November 4, 2026
- Preceded by: David G. Lawson

Personal details
- Party: Republican

Emily A. Thompson is an American politician. A member of the Republican Party, she has served in the Delaware Senate since 2026, representing the 15th district.
