= Bryan Townsend (American politician) =

American politician

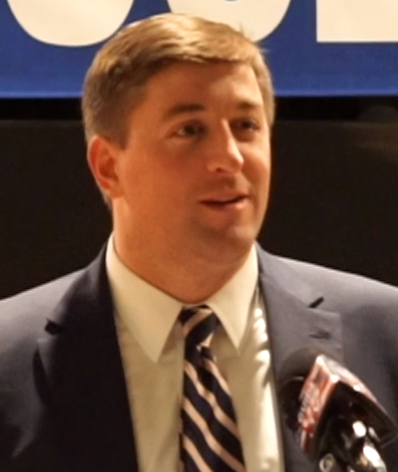

Majority Leader of the Delaware Senate
- Incumbent
- Assumed office November 4, 2020
- Preceded by: Nicole Poore

Member of the Delaware Senate from the 11th district
- Incumbent
- Assumed office January 8, 2013
- Preceded by: Anthony DeLuca

Personal details
- Born: May 19, 1981 (age 45) Wilmington, Delaware, U.S.
- Party: Democratic
- Education: University of Delaware (BA, BS); University of Cambridge (MPhil); Yale University (JD)

Bryan Jeffrey Schurgard Townsend (born May 19, 1981) is an American politician who represents District 11 in the Delaware Senate. Townsend was elected Senate Majority Leader in 2020. He serves as Chair of the Delaware Senate Labor Committee as well as Vice-Chair of the Senate Executive, Legislative Council, Judiciary, and Health and Social Services committees.

== Education ==
Townsend holds a Bachelor's and Master's degree in Economics from the University of Delaware. He also studied at the University of Cambridge, earning a Master of Philosophy in Chinese Studies. In 2009, he graduated from Yale Law School.

== Political career ==
As a political newcomer, Townsend defeated Anthony J. DeLuca—who was then President pro tempore of the Delaware Senate—in the 2012 Democratic primary by 57 percent to 42 percent. Townsend went on to defeat Republican Evan Queitsch in the general election, winning 78 percent of the vote.

Townsend was reelected in 2014. He defeated primary challenger David L. Tackett with 78 percent of the vote, and was unopposed in the general election.

In September 2015, in the wake of Representative John Carney's announcement that he would run for governor of the state, Townsend announced his candidacy for Delaware's at-large seat in the U.S. House of Representatives. On September 13, 2016, his candidacy ended when he placed second in a six-way Democratic primary, behind former state Secretary of Labor Lisa Blunt Rochester (25% to 44%).

== Legislation ==
Townsend supports banning assault weapons and argued in favor of a 2018 bill that was not released from committee. In 2023, Townsend introduced legislation establishing a right to representation for tenants in eviction proceedings. The bill was later signed into law. In 2024, he co-sponsored a bill legalizing medical aid in dying in Delaware.

== Electoral history ==
2012: Townsend defeated incumbent Anthony J. DeLuca in the Democratic Primary and won the November 6, 2012, General Election with 12,860 votes (78.4%) against Republican nominee Evan Queitsch.

2014: Townsend defeated David L. Tackett in a primary challenge with 1,253 votes (78.1%). He was unopposed in the General Election on November 4, 2014.

2016: Townsend was defeated by former Delaware Secretary of Labor Lisa Blunt Rochester in a six-way Democratic Primary for Delaware’s only seat in the U.S. House of Representatives. Townsend placed second in the September 13, 2016 Primary Election with 15,847 votes.

2018: Townsend won the November 6, 2018, General Election with 10,421 votes (75.75%) against Republican nominee Daniel Kapitanic.

2022: Townsend was unopposed in the November 8, 2022, General Election.

2024: Townsend was unopposed in the November 5, 2024, General Election.

Delaware Senate
Preceded by Nicole Poore	Majority Leader of the Delaware Senate; 2020–present	Incumbent
