= James J. Connell =

American naval aviator (1939–1971)

- Connell in 1961
- Born: James Joseph Connell; 6 May 1939; Wilmington, Delaware, US
- Died: 14 January 1971 (aged 31); Vietnam
- Burial place: Fort Rosecrans National Cemetery, San Diego
- Military career
- Allegiance: United States of America
- Branch: United States Navy
- Service years: 1962–1971
- Rank: Lieutenant commander
- Nickname: JJ
- Conflicts: Vietnam War
- Awards: Navy Cross; Legion of Merit; Distinguished Flying Cross; Purple Heart; Prisoner of War Medal

Lieutenant Commander James J. Connell (6 May 1939 – 14 January 1971) was an American naval aviator. Born in Wilmington, Delaware, Connell served in the United States Navy as a naval aviator. During the Vietnam War, Connell was shot down and captured, eventually dying in captivity. He was posthumously awarded the Navy Cross, with Connell's decoration being the highest award for valor bestowed on a Delawarean during the Vietnam War.

== Biography ==
James J. Connell was born on 6 May 1939 in Wilmington, Delaware. He attended Salesianum School in Wilmington, graduating as part of the Class of 1957 before enrolling in the Annapolis Naval Academy. Connell trained as a naval aviator at Annapolis, graduating in the Class of 1961 and receiving his designation as a naval aviator in June 1962. According to his Class' Lucky Bag, Connell was active in the Annapolis Foreign Relations Club and was interested in the field of criminal law.

Following his graduation from the naval academy, Connell was assigned to Naval Air Station Whiting Field as a flight instructor. After a year at Whiting Field, he was reassigned to a replacement air group at Naval Air Station Lemoore in Fresno, California. In August 1964 he was assigned to the navy's VA-55 attack squadron, with which unit Connell served aboard USS Ticonderoga and USS Ranger.

In the summer of 1966, Connell and his squadron (operating from USS Ranger) were participating in Operation Iron Hand, a series of strikes intended to suppress North Vietnamese SAM missile sites. On 15 July 1966, Connell (flying an A4E-Skyhawk (Note: Connell's aircraft was designated BuNo 151024.)) and a flight of three other aircraft were involved in a strike against several SAM sites near the Sông Hồng River (also known as the Sông Cái or Red River) south of Hanoi. During the attack, the flight encountered heavy anti-aircraft fire; pulling away from the first target, one pilot reported seeing a chute, indicating a Skyhawk had been shot down. Soon after, Connell re-established radio contact with his flight and confirmed that he had been shot down. He also reported that he had only received minor injuries during his ejection. Due to the remoteness of the area and the large concentrations of North Vietnamese forces nearby, rescue was deemed impossible and Connell was quickly captured by the North Vietnamese.

Following his capture, Connell was interned as one of dozens of American airmen prisoners of war (POWs) in North Vietnam; as the North Vietnamese government did not consider the captured Americans to qualify as proper POWs under the terms of the Geneva Convention, the captured airmen were often subjected to harsh conditions while in captivity. While imprisoned in North Vietnam, Connell was noted by multiple other POWs to have resisted his captors attempts to coerce (often via the use of torture) confessions out of him; Bud Day, another American POW, described Connell as a "hard resister", and several other prisoners noted that Connell's resistance often resulted in him being subjected to harsher-than-average treatment by the North Vietnamese. At one work camp near Hanoi—referred to as "The Zoo" by some prisoners—Connell was kept in almost continuous solitary confinement, only able to keep in communication with other prisoners via the use of a system of signals. On 14 January 1971, an incident occurred that resulted in Connell's death, though many fellow prisoners did not know of his fate until the end of the conflict.

Following the repatriation of American POWs in early 1973, Connell's death was confirmed. His remains were repatriated on 6 March 1974 (Note: Connell's remains were identified a month after repatriation on 3 April 1974.) and were interred at Fort Rosecrans National Cemetery in San Diego. Acting upon the testimony of his fellow POWs, Connell was posthumously promoted to Lieutenant-commander and awarded the Navy Cross for valor. According to one source, Connell's Navy Cross was the highest award for valor bestowed on a Delawarean during the Vietnam War.

=== Legacy ===
Despite his status as a highly decorated casualty of war, multiple sources have commented on Connell's relative obscurity in his home state of Delaware. In 2018, efforts by one Bill Coll (a retired Navy commander who had graduated from Salesianum several years after Connell) to have Connell recognized by Salesianum resulted in renewed interest in Connell's story. As a result of Coll's efforts, Connell was added to Salesianum's hall of fame as a distinguished alumnus.

In a ceremony on Veterans Day 2018, Delaware governor John Carney posthumously awarded Connell the Order of the First State, Delaware's highest honor. In attendance at the ceremony were US senators Chris Coons, Tom Carper, and retired Air Force Colonel Murphy Neal Jones, whom had himself been held as a POW in Vietnam and had heard of Connell's story. The award was presented to Connell's widow, Jenny Connell Robertson, and other members of his family.

Lt. Commander Connell's name is represented (Note: Panel 9E, Line 22.) on the Vietnam Veterans Memorial in Washington, DC, and on the Delaware Vietnam War Memorial in Wilmington, Delaware. He is also commemorated on the USNA Virtual Memorial Hall, a project documenting the lives of various graduates of Annapolis Naval Academy.

=== Personal life ===
Prior to his service in Vietnam, Connell married his wife, Jenny Connell. The couple had two children before James' loss. Following the death of her husband, Jenny actively participated in panels and discussions with POW family members.

== Awards ==
=== Military ===
Connell received the following medals:

- Navy Cross
- Legion of Merit
- Distinguished Flying Cross
- Purple Heart
- Prisoner of War medal

=== Civic ===
- Order of the First State - the State of Delaware's highest award, presented posthumously to Connell in 2018.
