= John F. Brady (politician) =

American politician (1959–2025)

Sussex County Clerk of Peace
- In office 2013–2017
- Preceded by: George Parish
- Succeeded by: Norman Jones Jr

Sussex County Recorder of Deeds
- In office 2003–2011
- Preceded by: Richard Bell II
- Succeeded by: Scott Dailey

Sussex County Register in Chancery
- In office 2001–2003
- Preceded by: David L. Wilson
- Succeeded by: Office abolished

Personal details
- Born: June 13, 1959 Darby, Pennsylvania, U.S.
- Died: August 10, 2025 (aged 66) Lewes, Delaware, U.S.
- Party: Democratic
- Education: University of Richmond, B.A. 1982
- Occupation: Lawyer, Public Official
- Profession: Attorney

John F. Brady (June 13, 1959 – August 10, 2025) was an American politician in the state of Delaware, attorney and political reporter.

== Life and career ==
Brady was born on June 13, 1959. He grew up in Wilmington and attended Salesianum School. He went on to the University of Delaware, and graduated from the University of Richmond for undergraduate and then to Widener Law School. He was admitted to the bar in Delaware and New Jersey and the Bar of the Supreme Court of the United States and served as the town Prosecutor in Dewey Beach, Delaware and Town Solicitor for Ellendale, Delaware.

Brady served as a Deputy Attorney General for the state of Delaware, as a legislative attorney, taught courses at Widener Law School, held offices in county government, practiced privately as an attorney and volunteered for charitable causes.

In 2008, Brady ran for state insurance commissioner as a Republican, losing to Democrat Karen Weldin Stewart.

In February 2009, Brady switched his affiliation and joined the Democratic Party. In 2011 when he left office as Recorder of Deeds, Brady was appointed by Governor Jack Markell to serve on the Delaware State Board of Plumbing, Heating, Ventilating and Air Conditioning for a three-year term as a public member.

Brady frequently appeared on WGMD-FM, Rehoboth Beach, a local talk station, as an on-air attorney fielding law questions from callers. Brady also appeared on WBOC 16 Fox 21, and WMDT 47 commenting on legal issues and cases in Delaware, as well as on Delaware 105.9 FM. Brady also reported on legal and political issues for WRDE TV NBC 31.1 Rehoboth Beach Delaware until his retirement in December of 2018.

In March 2012, he filed for the office of Sussex County Clerk of The Peace in the November 2012 general election. On November 6, 2012, Brady was elected clerk of the Peace for Sussex County, Delaware. The Clerk of the Peace is the head of the Marriage Bureau for the county, where marriage licenses are issued and upon request, the ceremony is performed. Brady was sworn into office in January, 2013. As of his retirement Brady performed almost 1000 wedding during his term.

On June 13, 2012 the Delaware State Senate confirmed him for a six-year term on the Delaware State Industrial Accident Board where he served until March 14, 2018.

In 2019, the Del-Mar-Va Council presented Brady with the Silver Beaver Award for outstanding service to the local Council and Brady also received the Outstanding Eagle Scout Award from the National Eagle Scout Association. He served as the District Chairman for the Sussex District of Del-Mar-Va Council and the Vice Commodore for Finance for the Northeast Region of the Boy Scouts of America.

In May 2018 he was appointed law librarian for Sussex County Law Library operated by the Administrative Office of the Courts. Known as the Judges library, there is a location in each county of the state.

He retired as the Political Reporter and Legal Analyst for WRDE-LD, the NBC station in Delaware on December 31, 2018.

He practiced law with his brother at The Brady Law Firm.

Brady died after a long illness at his home in Lewes, Delaware, on August 10, 2025, at the age of 66.

== Public offices ==
Public offices
Office	Type	Location	Elected	In office
Register in Chancery	Executive	Georgetown	2000	2001–2003
Recorder of Deeds	Executive	Georgetown	2002	2003–2011
Clerk of the Peace	Executive	Georgetown	2012	2013–2017

== Sources ==
- http://www.delawareonline.com/apps/pbcs.dll/article?AID=2012311070044&nclick_check=1
- https://web.archive.org/web/20151229091811/http://archive.delawareonline.com/article/20130915/LIFE06/309150008/Anything-Once-She-ties-knot-couple
- http://wgmd.com/de-democrats-jamboree-with-the-vp-at-cape-henlopen
- http://wgmd.com/de-supreme-court-reverses-conviction-of-rondaiges-harper
- http://capegazette.villagesoup.com/p/what-you-dont-know-about-john-brady/926225
