= Cesidio Colasante =

American soccer player

Personal information
- Date of birth: January 10, 1975 (age 51)
- Place of birth: Wilmington, Delaware, U.S.
- Height: 5 ft 9 in (1.75 m)
- Position: Midfielder

College career
Years	Team	Apps	(Gls)
1994–1997	La Salle Explorers	77	(76)

Senior career*
Years	Team	Apps	(Gls)
1998–1999	Philadelphia KiXX (indoor)	26	(3)
1999–2000	Hershey Wildcats	25	(1)
2000–2003	Philadelphia KiXX (indoor)	73	(42)
- * Club domestic league appearances and goals

Cesidio Colasante is an American retired soccer midfielder who played professionally in the National Professional Soccer League and USL A-League.

== Career ==
=== Youth and college ===
Colasante graduated from Salesianum School in Wilmington, Delaware, where he was an All State soccer player. After high school, Colasante attended La Salle University in Philadelphia, Pennsylvania, where he was a 1997 Third Team All American. He is a member of the La Salle Athletic Hall of Fame.

=== Professional ===
On February 1, 1998, the MetroStars selected Colasante in the third round (twenty-eighth overall) in the 1998 MLS College Draft. The team released him during the pre-season. In the last summer of 1998, he signed with the Philadelphia KiXX of the National Professional Soccer League who had drafted him in the January 2, 1998, NPSL draft. In 1999, he moved to the Hershey Wildcats of the USL A-League. In June 2000, he returned to the KiXX. In July 2003, the KiXX traded Mark Moser, Kevin Hundelt, Droo Callahan and Matt DeJong to the St. Louis Steamers in exchange for Colasante and Ze Santana.
