= Nancy W. Cook =

American politician (1936–2026)

Nancy Cook

Member of the Delaware Senate from the 15th district
- In office 1974 – November 10, 2010
- Preceded by: Allen J. Cook
- Succeeded by: David G. Lawson

Personal details
- Born: May 11, 1936 Philadelphia, Pennsylvania, U.S.
- Died: March 23, 2026 (aged 89)
- Party: Democratic
- Spouse: Allen J. Cook (died 1974)

Nancy Wilson Cook (May 11, 1936 – March 23, 2026) was an American politician who served in the Delaware Senate for the 15th district from 1974 to 2010, as a member of the Democratic Party. She was elected to the seat in a special election after her husband, Allen Cook, died while in office.

Cook was born on May 11, 1936 in Philadelphia, and attended William Penn High School and the University of Delaware. She was a resident in Kenton, Delaware and a member of the Kent County, Delaware Democratic Committee. In 2010, Cook ran for reelection and lost to David G. Lawson, flipping the seat from Democratic to Republican. In 2011, Cook was appointed by Governor Jack Markell to the open Kent County Register of Wills position until the following election in 2012.

Cook died on March 23, 2026, at the age of 89.
