= Leon Dombrowski =

American football player (1938–1998)

No. 61
- Position: Linebacker

Personal information
- Born: April 9, 1938; Wilmington, Delaware, U.S.
- Died: September 5, 1998 (aged 60); Madison County, Montana, U.S.
- Listed height: 6 ft 0 in (1.83 m)
- Listed weight: 215 lb (98 kg)

Career information
- High school: Salesianum School (Wilmington, Delaware)
- College: Delaware
- AFL draft: 1960: N/Ath round, N/A (By the Minneapolis AFL team)th overall pick

Career history
- New York Titans (1960)

Career statistics
- Games played: 1
- Stats at Pro Football Reference

Leon Raymond Dombrowski (April 9, 1938 – September 5, 1998) was an American football linebacker who played for one season in the American Football League (AFL). He played in one game for the New York Titans in 1960 after playing college football for the Delaware Fightin' Blue Hens. He was named to the All-East weekly college football team for his performance on October 24, 1959.
