= Senator Connors =

Senator Connors may refer to:

- Albert J. Connors (1891–1948), Wisconsin State Senate
- Christopher J. Connors (born 1956), New Jersey State Senate
- Leonard T. Connors (1929–2016), New Jersey State Senate
- William J. Connors (1891–1961), Illinois State Senate

== See also ==
- Senator Connor (disambiguation)
