= Philip D. Cloutier =

American politician (1949–1998)

Philip Cloutier

Member of the Delaware House of Representatives from the 11th district
- In office January 3, 1995 – September 4, 1998
- Preceded by: Peggy Bradley
- Succeeded by: Catherine Cloutier

Member of the New Castle County Council
- In office 1988–1994

Personal details
- Born: October 1, 1949 Ware, Massachusetts, Massachusetts, U.S.
- Died: September 4, 1998 (aged 48) Wilmington, Delaware, Delaware, U.S.
- Party: Republican
- Spouse: Catherine Labonte
- Children: 4
- Education: University of Pennsylvania (BS, MS); Widener University (JD)

Philip D. Cloutier (October 1, 1949 – September 4, 1998) was an American politician, engineer, and attorney who served as a member of the Delaware House of Representatives and New Castle County Council.

== Early life and education ==
Cloutier was born in Ware, Massachusetts. He received his bachelor's and master's degrees in mechanical engineering from University of Pennsylvania in 1972 and 1974. He received his Juris Doctor from the Widener University Delaware Law School in 1982.

== Career ==
After graduating from law school, Cloutier was admitted to the Delaware State Bar Association. He also served as a purchasing agent for the Du Pont Company. He served on the New Castle County Council from 1988 to 1994 and later served as the council's president. Cloutier was a Republican. He served in the Delaware House of Representatives from 1994 until his death.

Upon his death, Cloutier's wife, Catherine Cloutier, was selected to succeed him in the House. She was later elected to the Delaware Senate.

== Personal life ==
Cloutier lived in Wilmington, Delaware with his wife and family. He died of cancer in 1998.

Delaware House of Representatives
Preceded by Peggy Bradley	Member of the Delaware House of Representatives from the 11th district 1995–1998	Succeeded by Catherine Cloutier
