= Delaware's 11th Senate district =

American legislative district

Delaware's 11th State Senate district
Senator
Bryan Townsend; D–Westover Woods
- Registration: 56.6% Democratic; 18.3% Republican; 25.1% No party preference
- Demographics: 47% White; 28% Black; 16% Hispanic; 7% Asian; 3% Other
- Population (2018): 42,799
- Registered voters: 30,487

Delaware's 11th Senate district is one of 21 districts in the Delaware Senate. It has been represented by Democrat Bryan Townsend since 2012, following his defeat of incumbent Anthony DeLuca in the Democratic primary.

== Geography ==
District 11 covers communities immediately to the east of Newark in New Castle County, including Brookside, Christiana, Woodshade, Taylortown, and some of Bear.

Like all districts in the state, the 11th Senate district is located entirely within Delaware's at-large congressional district. It overlaps with the 5th, 18th, 24th, and 26th districts of the Delaware House of Representatives.

== Recent election results ==
Delaware Senators are elected to staggered four-year terms. Under normal circumstances, the 11th district holds elections in midterm years, except immediately after redistricting, when all seats are up for election regardless of the usual cycle.

=== 2024 ===
Delaware Senate 11th district general election, 2024
Party	Candidate	Votes	%
Democratic	Bryan Townsend (incumbent)	15,898	100%
Total votes		15,898	100%
Democratic hold			

=== 2022 ===
2022 Delaware Senate election, District 11
Party	Candidate	Votes	%
Democratic	Bryan Townsend (incumbent)	8,843	100.0
Total votes		8,843	100

=== 2018 ===
2018 Delaware Senate election, District 11
Party	Candidate	Votes	%
Democratic	Bryan Townsend (incumbent)	10,421	75.8
Republican	Dan Kapitanic	3,335	24.2
Total votes		13,756	100
Democratic hold			

=== 2014 ===
2014 Delaware Senate election, District 11
Primary election
Party	Candidate	Votes	%
Democratic	Bryan Townsend (incumbent)	1,253	78.1
Democratic	David Tackett	352	21.9
Total votes		1,605	100
General election
Democratic	Bryan Townsend (incumbent)	6,426	100
Total votes		6,426	100
Democratic hold			

=== 2012 ===
2012 Delaware Senate election, District 11
Primary election
Party	Candidate	Votes	%
Democratic	Bryan Townsend	1,441	57.8
Democratic	Anthony DeLuca (incumbent)	1,054	42.2
Total votes		2,495	100
General election
Democratic	Bryan Townsend	12,860	78.4
Republican	Evan Queitsch	3,550	21.6
Total votes		16,410	100
Democratic hold			

=== Federal and statewide results ===
Year	Office	Results
2020	President	Biden 71.3 – 27.0%
2016	President	Clinton 66.5 – 28.1%
2014	Senate	Coons 68.5 – 29.2%
2012	President	Obama 72.9 – 25.7%
2012	Senate	Carper 77.0 – 19.6%
2012	Governor	Markell 79.1 – 18.8%
