= James T. Vaughn =

American politician (1925–2007)

James Townsend Vaughn (April 12, 1925 – October 10, 2007) was an American politician and law enforcement officer.

Vaughn was born on the Vaughn family farm near Cheswold, Kent County, Delaware. He graduated from the John Bassett More High School in Smyrna, Delaware in 1943. Vaughn served in the United States Marine Corps during World War II and was commissioned a corporal. Vaughn lived in Smyrna, Delaware with his wife and family. He also served with the Delaware State Police from 1946 to 1966. He then served as the Delaware Commissioner of Correction from 1976 to 1979. Vaughn served on the Smyrna School Board from 1965 to 1980 and was the president of the school board. He served in the Delaware Senate from 1980 until his retirement in 2007. Vaughn died at the Bayhealth-Kent Hospital in Dover, Delaware and was buried in Smyrna, Delaware.
