= Nicole Poore =

American politician

Majority Leader of the Delaware Senate
- In office January 8, 2019 – November 4, 2020
- Preceded by: Margaret Rose Henry
- Succeeded by: Bryan Townsend

Member of the Delaware Senate from the 12th district
- Incumbent
- Assumed office January 8, 2013
- Preceded by: Dorinda Connor

Personal details
- Party: Democratic
- Education: Wilmington University
- Website: Official website

Nicole Poore is an American politician and a Democratic member of the Delaware Senate representing District 12. Poore was elected Senate Majority Leader in 2019 after previously serving as Senate Majority Whip.

Poore has degrees in criminal justice from Delaware Technical Community College and Wilmington University. She has a master’s degree in organizational leadership.

Poore is chair of the Joint Capital Improvement Committee and vice chair of the Senate Health & Social Services Committee and Senate Labor Committee. She serves on the Human Trafficking Interagency Coordinating Council, the Domestic Violence Coordinating Council, the Utilities Coordination Council, and the Riverfront Development Corporation.

Poore is Catholic.

== Legislation ==
In 2022, Poore introduced a series of bills to prevent sexual abuse and misconduct in public schools. She also sponsored legislation to update Delaware's sexual extortion law.

Poore is active in the disabled community, and has supported numerous resolutions promoting awareness of physical and cognitive disabilities.

== Electoral history ==
- In 2012, Poore challenged incumbent Republican Dorinda Connor and won the three-way general election with 12,875 votes (60.3%) against Connor and Libertarian candidate Brad Thomas.
- In 2016, Poore was unopposed in the general election, winning 18,961 votes.
- In 2020, Poore was unopposed in the General Election, winning 21,606 votes.
- In 2022, Poore defeated Republican nominee Bill Alexander in the General Election, winning 10,226 votes (62.15%).

Delaware Senate
Preceded by Margaret Rose Henry	Majority Leader of the Delaware Senate; 2019–2020	Succeeded by Bryan Townsend
