= Marie Pinkney =

American politician from Delaware

Member of the Delaware Senate from the 13th district
- Incumbent
- Assumed office November 5, 2020
- Preceded by: David McBride

Personal details
- Party: Democratic

Marie Pinkney is a social worker and member of the Delaware Senate from New Castle County, Delaware. A newcomer to politics, in September 2020 she defeated incumbent State Senate President Pro Tempore David McBride in the Democratic primary election by a 52.4%-47.6% margin. In the heavily-Democratic majority minority 13th District, the Democratic nomination is considered tantamount to election.

Pinkney defeated Republican nominee Alexander Homich in the general election of November 3, 2020. Pinkney is the first openly queer woman elected to serve in Delaware's state legislature, after Senator Karen E. Peterson came out as gay in 2013 while in office. She is one of three LGBTQ+ candidates to be elected to the Delaware General Assembly in 2020, along with Sarah McBride and Eric Morrison.

== Personal life ==
Pinkney grew up in New Castle and Wilmington. She attended Howard High School of Technology and Delaware State University. She worked at a treatment center for adolescents with mental health and substance abuse problems, and now works as a trauma social worker and case manager at Christiana Hospital. Pinkney identifies as queer and is an active member of Christiana Care PRIDE, the LGBTQ+ employee resource group at her workplace.

== Legislation ==
Pinkney supports expansion of healthcare availability and has sponsored legislation to cap prices of certain medical equipment. In 2021, she introduced legislation to allow pharmacists to dispense contraception without a prescription.

Pinkney sponsored SB 144, which updated and expanded Delaware's hate crime statute.

== Electoral history ==
2020: Pinkney defeated incumbent David McBride with 3,111 votes (52.37%) in the Democratic Primary held on September 15, 2020. She would go on to defeat Republican nominee Alexander M. Homich with 14,044 votes (75.84%) in the General Election.

2022: Pinkney was unopposed in the General Election held on November 8, 2022.
