= Spiros Mantzavinos =

American politician from Delaware

Member of the Delaware Senate from the 7th district
- Incumbent
- Assumed office January 12, 2021
- Preceded by: Anthony Delcollo

Personal details
- Party: Democratic
- Education: Muhlenberg College; University of Delaware
- Profession: Professor

Spiros Mantzavinos is an American politician. He is a Democratic member of the Delaware Senate representing District 7.

== Career ==
In the 1990s, Mantzavinos worked as a legislative assistant and research analyst with the Delaware Senate. He went on to be Vice President of the New Castle County Chamber of Commerce. He founded and owns The Mantzavinos Group, a strategic communications consulting firm.

Mantzavinos was first elected to the Delaware Senate in 2020. He is known for his work in health and insurance policy and currently serves as Chair of the Senate Banking, Business, Insurance & Technology Committee.

== Education ==
Mantzavinos earned bachelor’s degrees in economics and political science from Muhlenberg College, as well as a master’s degree in political science from the University of Delaware. He has taught as an adjunct professor at Wilmington University.

== Legislation ==
Mantzavinos is known for his work in long-term care and insurance policy. In 2025, he introduced legislation to update the long-term care resident’s bill of rights to protect against discrimination on the basis of belonging to a protected class.

== Electoral history ==
2020: Mantzavinos defeated Republican nominee Anthony Delcollo in the General Election held on November 3, 2020, with 10,399 votes (51.35%).

2022: Mantzavinos won reelection against Republican nominee M. Sherm Porter in the General Election held on November 8, 2022, with 7,663 votes (58.69%).
