= Joseph G. Di Pinto =

American politician (1932–2024)

Member of the Delaware House of Representatives from the 4th district
- In office 1987–2006
- Preceded by: Kevin Free
- Succeeded by: Gerald Brady

Personal details
- Born: March 31, 1932 Claymont, Delaware, U.S.
- Died: May 13, 2024 (aged 92)
- Party: Republican
- Education: University of Notre Dame

Joseph G. Di Pinto (March 31, 1932 – May 13, 2024) was an American politician. He served as a Republican member for the 4th district of the Delaware House of Representatives.

== Life and career ==
Di Pinto was born in Claymont, Delaware. He attended the University of Notre Dame. He served in the Delaware House of Representatives from 1987 to 2006. Di Pinto died on May 13, 2024, at the age of 92.
