= Patricia Blevins =

American politician (1954–2026)

President pro tempore of the Delaware Senate
- In office 2013–2017
- Preceded by: Anthony DeLuca
- Succeeded by: David McBride

Member of the Delaware Senate from the 7th district
- In office 1990–2017
- Preceded by: Robert T. Still
- Succeeded by: Anthony Delcollo

Personal details
- Born: Patricia Mary Walker; February 21, 1954 Wilmington, Delaware, U.S.
- Died: October 7, 2026 (aged 72) Elsmere, Delaware, U.S.
- Party: Democratic
- Education: Temple University

Patricia Mary Blevins (née Walker; February 21, 1954 – October 7, 2026) was an American politician and President pro tempore of the Delaware Senate. A Democrat, she represented the 7th district from 1990 until 2016, when she lost her reelection campaign by 282 votes. Blevins served as Majority Leader of the Delaware Senate from 2009 to 2012 and Majority Whip from 2007 to 2009. She was on the town council and mayor of Elsmere, Delaware, from 1985 to 1990. She attended Mount Pleasant High School and received her BA in psychology from Temple University in 1975.

Blevins died on October 7, 2026, at the age of 72.

Delaware Senate
Preceded by Anthony J. DeLuca	President pro tempore 2013–2017	Succeeded by David McBride
