= Charles P. West =

American politician

Charles P. West (May 2, 1921 – October 7, 2015) was an American politician. Born on the family farm in Gumboro Hundred, Delaware, he served in the United States Army during World War II. West was a farmer and carpenter, and a member of the United Brotherhood of Carpenters and Joiners. From 1957 to 1959 and then from 1977 to 2003, he served in the Delaware House of Representatives as a Democrat. In 1954, West held the position of Vice President of the Delaware chapter of the National Association for the Advancement of White People (NAAWP). West died at his home in Gumboro, Delaware.
