= Anthony Delcollo =

American politician (born 1985)

Member of the Delaware Senate from the 7th district
- In office November 9, 2016 – January 12, 2021
- Preceded by: Patricia Blevins
- Succeeded by: Spiros Mantzavinos

Personal details
- Born: 1985 (age 40–41) Marshallton, Delaware, U.S.
- Party: Republican
- Education: La Salle University (BA); Seton Hall (JD)

Anthony Delcollo (born 1985) is an American politician. He is a former Republican member of the Delaware Senate representing District 7.

== Early life and education ==
Delcollo was born in Marshallton Heights in 1985 to Daniel and Barbara Delcollo. He attended high school at Salesianum School and is an Eagle Scout. Delcollo then attended La Salle University and then earned his Juris Doctor from Seton Hall University School of Law.

== Political career ==
Delcollo was elected to the Delaware Senate in 2016 after defeating incumbent Democrat Patricia Blevins by 282 votes (50.55% to 49.45%). Delcollo joined State Representative Kim Williams to sponsor and help pass House Bill No. 337, which made Delaware the first state to fully ban child marriage for any person under 18 years old. While the bill unanimously passed the Delaware Senate, Republicans in the Delaware House of Representatives opposed the bill, stating that it was overly broad.
