= Bob Connor (politician) =

American politician

Member of the Delaware Senate from the 12th district
- In office 1980–1997
- Succeeded by: Dorinda Connor

Personal details
- Born: January 2, 1938
- Died: March 7, 1997 (aged 59) Delaware, US
- Party: Republican
- Spouse: Dorinda Connor

Robert Thomas Connor (January 2, 1938 – March 7, 1997) was an American politician. Connor died in office and was succeeded by his wife Dorinda Connor who won the special election.
