= David G. Lawson =

American politician (born 1946)

David Lawson

Member of the Delaware Senate from the 15th district
- Incumbent
- Assumed office November 10, 2010
- Preceded by: Nancy W. Cook
- Succeeded by: Emily Thompson

Personal details
- Born: October 29, 1946 (age 80) Johnstown, Pennsylvania, U.S.
- Party: Republican
- Education: Delaware Technical Community College, Glendale Community College (California), Delaware State Police Academy
- Website: www.senatordavelawson.com

David G. Lawson (born October 29, 1946) is an American politician and a Republican member of the Delaware Senate, where he has represented the 15th District since 2011.

== Biography ==
Lawson was born on October 29, 1946, in Johnstown, Pennsylvania, and raised on a farm in the Allegheny Mountains.

Lawson enlisted in the United States Air Force and completed a tour of duty in Vietnam before being honorably discharged in 1969. After his retirement from the Air Force, Lawson settled in Harrington, Delaware, where he served as a volunteer with the Harrington Fire Company. He began a career in law enforcement with the Milford Police Department where he worked as a policeman until transferring to the Delaware State Police in 1973. He retired in 1992 and served as a Delaware State Police Range Instructor and as the Lieutenant of the Special Operations Response Team. Lawson attended Glendale Community College, Delaware Technical Community College, and the Delaware State Police Academy.

Lawson was rebuked by Senate President pro tempore David McBride in April 2017 after Lawson called it "despicable" to allow two Muslims to read from the Quran for the daily invocation. Muslim leaders and others in Delaware condemned Lawson's comments and described them as Islamophobic.

== Elections ==
- In 2016, Lawson was unopposed for the Republican primary and won the general election unopposed with 15,036 votes.
- In 2012, Lawson was unopposed for the Republican primary and won the three-way general election with 9,547 votes (50.6%) against Democratic nominee Kathleen Cooke and Independent candidate Catherine Samardza.
- In 2010, Lawson was unopposed for the Republican primary and challenged incumbent Democratic Senator Nancy W. Cook in the general election, winning with 8,370 votes (52.3%).
