= Donna Stone (politician) =

American politician (1944-2023)

Member of the Delaware House of Representatives from the 32nd district
- In office 1995–2008
- Preceded by: Edward Bennett
- Succeeded by: Brad Bennett

Personal details
- Born: October 12, 1944 Dover, Delaware, U.S.
- Died: March 5, 2023 (aged 78) Lewes, Delaware, U.S
- Party: Republican
- Spouse: Thomas H. Stone
- Children: 2
- Education: Northwestern University (BA)

Donna Stone (1944–2023) was an American politician who served in the Delaware House of Representatives from 1995 to 2008. During her term, she was active in the National Conference of State Legislatures (NCSL), including chairing the Financial Services Committee and becoming its president from 2007-2008. In 2008, Stone lost reelection to Brad Bennett, whose father previously held the seat.

On March 5, 2023, Stone died in her home in Lewes, Delaware, after a battle with cancer.
