= Delaware's 12th Senate district =

American legislative district

Delaware's 12th State Senate district
Senator
Nicole Poore; D–Wrangle Hill
- Registration: 54.8% Democratic; 21.0% Republican; 24.2% No party preference
- Demographics: 57% White; 28% Black; 7% Hispanic; 5% Asian; 2% Other
- Population (2018): 48,586
- Registered voters: 39,078

Delaware's 12th Senate district is one of 21 districts in the Delaware Senate. It has been represented by Democrat Nicole Poore, the Senate Majority Leader, since 2012.

== Senators ==
- Bob Connor (Republican) (1980–1997)
- Dorinda Connor (Republican) (1997–2012)
- Nicole Poore (Democrat) (2012 to present)

== Geography ==
District 12 covers much of central New Castle County along the Delaware River, including Delaware City, Wrangle Hill, Williamsburg, Kirkwood, Greylag, Bayview Manor, Monterey Farms, and parts of Glasgow, Bear, New Castle, and Wilmington Manor.

Like all districts in the state, the 12th Senate district is located entirely within Delaware's at-large congressional district. It overlaps with the 9th, 15th, 16th, 17th, and 27th districts of the Delaware House of Representatives.

== Recent election results ==
Delaware Senators are elected to staggered four-year terms. Under normal circumstances, the 12th district holds elections in presidential years, except immediately after redistricting, when all seats are up for election regardless of usual cycle.

=== 2020 ===
2020 Delaware Senate election, District 12
Party	Candidate	Votes	%
Democratic	Nicole Poore (incumbent)	21,606	100
Total votes		21,606	100
Democratic hold			

=== 2016 ===
2016 Delaware Senate election, District 12
Primary election
Party	Candidate	Votes	%
Democratic	Nicole Poore (incumbent)	18,961	100
Total votes		18,961	100
Democratic hold			

=== 2012 ===
2012 Delaware Senate election, District 12
Party	Candidate	Votes	%
Democratic	Nicole Poore	12,875	60.3
Republican	Dorinda Connor (incumbent)	8,170	38.3
Libertarian	Brad Thomas	310	1.5
Total votes		21,355	100
Democratic gain from Republican			

=== Federal and statewide results ===
Year	Office	Results
2020	President	Biden 67.2 – 31.3%
2016	President	Clinton 62.3 – 33.4%
2014	Senate	Coons 65.6 – 32.7%
2012	President	Obama 68.0 – 30.6%
2012	Senate	Carper 74.5 – 22.2%
2012	Governor	Markell 76.9 – 21.2%
