= Anthony J. DeLuca =

American politician

Member of the Delaware Senate from the 11th district
- In office 1998-2012
- Succeeded by: Bryan Townsend

Personal details
- Party: Democratic
- Profession: Electrician; Business manager

Anthony J. "Tony" DeLuca is an American politician and former President pro tempore of the Delaware Senate. A Democrat, DeLuca lost the Democratic primary to Bryan Townsend in 2012.
