= Delaware's 13th Senate district =

American legislative district

Delaware's 13th State Senate district
Senator
Marie Pinkney; D–New Castle County
- Registration: 61.5% Democratic; 16.3% Republican; 22.2% No party preference
- Demographics: 38% White; 38% Black; 15% Hispanic; 7% Asian; 3% Other
- Population (2018): 43,885
- Registered voters: 30,022

Delaware's 13th Senate district is one of 21 districts in the Delaware Senate. It has been represented by Democrat Marie Pinkney since 2020, following her defeat of Senate President Pro Tempore David McBride in the Democratic primary.

== Geography ==
District 13 covers much of unincorporated New Castle County to the south of Wilmington, including Red Lion, Monterey Farms, Fairwinds, Duross Heights, Clearvier Manor, and parts of Bear and Wilmington Manor.

Like all districts in the state, the 13th Senate district is located entirely within Delaware's at-large congressional district. It overlaps with the 5th, 15th, 16th, 17th, and 18th districts of the Delaware House of Representatives.

== Recent election results ==
Delaware Senators are elected to staggered four-year terms. Under normal circumstances, the 13th district holds elections in presidential years, except immediately after redistricting, when all seats are up for election regardless of usual cycle.

=== 2020 ===
2020 Delaware Senate election, District 13
Party	Candidate	Votes	%
Democratic	Marie Pinkney	3,111	52.4
Democratic	David McBride (incumbent)	2,829	47.6
Total votes		5,940	100
General election
Democratic	Marie Pinkney	14,044	75.8
Republican	Alexander Homich	4,475	24.2
Total votes		18,519	100
Democratic hold			

=== 2016 ===
2016 Delaware Senate election, District 13
Party	Candidate	Votes	%
Democratic	David McBride (incumbent)	14,503	100
Total votes		14,503	100
Democratic hold			

=== 2012 ===
2012 Delaware Senate election, District 13
Party	Candidate	Votes	%
Democratic	David McBride (incumbent)	14,444	100
Total votes		14,444	100
Democratic hold			

=== Federal and statewide results ===
Year	Office	Results
2020	President	Biden 74.7 – 24.1%
2016	President	Clinton 70.6 – 25.2%
2014	Senate	Coons 73.6 – 24.8%
2012	President	Obama 77.3 – 21.5%
2012	Senate	Carper 81.1 – 16.1%
2012	Governor	Markell 82.6 – 15.7%
