= Dorinda Connor =

American politician

Member of the Delaware Senate from the 12th district
- In office 1997–2012
- Preceded by: Bob Connor
- Succeeded by: Nicole Poore

Personal details
- Born: January 15, 1947 Howard Air Force Base, Panama
- Died: June 30, 2024 (aged 77) Delaware, US
- Party: Republican
- Spouse: Bob Connor

Dorinda "Dori" Ann Connor (née Clark; January 15, 1947 – June 30, 2024) was an American politician. She succeeded her husband Bob Connor who died in office by winning a special election in 1997. In the 2012 Delaware Senate election, Connor was unseated by Democrat Nicole Poore.

Connor died in 2024, after a ten-year battle with Parkinson's disease.
