= Delaware's 15th Senate district =

American legislative district

Delaware's 15th State Senate district
Senator
Dave Lawson; R–Marydel
- Registration: 39.8% Democratic; 33.5% Republican; 26.7% No party preference
- Demographics: 73% White; 16% Black; 6% Hispanic; 1% Asian; 1% Native American; 3% Other
- Population (2018): 48,325
- Registered voters: 35,343

Delaware's 15th Senate district is one of 21 districts in the Delaware Senate. It has been represented by Republican Dave Lawson since 2011.

== Geography ==
District 15 covers much of Kent County to the west of Dover, including Cheswold, Felton, Kenton, Marydel, Hartly, Willow Grove, Petersburg, Sandtown, and part of Viola. It borders the state of Maryland.

Like all districts in the state, the 15th Senate district is located entirely within Delaware's at-large congressional district. It overlaps with the 11th, 28th, 29th, 30th, and 33rd districts of the Delaware House of Representatives.

== Recent election results ==
Delaware Senators are elected to staggered four-year terms. Under normal circumstances, the 15th district holds elections in presidential years, except immediately after redistricting, when all seats are up for election regardless of usual cycle.

=== 2020 ===
2020 Delaware Senate election, District 15
Party	Candidate	Votes	%
Republican	Dave Lawson (incumbent)	14,587	55.3
Democratic	Jacqueline Hugg	11,773	44.7
Total votes		26,360	100
Republican hold			

=== 2016 ===
2016 Delaware Senate election, District 15
Party	Candidate	Votes	%
Republican	Dave Lawson (incumbent)	15,036	100
Total votes		15,036	100
Republican hold			

=== 2012 ===
2012 Delaware Senate election, District 15
Party	Candidate	Votes	%
Republican	Dave Lawson (incumbent)	9,547	50.6
Democratic	Kathleen Cooke	9,004	47.7
Independent	Catherine Samardza	324	1.7
Total votes		18,875	100
Republican hold			

=== Federal and statewide results ===
Year	Office	Results
2020	President	Trump 53.4 – 44.9%
2016	President	Trump 56.3 – 38.8%
2014	Senate	Wade 52.2 – 45.8%
2012	President	Romney 51.9 – 46.6%
2012	Senate	Carper 58.3 – 37.4%
2012	Governor	Markell 58.3 – 39.4%
