= Delaware's 7th Senate district =

American legislative district

Delaware's 7th State Senate district
Senator
Spiros Mantzavinos; D–Westgate Farms
- Registration: 49.3% Democratic; 22.7% Republican; 28.0% No party preference
- Demographics: 69% White; 8% Black; 18% Hispanic; 3% Asian; 2% Other
- Population (2018): 42,239
- Registered voters: 30,380

Delaware's 7th Senate district is one of 21 districts in the Delaware Senate. It has been represented by Democrat Spiros Mantzavinos since 2020, following his defeat of incumbent Republican Anthony Delcollo.

== Geography ==
District 7 covers the immediate western suburbs of Wilmington in New Castle County, including Elsmere, Newport, Westminster, Anglesey, and other unincorporated areas.

Like all districts in the state, the 7th Senate district is located entirely within Delaware's at-large congressional district. It overlaps with the 4th, 13th, 19th, and 21st districts of the Delaware House of Representatives.

== Recent election results ==
Delaware Senators are elected to staggered four-year terms. Under normal circumstances, the 7th district holds elections in presidential years, except immediately after redistricting, when all seats are up for election regardless of usual cycle.

=== 2020 ===
2020 Delaware Senate election, District 7
Party	Candidate	Votes	%
Democratic	Spiros Mantzavinos	10,399	51.4
Republican	Anthony Delcollo (incumbent)	9,851	48.6
Total votes		20,250	100
Democratic gain from Republican			

=== 2016 ===
2016 Delaware Senate election, District 7
Party	Candidate	Votes	%
Republican	Anthony Delcollo	9,604	50.5
Democratic	Patricia Blevins (incumbent)	9,398	49.5
Total votes		19,002	100
Republican gain from Democratic			

=== 2012 ===
2012 Delaware Senate election, District 7
Primary election
Party	Candidate	Votes	%
Democratic	Patricia Blevins (incumbent)	13,756	92.4
Libertarian	James Christina	1,139	7.6
Total votes		14,895	100
Democratic hold			

=== Federal and statewide results ===
Year	Office	Results
2020	President	Biden 61.9 – 36.3%
2016	President	Clinton 55.3 – 39.1%
2014	Senate	Coons 59.7 – 37.6%
2012	President	Obama 63.7 – 34.6%
2012	Senate	Carper 71.2 – 24.5%
2012	Governor	Markell 74.1 – 23.6%
