= Myrna L. Bair =

US politician and academic (1940–2024)

Myrna L. Bair (October 26, 1940 – January 29, 2024) is an American politician and educator.

Bair served in the Delaware Senate for the 5th district of Delaware from 1980 to 2000 and had been a public advisor and assistant professor in the Institute for Public Administration at the University of Delaware. Bair was born in Huntington, West Virginia. She received her B.S. degree in chemistry from the University of Cincinnati and her Ph.D. in inorganic chemistry from the University of Wisconsin. Blair taught chemistry at Beaver College in Pennsylvania. She was elected as a Republican in 1980 to the Delaware Senate and represented the 5th District in north Wilmington and served until 2000. With an interest in children's issues, she was instrumental in the creation of the Office of the Child Advocate and the Department of Services for Children, Youth and Their Families in Delaware. She was inducted into the Hall of Fame of Delaware Women in 2011, won the “Women Who Make a Difference” Award from the International Women's Forum in 2000 and won the “Order of the First State” Award from Governor Thomas R. Carper in 2000.

She died peacefully on January 29, 2024. Governor of Delaware John Carney has ordered flags to be lowered to half-staff in a mark of respect and her service to Delaware. Her funeral was on February 7, 2025, and be buried at Gracelawn Memorial Park in New Castle Delaware.
