= Catherine Cloutier =

American politician (born 1950)

Member of the Delaware Senate from the 5th district
- In office January 9, 2001 – January 12, 2021
- Preceded by: Myrna Bair
- Succeeded by: Kyle Evans Gay

Member of the Delaware House of Representatives from the 11th district
- In office January 12, 1999 – January 9, 2001
- Preceded by: Philip Cloutier
- Succeeded by: Gregory Lavelle

Personal details
- Born: July 25, 1950 (age 75) Springfield, Massachusetts, U.S.
- Party: Republican
- Spouse: Philip Cloutier (died 1998)
- Website: cathycloutier.com

Catherine A. Labonte Cloutier (born July 25, 1950) is an American politician and a former Republican member of the Delaware Senate from January 9, 2001, to January 12, 2021, representing District 5. Cloutier served in the Delaware House of Representatives from 1999 to 2001, after taking over the seat when her husband, former Lieutenant Governor of Delaware candidate Philip D. Cloutier, died in office in 1998. Senator Cloutier served as the minority whip in the 150th General Assembly.

== Elections ==
- In 1998, Cloutier was unopposed for the House District 11 Republican primary and won the general election with 4,584 votes (72.9%) against Democratic nominee Michael Paul.
- In 2000, Cloutier won the Republican primary for Senate District 5 with 1,529 votes (68.6%), and won the general election with 8,099 votes (52.2%) against Democratic nominee William McGlinchey.
- In 2002, Cloutier was unopposed for both the Republican primary and the general election, winning with 9,446 votes.
- In 2006, Cloutier was unopposed for the Republican primary and won the general election with 6,945 votes (52.6%) against Democratic nominee Patricia Morrison.
- In 2010, Cloutier was unopposed in the Republican primary and won the general election with 7,814 votes (54.9%) against Democratic nominee Christopher Counihan. Cloutier also qualified and received votes as the Working Families Party candidate.
- In 2012, Cloutier and Counihan were both unopposed for their primaries, setting up a rematch of their 2010 race. Cloutier won the general election with 12,912 votes (56.2%) over Counihan.
- In 2016, Cloutier was unopposed for the Republican primary and won the general election with 13,407 votes (59.5%) against Democratic nominee Denise Bowers.
- In 2020, Cloutier was defeated by Democratic nominee Kyle Evans Gay.

Delaware House of Representatives
Preceded by Philip Cloutier	Member of the Delaware House of Representatives from the 11th district 1999–2001	Succeeded by Gregory Lavelle
Delaware Senate
Preceded by Myrna Bair	Member of the Delaware Senate from the 5th district 2001–2021	Succeeded by Kyle Evans Gay
