= David McBride =

American politician

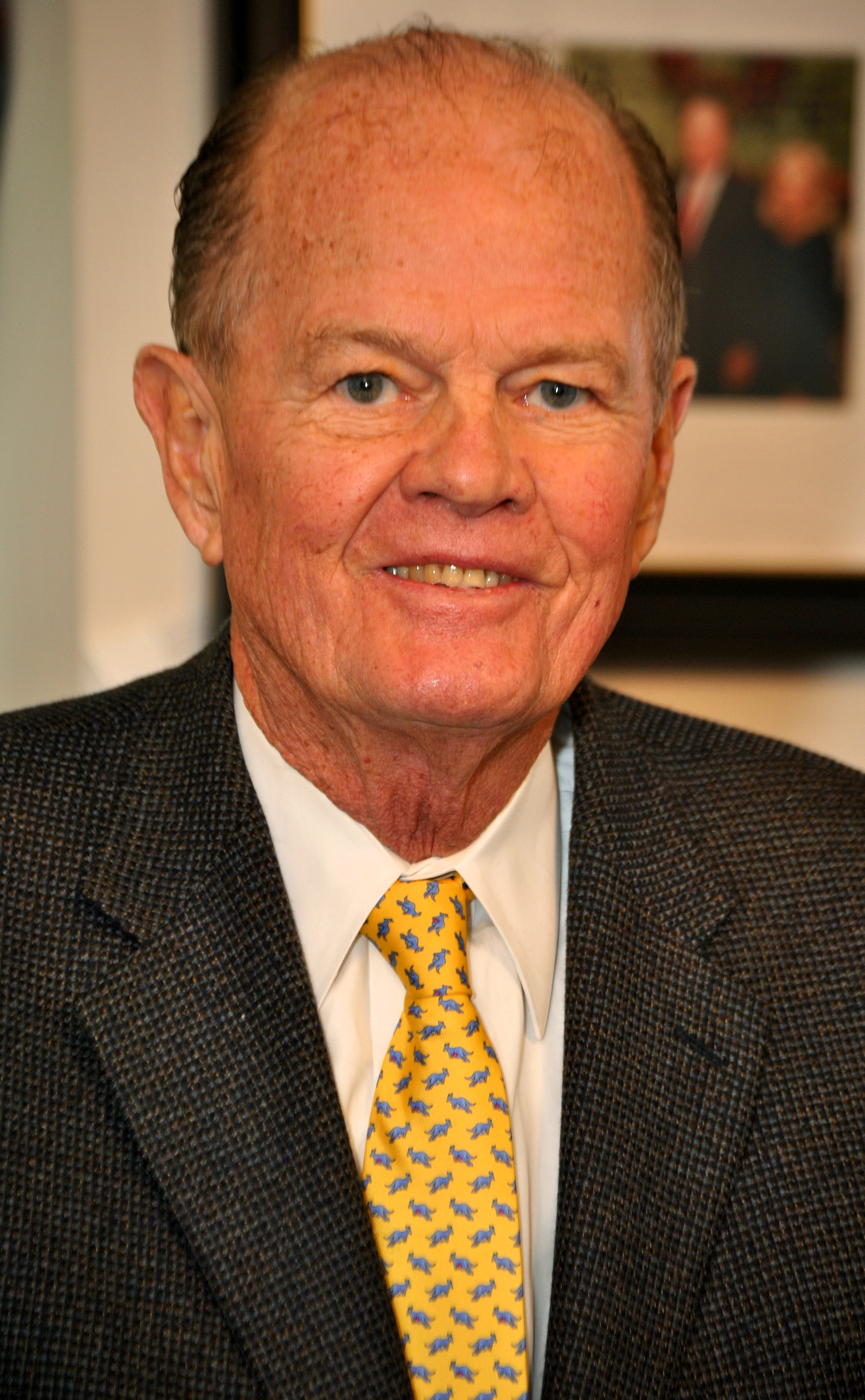

President pro tempore of the Delaware Senate
- In office January 17, 2017 – November 4, 2020
- Preceded by: Patricia Blevins
- Succeeded by: David Sokola

Majority Leader of the Delaware Senate
- In office January 8, 2013 – January 17, 2017
- Preceded by: Patricia Blevins
- Succeeded by: Margaret Rose Henry

Member of the Delaware Senate from the 13th district
- In office November 5, 1980 – November 4, 2020
- Preceded by: Francis J. Kearns
- Succeeded by: Marie Pinkney

Member of the Delaware House of Representatives from the 15th district
- In office November 7, 1978 – November 4, 1980
- Preceded by: Robert L. Byrd
- Succeeded by: John Campanelli

Personal details
- Born: June 23, 1942 (age 84) Wilmington, Delaware, U.S.
- Party: Democratic
- Spouse(s): Mary (divorced); Kei (divorced)
- Education: University of Delaware (BS, MS)

Military service
- Allegiance: United States
- Branch/service: United States Air Force
- Years of service: 1961–1969
- Rank: Staff Sergeant

David B. McBride (born June 23, 1942) is an American politician who served in the Delaware General Assembly for forty-two years. After serving one term in the Delaware House of Representatives from the 15th district, he was elected to the Delaware Senate from the 13th district in 1980 and served there for 40 years. A member of the Democratic Party, he was elected majority leader in the senate before becoming president pro tempore during his last four years in office. In 2020, he was defeated by Marie Pinkney in the Democratic primary.

== Early and personal life ==
McBride was born on June 23, 1942, in Wilmington, Delaware. He served in the United States Air Force from 1961 to 1969, including at Lackland Air Force Base in 1961, Sheppard Air Force Base from 1961 to 1962, Maxwell Air Force Base from 1962 to 1963, Kadena Air Base from 1963 to 1964, Fuchū Air Base from 1964 to 1967, U-Tapao Royal Thai Navy Airfield in 1967, and Langley Air Force Base from 1968 to 1969.

He graduated from Conrad High School in 1960. During his time in the service, he took various secondary courses at several universities in the United States and Japan. After returning to Delaware, he graduated from the University of Delaware with a BS in civil engineering in 1972 and a MS in civil engineering in 1975.

In 1984, he married Mary, but they later divorced. McBride had previously been married to Kei, with whom he had a son, David Jr. On April 12, 1985, McBride's son died at age 16 from injuries he had received in a car accident early in the week.

== Career ==
=== Business ===
In 1985, Southern Delaware Home Health Care Agency Incorporated, a non-profit home health care business run by David and his wife Mary, was investigated by the United States Department of Justice for over-billing patients and found to owe over $73,000 in overpayments. They closed their business shortly after the investigation was launched. Eleven employees of the business later filed a lawsuit for over $8,600 in unpaid wages and benefits. By 1986, the business owned the federal government nearly $80,000 due to interest on the unpaid principal. In 2012 McBride joined Duffield Associates’ Client Services group as a senior manager for client services and marketing. He has been a registered professional engineer in Delaware since 1976.

=== Politics ===
In 1976, McBride ran for a seat on the Conrad Area School district school board and defeated Charles E. Ballard for the seat with 1,131 votes to Ballard's 91 votes. He was selected to serve as vice-president of the Conrad school board in 1977. In 1978, McBride announced that he would seek the Democratic nomination for a seat in the Delaware House of Representatives from the 15th district against incumbent Representative Robert L. Byrd. McBride defeated Byrd in the Democratic primary and won in the general election. During his tenure in the Delaware House of Representatives, he served on the Community Affairs committee and as chairman of the Education committee.

In 1980, Francis J. Kearns, a member of the Delaware Senate, announced that he would not seek reelection. McBride received the Democratic nomination to run in the 13th district and faced no opposition in the general election. He was reelected every four years with no opponents running against him until 2020, when he was defeated in the Democratic primary by Marie Pinkney.

He was appointed to serve as chairman of the Education committee in the Delaware Senate in 1981. In 1991, he was appointed to serve on the Education, Health and Social Service/Aging, Revenue and Taxation, Labor and Industrial Relations, and Finance committees. From 2013 to 2017, he served as Majority Leader of the Delaware Senate. In 2016, he was nominated to serve as President Pro Tempore of the Delaware Senate after President Pro Tempore Patricia Blevins was defeated by a Republican in the 2016 general election.

In 1984, while serving in the state senate, McBride announced that he would seek the Democratic nomination for lieutenant governor. McBride selected Robert P. Hopkins, who had unsuccessfully sought election to the Delaware House of Representatives, to serve as his campaign manager. During the campaign he was endorsed by Millsboro Commissioner James Smith, Elsmere Mayor John Mitchell, and Kent County Levy Court Commissioner Louis J. Giusto. McBride was also endorsed by Representative Al O. Plant, but Plant later switched his endorsement to S. B. Woo. In the Democratic primary he placed last in third place behind Nancy Cook and Woo. During the campaign McBride has spent $38,793 and held unpaid debt due to his campaign until 1991.

== Electoral history ==
David McBride electoral history

1976 Conrad Area School district school board election
| Party | Candidate | Votes | % |
|---|---|---|---|
| Nonpartisan | David McBride | 1,131 | 92.55% |
| Nonpartisan | Charles E. Ballard | 91 | 7.45% |
| Total votes | | 1,222 | 100.00% |

1978 Delaware House of Representatives 15th district election
Primary election
| Party | Candidate | Votes | % |
|---|---|---|---|
| Democratic | David McBride | 931 | 61.53% |
| Democratic | Robert L. Byrd (incumbent) | 582 | 38.47% |
| Total votes | | 1,513 | 100.00% |
General election
| Democratic | David McBride | 3,109 | 79.82% |
| Republican | Catherine J. Kelly | 686 | 17.61% |
| Independent | Paul DeBruyne | 81 | 2.08% |
| American | Harvey I. Warren Jr. | 19 | 0.49% |
| Total votes | | 3,895 | 100.00% |

1982 Delaware Senate 13th district election
| Party | Candidate | Votes | % |
|---|---|---|---|
| Democratic | David McBride | 6,485 | 100.00% |
| Total votes | | 6,485 | 100.00% |

1984 Delaware Lieutenant Governor Democratic primary
| Party | Candidate | Votes | % |
|---|---|---|---|
| Democratic | S. B. Woo | 14,131 | 41.59% |
| Democratic | Nancy Cook | 10,590 | 31.16% |
| Democratic | David McBride | 9,260 | 27.25% |
| Total votes | | 33,981 | 100.00% |

1986 Delaware Senate 13th district election
| Party | Candidate | Votes | % |
|---|---|---|---|
| Democratic | David McBride (incumbent) | 4,477 | 65.90% |
| Republican | D. Drew Angeline | 2,317 | 34.10% |
| Total votes | | 6,794 | 100.00% |

1990 Delaware Senate 13th district election
| Party | Candidate | Votes | % |
|---|---|---|---|
| Democratic | David McBride (incumbent) | 5,197 | 100.00% |
| Total votes | | 5,197 | 100.00% |

1992 Delaware Senate 13th district election
| Party | Candidate | Votes | % |
|---|---|---|---|
| Democratic | David McBride (incumbent) | 9,231 | 100.00% |
| Total votes | | 9,231 | 100.00% |

1996 Delaware Senate 13th district election
| Party | Candidate | Votes | % |
|---|---|---|---|
| Democratic | David McBride (incumbent) | 9,300 | 100.00% |
| Total votes | | 9,300 | 100.00% |

2000 Delaware Senate 13th district election
| Party | Candidate | Votes | % |
|---|---|---|---|
| Democratic | David McBride (incumbent) | 11,190 | 100.00% |
| Total votes | | 11,190 | 100.00% |

2002 Delaware Senate 13th district election
| Party | Candidate | Votes | % |
|---|---|---|---|
| Democratic | David McBride (incumbent) | 6,337 | 100.00% |
| Total votes | | 6,337 | 100.00% |

2006 Delaware Senate 13th district election
| Party | Candidate | Votes | % |
|---|---|---|---|
| Democratic | David McBride (incumbent) | 7,152 | 100.00% |
| Total votes | | 7,152 | 100.00% |

2010 Delaware Senate 13th district election
| Party | Candidate | Votes | % |
|---|---|---|---|
| Democratic | David McBride (incumbent) | 8,736 | 100.00% |
| Total votes | | 8,736 | 100.00% |

2012 Delaware Senate 13th district election
| Party | Candidate | Votes | % |
|---|---|---|---|
| Democratic | David McBride (incumbent) | 14,444 | 100.00% |
| Total votes | | 14,444 | 100.00% |

2016 Delaware Senate 13th district election
| Party | Candidate | Votes | % |
|---|---|---|---|
| Democratic | David McBride (incumbent) | 14,503 | 100.00% |
| Total votes | | 14,503 | 100.00% |

2020 Delaware Senate 13th district Democratic primary
| Party | Candidate | Votes | % |
|---|---|---|---|
| Democratic | Marie Pinkney | 3,111 | 52.37% |
| Democratic | David McBride (incumbent) | 2,829 | 47.63% |
| Total votes | | 5,940 | 100.00% |

Delaware Senate
| Preceded by Patricia Blevins | Majority Leader of the Delaware Senate; 2013–2017 | Succeeded by Margaret Rose Henry |
| Preceded by Patricia Blevins | President pro tempore of the Delaware Senate; 2017–2020 | Succeeded by David Sokola |
