= 2017 United States state legislative elections =

- November 7, 2017

3 legislative chambers 2 states (Note: The Washington Senate flipped from Republican to Democratic via a special election)
	Majority party	Minority party	Third party
Party	Republican	Democratic	Coalition
Chambers before	66	29 (Note: The Connecticut Senate was tied in the 2017-2019 session. Democrats controlled more voting power due to holding the Lieutenant Governor's office, but both parties controlled legislative action. The chamber is not counted towards either total here.)	3 (Note: The Alaska House of Representatives is controlled by a coalition of Democrats, Republicans, and independents. The minority caucus consists of Republicans who are not part of the majority coalition.) (Note: The New York Senate was controlled by a coalition of Republicans and members of the Independent Democratic Conference) (Note: One Democrat caucused with Republicans to form the Majority Coalition Caucus)
Chambers after	66	30	2
Overall change	Steady	▲1	▼1
- Map of upper house elections: Democrats retained control Democrats gained control Special elections held

- Map of lower house elections: Democrats retained control Republicans retained control Special elections held

The 2017 United States state legislative elections were held on November 7, 2017. Three legislative chambers in two states held regularly scheduled elections. These off-year elections coincided with other state and local elections, including gubernatorial elections in two states.

Democrats won control of the Washington Senate through a special election for a seat previously held by a Republican, ending Republican-led coalition control there. Meanwhile, in regularly scheduled elections, Democrats maintained control of the New Jersey legislature and narrowed Republican control of the Virginia House of Delegates.

== Summary table ==
Regularly scheduled elections were held in 3 of the 99 state legislative chambers in the United States. Nationwide, regularly scheduled elections were held for 220 of the 7,383 legislative seats. This table only covers regularly scheduled elections; additional special elections took place concurrently with these regularly scheduled elections.

State	Upper House				Lower House			
State	Seats up	Total	% up	Term	Seats up	Total	% up	Term
New Jersey	40	40	100	2/4 (Note: The upper houses of Arkansas, Delaware, Florida, Hawaii, Illinois, Minnesota, New Jersey, and Texas use a 2-4-4 term length system.)	80	80	100	4
Virginia	0	0	100	4	100	100	100	2

== State summaries ==
=== New Jersey ===
All seats of the New Jersey General Assembly were up for election to two-year terms in coterminous two-member districts. The New Jersey Senate held elections for four-year terms. Democrats maintained majority control of both houses with expanded majorities.

Senate
Party	Leader	Before	After	Change
Democratic	Stephen Sweeney	24	25	▲1
Republican	Thomas Kean Jr.	16	15	▼1
Total		40	40	

General Assembly
Party	Leader	Before	After	Change
Democratic	Vincent Prieto	52	54	▲2
Republican	Jon Bramnick	28	26	▼2
Total		80	80	

=== Virginia ===
All seats of the Virginia House of Delegates were up for election in single-member districts. Delegates serve terms of two years. Democrats gained 15 seats and fell one seat short of a majority.

House of Delegates
Party	Leader	Before	After	Change
Republican	William J. Howell	66	51	▼15
Democratic	David Toscano	34	49	▲15
Total		100	100	

== Special elections ==
=== Delaware ===
- Delaware's 10th state senate district special election, 2017: A February 25 special election for the Delaware Senate seat left vacant by Bethany Hall-Long when she became the state's lieutenant governor was won by Democrat Stephanie Hansen.

=== Florida ===
- The Florida Senate seat formerly held by Frank Artiles, who had resigned after using racial slurs to describe fellow legislators. The seat was won by Annette Taddeo with 51% of the vote.

=== Georgia ===
- An April 18 special election for the Georgia Senate seat left vacated by Judson Hill when he decided to run for US Congress 6th district seat vacated by Tom Price who was appointed Health and Human Services Secretary. Democratic candidate Christine Triebsch and Republican candidate Kay Kirkpatrick ran for the vacated Georgia State Senate seat, which was won by Kirkpatrick.
- Democrats also picked up two seats previously held by Republicans in the Georgia House of Representatives, as well as advancing two candidates to a runoff election for a Georgia State Senate seat formerly held by a Republican.

=== Louisiana ===
- Republicans picked up a total of one seat, in the Louisiana House of Representatives where Republican John Stefanski won a special election to the seat vacated by Democratic incumbent Jack Montoucet, who resigned to be appointed Secretary of the Louisiana Department of Wildlife and Fisheries by Governor John Bel Edwards.

=== New Hampshire ===
- Democrats won two seats in the New Hampshire House of Representatives.
- Then another seat New Hampshire House of Representatives changed to Democratic control on September 26, 2017.
- On October 24 a special election was held in Strafford 13 in the New Hampshire House of Representatives. Casey Conley, a Democrat, won comfortably.
- On November 7, Democrats won a fourth seat in the New Hampshire House of Representatives with Democratic Erika Connors winning an election to fill a vacancy for the Hillsborough 15 district caused by the death of Republican Rep. Steve Vaillancourt.

=== New York ===
- There was a special election in the heavily Republican New York Assembly District 9 on May 23, which was won by Democrat Christine Pellegrino 58–42. Trump had won the district with 60% of the vote.

=== Oklahoma ===
- Democrats flipped two seats in the Oklahoma House of Representatives, and one seat in the Oklahoma Senate.
- On November 14, Democrat Allison Ikley-Freeman won an Oklahoma Senate special election in the previously Republican-held 37th district by 31 votes.

=== Washington ===
- On November 7, several states held special elections. There was a special election to fill the Washington State Senate seat for the Washington's 45th legislative district. Since the State Senate was evenly split going into the election, the contest election determined the partisan balance of power in Washington. Democrat Manka Dhingra won a majority of votes in the first round of the election, but rules required the race to go to a second round regardless. In the second round, with over $9,000,000 spent on the election through campaign contributions and political action committee expenditures, with a small number of votes yet to be counted, Dhingra led by over a 10% margin. Anticipating the Dhingra victory, Democratic Senate Minority Leader Sharon Nelson described a comprehensive agenda for the 60-day legislative session beginning in January that included voting rights reform and campaign-finance disclosure revision, as well as women's reproductive health, clean energy and firearms safety measures. Dhingra won the second round.

== See also ==
- 2017 United States gubernatorial elections
