= 1998 Delaware Senate election =

- November 3, 1998

10 out of 21 seats in the Delaware Senate 11 seats needed for a majority
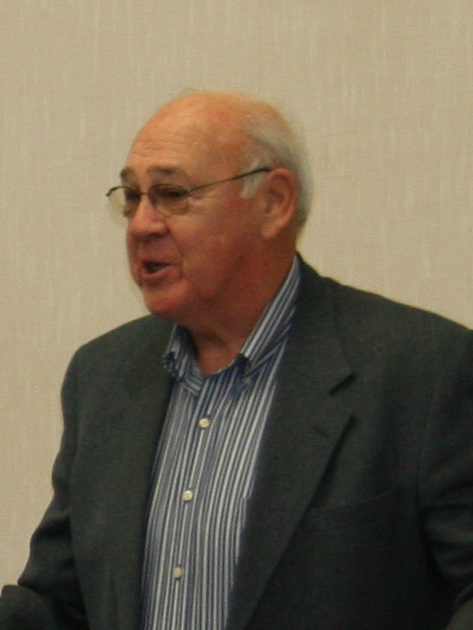

	Majority party	Minority party
Leader	Thomas Sharp	Steven Amick
Party	Democratic	Republican
Leader since	January 7, 1997
Leader's seat	9th - Wilmington	10th - Newark
Last election	12	9
Seats before	13 (Note: This figure includes Margaret Rose Henry who changed her party affiliation from Republican to Democrat in 1998.)	8
Seats after	13	8
Seat change	Steady	Steady
Popular vote	34,557	38,597
Percentage	46.50%	51.93%
President pro tempore before election
Thomas Sharp
Democratic
Elected President pro tempore
Thomas Sharp
Democratic

The 1998 Delaware Senate election was held on November 3, 1998, to determine which party would control the Delaware Senate for the following two years in the 140th Delaware General Assembly. Ten out of the 21 seats in the Delaware Senate were up for election and the primary was held on September 12, 1998. Prior to the election, 12 seats were held by Democrats and 9 seats were held by Republicans. The general election saw Democrats hold their majority in the State Senate.

== Results Summary ==
District	Incumbent	Party	Elected Senator	Party
2	Margaret Rose Henry	Dem	Margaret Rose Henry	Dem
3	Robert Marshall	Dem	Robert Marshall	Dem
4	Richard Hauge	Rep	Dallas Winslow	Rep
6	Liane Sorenson	Rep	Liane Sorenson	Rep
10	Steven Amick	Rep	Steven Amick	Rep
11	Donna Reed	Rep	Tony DeLuca	Dem
16	Colin Bonini	Rep	Colin Bonini	Rep
17	John Still III	Rep	John Still III	Rep
18	Robert Voshell	Dem	Gary Simpson	Rep
21	Robert Venables Sr.	Dem	Robert Venables Sr.	Dem

Party	Candi- dates	Votes		Seats		
Party	Candi- dates	No.	%	No.	+/–	%
Democratic	8	34,557	46.49%	13	Steady	61.90%
Republican	8	38,597	51.93%	8	Steady	38.10%
Constitution	1	1,171	1.58%	0	Steady	0.00%
Total	17	74,325	100%	21	Steady	100%

Popular vote
Republican	51.93%
Democratic	46.49%
Constitution	1.58%

Senate seats
Democratic	61.90%
Republican	38.10%

=== Retirements ===
1. Richard Hauge (R-District 4) retired, seat won by Dallas Winslow (R).
2. Robert Voshell (D-District 18) retired, seat won by Gary Simpson (R).

=== Defeated incumbents ===
1. Donna Reed (R-District 11) lost re-election to Tony DeLuca (D).

=== Closest races ===
Seats where the margin of victory was under 10%:

1. District 11, 3.84% (gain)
2. District 16, 5.18%
3. District 18, 6.26% (gain)

== Detailed Results ==
=== District 2 ===
Incumbent Republican turned Democrat Margaret Rose Henry has represented the 2nd district since 1994.

Delaware Senate 2nd district general election, 1998
Party	Candidate	Votes	%
Democratic	Margaret Rose Henry (incumbent)	4,626	100%
Total votes		4,626	100%
Democratic hold			

=== District 3 ===
Incumbent Democrat Robert Marshall has represented the 3rd district since 1979.

Delaware Senate 3rd district general election, 1998
Party	Candidate	Votes	%
Democratic	Robert Marshall (incumbent)	4,135	85.13%
Republican	Wesley N. Smith	722	14.87%
Total votes		4,857	100%
Democratic hold			

=== District 4 ===
Incumbent Republican Richard Hauge has represented the 4th district since 1989. Hauge didn't seek re-election and fellow Republican Dallas Winslow won the open seat.

Delaware Senate 4th district general election, 1998
Party	Candidate	Votes	%
Republican	Dallas Winslow	5,783	58.94%
Democratic	Kenneth W. Turoczy	4,028	41.06%
Total votes		9,811	100%
Republican hold			

=== District 6 ===
Incumbent Republican Liane Sorenson has represented the 6th district since 1995.

Delaware Senate 6th district general election, 1998
Party	Candidate	Votes	%
Republican	Liane Sorenson (incumbent)	7,885	87.07%
Constitution	Victoria Santoro	1,171	12.93%
Total votes		9,056	100%
Republican hold			

=== District 10 ===
Incumbent Republican and Minority Leader Steven Amick has represented the 10th district since 1995.

Delaware Senate 10th district general election, 1998
Party	Candidate	Votes	%
Republican	Steven Amick (incumbent)	4,932	64.02%
Democratic	Mark E. Amsler	2,772	35.98%
Total votes		7,704	100%
Republican hold			

=== District 11 ===
Incumbent Republican Donna Reed has represented the 11th district since 1995. Reed lost re-election to Democrat Tony DeLuca.

Delaware Senate 11th district general election, 1998
Party	Candidate	Votes	%
Democratic	Tony DeLuca	3,413	51.92%
Republican	Donna Reed (incumbent)	3,160	48.08%
Total votes		6,573	100%
Democratic gain from Republican			

=== District 16 ===
Incumbent Republican Colin Bonini has represented the 16th district since 1995.

Delaware Senate 16th district general election, 1998
Party	Candidate	Votes	%
Republican	Colin Bonini (incumbent)	4,155	52.59%
Democratic	Terry L. Pepper	3,745	47.41%
Total votes		7,900	100%
Republican hold			

=== District 17 ===
Incumbent Republican John Still III has represented the 17th district since 1989.

Delaware Senate 17th district general election, 1998
Party	Candidate	Votes	%
Republican	John Still III (incumbent)	5,502	100%
Total votes		5,502	100%
Republican hold			

=== District 18 ===
Incumbent Democrat Robert Voshell has represented the 18th district since 1993. Voshell didn't seek re-election and Republican Gary Simpson won the open seat.

Delaware Senate 18th district general election, 1998
Party	Candidate	Votes	%
Republican	Gary Simpson	6,458	53.13%
Democratic	Gary W. Downes	5,696	46.87%
Total votes		12,154	100%
Republican gain from Democratic			

=== District 21 ===
Incumbent Democrat Robert Venables Sr. has represented the 21st district since 1989.

Delaware Senate 21st district general election, 1998
Party	Candidate	Votes	%
Democratic	Robert Venables Sr. (incumbent)	6,142	100%
Total votes		6,142	100%
Democratic hold			
