= Charles B. Tanksley =

American politician

Member of the Georgia State Senate from the 32nd district
- In office 1995–2004
- Preceded by: Hugh A. Ragan
- Succeeded by: Judson Hill

Personal details
- Born: April 7, 1952 (age 74) Atlanta, Georgia, US
- Party: Republican
- Spouse: Kathryn Tanksley
- Children: 3
- Education: University of Virginia (BA); University of Georgia (JD)
- Occupation: Attorney
- Nickname: Charlie

Charles B. Tanksley (born April 7, 1952) is an American attorney and former politician. He was a five-term member of the Georgia Senate for the 32nd district, serving from 1995 to 2004 as a member of the Republican Party. He was first elected to the Senate in a special election held in January, 1995.

== Personal life and education ==
Tanksley was born in Atlanta, Georgia, and his home was the Vinings, Georgia, unincorporated community. He is a Methodist, is married to his wife, Kathryn, and they have three children. He graduated with a Bachelor of Arts with Distinction from the University of Virginia in 1974 and earned his Juris Doctor (JD) from the University of Georgia School of Law in 1978.

== Career ==
During his time in the Senate, Tanksley was the Senate floor leader for Governor Roy E. Barnes from 1998 to 2002. While Tanksley was a Republican, Barnes was a member of the Democratic Party and was Tankley’s former law partner. Tanksley also served as Chairman of the Senate Special Judiciary Committee from 1998 to 2002 and was chairman of the Energy Task Force.

After leaving the Senate in 2004, he joined the Atlanta office of Womble Carlyle Sandridge & Rice, PLLC where he lead the firm's Government Relations Practice Group in Georgia. Tanksley left Womble Carlyle to practice as a founding member of the Barnes Law Group where he was peer-voted as a member of the "Georgia Legal Elite" and after which he moved to Ponte Vedra Beach, Florida, as an emeritus member of the State Bar of Georgia.

Georgia State Senate
Preceded by Hugh A. Ragan	Member of the Georgia State Senate from the 32nd district 1995–2004	Succeeded by Judson Hill
