= Georgia's 32nd Senate district =

District in Metro Atlanta

Georgia's 32nd State Senate district
Senator
Kay Kirkpatrick; R–Marietta
- Demographics: 63.13% White; 13.22% Black; 12.09% Hispanic; 5.49% Asian; 0.20% Native American; 0.04% Hawaiian/Pacific Islander; 0.91% Other; 6.31% Multiracial
- Population (2020) • Voting age: 192,448; 149,879

District 32 of the Georgia Senate is located in northwestern Metro Atlanta.

The district includes western Cherokee County and north central Cobb County, including parts of Canton, Holly Springs, Kennesaw, Marietta, and Woodstock.

== Government ==
The current senator is Kay Kirkpatrick, a Republican from Marietta first elected in a special election in 2017. She succeeded Sen. Judson Hill, who had been in the office since 2005 and resigned in 2017 to run for Congress.

== Demography ==
The district has a population of 192,448, according to Georgia Senate Plan 2023.
