= Shanda (disambiguation) =

Shanda is a privately owned multinational investment firm.

Shanda may also refer to:

- Shengqu Games, formerly Shanda Games, a Chinese publisher and operator of online games
- Shanda Sharer (1979–1992), American murder victim
- Shanda Yates (born 1982), American politician

== See also ==
- Shonda
