= 2017 Delaware's 10th state senate district special election =

2017 Delaware Senate 10th District special election
- February 25, 2017

Delaware's 10th state senate district
- Turnout: 35.3%
Candidate	Stephanie Hansen	John Marino
Party	Democratic	Republican
Popular vote	7,110	5,127
Percentage	58.1	40.8

On February 25, 2017, voters in the 10th district of the Delaware Senate voted in a special election to fill the seat left vacant by Democrat Bethany Hall-Long, the previous incumbent, who had resigned at the beginning of the year after having been elected lieutenant governor the preceding November. Democrat Stephanie Hansen, an environmental lawyer from Middletown who had in the past served a term as New Castle County Council president, won with 58.1 percent of the vote, defeating Republican opponent John Marino, who finished with 40.8 percent. Libertarian John Lanzendorfer, the only other candidate in the race, claimed the other 1.1 percent.

Republicans had hoped that their party could capitalize on gains they had made in the 2016 elections in a potentially vulnerable district, where, despite a Democratic edge in voter registration, Marino had lost to Hall-Long by less than 300 votes in the 2014 election. Hansen's victory ensured that Democrats retained control of the state senate, where they had been the majority party since 1976. Since Delaware's House of Representatives had been controlled by Democrats for the preceding eight years, and no Republican had served as governor since 1993, Democrats also preserved their trifecta. Delaware was at that time one of only five U.S. states where the Democratic party controlled the executive and legislative branches of government.

The race attracted significant national media attention and interest from Democrats outside of Delaware, who, along with several liberal political action committees and labor unions, contributed more money to Hansen's campaign than both Marino and Hall-Long had spent combined in their 2014 contest, conscious of their party's frequently poor performance in special elections. Ultimately, she raised over a million dollars, ten times as much as a Delaware state legislative race usually costs, and a new record for any state legislative race and any special election in Delaware. Marino also raised a large amount of money for a state legislative race, but was still outspent. There were formal complaints from both sides over apparent collusion between the campaigns and outside groups. Republicans were also unhappy after the election when it was reported that some voters had been under the age of 18 due to a loophole in a recently passed election law.

Democrats both inside and outside the state saw the contest as a chance to respond electorally to the presidency of Donald Trump, which had led to widespread protests since his inauguration the month before. While Hansen and Marino primarily campaigned on local issues, Hansen touched on national concerns in her advertising and speeches. Former Delaware U.S. Senator Joseph Biden, whose term as vice president had ended at the same time Trump was sworn in, not only appeared at Hansen's fundraisers and in her campaign ads, but went door-to-door with her as well. Hansen's victory margin and the 35.3 percent voter turnout, better than usual for a special election, were seen as validating hopes that opposition to Trump could motivate Democrats to vote and possibly lead to greater success later that year and in the 2018 national midterm elections.

== Background ==
After Democratic dominance of the state in the late 19th century, neither party truly dominated Delaware politics for most of the 20th. That began to change in 1974, when Democrats gained control of the state senate and had held it ever since. The state's electoral votes for president had gone to Democrats ever since Bill Clinton was elected in 1992 and no Republican had served as governor since Dale E. Wolf's brief tenure at the beginning of the following year. William V. Roth's defeat in 2000 made him the last of his party to serve as one of the state's U.S. senators.

In 2008, with Delawarean Joseph Biden on the national ballot as the Democratic nominee for vice president, the state House swung to his party, and by 2010 Democrats had gained Delaware's sole seat in the U.S. House as well. Only Tom Wagner remained as the state auditor.

Starting with that year's elections, however, Republicans began regaining one state senate seat each election. By 2016, they had narrowed the Democratic advantage in the 21-member body to just two seats. That year's election created the possibility that the GOP could reclaim control when Patricia Blevins, the senate's president pro tempore, was narrowly upset by Anthony Delcollo in her suburban Wilmington district, and Bethany Hall-Long was elected lieutenant governor. She vacated her state senate seat to assume the position early in January 2017, requiring a special election to fill her seat in the 10th district.

=== The 10th Senate district ===
The state senate's 10th district is located in the western and southwestern areas of New Castle County, northernmost, most populous and politically the most Democratic of Delaware's three counties. It is a narrow strip, running north to south close to the state's western border with Maryland from just south of the University of Delaware campus in Newark, north of Interstate 95, through Glasgow, just west of Lums Pond State Park to Middletown and reaching east to the northwest vicinity of Odessa along Delaware Route 1, both of the latter south of the Chesapeake and Delaware Canal, which traditionally divides the state into northern and southern portions, the latter of which is more Republican-leaning. It is within commuting distance of Wilmington, Baltimore and Philadelphia by car and rail. Most of the district is either exurban residential subdivisions or worked fields, broken by occasional woodlots.

The 10th is a nominally Democratic district, with 45% of its registered voters affiliating with the party while only 28% are Republicans. However, that has in recent years not always translated into comfortable wins for Democratic candidates. In the 2014 elections, (Note: State senators from even-numbered districts such as the 10th are elected to four-year terms for the first eight years of a decade, and a two-year term at the end; therefore Hall-Long was not on the ballot in 2016.) in the middle of a presidential term when Democrats are less likely to vote, Bethany Hall-Long, who had generally won easily since her initial election in 2008, had her closest victory, with less than 300 votes, under 2% of the total, separating her and Republican John Marino, a retired New York City police officer and realtor who had made the district his home. In the 2016 presidential election, Hillary Clinton had carried the district with 54% of the vote, less than a percentage point above her victory margin statewide. Blevins, defeated the previous November, represented a district with more than twice as many registered Democrats as Republicans.

== Candidates ==
Before the date of the special election had been set, both parties had settled on candidates. In early December the state Republican Party announced it would nominate Marino for a second try at the seat. Before his narrow 2014 loss, he had also run a close race in 2010 for a state House seat held at the time by Rebecca Walker. He made his top campaign issue the purportedly stifling effect of one-party rule on Delaware and its citizens. One New Castle Democrat interviewed by the Wilmington News Journal, the state's largest newspaper, agreed, pointing out how Blevins had been appointed to lead the state's animal-welfare agency after her loss in the November election, despite possibly insufficient qualification for the job.

Democrats from the district committees in the 10th district met to hear from six potential candidates. Earl Jaques Jr., a state representative from a district in the Glasgow area whose winning electoral record had made him an early favorite for the nomination, had taken himself out of the running early on, citing a desire to spend more time with his family. After the group of 25 chose Hansen, New Castle County party chair Betsy Maron formally announced her as the nominee. Both candidates waited for the election date to be set to formally file their candidacies with the state's Department of Elections.

At the beginning of 2017, a third candidate, credit card fraud investigator Joseph Lanzendorfer, was also announced on the Libertarian line.

== Campaign ==
On January 17, 10 days after the state legislative session began, Hall-Long was sworn in as lieutenant governor and resigned her seat the same day. She retained her role in the senate, however, since as with many lieutenant governors and the U.S. vice president she is also the body's president. While it is a mostly ceremonial post, with the president pro tempore exercising the practical powers and authority of the job, one of those responsibilities that falls to the lieutenant governor is setting the date for special elections to vacated seats.

A week after taking her new office, Hall-Long finally announced that the special election for her former seat would be held a month and a day later, on February 25. Marino made an issue of the length of time it took to set the date, connecting it to one of his general campaign platforms that Delaware and its residents had suffered from eight unbroken years of Democratic control and it was time for voters to put an end to it. "Democrats have known for months what the date is going to be," he charged. "It is another example of the Dover insiders taking advantage of their power. They get the inside information."

Hansen made no response of her own other than to say she was happy she could finally give voters she had been talking to when visiting their houses a date. She did, however, criticize the senate minority for blocking new governor John Carney's appointment of former federal Environmental Protection Agency regional administrator Shawn Garvin to head the state's Department of Natural Resources and Environmental Control, whose previous role in the Obama Administration they had objected to. Hansen likened it to the obstructionist politics of their fellow Republicans in Congress.

While the election was for state office, both candidates appealed to the national political mood. Upon being announced as the Republican nominee, Marino told radio station WDDE that the presidential election a month earlier had revealed "a sense of frustration and disappointment, and a lack of trust with our elected officials and our leadership". His campaign slogan, "Make Delaware First Again", echoed Trump's "Make America Great Again", although he denied any intent to evoke the new president, calling on voters to stay focused on Delaware. "Casting a vote out of frustration of what's going on at the federal level is not the right direction to go," he told National Public Radio. Some Republican voters, tired of protests against Trump and his Cabinet picks, agreed with him.

Hansen, speaking at a local Women's March the day after Donald Trump's inauguration, said "[h]ate speech, divisiveness, exclusivity, misogyny will not rule the day because we won't let it." Later she told The New York Times that many of her encounters with Democratic voters began with "venting sessions" where they expressed their anger about the actions of Trump and the Republicans in Washington. "I will come up to houses and ... people are glued to their TV sets because you never know what craziness is going to pop up during the day."

=== Debate ===
The national issues shared the stage with local ones when the candidates debated on February 1. Supporters of both Hansen and Marino dominated the audience at the event, sponsored by news radio station WDEL-FM, whose Alan Loudell served as moderator, at Middletown High School, cheering and booing responses. The two major party candidates differentiated themselves on abortion, with Marino opposing it as "ripping a child out of a mother's womb" while Hansen and Lanzendorfer both said it was a decision that should be left to a woman and her physician. Marino called for Delaware to adopt a right-to-work law to improve its job creation, saying it need not be seen as anti-union, while Hansen opposed it as "the right to work for less."

Marino confronted Hansen at one point about her allegedly changing her position on whether parents should be allowed to opt their children out of standardized testing. In return she said that his active opposition to a successful December 2016 referendum on a capital improvement project for the Appoquinimink School District made him seem hypocritical when he claimed to support public education. Lanzendorfer said he disagreed with most other Libertarians on abolishing public education entirely, calling it an "extremist"' position. He called for schools to be funded out of taxes levied on legalized marijuana.

National issues entered the debate when the candidates were asked about Trump's executive order tightening immigration restrictions on visitors from seven predominantly Muslim countries, issued four days earlier and dominating the news at the time. Hansen and Lanzendorfer both condemned it, while Marino said the country should focus on its own citizens. This sparked some debate within the audience as to whether he had answered the question, and the extent to which the race was about Trump. "If we want to be able to keep the federal Republican agenda from settling in our living room, we have to be able to have our own fortification here at home", Hansen reiterated as to why voters should retain the Democratic majority in the Senate.

Hansen and Marino agreed on some issues. Neither said the state needed to raise taxes despite a $350 million deficit, and they opposed efforts to repeal Delaware's Coastal Zone Act, which limits industrial activities in that area of the state, although there were some areas where it could be relaxed to allow the redevelopment of former industrial sites. Marino also agreed with the others that it was not necessary to restore the state's death penalty, struck down as unconstitutional by the Delaware Supreme Court in August 2016, distinguishing himself from five of the state senate's Republicans, all of them former police officers as well, who have consistently supported it.

=== Endorsements ===
Two days before the election, Marino was endorsed by the National Federation of Independent Business (NFIB) Delaware Political Action Committee, based on his answers to their candidate survey. Pointing also to his own experience starting and running a small business, the NFIB said "Our members could certainly use more lawmakers that think along the same lines as Mr. Marino."

According to her campaign website, Hansen likewise earned the endorsements of several labor groups, including the Delaware State AFL–CIO, the state building trades organization, the District Council of Delaware Laborers, and the Delaware State Education Association, which represents the state's teachers. Mary Ann's List, an organization similar to the national Emily's List that works to raise funds for pro-choice Democratic women running for office in Delaware, also endorsed Hansen's candidacy, along with organizations speaking for the state's Chinese American and LGBT communities.

When you're out there knocking on doors for Stephanie, know that you're knocking on doors for their country that we care about, that country that says everybody gets a fair shot ... Fight as if the future of our country depends on it, because it just might.

— Martin O'Malley, February 11 speech to Hansen volunteers

No notable Republicans campaigned on Marino's behalf; state party chairman Charles Copeland said late in the campaign there had not been any outreach to them. For Hansen, however, Governor Carney made appearances, as did the state's two U.S. senators, Tom Carper (also formerly governor and the state's congressman) and Chris Coons (who had succeeded Hansen as New Castle County Council president in 2001). Martin O'Malley, who had sought the Democratic presidential nomination the preceding year, came over the state line from Maryland, where he had served as governor for two terms, to campaign for Hansen. He said the great interest Democrats nationally were showing in the race was a sign that they were "waking up to the reality that we've got to rebuild our party" at the state level, having grown complacent about those elections during the years when Barack Obama was president.

=== Fundraising ===
Shortly before the election, the News Journal reported on the required financial disclosures by the candidates' campaigns. Between January 27 and February 17, when the forms had to be filed, Hansen's campaign reported raising over $300,000 from Democrats not just in Delaware but around the country, from all 50 states, around 14,000 of those donations amounting to less than $100 each, of which she had spent just under half. A political action committee (PAC), First State Strong, that also entered the race on her behalf, had spent almost $400,000; it is, however, not required to disclose its donors until January 2018.

The newspaper speculated that Hansen and First State Strong were on pace to spend $1 million on the race, more than had ever been spent in any race for a seat in either house of the state legislature. Usually, it reported, candidates spend around $50,000 in their races, perhaps twice that if the election is vigorously contested. The money raised for Hansen allowed her campaign to afford commercials on Philadelphia TV stations, an expense normally beyond the budgets of state legislative campaigns even in the state's general elections.

National fundraising was directed to Hansen in part by two Democratically affiliated websites, Flippable.org and Sister District, which connect voters living in electorally safe districts to more marginal races where their dollars and volunteer efforts can potentially make a difference. Flippable, founded by a former Hillary Clinton campaign worker, alone raised $130,000 of Hansen's campaign contributions. Hansen said after the elections she was "shocked" by the support she got, attributing it to Democrats' desire to take a stand against the Trump presidency. "I think this movement had started and was looking for a vehicle, and we were that vehicle."

The cash flowing to her campaign also meant that Hansen, unlike most candidates, did not have to devote any of her time to making fundraising calls herself to potential large donors. Instead, she could devote all her campaigning time to voter contact. "She was out knocking on doors from 11 a.m. until dark," said her campaign manager, Erik Raser-Schramm.

Marino, by contrast, had spent a little over $65,000 during the same period. FirstStateFirst, a PAC supporting him, reported spending only $35,000. He called the amount of money coming into Hansen's campaign from all over the country "pretty gross", preferring to campaign by going door-to-door in person. "My hope is that the voters will see how much I care about this district and the issues that are facing it."

==== Allegations of election law violations by PACs ====
The involvement of the PACs drew formal complaints to the state's Elections Department from both sides.

Two weeks before the election, Delaware Republican chairman Charles Copeland alleged in his filing that First State Strong and the Delaware Building and Construction Trades Union Council had coordinated its activities with Hansen's campaign in violation of election law. The PAC, he claimed, had sent out mailers that attacked Marino, while a plumbers' union local that belonged to the building-trades council had distributed door hangers supporting Hansen and urging a vote for her during a weekend canvassing event. Copeland said these actions constituted express advocacy, forbidden to outside groups that coordinate their actions with candidates' campaigns.

Copeland also sharply criticized First State Strong for not voluntarily disclosing its donors, something it is not required to do until January 2018, which he said could instantly resolve the issue. He noted that a single one of the PAC's donations accounted for almost half the total money it had reported raising. "I can guarantee that [their ads are] being coordinated with the Hansen campaign," Copeland said. "And the Election Commissioner is duty bound to investigate this shadowy PAC and find the truth."

Raser-Schramm called the claims "absurd", noting that it was hypocritical of Copeland to make the allegations when he himself had raised money for many PACs promoting conservative causes while continuing to serve as state party chairman. First State Strong likewise called the allegations "frivolous". As to the door hangers, Building and Construction Trades Council president Jim Maravelias called Copeland's complaint "alternative facts", noting that election law permits unions to engage in express advocacy when communicating with their own members. He in turn accused Copeland and Republicans of trying "to divert voters' attention from their party's weak candidate."

After a preliminary investigation, state Elections Commissioner Elaine Manlove ruled that no express advocacy occurred in First State Strong's mailer, so there was no issue. The door hangers, on other hand, did engage in express advocacy, but a visit by Hansen to a meeting of a different branch of the building-trades council did not suffice to establish there had been coordination between the union group and her campaign. Copeland called the ruling "a sad day for Delaware" and said the party would appeal it in court.

On Hansen's side, Maravelias, also Delaware's AFL–CIO president, made a similar allegation against FirstStateFirst, arguing that since sitting Republican state senator Gregory Lavelle served as treasurer for both the PAC and Marino's campaign, using his home address to solicit donations for both. Manlove denied that complaint shortly before the election, saying that coincidence did not necessarily prove illegal collusion between the two.

=== Advertising ===
Hansen's well-funded campaign dominated the airwaves, with some of her ads using footage from anti-Trump protests. Both candidates tried to reach voters through their mailboxes. Both candidates took exception to some of the claims made about their records in attack ads sent as mailers. Hansen called a claim by Marino's campaign that she sought to increase the state's gas tax, based on something she had said in April 2015, "disingenuous", adding that it was not the time to do so in any event. She also dismissed a further claim that she would eliminate a property tax deduction for seniors as a scare tactic.

Marino likewise disputed some of the attacks on him. He particularly objected to a FirstStateStrong ad pointing out that he had lost two elections already, suggesting that this was because voters rejected his policies. In response, Marino noted that both of those losses had been close. He also rejected claims that he supported cuts to public education funding. "I have said from the start that a strong education system is one of the most important things we need to have."

=== Canvassing ===
In addition to the many donations, the national attention brought the Hansen campaign volunteers as well. Many showed up from all over Delaware to canvass, and the campaign told the News Journal it believed it had knocked on the door of every voter likely to support the candidate "at least once." Phone banks to reach those voters who were not able to answer their doors when canvassers knocked were organized by supporters as far away as San Francisco.

A thousand volunteers came into the district from Delaware and nearby states, half of them on the day of the election. For many, it was their first experience with a political campaign. With this many, the campaign had trouble finding enough voters for all of them to talk to; David Sokola, a Democratic state senator, told the Huffington Post that was more volunteers than he'd had in all nine of his election campaigns combined. By the time of the election staffers estimated that they had knocked on 90,000 doors and made 60,000 calls to voters.

Hansen, who was able to do a lot of canvassing herself since she did not need to worry about raising money herself, got one very high-profile volunteer the weekend before the election. A rumor that sitting Vice President Mike Pence would appear on Marino's behalf led Hansen's campaign to ask Joseph Biden, his Democratic predecessor, a six-term Delaware U.S. Senator who had also served on New Castle County Council, if he would appear for her. After he spoke at a fundraiser for her, he offered to do more. He appeared in radio and television ads for Hansen, telling voters the race was about "being able to look your kid in the eye and say, 'Honey, it's going to be O.K.'" He even said he was willing to go door-to-door with her talking to voters.

"Are you serious?" Hansen recalled asking him, in a New York Times story about the race. He was, and the two spent the last Saturday before the election visiting voters in the Newark area. While many of them were delighted to meet him, taking selfies with the former vice president and even in some cases imploring him to run for president in 2020, he reminded them that he was appearing for Hansen, and they should remember to vote for her. Copeland suggested to the Times that Biden's presence in the race along with other high-profile Democrats showed how weak their standing with voters in the state truly was.

== Election ==
The weather on February 25—unseasonably warm and clear—was seen as ideal for high voter turnout. A thunderstorm line that passed across the state around 4:30 p.m. only briefly deterred voters from going to the polls. By the time they closed at 8 p.m. 35.3% of all registered voters had cast ballots, well above the 10% who turn out for Delaware special elections on average. It was also more voters, and a greater percentage that had turned out for the 2014 election that Marino had almost won.

When all the votes were counted, Hansen was the clear winner, with 7,110 of the 12,376 votes cast, or 58.1%. Marino's total of 5,127 accounted for 40.8%. Lanzendorfer finished a distant third with 139 votes, 1.1% of the total.

Democrats pointed to more numerical indicators of successful campaigning than just the high turnout. Hansen had outperformed Hall-Long's 2014 total by more than a thousand votes. Her share of the vote, as well, was four percentage points better than that Hillary Clinton had gotten from the district's voters in November's presidential election. The News Journal calculated that Hansen's campaign had spent $102.40 for every vote Hansen had gotten, based purely on the amounts the campaign and First State Strong had reported by the election.

There were two issues on the day of the election. Some voters reported receiving calls that morning saying Hansen had withdrawn from the race. After they were reported to the Department of Elections, they were turned over to the state's Department of Justice for further investigation.

On the other side, Republicans were upset when they learned that some of the voters casting ballots were under the age of 18. State senator Gregory Lavelle, who served as Marino's campaign manager, said this was "outrageous" and filed a complaint of his own when he heard of it by noon that day. However, New Castle County's Election Department explained that state law allows those as young as 16 to register when they receive their driver's licenses, as long as they will be 18 by the next general election.

This was in accordance with a 2010 law intended to make it easier for teenagers to vote upon turning 18. "That was not the intent", Lavelle claimed, adding that it seemed to him that the Elections Department decisions seemed to be favoring Hansen, and that the department should have let the legislature know this could happen. He did not know at the time he raised the issue how many under-18 voters had voted, saying he would "wait and see". Marino's lopsided loss turned out to make the issue moot.

After accepting a congratulatory phone call from Biden, Hansen spoke to her supporters at the Odessa fire hall. She again connected the race to national politics. "It was the first chance for voters to declare with one loud voice that we're better than the politics of fear and division", she said. "I think tonight they're hearing us loud and clear in all corners of this country—and certainly in D.C. and in Dover."

Marino did not make a statement or appear publicly. But other Republicans spoke for him and their party. While commending Marino and his campaign for their work, Lavelle admitted "we knew it would not be easy." He conceded that for Democrats, "it absolutely was a national race".

Copeland, the state Republican chair, continued to accuse Democrats of buying the election. "[They] spent over $100 per vote in a district that they already had a 60-to-40 registration advantage," he said. "Once again, we are seeing what happens when one political party has absolute power ... corruption."

Delaware's 10th Senate District special election, 2017
Party	Candidate	Votes	%
Democratic	Stephanie Hansen	7,110	58.1
Republican	John Marino	5,127	40.8
Libertarian	Joseph Lanzendorfer	139	1.1

After being sworn in, Hansen was to complete Hall-Long's term, which would expire shortly after the 2018 general election. She had not said whether she would run for re-election then; should she do so, and win, she would serve a two-year term ending in 2020, with the term after that extending to 2022. (Note: Delaware state legislators elected in general elections begin their terms of office the day after they are elected although they are not formally sworn in until the January after that.)

== Aftermath ==
Democrats and their supporters nationally were delighted by the outcome. "On Saturday ... the voices in the streets turned into votes in the ballot box," the Huffington Post wrote, alluding to the protests against the Trump administration that had dominated the national news during the campaign. Former Labor Secretary Tom Perez, who had just the same day been elected chairman of the Democratic National Committee, tweeted: "Great work. We kept the majority in Delaware. Let's keep the momentum going, this is only the beginning."

Publicly, Delaware Republicans stuck with their line that Democrats had bought the election for Hansen. Two weeks after the election, Marino characterized the amount of money she raised, particularly from out of state, as "obnoxious, frankly." He said Delawareans "should be represented for their best interests, not the interests of lobbyists or people outside the state." Hansen responded that although many of the voters whose homes she visited started the conversation with national issues, "as soon as they got that off the chest, they wanted to talk about education or about the traffic or on job creation", all common issues in legislative races in any state. To make sure the campaign stayed local, staff allowed only volunteers who were themselves from Delaware to make calls at its phonebanking events.

However, Republican sources "on the ground", not named or directly quoted, who talked to Roll Call after the election offered more praise for Democratic efforts. Hansen's party, they said, took fuller advantage of changes in state campaign finance laws on coordination between outside groups and campaigns. They also credited the Democrats with exploiting the loophole that allowed some voters not yet 18 to cast ballots.

For Roll Call and the national media generally, the question was what this meant for Democrats going forward, particularly in the 2018 midterms, when the party might be able to retake control of Congress. While Democratic spirits, commentator Nathan Gonzales noted, were certainly buoyed by the win, "the realities surrounding the race are more sobering". The party expected a competitive race given the higher stakes than usual in most special elections for state legislative seats, and thus "flooded the zone" to win.

However, at the same time, "Republicans didn't put up much of a fight." Gonzales speculated that this may have been because Delaware has only one at-large U.S. House seat and thus national Republicans saw no possible advantage to be gained by control of the state's senate in redistricting following the 2020 census. He also suggested that Democrats overstated Republican strength in the 10th district, since Marino's close finish in 2014 may have had more to do with Hall-Long's husband getting arrested and charged stealing some of Marino's signs a week before the election (a qualifier also noted by David Weigel in The Washington Post) than any GOP gains in what may well have been their best possible election year in recent memory.

"The good news for Democrats is that demonizing President Donald Trump galvanized and mobilized Democratic voters", Gonzales wrote. However, Democrats would have to make that strategy work in tougher terrain than a Democratic-leaning state senate district in Delaware if they wanted to regain the 24 seats needed for a House majority in 2018. For example, if the party spent $137 per vote, roughly as much as it did on Hansen in a successful effort to win the nearby 7th district of Pennsylvania, a swing district currently represented by Republican Pat Meehan but which has voted for Democratic presidential candidates and representatives in the past, it would cost $16 million. Much depends on whether the Democrats can maintain a consistent level of engagement among its base over the next 20 months, as the Tea Party did for Republicans during the early years of the Obama administration. "[T]he biggest lesson out of this Delaware race," Gonzales concluded, "appears to be that when Democrats dramatically outspend Republicans in Democratic districts, Democrats win."

== See also ==
- Georgia's 6th congressional district special election, 2017, also seen by Democrats as an early referendum on Trump's presidency
- Politics of Delaware
- United States elections, 2017
