= Shonda =

Shonda is a feminine given name. Notable people with the name include:

- Shonda Kuiper, American statistician
- Shonda Rhimes (born 1970), American television producer and screenwriter
- Shonda Stanton, American softball coach

== See also ==
- LaShonda
- Shanda (disambiguation)
