= Shanda Yates =

American politician from Mississippi (born 1982)

Member of the Mississippi House of Representatives from the 64th district
- Incumbent
- Assumed office January 7, 2020
- Preceded by: Bill Denny

Personal details
- Born: Shanda M. Yates; March 29, 1982 (age 44) Jackson, Mississippi, U.S.
- Party: Independent (since 2022); Democratic (until 2022)
- Children: 1
- Education: Hinds Community College (AA); University of Southern Mississippi, (BA); Mississippi College School of Law, (JD)
- Occupation: Politician, attorney

Shanda M. Yates (born March 29, 1982) is an American politician, representing the 64th district in the Mississippi House of Representatives since 2020. She is an independent.

== Early life and education ==
Yates was born on March 29, 1982, in Jackson, Mississippi. She graduated from Hinds Community College in 2001 with an associate degree and then enrolled at the University of Southern Mississippi, graduating with honors and a bachelor's degree in English. She received her Juris Doctor from the Mississippi College School of Law in 2007, where she also served as an editor for the Mississippi College Law Review. She was admitted to the Mississippi Bar in 2007.

== Career ==
Yates practices as a partner with her husband as an attorney.

In February 2019, Mississippi Democratic House Minority Leader David Baria asked Yates if she wished to run against Bill Denny in the Mississippi House, a 32-year house incumbent of the 64th district and House Republican Floor Leader. She decided to run after initial reluctance, and over the months that followed, Yates and her campaign knocked on around 10,000 doors. Her campaign received assistance from national organizations like California-based Sister District, an organization that targets GOP-held seats. She proceeded through the Democratic Primary unopposed and, in the general election, won against Denny by 168 votes, a 51%–49% margin. She assumed office on January 7, 2020.

As of 2021, she serves on the following committees: Compilation, Revision and Publication; Corrections; Insurance; Judiciary B; Judiciary En Banc; and Transportation. Since 2020, she has served as Deputy Chair for the Mississippi House Democratic caucus leadership.

In January 2022, she left the Democratic Party and became an independent.

== Political positions ==
Yate's top priorities when running for election were increasing school funding and addressing infrastructure problems.

In 2020, Yates voted yes on the bill to change the Mississippi State Flag.

== Personal life ==
Yates is married to Yancy Burns, and they have one child. She and her husband are Methodist.
