= 2020 Delaware lieutenant gubernatorial election =

- November 3, 2020
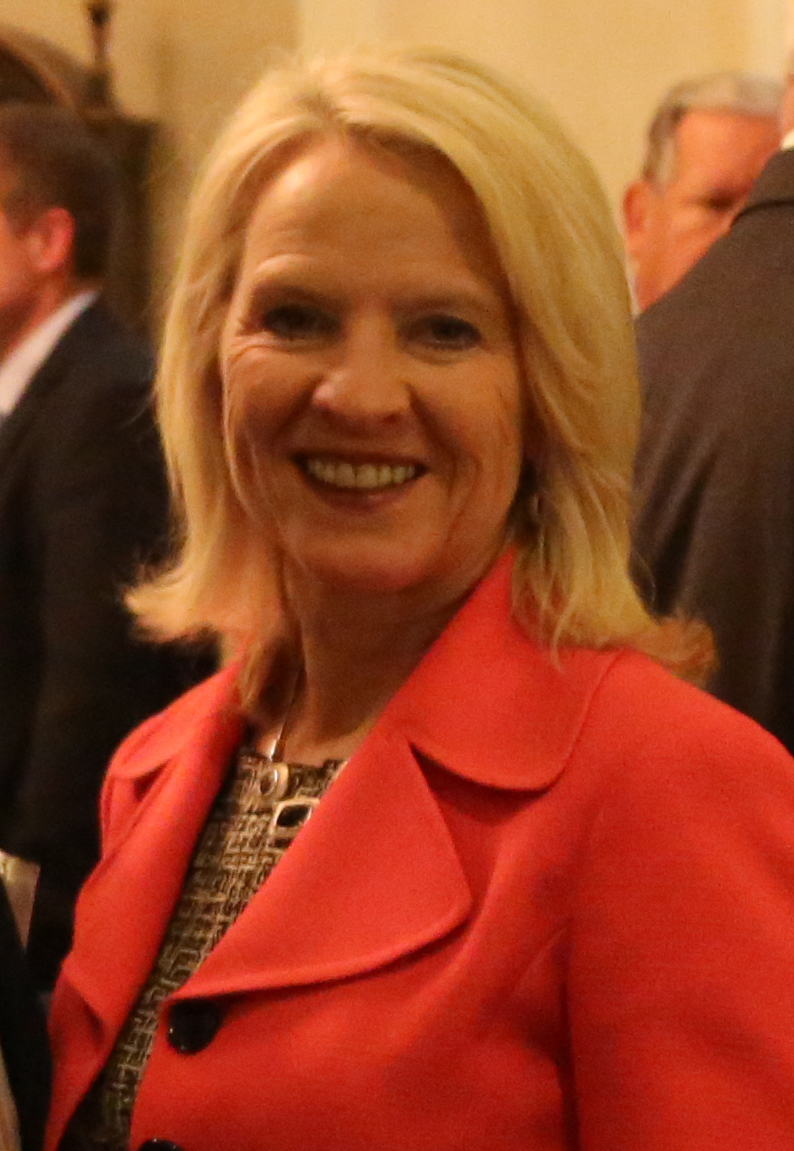

Nominee	Bethany Hall-Long	Donyale Hall
Party	Democratic	Republican
Popular vote	285,638	197,343
Percentage	59.14%	40.86%
- Hall-Long: 50–60% 60–70% 70–80% 80–90% >90% Hall: 50–60% 60–70% 70–80% No data
Lieutenant Governor before election
Bethany Hall-Long
Democratic
Elected Lieutenant Governor
Bethany Hall-Long
Democratic

The 2020 Delaware lieutenant gubernatorial election was held on November 3, 2020, to elect the lieutenant governor of Delaware, concurrently with the 2020 U.S. presidential election, as well as elections to the United States Senate and United States House of Representatives, and various state and local elections. Incumbent Democratic Lieutenant Governor Bethany Hall-Long won re-election to a second term.

== Democratic primary ==
=== Candidates ===
==== Nominee ====
- Bethany Hall-Long, incumbent lieutenant governor

== Republican primary ==
=== Candidates ===
==== Nominee ====
- Donyale Hall, president of the Frederick Douglass Foundation

==== Declined ====
- Andy Brockson, real estate agent
- Ernesto Lopez, state senator

== Independent Party of Delaware ==
=== Candidates ===
==== Withdrew ====
- Kevin Baron, veteran

== General election ==
=== Results ===
Delaware lieutenant gubernatorial election, 2020
Party	Candidate	Votes	%	±%
Democratic	Bethany Hall-Long (incumbent)	285,638	59.14%	−0.30%
Republican	Donyale Hall	197,343	40.86%	+0.30%
Total votes		482,981	100.0%	N/A
Democratic hold				

==== By county ====
County	Bethany Hall-Long Democratic		Donyale Hall Republican		Margin		Total votes
County	#	%	#	%	#	%	Total votes
Kent	42,903	51.0%	41,219	49.00%	1,684	2.0%	84,122
New Castle	186,389	67.97%	87,826	32.03%	98,563	35.94%	274,215
Sussex	56,298	45.21%	68,298	54.70%	-11,952	-9.58%	124,644
Totals	285,638	59.14%	197,343	40.86%	88,295	18.28%	482,981
