= David Brady (politician) =

American politician (1937–2023)

Member of the Delaware House of Representatives from the 8th district
- In office 1982–2002
- Preceded by: James Edwards
- Succeeded by: Bethany Hall-Long

Personal details
- Born: December 2, 1937 Chester, Pennsylvania, US
- Died: April 17, 2023 (aged 85) Claymont, Delaware, US
- Party: Democratic
- Spouse: Carol Ann
- Education: University of Delaware (BA, MEd); Delaware Law School (JD)

David D. Brady (December 2, 1937 – April 17, 2023) was an American educator and politician who served in the Delaware House of Representatives from 1982 through 2002.

== Personal life, education, and private career ==
Brady was born on December 2, 1937 in Chester, Pennsylvania.

Brady served in the U.S. Marine Corps from 1955 through 1959. Afterwards, he worked at a post office of the United States Postal Service from 1960 through 1966; and worked for the Chrysler Corporation in 1967 and 1968.

Brady attended the University of Delaware from 1968 through 1972, graduating with both a Master of Education in counseling and a Bachelor of Arts in history. During the same years, he worked at the Sun Oil Company. Brady later attended the Delaware Law School from 1978 to 1982, receiving a Juris Doctor.

From 1972 through 2006, Brady worked as an educator in the school districts of New Castle County, including as a visiting teacher in the Brandywine School District. He was also an instructor for the New Castle Parks & Recreation.

Brady was a resident of Claymont, Delaware. His civic work included coaching in the Claymont Independent League, and serving as a member of the Budget Oversight Committee of the Reach Academy for Girls (a charter school which opened in 2010, but was put on probation by the state in 2011 and which closed in 2014). He was also a member of the Naamans Heritage Society, Claymont Lions Club, Claymont Library Fundraising Committee, Claymont Historical Society, Claymont Centennial Committee, Center Green Civic Association, Adult & Community Education Association of Delaware.

== Politics ==
From 1982 to 2002, Brady served as a member of the Delaware House of Representatives, representing the 8th district as a Democrat.

Brady first won election in 1982, defeating incumbent Republican state representative James F. Edwards. The 1982 Delaware state legislative elections were closely contested, and Brady's election was one of six state house victories that allowed Democrats to flip control of the chamber. The elections were the first following a redistricting that followed the 1980 United States census, and Republicans blamed their losses on the new maps.

After the redistricting which followed the 2000 United States census, Brady found himself drawn into the 7th district. He unsuccessfully ran for re-election that district, but was defeated in the general election by its incumbent, Wayne A. Smith (a Republican, and the then-incumbent majority leader). Brady received 47% of the vote to Smith's 52%, with Libertarian nominee Barbara Beeghly receiving 1%. The coinciding race in the new version of the 8th district, which Brady was drawn out of, saw the election of Democrat Bethany Hall-Long.

Brady unsuccessfully sought to return to elected office in 2012, unsuccessfully challenging incumbent state representative Harris McDowell III in the Democratic primary for the district 1 seat of the Delaware Senate. In 2016, he unsuccessfully challenged incumbent Bryon Short in the Democratic primary for the district 7 seat in the Delaware House of Representatives. Originally, Short was forgoing re-election to the state house that year in order to run for U.S. Congress, and Brady was one of three running in the primary to succeed him. However, Short ultimately sought re-election, and Brady was the only candidate who remained in the race to challenge him. In 2022, he unsuccessfully ran for the district 8 seat in the Delaware House of Representatives.

== Death ==
Brady died at his home on April 17, 2023. Among his survivors was his widow, Carol Ann Brady, and their three children.
