= Steven H. Amick =

American politician (1947–2019)

Member of the Delaware Senate from the 10th district
- In office January 10, 1995 – January 13, 2009
- Preceded by: James P. Neal
- Succeeded by: Bethany Hall-Long

Member of the Delaware House of Representatives from the 25th district
- In office January 13, 1987 – January 10, 1995
- Preceded by: Marian P. Anderson
- Succeeded by: Stephanie Ulbrich

Personal details
- Born: May 13, 1947 Ithaca, New York, U.S.
- Died: January 23, 2019 (aged 71) Wilmington, Delaware, U.S.
- Party: Republican

Steven H. Amick (May 13, 1947 – January 23, 2019) was an American politician who served in the Delaware House of Representatives from the 25th district from 1987 to 1995 and in the Delaware Senate from the 10th district from 1995 to 2009.

He died on January 23, 2019, in Wilmington, Delaware at age 71.
