= Delaware's 10th Senate district =

American legislative district

Delaware's 10th State Senate district
Senator
Stephanie Hansen; D–Middletown
- Registration: 46.9% Democratic; 26.5% Republican; 26.6% No party preference
- Demographics: 67% White; 15% Black; 8% Hispanic; 8% Asian; 2% Other
- Population (2018): 45,084
- Registered voters: 34,875

Delaware's 10th Senate district is one of 21 districts in the Delaware Senate. It has been represented by Democrat Stephanie Hansen since 2017, following an expensive and intensely watched special election to replace fellow Democrat Bethany Hall-Long.

== Geography ==
District 10 is based in Middletown, also covering Mount Pleasant, Summit Bridge, western Glasgow, and the southernmost reaches of Newark.

Like all districts in the state, the 10th Senate district is located entirely within Delaware's at-large congressional district. It overlaps with the 8th, 9th, 25th, and 27th districts of the Delaware House of Representatives. It borders the state of Maryland.

== Recent election results ==
Delaware Senators are elected to staggered four-year terms. Under normal circumstances, the 10th district holds elections in midterm years, except immediately after redistricting, when all seats are up for election regardless of usual cycle.

=== 2024 ===
Delaware Senate 10th district general election, 2024
Party	Candidate	Votes	%
Democratic	Stephanie Hansen (incumbent)	19,510	100%
Total votes		19,510	100%
Democratic hold			

=== 2018 ===
2018 Delaware Senate election, District 10
Party	Candidate	Votes	%
Democratic	Stephanie Hansen (incumbent)	11,665	62.1
Republican	Christine Metzing	7,129	37.9
Total votes		18,794	100
Democratic hold			

=== 2017 special ===
Following Bethany Hall-Long's election as Lieutenant Governor of Delaware in 2016, a special election was held in February 2017.

2017 Delaware Senate special election, District 10
Party	Candidate	Votes	%
Democratic	Stephanie Hansen	7,315	58.1
Republican	John Marino	5,127	40.8
Libertarian	Joseph Lanzendorfer	139	1.1
Total votes		12,581	100
Democratic hold			

=== 2014 ===
2014 Delaware Senate election, District 10
Party	Candidate	Votes	%
Democratic	Bethany Hall-Long (incumbent)	6,230	51.1
Republican	John Marino	5,963	48.9
Total votes		12,193	100
Democratic hold			

=== 2012 ===
2012 Delaware Senate election, District 10
Party	Candidate	Votes	%
Democratic	Bethany Hall-Long (incumbent)	16,498	100
Total votes		16,498	100
Democratic hold			

=== Federal and statewide results ===
Year	Office	Results
2020	President	Biden 60.8 – 37.4%
2016	President	Clinton 54.0 – 40.5%
2014	Senate	Coons 56.1 – 41.9%
2012	President	Obama 58.6 – 39.9%
2012	Senate	Carper 67.4 – 29.1%
2012	Governor	Markell 71.2 – 26.8%
