= Bill Denny (Mississippi politician) =

American politician (1930–2025)

Majority Leader of the Mississippi House of Representatives
- In office January 3, 2012 – January 7, 2020
- Preceded by: ???
- Succeeded by: TBD

Member of the Mississippi House of Representatives from the 64th district
- In office January 1988 – January 7, 2020
- Preceded by: Dick Hall
- Succeeded by: Shanda Yates

Personal details
- Born: August 22, 1930 Washington, D.C., U.S.
- Died: January 25, 2025 (aged 94) Jackson, Mississippi, U.S.
- Party: Republican
- Spouse: Sue Johnsey
- Education: University of Maryland, College Park (BS)

William Clancy Denny Jr. (August 22, 1930 – January 25, 2025) was an American politician who served as a member of the Mississippi House of Representatives from 1988 to 2020. He was the floor leader of the Republicans in the house from 2012 to 2020.

== Life and career ==
Denny was an alumnus of the University of Maryland and worked as a business executive and banker. He was Senior Vice President of Southeastern Operations of a multi-national banking corporation.

Elected to the Mississippi House of Representatives in 1988, he served District 64, encompassing Hinds County and Madison County. He served on the Apportionment and Elections as chairman, and as member of the appropriations, congressional redistricting, constitution, Judiciary A, Judiciary En Banc, legislative reapportionment and municipalities committees.

In November 2019, Denny was defeated by Shanda Yates. The race was extremely close, with Yates winning by a margin of less than 150 votes (50.8% to 49.2%), and results took nearly two weeks to certify. His term ended on January 7, 2020.

Denny was married to Sue Rose Johnsey, and they had four children. He was Catholic. Denny died in Jackson, Mississippi, on January 25, 2025, at the age of 94.
