= Widener University Delaware Law School =

Private law school in Wilmington, Delaware

Coordinates: 39.817305°N 75.546042°W

Delaware Law School
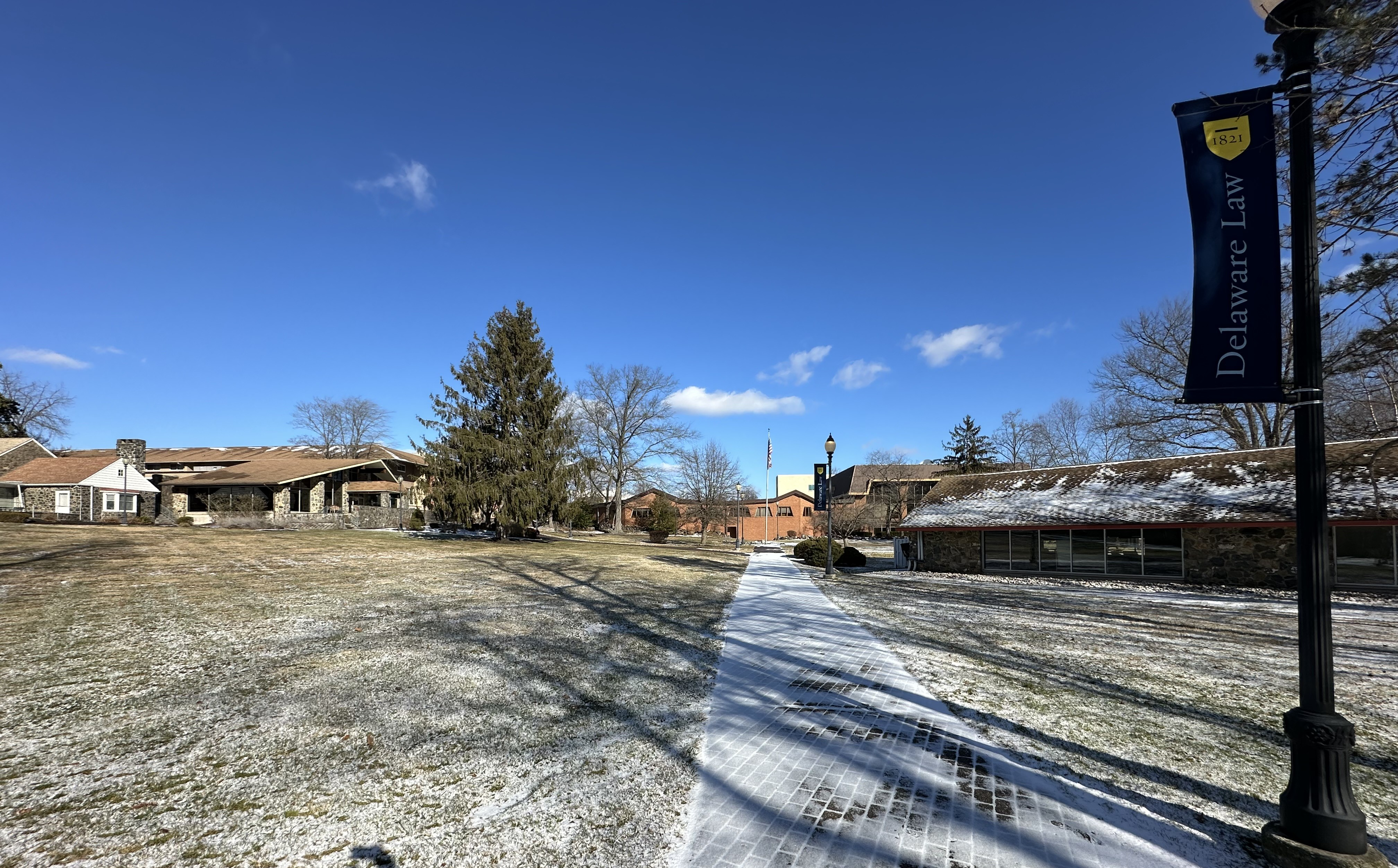
- Portion of the campus, with the main Law School building in the center
- Parent school: Widener University
- Established: 1971; 55 years ago
- School type: Private law school
- Parent endowment: $87,246,740
- Dean: Todd J. Clark
- Location: New Castle County, Delaware, United States
- Enrollment: 536 (full-time), 127 (part-time) (October 2023)
- Faculty: 33 (full-time), 56 (part-time)
- USNWR ranking: 175 (tied) (2024)
- Bar pass rate: 51.65% (2022 overall first-time takers); 64.79% (2023 PA first-time takers); 53.85% (2022 DE first-time takers)
- Website: delawarelaw.widener.edu

Widener University Delaware Law School (Delaware Law School and formerly Widener University School of Law) is a private law school in unincorporated New Castle County, Delaware, with a Wilmington post office address. It is one of two separate ABA-accredited law schools of Widener University. Widener University Law School was founded in 1971 as the Delaware Law School and became affiliated with Widener in 1975. In 1989, it was known as Widener University School of Law when it was combined with the campus in Harrisburg, Pennsylvania. In 2015, the two campuses separated, with the Harrisburg one renamed to Widener University Commonwealth Law School.

== History ==
Founded in 1971 as the Delaware Law School, the institution became affiliated with then Widener College. It became Widener University in 1975, and graduated its first class of 267 that August. The school's name was officially changed to Widener University School of Law in 1989 when the Harrisburg campus was added. On July 1, 2015, the two campuses were separated into two distinct law schools, Widener University Delaware Law School and Widener University Commonwealth Law School, which operate independently of each other, but remain part of the university. Each has its own dean, faculty, students, and curriculum.

== Campus ==
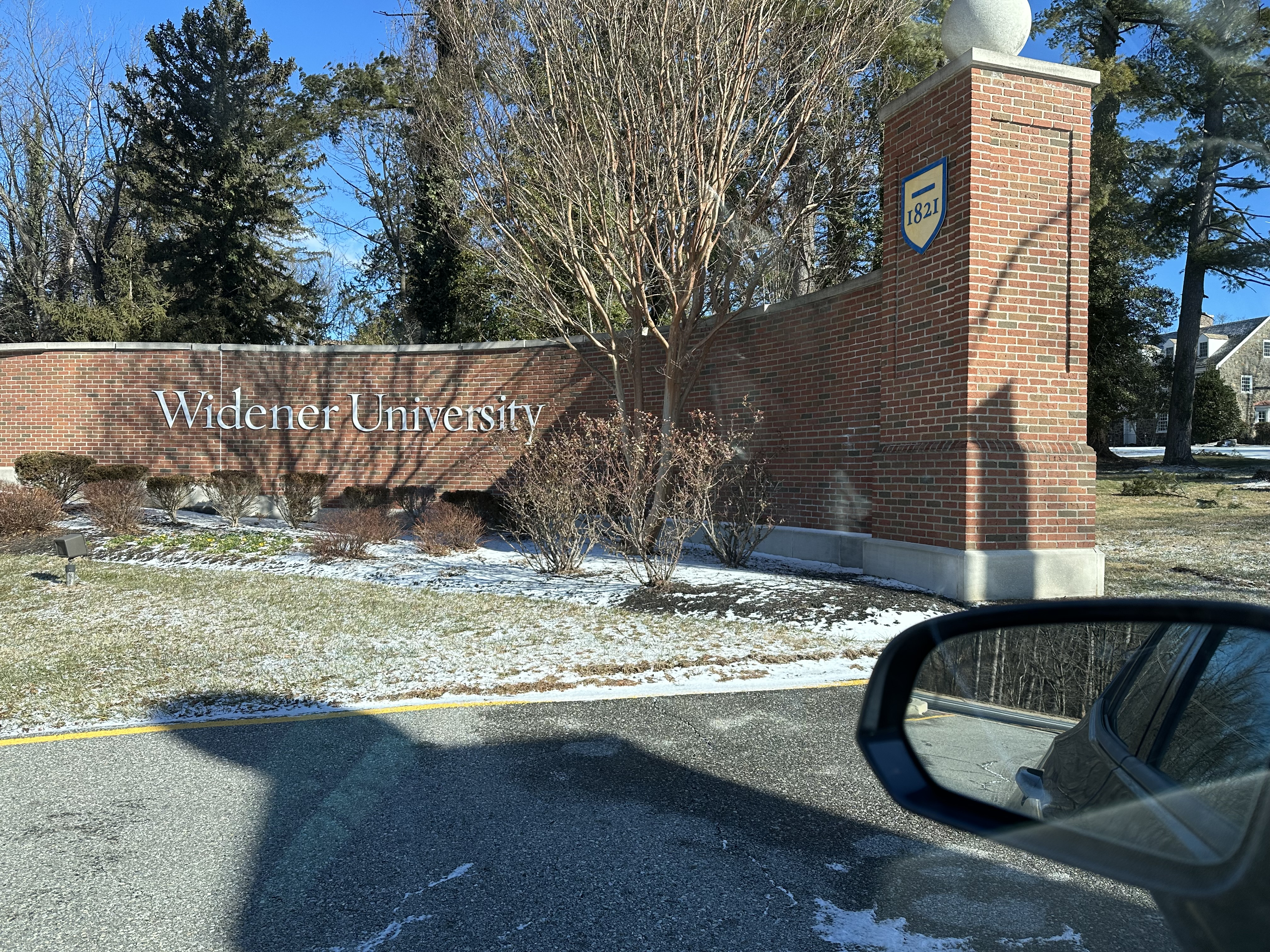
Entrance to the campus off U.S. 202 in New Castle County

Located in New Castle County, Delaware Law School's 40-acre (16 ha) campus is home to 686 students.

== Academics ==
Widener's legal education program includes legal clinics that specialize in environmental law, criminal defense, and civil law, which includes family law, and legal assistance on veterans' benefits cases. The Taishoff Advocacy, Technology and Public Service Institute offers an eight-day training program that teaches students how to conduct themselves properly in a courtroom trial.

Widener offers certification in specialized fields of study.

The campus offers a variety of pro-bono work or community outreach opportunities through the Public Interest Resource Center. Students also have the opportunity participate in extra and co-curricular activities such as Moot court, Moe Levine Trial Advocacy Honor Society, and two law reviews: the Delaware Journal of Corporate Law and the Widener Law Review.

=== Admissions ===
For the class entering in 2023, the school accepted 67.83% of applicants, with 32.52% of those accepted enrolling. The average enrollee had a 150 LSAT score and 3.26 undergraduate GPA.

=== Ranking ===
In the 2013 edition of the U.S. News & World Report "Best Law School Rankings", Widener was classified as a "fourth Tier" law school and the full-time JD program was not given a numerical value, as U.S. News then only ranked the Top 145, with the rest being unranked. For the 2022 rankings, Widener was ranked in the 147th–193rd ranking category (bottom 25%). For its 2024 rankings, U.S. News & World Report ranked Widener tied for #175 out of 196 ABA schools (bottom 10.71%) and in the #64-70 ranking category out of 70 part-time schools. In 2010, Widener University School of Law was named to a national list of "Top Green Schools" based on the strength of Widener's environmental law curriculum and the school's earth-friendly practices.

=== Study abroad ===
Study abroad is offered through the Summer International Law Institute. There are three institutes available to students: Kenya, Switzerland and Italy. While abroad, students may sometimes intern with international organizations.

== Post-graduation ==
=== Bar passage ===
In 2022, the overall bar pass rate for Widener Delaware first-time examination takers was 51.65%. The Ultimate Bar Pass Rate, which the ABA defines as the pass rate for graduates who sat for bar exams within two years of graduating, was 84.56% for the class of 2020.

== Costs ==
The total cost of attendance (indicating the cost of tuition, fees, and living expenses) at Widener for the 2023–2024 academic year was $81,484. The Law School Transparency estimated that debt-financed cost of attendance for three years was $280,753.

=== Employment statistics ===
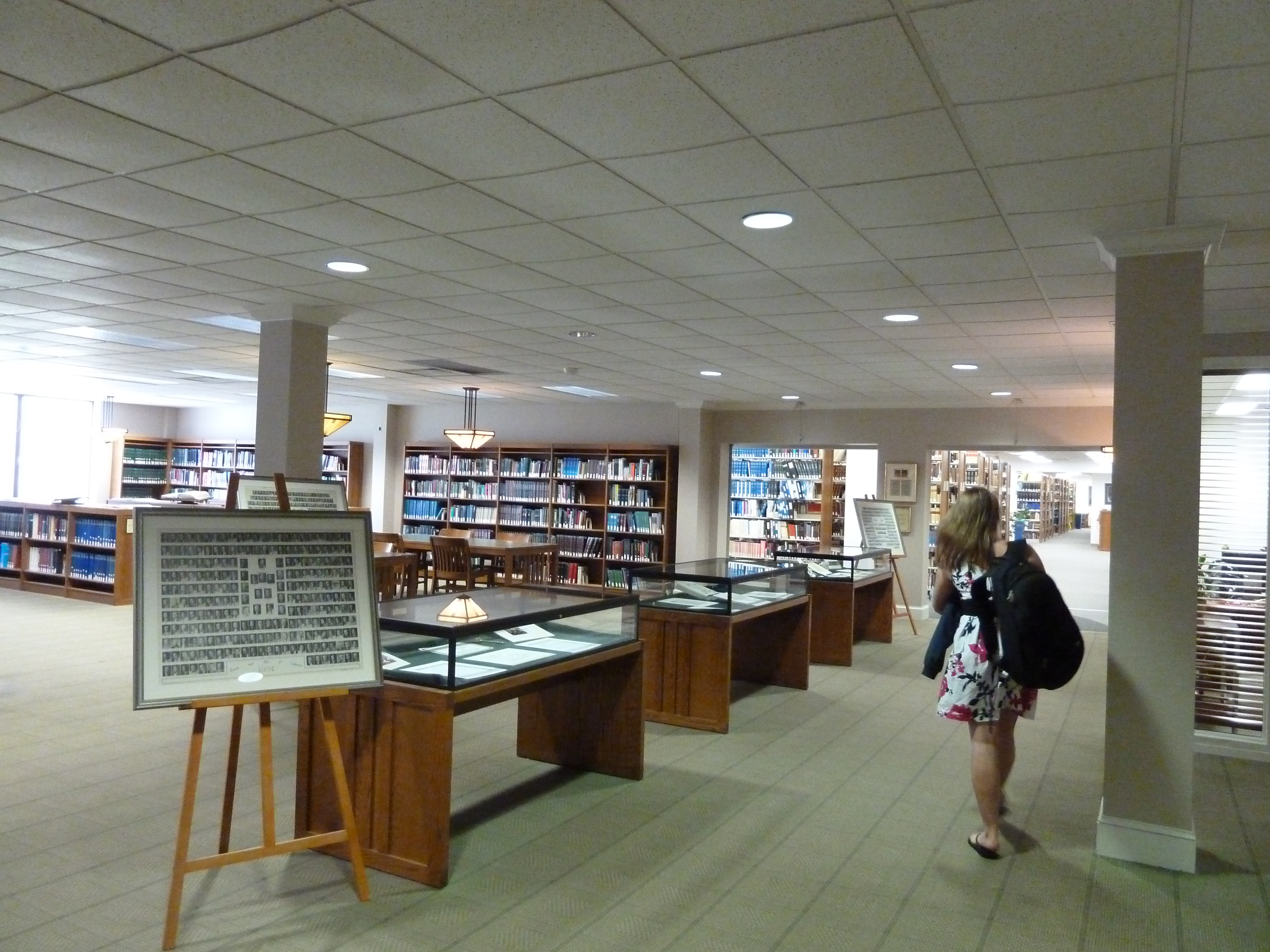
Interior of the Law Library

According to the law professor blog The Faculty Lounge, based on 2012 ABA data, 38.7% of graduates obtained full-time long term positions requiring bar admission (i.e., jobs as lawyers), nine months after graduation, ranking 177th out of 197 law schools.

According to Widener's official 2023 ABA-required disclosures, 63% of the Class of 2022 obtained full-time, long-term, JD-required employment nine months after graduation (i.e., jobs as lawyers). Widener's Law School Transparency under-employment score was 18.6%, indicating the percentage of the Class of 2022 unemployed, pursuing an additional degree, or working in a non-professional, short-term, or part-time job nine months after graduation.

=== Student loan debt ===
According to U.S. News & World Report, the average indebtedness of 2013 graduates who incurred law school debt was $130,180 (not including undergraduate debt), and 91% of 2013 graduates took on debt.

== Partnerships ==
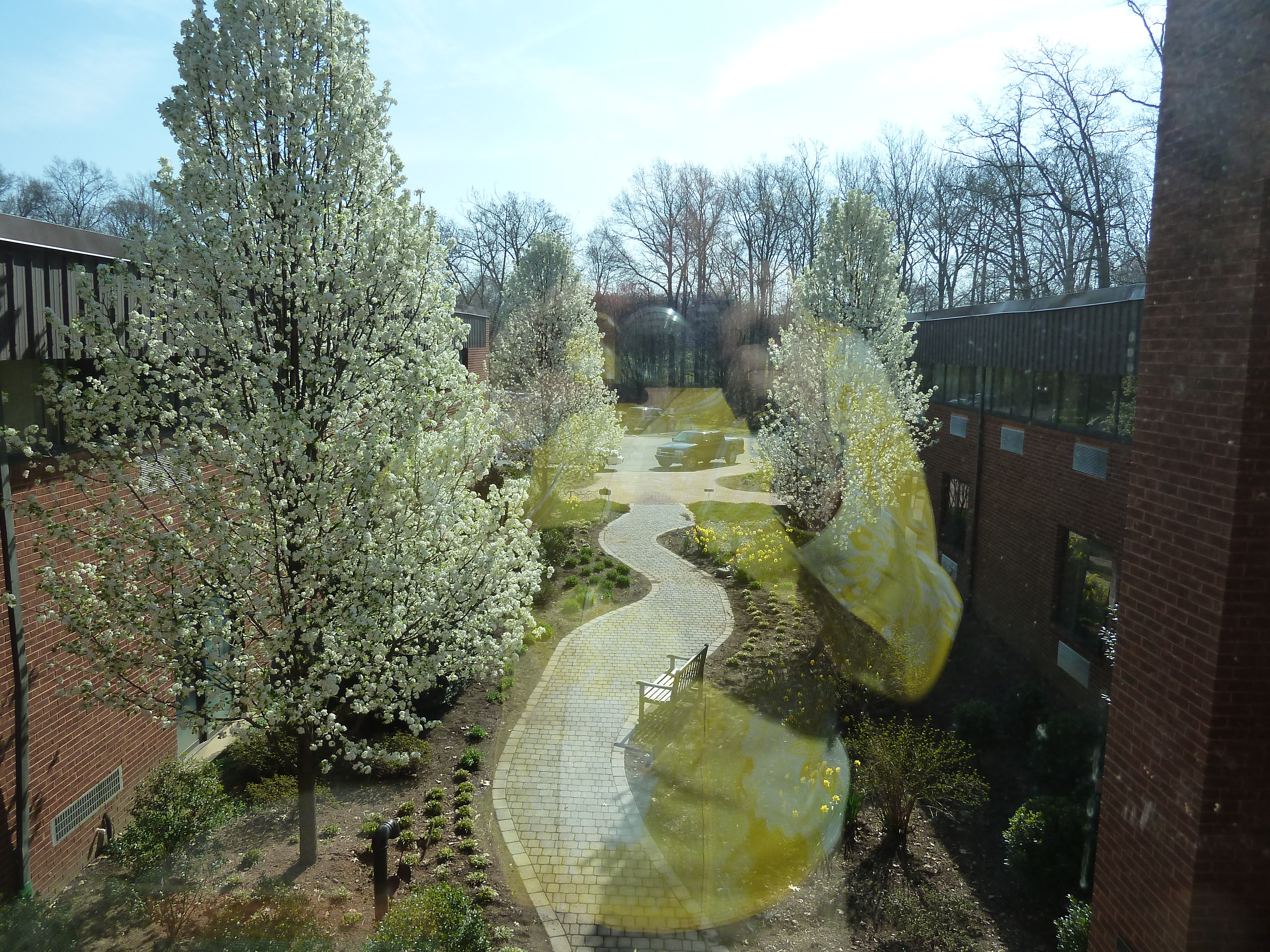
Springtime view of part of the campus

=== Undergraduate programs ===
Qualified undergraduate students at Widener University are eligible to apply to the law school under three special admissions programs.

- Express Admissions Program – Students in the top half of their class who score in the top 50th percentile on the LSAT are eligible to apply for express admission to the law school.
- 3+3 Fast Track Program – Government and politics students can earn their undergraduate degree and Juris Doctor degree in just six years.
- Legal Studies and Analysis Minor – This minor partners the undergraduate college with the law school to help prepare Widener students for the LSAT.

=== Stockton University ===
Beginning in 2009, Widener Law has offered an express admissions option to students and alumni from Stockton University.

- Express Admissions Program – Stockton students and graduates are eligible to apply for express admission to either campus.

== Notable faculty ==
- Joseph R. Biden Jr., adjunct professor who co-taught a seminar from 1991 through fall 2008, until he assumed the role of vice president of the United States

== Notable alumni ==
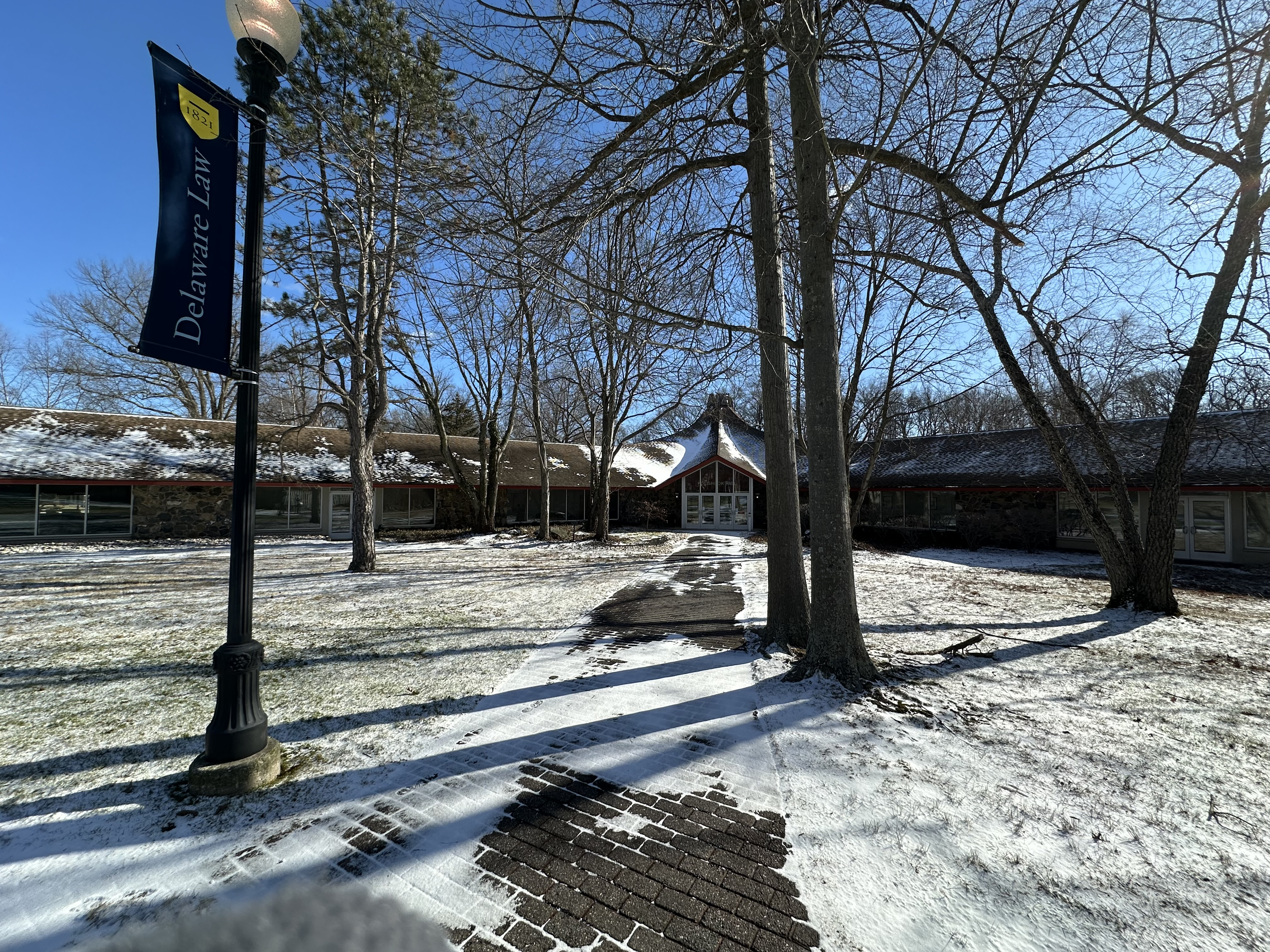
Polishook Hall, home of classrooms and the Legal Education Institute

- Dawn Marie Addiego, class of 1987, former New Jersey state senator (D)
- Peter J. Barnes III, class of 1985, former New Jersey assemblyman (D)
- David Brady, class of 1982, Delaware state representative (D) 1982–2002
- Bryan Cutler, class of 2006, former Pennsylvania speaker of the House (R)
- Carl Danberg, former Delaware attorney general (D)
- Madeleine Dean, class of 1984, U.S. congresswoman for Pennsylvania (D)
- Domenick DiCicco, former New Jersey assemblyman, 2010–2012 (R)
- Risa Vetri Ferman, class of 1990, judge, Court of Common Pleas for Montgomery County, Pennsylvania; former district attorney
- Jon D. Fox, class of 1975, former U.S. congressman (R-PA)
- Tom Gannon, class of 1976, former member Pennsylvania House of Representatives, 1979–2006
- Stephanie Hansen, class of 2000, Delaware state senator
- Tom Houghton, class of 1995, former Pennsylvania assemblyman, 2009–2010
- Mark S. McNaughton, politician
- Mike Missanelli, class of 1986, Philadelphia sports radio personality
- Pat Quinn, class of 1983, Canadian-born former NHL coach and general manager
- Curt Schroder, class of 1989, former Pennsylvania assemblyman (R)
- Lee Solomon, class of 1978, associate justice, New Jersey Supreme Court
- Todd Stephens, class of 2000, former Pennsylvania assemblyman (R)
- Brian Tierney, class of 1987, former publisher of The Philadelphia Inquirer and Philadelphia Daily News
- Gary Traynor, class of 1983, Delaware Supreme Court justice
- Terry Van Horne, class of 1993, former Pennsylvania assemblyman (D)
