= Stephanie Hansen =

Delaware state senator elected in 2017 special election

Member of the Delaware Senate from the 10th district
- Incumbent
- Assumed office February 2017
- Preceded by: Bethany Hall-Long

President of the New Castle County Council
- In office November 12, 1996 – January 1, 2001
- Preceded by: Theodore W. Ryan
- Succeeded by: Chris Coons

Personal details
- Born: July 24, 1961 (age 65) Limestone, Maine, U.S.
- Party: Democratic
- Spouse: David Marturana
- Education: University of Delaware; University of New Orleans; Widener University School of Law
- Profession: Environmental lawyer
- Website: Official website

Stephanie Leigh Hansen (born July 24, 1961) is an American politician. She is a Democratic member of the Delaware Senate, representing District 10. She was elected in 2017 after winning a special election to fill the seat of Bethany Hall-Long, who had resigned to take office as the state's lieutenant governor. Prior to being elected to the state senate, Hansen served as president of the New Castle County Council.

== Early life ==
Hansen was born at Loring Air Force Base in 1961 while her father was serving in the U.S. Air Force. In 1963, her family moved from the Eastern Shore to Seaford when her father was employed by the DuPont company. She graduated from Seaford Senior High School in 1979. She later attended the University of Delaware and earned a BS in geology. After graduating, she earned a MS in earth science from the University of New Orleans.

== Career ==
Starting in 1988, Hansen worked as an environmental scientist and hydrologist for the state Department of Natural Resources and Environmental Control (DNREC). She worked in the agency's Superfund and underground storage tank branches.

In 1996, she was elected president of New Castle County Council, the only at-large position on the council, after successfully challenging incumbent Theodore Ryan for the Democratic nomination in the September primary election. During her tenure she helped shape the county's land use code.

While on the county council, Hansen began to transition her career from science to environmental law by taking classes at Widener University School of Law, eventually graduating cum laude. She decided to not seek reelection in 2000, and was succeeded by Chris Coons. She remained politically active as the chair of her local Democratic committee. After her admission to the Delaware bar, she practiced environmental law at the firm of Richards, Layton & Finger for four years. Hansen left Richards Layton in 2005 for Young Conaway Stargatt & Taylor in Wilmington. At Young Conaway, she has specialized in legal matters concerning environmentally-degraded properties and has represented local governments on federal Civil Rights Act and Fair Housing Act issues.

== 2017 Delaware Senate special election ==
After Bethany Hall-Long was sworn in as Lieutenant Governor on January 17, 2017, she resigned from her seat in the Senate. Governor John Carney announced a special election to fill her vacancy to be held on February 25. In anticipation of Hall-Long's resignation, Democrats from the local 10th district committee had selected Hansen as their nominee in December.

The election had more significance than the average state senate race and received national attention. At the time, the 21-member Delaware Senate was split evenly between 10 Democrats and 10 Republicans. While Democrats remained in control with the tie-breaking vote of Lieutenant Governor Hall-Long as senate president, a Republican victory would have given Republicans control of the chamber for the first time in over four decades, ending the complete Democratic control of the General Assembly.

On a national level, the race was one of the first since Donald Trump took office and was described as important in showing the strength of Democrats in "a traditional stronghold like Delaware." The race received a large amount of national attention for an off-year state election race, and Democrats were poised to spend a "record-shattering" $1 million. Hansen's campaign itself raised more than $300,000 over the course of three weeks—six times that of her opponent—with money from across the country, including over 14,000 donations under $100.

Former Vice President Joe Biden took a visible role in the campaign by fundraising, appearing in ads, and even going door-to-door with Hansen. Other prominent volunteers included Carney and former Maryland governor and 2016 Democratic presidential candidate Martin O'Malley. Hansen was also endorsed by the Delaware State AFL–CIO, the Delaware Building Trades, Delaware United, the Delaware State Education Association, the District Council of Delaware Laborers, Mary Ann's List, and the Barbara Gittings Delaware Stonewall Democrats. Her campaign focused on a multitude of issues including the cost of living for seniors, the opioid addiction epidemic, and affordable college education. Her campaign manager, Erik Schramm, emphasized the effort to "highlight local issues while harnessing the national mood to excite volunteers." As Hansen said that many of the voters she met while going door-to-door were watching television coverage of the protests against the new administration when she came to their homes.

While special elections usually see lower voter participation, the turnout on election day was over 35%, higher than the 2014 midterm election. Hansen won with 7,315 votes (58%) against Republican nominee John Marino and Libertarian nominee Joseph Lanzendorfer. Democrats nationwide celebrated the victory as a big win for a new generation of activists after the election of Trump as president.

== Legislation ==
Hansen is known for her work in energy and environmental policy. In 2021, she sponsored legislation to extend and expand Delaware's Renewable Portfolio Standards to increase the state's investment in renewable energy sources. She has introduced legislation to conserve native species and prevent the importation of invasive species.

== Electoral history ==
2017: Hansen won the Special Election held on February 25, 2017, with 7,315 votes (58.14%), defeating Republican candidate John Marino and Libertarian candidate Joseph D. Lanzendorfer.

2018: Hansen defeated Republican nominee Christine Metzing with 11,665 votes (62.06%) in the general election held on November 6, 2018.

2022: Hansen was unopposed in the general election held on November 8, 2022.

2024: Hansen was unopposed in the general election held on November 5, 2024.
