= LaShonda =

LaShonda or Lashonda is a feminine given name. Notable people with the name include:

- LaShonda K. Barnett (born 1974), American author, playwright, and radio host
- LaShonda A. Hunt (born 1970), American judge
- Lashonda Lester (1975/1976–2017), American standup comedian
