= Kay Kirkpatrick =

American politician

Member of the Georgia State Senate from the 32nd district
- Incumbent
- Assumed office June 2, 2017
- Preceded by: Judson Hill

Personal details
- Born: September 13, 1954 (age 72) United States
- Party: Republican
- Spouse: Thomas
- Children: 2
- Education: University of Kentucky; University of Louisville School of Medicine
- Profession: Surgeon, Politician
- Website: kayforsenate.com

Kay Kirkpatrick (September 13, 1954) is an American politician who is a member of the Georgia State Senate for the 32nd district, a district which includes portions of Cobb and Fulton counties. She is a member of the Republican Party.

Kirkpatrick graduated from the University of Kentucky and the University of Louisville School of Medicine. She worked as an orthopedic surgeon.

On May 16, 2017, Kirkpatrick won a special election to succeed longtime state Sen. Judson Hill, R-Marietta, who had held the seat since 2005 and resigned to run for Congress. Kirkpatrick's margin of victory in the general election was 57–43. She was sworn into office on June 2, 2017.

On March 20, 2020, Kirkpatrick announced she had tested positive for COVID-19, and said she was recovering without complications.
