= 2016 Delaware lieutenant gubernatorial election =

2016 Delaware Lieutenant gubernatorial election
- November 8, 2016
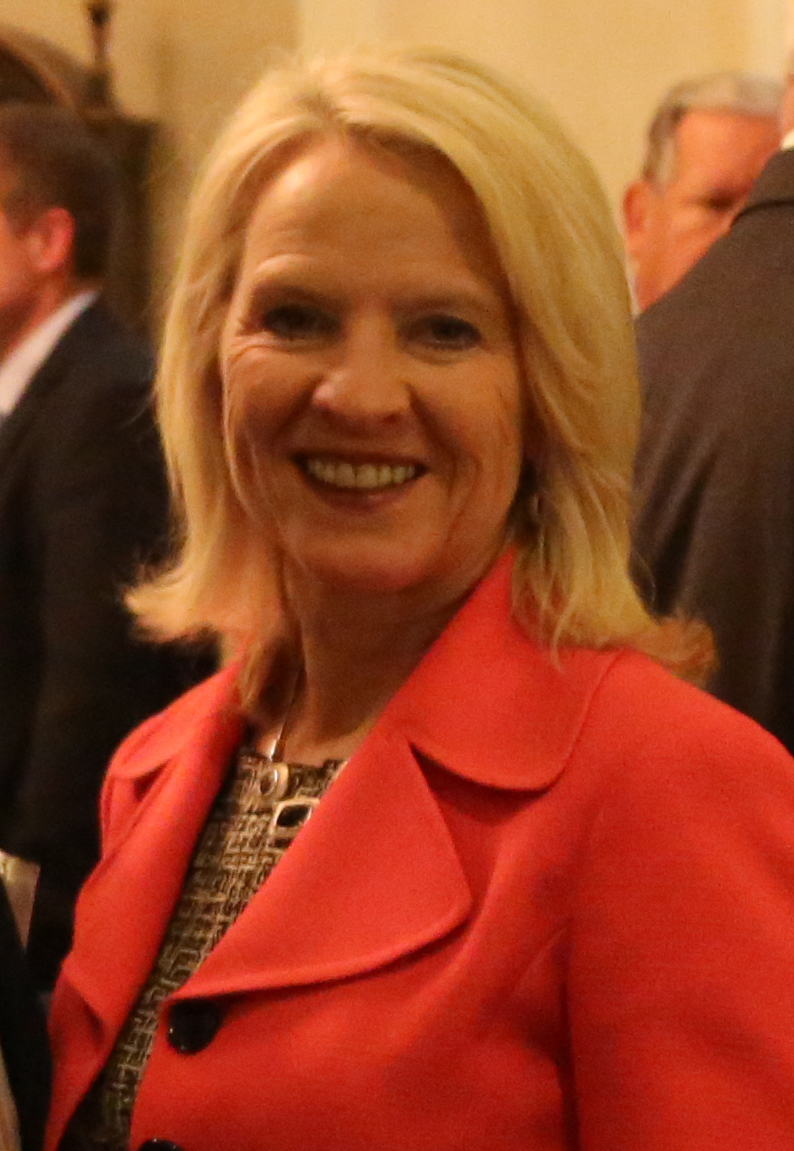

| Nominee | Bethany Hall-Long | La Mar Gunn |
| Party | Democratic | Republican |
| Popular vote | 248,141 | 169,291 |
| Percentage | 59.44% | 40.56% |
- Hall-Long: 50–60% 60–70% 70–80% 80–90% >90% Gunn: 50–60% 60–70% No votes
Lieutenant Governor before election
Vacant
Elected Lieutenant Governor
Bethany Hall-Long
Democratic

The 2016 Delaware lieutenant gubernatorial election was held on November 8, 2016, coinciding with the Delaware gubernatorial election. The office had been vacant since former Democratic lieutenant governor Matthew Denn was inaugurated as attorney general on January 6, 2015.

== Democratic primary ==
=== Candidates ===
==== Declared ====
- Sherry Dorsey Walker, Wilmington City Councilwoman and candidate for the State Senate in 2014
- Brad Eaby, Kent County Levy Court Commissioner
- Greg Fuller, former Sussex County Register of Wills
- Bethany Hall-Long, state senator
- Kathy McGuiness, Rehoboth Beach Commissioner
- Ciro Poppiti, New Castle County Register of Wills

==== Declined ====
- Chris Bullock, president of the New Castle County Council
- Peter Schwartzkopf, Speaker of the Delaware House of Representatives

=== Results ===
Democratic primary results
| Party | Candidate | Votes | % |
|---|---|---|---|
| Democratic | Bethany Hall-Long | 18,326 | 29.1 |
| Democratic | Sherry Dorsey Walker | 13,748 | 21.8 |
| Democratic | Kathy McGuiness | 10,860 | 17.24 |
| Democratic | Ciro Poppiti III | 10,835 | 17.21 |
| Democratic | Greg Fuller | 5,701 | 9.0 |
| Democratic | Bradley Eaby | 3,522 | 5.6 |
| Total votes | | 62,992 | 100% |

== Republican primary ==
State Senator Colin Bonini had announced that he was running for governor in November 2014, but reportedly was considering switching to run for lieutenant governor. Bonini announced on November 23, 2015, that he would remain in the race for governor.

=== Candidates ===
==== Declared ====
- La Mar Gunn, president of the NAACP of Central Delaware and nominee for Kent County Recorder of Deeds in 2014

==== Declined ====
- Colin Bonini, state senator and nominee for state treasurer in 2010 (running for governor)

== Results ==
2016 Delaware lieutenant gubernatorial election
| Party | Candidate | Votes | % | ±% |
|---|---|---|---|---|
| Democratic | Bethany Hall-Long | 248,141 | 59.44% | −2.12% |
| Republican | La Mar T. Gunn | 169,291 | 40.56% | +3.45% |
| Total votes | | 417,432 | 100.00% | N/A |
| Democratic hold | | | | |

== See also ==
- Delaware gubernatorial election, 2016
