= Judson Hill =

American politician

Member of the Georgia Senate from the 32nd district
- In office January 10, 2005 – February 13, 2017
- Preceded by: Charles B. Tanksley
- Succeeded by: Kay Kirkpatrick

Personal details
- Born: December 17, 1959 (age 66) United States
- Party: Republican
- Spouse: Shelly Hill
- Education: Emory University
- Profession: Politician
- Website: www.judsonhill.com

Judson Hill (born December 17, 1959) is an American politician. He is a former member of the Georgia State Senate from the 32nd district, elected in 2004 and re-elected six times, serving from 2005 until 2017. He is a member of the Republican Party.

On November 30, 2016, Hill announced that he would run for the United States House of Representatives in Georgia's 6th congressional district special election, 2017, to succeed Tom Price. Hill resigned from the Georgia Senate upon qualifying on February 13, for the special election held on April 18, 2017. In the Georgia Senate Senator Hill served as Chairman of the Senate Finance Committee, Vice Chairman of the Senate Republican Caucus and Deputy Senate Majority Whip. He gained a reputation as a hard working conservative leader committed to understanding the issues and voting true to his district. In 2014, Senator Hill was named “Legislator of the Year” by James magazine as well as national “Legislator of the Year” for the American Legislative Exchange Council in 2015. He was a recognized national leader of conservative tax reform and free market healthcare solutions. Senator Hill served in the Reagan Administration as an Assistant United States Attorney for the Northern District of Georgia, and also in Washington, D.C. as an appointee at the United States Department of State. Prior to that, Senator Hill worked for President Reagan on the White House Advance Team and on the Reagan-Bush ’84 campaign.
