= States Win =

American political organization

States Win (formerly known as Sister District Project) is a left-of-center political organization that helps elect Democrats to state legislative seats across the United States. The organization leverages the efforts of volunteers from safe ("sister") districts in other states to campaign for Democrats who are attempting to win or hold seats in competitive districts. Among the activities volunteers engage in are phone banking, postcard writing, on-site canvassing, and fundraising for selected candidates. States Win includes 527 and a PAC funding mechanisms as well as facilitating direct contributions to selected campaigns and organizations.

== History ==
States Win is a woman-led operation founded by Rita Bosworth, Gaby Goldstein, Candis Mitchell, Lyzz Schwegler, and Lala Wu following the 2016 United States presidential election. In 2017, States Win (known then as Sister District) reported raising over $350,000 in small-dollar donations.

== Political action ==
Bosworth argued more Democratic statehouses would reduce partisan gerrymandering.

Building on Tea Party movement tactics such as field organizing, identifying likely supporters, and tracking door knocking, progressive movements like Indivisible, Swing Left, and Sister District Project brought new energy to progressive grassroots organizing.

Sister District helped flip the Virginia House and Senate to Democratic control.
