= Bethany Hall-Long =

American politician (born 1963)

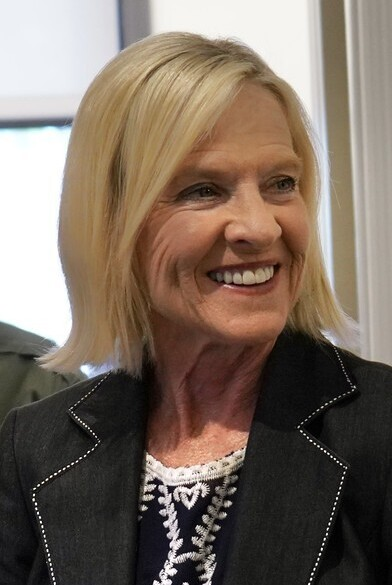
- Hall-Long in 2024

75th Governor of Delaware
- In office January 7, 2025 – January 21, 2025
- Lieutenant: Vacant
- Preceded by: John Carney
- Succeeded by: Matt Meyer

26th Lieutenant Governor of Delaware
- In office January 17, 2017 – January 7, 2025
- Governor: John Carney
- Preceded by: Matthew Denn (2015)
- Succeeded by: Kyle Evans Gay

61st Chair of the National Lieutenant Governors Association
- In office 2020–2021
- Preceded by: Billy Nungesser
- Succeeded by: Mike Foley

Member of the Delaware Senate from the 10th district
- In office November 5, 2008 – November 9, 2016
- Preceded by: Steven H. Amick
- Succeeded by: Stephanie Hansen

Member of the Delaware House of Representatives from the 8th district
- In office November 6, 2002 – November 5, 2008
- Preceded by: David Brady
- Succeeded by: S. Quinton Johnson

Personal details
- Born: November 12, 1963 (age 63) Sussex County, Delaware, U.S.
- Party: Democratic
- Spouse: Dana Armon Long
- Education: Thomas Jefferson University (BSN); Medical University of South Carolina (MSN); George Mason University (PhD)
- Website: Official website

Bethany A. Hall-Long (born November 12, 1963) is an American politician who served as the 75th governor of Delaware for two weeks in January 2025, after having served as the 26th lieutenant governor of Delaware from 2017 to 2025. A member of the Democratic Party, she previously served in the Delaware Senate from 2008 to 2016 and the Delaware House of Representatives from 2002 to 2008. During her time in Delaware's General Assembly, Hall-Long sponsored more than 1,000 bills, 60% of which were health care related.

She ran for governor in the 2024 Democratic primary election and was defeated by Matt Meyer. She assumed the governorship when John Carney resigned to become mayor of Wilmington and completed the remaining two weeks of Carney's term in January 2025. She is the second female governor of Delaware and the first nurse to serve as governor in any of the 50 US states.

== Early life and education ==
Hall-Long was born on November 12, 1963, in Sussex County. She is a descendant of David Hall, the 15th governor of Delaware. She was raised on a farm with her two older brothers and attended Indian River High School. She earned a BSN from Thomas Jefferson University, an MSN from the Medical University of South Carolina, and a PhD in health policy and nursing administration from George Mason University.

== Nursing career ==
Hall-Long has been a nurse for over 35 years. She began her teaching career at George Mason University and then the University of Delaware where she is a Professor Emeritus of Nursing and Joint Faculty in Urban Affairs. She holds a distinguished record at the University of Delaware, where she became the first nursing faculty to receive the University-wide Excellence in Teaching award.

During her tenure at the University of Delaware, she secured over $70 million in funding for public health projects and research grants. Her research and community service record with at-risk groups such as pregnant teens, diabetics, the homeless, and the mentally ill, make her a nationally recognized health scientist.

Hall-Long has received the Nell J. Watts Lifetime Achievement in Nursing Award from the Sigma Theta Tau International Honor Society of Nursing, and the distinguished alumni award from the Medical University of South Carolina.

== Lieutenant Governor of Delaware ==
=== Election ===
Hall-Long was elected Lieutenant Governor of Delaware in 2016, winning a six-way primary election, and defeating Republican La Mar Gunn in the general election, receiving nearly 60% of the vote. Hall-Long took office as Delaware's 26th Lieutenant Governor on January 17, 2017.

=== Tenure ===
==== Behavioral health ====
As Lt. Governor, Hall-Long helped create Delaware's first Behavioral Health Consortium in June 2017, which she chaired. The consortium's role is to develop short-term and long-term plans to address addiction and mental health issues in Delaware. In 2018, Pew Charitable Trusts partnered with the Consortium to help increase access to opioid treatment.

Through her work on the Behavioral Health Consortium, Hall-Long spearheaded legislation that created the first overdose system of care in the United States. The legislation was signed into law by Governor Carney in 2018. Hall-Long also led a pilot program in Delaware to launch the nation's first combined xylazine and fentanyl testing strips, a harm reduction tool aimed at curbing the opioid epidemic.

In June 2022 Hall-Long worked with state senator Sarah McBride and state representative Melissa Minor-Brown to secure $3.2 million in funding from the Delaware Department of Health and Social Services for the first in-patient addiction treatment facility for pregnant and parenting women in Delaware.

Along with Attorney General Kathy Jennings, Hall-Long co-chaired Delaware's Prescription Opioid Settlement Distribution Commission. The Commission is tasked with recommending where more than $250 million in settlement funding from pharmaceutical companies should be allocated across the state to aid in addiction treatment and resources.

Throughout her tenure, Hall-Long worked to improve mental health resources for veterans. In 2022, Hall-Long became co-chair of the Delaware Governor's Challenge alongside former Delaware Adjutant General Francis Vavala. The Governor's Challenge is part of a nationwide effort to facilitate community and state-level strategies to prevent veteran suicide. Additionally, Hall-Long and the Behavioral Health Consortium helped propose legislation that created a Green Alert system in Delaware for at-risk missing veterans, similar to a Gold Alert. The legislation was signed in 2018.

==== Board of Pardons ====
As part of her role as Lt. Governor, Hall-Long served as Chair of Delaware's Board of Pardons, where she led significant reforms to modernize the board's operations. Under her leadership, wait times were reduced and outdated procedures were streamlined, resulting in more Delawareans receiving pardons and commutations than at any point in the past 30 years. During her tenure, pardon hearings increased by over 12%, and commutation hearings rose by more than 90%, offering more individuals a meaningful opportunity for a second chance.

==== Disaster response efforts ====
During the height of the COVID-19 pandemic, Hall-Long helped lead the states COVID response efforts. In 2020, she was asked by Governor Carney to co-chair the state's Pandemic Resurgence Advisory Committee (PRAC) along with Secretary of State Jeffrey Bullock. Composed of over 50 Delaware leaders in both the private and public sectors, the PRAC was tasked with preparing a pandemic playbook that included a strategy focused to develop new public health strategies, identify critical resources, and assess methods to protect vulnerable populations.

In 2023, in response to the nationwide infant formula shortage, Hall-Long worked with public, private and non-profit organizations to lead efforts to increase the distribution of infant formula to high-needs areas across Delaware. The initiative helped distribute over 44,000 canisters of infant formula to Delaware families in need.

Hall-Long served as a principal investigator of the Delaware Medical Reserve Corps (DMRC), where she helped lead the state's response to public health emergencies.

==== STEM initiatives ====
As a research scientist and Lt. Governor, Hall-Long spent much of her tenure working to close education and opportunity gaps in the STEM field. Notably, she serves as national co-chair of Million Women Mentors, an organization championing women and girls in STEM.

==== Other initiatives ====
In 2018, Hall-Long was appointed by Governor John Carney to Chair the Governor's Complete Count Commission, which led Delaware's 2020 U.S. Census efforts. The commission found that between 2010 and 2020 the state's population grew by more than 10%, the highest growth rate in the northeast.

Hall-Long also led the effort to establish basic needs closets in 43 Delaware schools. The initiative helps elementary and middle school students with free products like hygiene products, school supplies, clothes and more.

In 2023, Hall-Long partnered with the Delaware Art's Alliance to develop a strategic plan to grow Delaware's Creative Economy and grow cultural tourism across the state.

She served as Chair of the National Lieutenant Governor's Association from 2020 to 2021.

=== Reelection ===
Hall-Long was reelected in 2020 over Republican Donyale Hall.

== Governor of Delaware ==
=== 2024 gubernatorial election ===
In April 2024, Hall-Long announced her candidacy for governor of Delaware, joining New Castle County Executive Matt Meyer and former Delaware Department of Natural Resources and Environmental Control Secretary Collin O’Mara in the Democratic primary race. She faced scrutiny when she publicly disclosed campaign accounting and reporting errors dating back several years. She amended seven years of campaign finance reports to correct the issue. Meyer ultimately won the primary and went on to win the general election. Hall-Long received roughly 37% of the vote in the Democratic primary, falling behind Meyer's 47% and placing ahead of O'Mara's 16%. She carried Kent County with 51% of the vote, losing New Castle and Sussex counties to Meyer.

=== Tenure ===
Hall-Long became the 75th governor of Delaware on January 7, 2025, when incumbent Governor John Carney resigned early to become mayor of Wilmington. Hall-Long became the second female governor of Delaware. She served the remaining two weeks of Carney's term and was succeeded by Meyer.

==== Executive Orders ====
During her tenure as governor, Hall-Long signed executive orders that created Delaware's first ever LGBTQ+ Commission, Delaware's Foster Care Ambassador Program, and an artificial intelligence driven application to address food insecurity and food waste.

== Personal life ==
Hall-Long met her husband, Dana Long, while in high school, and they married in 1987. Dana served in the U.S. Navy from 1982 to 1991 as a data systems technician. They currently reside in Middletown and have a son, Brock.

== Electoral history ==
- In 2000, Hall-Long initially challenged incumbent Republican Representative Richard C. Cathcart for the District 9 seat, but lost in the general election.
- In 2002, Hall-Long was redistricted to District 8 and won the general election with 3,591 votes (60.7%) against Republican nominee William Hutchinson.
- In 2004, Hall-Long won the general election unopposed with 8,228 votes.
- In 2006, Hall-Long won the general election with 5,864 votes (77.0%) against Republican nominee Edward Colaprete.
- In 2008, Republican Senator Steven H. Amick retired and left the District 10 seat open. Hall-Long won the general election with 13,965 votes (64.9%) against Republican nominee James Weldin for the senate seat.
- In 2012, Hall-Long won the general election unopposed with 16,498 votes.

== See also ==
- List of female governors in the United States
- List of female lieutenant governors in the United States

Political offices
Vacant Title last held by Matthew Denn; 2015	Lieutenant Governor of Delaware; 2017–2025	Succeeded by Kyle Evans Gay
Preceded by John Carney	Governor of Delaware; 2025	Succeeded by Matt Meyer
U.S. order of precedence (ceremonial)
Preceded by John Carney as Former Governor	Order of precedence of the United States	Succeeded by Mark Schweiker as Former Governor
