= 2010 United States Senate elections =

- November 2, 2010 (Note: A special election was held in Massachusetts on January 19, 2010.)
- Class 3

37 (Note: 34 Class 3 seats including both the concurrent special and regular elections in Illinois, as well as 2 Class 1 seats and 1 Class 2 seat in special election. Does not count the Massachusetts special election.) of the 100 seats in the United States Senate 51 seats needed for a majority
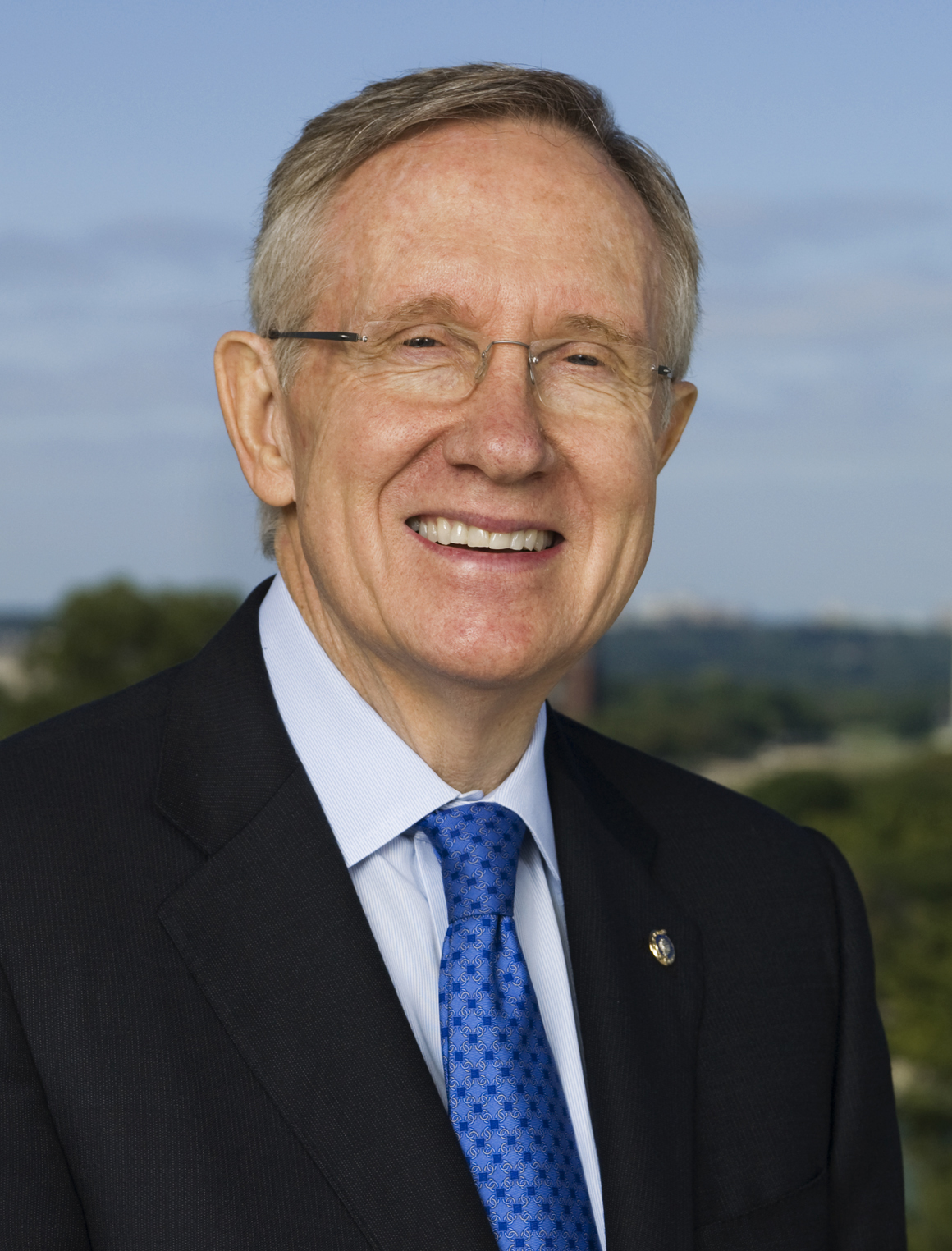

	Majority party	Minority party
Leader	Harry Reid	Mitch McConnell
Party	Democratic	Republican
Leader's seat	Nevada	Kentucky
Seats before	57	41
Seats after	51	47
Seat change	▼6	▲6
Popular vote	29,110,733	32,680,704
Percentage	43.98%	49.37%
Seats up	19	18
Races won	13	24
	Third party
Party	Independent
Seats before	2 (Note: Although Lieberman was elected as "Connecticut for Lieberman", most sources (including himself) refer to him as an "Independent Democrat" and he is included here as an independent.)
Seats after	2 (Note: Both Independent senators Joe Lieberman and Bernie Sanders joined with the Democrats in their caucus.)
Seat change	Steady
Popular vote	147,645
Percentage	0.22%
Seats up	0
Races won	0
- Results of the elections: (excl. Massachusetts); Democratic hold Republican hold Republican gain No election Rectangular inset (N.Y.): both seats up for election
Majority Leader before election
Harry Reid
Democratic
Elected Majority Leader
Harry Reid
Democratic

The 2010 United States Senate elections were held on November 2, 2010, from among the United States Senate's 100 seats. A special election was held on January 19, 2010, for a midterm vacancy in Massachusetts. 34 of the November elections were for 6-year terms to the Senate's Class 3, while other 3 were special elections to finish incomplete terms. Those 37 November elections featured 19 incumbent Democrats (7 of whom retired or were defeated in the primary) and 18 incumbent Republicans (8 of whom retired or were defeated in the primary).

After the 2008 elections, the Senate was composed of 58 Democrats, 40 Republicans, and 2 independents who caucused with the Democrats. However, in a January 2010 special election, Republicans picked up a seat in Massachusetts thereby reducing Democrats' majority to 57 seats.

Republicans won 4 seats held by retiring Democrats and also defeated 2 incumbent Democrats, for a Republican net gain of 6 seats. This was the first time since 1994 that Republicans successfully defended all of their own seats. This was also the fourth consecutive election of Class 3 senators where Democrats failed to gain seats. Despite the Republican gains, the Democrats retained a majority of the Senate with 51 seats plus the 2 Independents who caucused with them, compared to the 47 Republican seats. As of 2025, this was the last time Republicans won U.S. Senate seats in Illinois and New Hampshire.

== Results summary ==
↓
51	2	47

Democratic	Independent	Republican

Shading indicates party with largest share of that line. Does not include the January 2010 special election in Massachusetts.

Parties									Total
Parties		Democratic	Republican	Independent	Libertarian	Green	Constitution	Others	Total
Last elections (2008) Before the November elections		57	41	2	—	—	—	—	100
Not Up	Total	38	23	2	—	—	—	—	63
Not Up	Class 1 (2006→2012)	19	10	2	—	—	—	—	31
Not Up	Class 2 (2008→2014)	19	13	—	—	—	—	—	32
Up	Total	19	18	—	—	—	—	—	37
Up	Class 1	2	—	—	—	—	—	—	2
Up	Class 2	1	—	—	—	—	—	—	1
Up	Class 3	16	18	—	—	—	—	—	34
Incumbent retired	Total before	6 (Note: Interim appointee Roland Burris of Illinois did not seek election to finish the unexpired term and did not seek election to a full term and interim appointees Ted Kaufman and Carte Goodwin did not seek election to finish the unexpired term.)	6	—	—	—	—	—	12
Incumbent retired	Held by same party	3	6	—	—	—	—	—	9
Incumbent retired	Replaced by other party	▼3 Democrats replaced by ▲3 Republicans		—	—	—	—	—	3
Incumbent retired	Result after	3	9	—	—	—	—	—	12
Incumbent ran	Total before	13 (Note: Includes two incumbent appointees who won elections to finish their term or to the next full term.) (Note: In Pennsylvania, Arlen Specter lost renomination for another term and Joe Sestak became the party's new nominee.)	12 (Note: In Alaska, Lisa Murkowski lost renomination for another term in office and Joe Miller became the party's new nominee, but Murkowski later re-ran as a write-in candidate. In Utah, Bob Bennett lost renomination for another term and Mike Lee became the party's new nominee.)	—	—	—	—	—	25
Incumbent ran	Won election	10	10	—	—	—	—	—	20
Incumbent ran	Lost re-election	▼2 Democrats replaced by ▲2 Republicans		—	—	—	—	—	2
Incumbent ran	Lost renomination but won re-election	—	1	—	—	—	—	—	1
Incumbent ran	Lost renomination but party held	—	1	—	—	—	—	—	1
Incumbent ran	Lost renomination and party lost	▼1 Democrat replaced by ▲1 Republican		—	—	—	—	—	1
Incumbent ran	Result after	10	15	—	—	—	—	—	25
Total elected		13	24	—	—	—	—	—	37
Net gain/loss		▼6	▲6	—	—	—	—	—	6
Nationwide vote	Votes	32,405,787	34,616,463	155,846 (Note: The Clerk of the U.S. House of Representatives lists Crist as "No Party Affiliation" in her report and, in the national total, classifies his more than 1.6 million votes under "Other (Scattering, Write-ins, etc.)".)	776,327	552,006	178,860	3,100,833	71,786,122
Nationwide vote	Share	45.14%	48.22%	0.22%	1.08%	0.77%	0.25%	4.32%	100%
Result		51	47	2	—	—	—	—	100
End of this Congress		56	42	2	—	—	—	—	100

Source: Clerk of the U.S. House of Representatives

== Change in composition ==
=== After the January special election ===
D_{1}	D_{2}	D_{3}	D_{4}	D_{5}	D_{6}	D_{7}	D_{8}	D_{9}	D_{10}
D_{20}	D_{19}	D_{18}	D_{17}	D_{16}	D_{15}	D_{14}	D_{13}	D_{12}	D_{11}
D_{21}	D_{22}	D_{23}	D_{24}	D_{25}	D_{26}	D_{27}	D_{28}	D_{29}	D_{30}
D_{40}	D_{39}	D_{38}	D_{37}	D_{36}	D_{35}	D_{34}	D_{33}	D_{32}	D_{31}
D_{41}	D_{42}	D_{43}	D_{44}	D_{45}	D_{46}	D_{47}	D_{48}	D_{49}	D_{50}
Majority →									D_{51}
R_{41} Mass. (sp); Gain	I_{2}	I_{1}	D_{57}	D_{56}	D_{55}	D_{54}	D_{53}	D_{52}	D_{51}
R_{40}	R_{39}	R_{38}	R_{37}	R_{36}	R_{35}	R_{34}	R_{33}	R_{32}	R_{31}
R_{21}	R_{22}	R_{23}	R_{24}	R_{25}	R_{26}	R_{27}	R_{28}	R_{29}	R_{30}
R_{20}	R_{19}	R_{18}	R_{17}	R_{16}	R_{15}	R_{14}	R_{13}	R_{12}	R_{11}
R_{1}	R_{2}	R_{3}	R_{4}	R_{5}	R_{6}	R_{7}	R_{8}	R_{9}	R_{10}

=== Before the November elections ===
D_{1}	D_{2}	D_{3}	D_{4}	D_{5}	D_{6}	D_{7}	D_{8}	D_{9}	D_{10}
D_{20}	D_{19}	D_{18}	D_{17}	D_{16}	D_{15}	D_{14}	D_{13}	D_{12}	D_{11}
D_{21}	D_{22}	D_{23}	D_{24}	D_{25}	D_{26}	D_{27}	D_{28}	D_{29}	D_{30}
D_{40} Calif. Ran	D_{39} Ark. Ran	D_{38}	D_{37}	D_{36}	D_{35}	D_{34}	D_{33}	D_{32}	D_{31}
D_{41} Colo. Ran	D_{42} Hawaii; Ran	D_{43} Md. Ran	D_{44} Nev. Ran	D_{45} N.Y. (reg); Ran	D_{46} N.Y. (sp); Ran	D_{47} Ore. Ran	D_{48} Pa. Ran	D_{49} Vt. Ran	D_{50} Wash. Ran
Majority →									D_{51} Wis. Ran
R_{41} Ohio; Retired	I_{2}	I_{1}	D_{57} W.Va. (sp); Retired	D_{56} N.D. Retired	D_{55} Ind. Retired	D_{54} Ill. Retired	D_{53} Del. (sp); Retired	D_{52} Conn. Retired	D_{51} Wis. Ran
R_{40} N.H. Retired	R_{39} Mo. Retired	R_{38} Ky. Retired	R_{37} Kan. Retired	R_{36} Fla. Retired	R_{35} Utah; Ran	R_{34} S.D. Ran	R_{33} S.C. Ran	R_{32} Okla. Ran	R_{31} N.C. Ran
R_{21}	R_{22}	R_{23}	R_{24} Ala. Ran	R_{25} Alaska; Ran	R_{26} Ariz. Ran	R_{27} Ga. Ran	R_{28} Idaho; Ran	R_{29} Iowa; Ran	R_{30} La. Ran
R_{20}	R_{19}	R_{18}	R_{17}	R_{16}	R_{15}	R_{14}	R_{13}	R_{12}	R_{11}
R_{1}	R_{2}	R_{3}	R_{4}	R_{5}	R_{6}	R_{7}	R_{8}	R_{9}	R_{10}

=== Result of the November elections ===
D_{1}	D_{2}	D_{3}	D_{4}	D_{5}	D_{6}	D_{7}	D_{8}	D_{9}	D_{10}
D_{20}	D_{19}	D_{18}	D_{17}	D_{16}	D_{15}	D_{14}	D_{13}	D_{12}	D_{11}
D_{21}	D_{22}	D_{23}	D_{24}	D_{25}	D_{26}	D_{27}	D_{28}	D_{29}	D_{30}
D_{40} Colo. Elected (Note: Appointee elected)	D_{39} Calif. Re-elected	D_{38}	D_{37}	D_{36}	D_{35}	D_{34}	D_{33}	D_{32}	D_{31}
D_{41} Conn. Hold	D_{42} Del. (sp); Hold	D_{43} Hawaii; Re-elected	D_{44} Md. Re-elected	D_{45} Nev. Re-elected	D_{46} N.Y. (reg); Re-elected	D_{47} N.Y. (sp); Elected	D_{48} Ore. Re-elected	D_{49} Vt. Re-elected	D_{50} Wash. Re-elected
Majority →									D_{51} W.Va. (sp); Hold
R_{41} Utah; Hold	R_{42} Ark. Gain	R_{43} Ill. Gain (Note: Won both the regular and special elections)	R_{44} Ind. Gain	R_{45} N.D. Gain	R_{46} Pa. Gain	R_{47} Wis. Gain	I_{2}	I_{1}	D_{51} W.Va. (sp); Hold
R_{40} S.D. Re-elected	R_{39} S.C. Re-elected	R_{38} Okla. Re-elected	R_{37} Ohio; Hold	R_{36} N.C. Re-elected	R_{35} N.H. Hold	R_{34} Mo. Hold	R_{33} La. Re-elected	R_{32} Ky. Hold	R_{31} Kan. Hold
R_{21}	R_{22}	R_{23}	R_{24} Ala. Re-elected	R_{25} Alaska; Re-elected	R_{26} Ariz. Re-elected	R_{27} Fla. Hold	R_{28} Ga. Re-elected	R_{29} Idaho; Re-elected	R_{30} Iowa; Re-elected
R_{20}	R_{19}	R_{18}	R_{17}	R_{16}	R_{15}	R_{14}	R_{13}	R_{12}	R_{11}
R_{1}	R_{2}	R_{3}	R_{4}	R_{5}	R_{6}	R_{7}	R_{8}	R_{9}	R_{10}

Key:

D_{#}	Democratic
I_{#}	Independent
R_{#}	Republican

== Final pre-election predictions ==
Several sites and individuals publish predictions of competitive seats. These predictions look at factors such as the strength of the incumbent (if the incumbent is running for reelection) and the other candidates, and the state's partisan lean (reflected in part by the state's Cook Partisan Voting Index rating). The predictions assign ratings to each seat, indicating the predicted advantage that a party has in winning that seat.

Most election predictors used:

- "tossup": no advantage
- "tilt" (used by some predictors): advantage that is not quite as strong as "lean"
- "lean": slight advantage
- "likely" or "favored": significant, but surmountable, advantage
- "safe" or "solid": near-certain chance of victory

Where a site gives a percentage probability as its primary indicator of expected outcome, the chart below classifies a race as follows:

- Tossup: 50-55%
- Tilt: 56-60%
- Lean: 61-75%
- Likely: 76-93%
- Safe: 94-100%

Constituency		Incumbent	2010 election ratings					
State	Senator	Last election (Note: The last elections for this group of senators were in 2004, except for those elected in a special election or who were appointed after the resignation or passing of a sitting senator, as noted.)	Cook	Rothenberg	RCP	Sabato	CQ Politics	Result
Alabama	Richard Shelby	67.5% R	Safe R	Safe R	Safe R	Safe R	Safe R	Shelby; 65.2% R
Alaska	Lisa Murkowski (lost renomination)	48.6% R	Likely R	Safe R	Likely R	Likely R	Likely R	Murkowski; 39.5% R (Note: In the 2010 election, Republican nominee Joe Miller won 35.5% of the vote. Murkowski won as a write-in candidate with 39.5% of the vote.)
Arizona	John McCain	76.7% R	Safe R	Safe R	Safe R	Safe R	Safe R	McCain; 59.2% R
Arkansas	Blanche Lincoln	55.9% D	Lean R (flip)	Likely R (flip)	Safe R (flip)	Safe R (flip)	Lean R (flip)	Boozman; 57.9% R (flip)
California	Barbara Boxer	57.7% D	Tossup	Tilt D	Tossup	Lean D	Lean D	Boxer; 52.2% D
Colorado	Michael Bennet	Appointed (2009) (Note: Democrat Ken Salazar won with 51.3% of the vote in 2004, but resigned on January 21, 2009 to become United States Secretary of the Interior.)	Tossup	Tossup	Tossup	Lean R (flip)	Tossup	Bennet; 48.1% D
Connecticut	Chris Dodd (retired)	66.4% D	Lean D	Likely D	Lean D	Lean D	Lean D	Blumenthal; 55.2% D
Delaware (special)	Ted Kaufman (retired)	Appointed (2009) (Note: Democrat Joe Biden won in 2008 with 64.7% of the vote, but resigned on January 15, 2009, to become the vice president of the United States.)	Likely D	Likely D	Likely D	Likely D	Likely D	Coons; 56.6% D
Florida	George LeMieux (retired)	Appointed (2009) (Note: Republican Mel Martínez won with 49.4% of the vote in 2004, but resigned on September 9, 2009.)	Safe R	Safe R	Likely R	Safe R	Likely R	Rubio; 48.9% R
Georgia	Johnny Isakson	57.9% R	Safe R	Safe R	Safe R	Safe R	Safe R	Isakson; 58.3% R
Hawaii	Daniel Inouye	75.5% D	Safe D	Safe D	Safe D	Safe D	Safe D	Inouye; 74.8% D
Idaho	Mike Crapo	99.2% R	Safe R	Safe R	Safe R	Safe R	Safe R	Crapo; 71.2% R
Illinois	Roland Burris (retired)	Appointed (2009) (Note: Democrat Barack Obama won in 2004 with 70.0% of the vote, but resigned on November 16, 2008, after being elected president of the United States.)	Tossup	Tilt R (flip)	Tossup	Lean R (flip)	Tossup	Kirk; 48.0% R (flip)
Indiana	Evan Bayh (retired)	61.7% D	Safe R (flip)	Lean R (flip)	Likely R (flip)	Likely R (flip)	Safe R (flip)	Coats; 54.6% R (flip)
Iowa	Chuck Grassley	70.2% R	Safe R	Safe R	Safe R	Safe R	Safe R	Grassley; 64.4% R
Kansas	Sam Brownback (retired)	69.9% R	Safe R	Safe R	Safe R	Safe R	Safe R	Moran; 70.1% R
Kentucky	Jim Bunning (retired)	50.7% R	Lean R	Lean R	Lean R	Lean R	Lean R	Paul; 55.7% R
Louisiana	David Vitter	51.0% R	Lean R	Likely R	Likely R	Likely R	Likely R	Vitter; 56.6% R
Massachusetts (special)	Paul G. Kirk (retired)	Appointed (2009) (Note: Democrat Ted Kennedy won in 2006 with 69.3% of the vote, but died on August 25, 2009.)	Tossup	Lean R (flip)	Tossup	Tossup	Tossup	Brown; 51.6% R (flip)
Maryland	Barbara Mikulski	64.8% D	Safe D	Safe D	Safe D	Safe D	Safe D	Mikulski; 62.2% D
Missouri	Kit Bond (retired)	56.1% R	Lean R	Lean R	Likely R	Likely R	Lean R	Blunt; 54.2% R
Nevada	Harry Reid	61.0% D	Tossup	Tossup	Tossup	Lean R (flip)	Tossup	Reid; 50.3% D
New Hampshire	Judd Gregg (retired)	66.2% R	Lean R	Safe R	Lean R	Likely R	Lean R	Ayotte; 60.1% R
New York (regular)	Chuck Schumer	71.2% D	Safe D	Safe D	Safe D	Safe D	Safe D	Schumer; 66.3% D
New York (special)	Kirsten Gillibrand	Appointed (2009) (Note: Democrat Hillary Clinton won with 67.0% of the vote in 2006, but resigned on January 21, 2009 to become United States Secretary of State.)	Safe D	Safe D	Likely D	Safe D	Safe D	Gillibrand; 63.0% D
North Carolina	Richard Burr	51.6% R	Likely R	Likely R	Likely R	Likely R	Likely R	Burr; 54.8% R
North Dakota	Byron Dorgan (retired)	68.3% D	Safe R (flip)	Safe R (flip)	Safe R (flip)	Safe R (flip)	Safe R (flip)	Hoeven; 76.1% R (flip)
Ohio	George Voinovich (retired)	63.9% R	Safe R	Safe R	Safe R	Likely R	Safe R	Portman; 56.8% R
Oklahoma	Tom Coburn	52.8% R	Safe R	Safe R	Safe R	Safe R	Safe R	Coburn; 70.6% R
Oregon	Ron Wyden	63.4% D	Safe D	Safe D	Likely D	Safe D	Safe D	Wyden; 57.2% D
Pennsylvania	Arlen Specter (lost renomination)	52.6% R (Note: Switched to the Democratic Party in 2009, last elected as a Republican.)	Tossup	Tilt R (flip)	Tossup	Lean R (flip)	Tossup	Toomey; 51.0% R (flip)
South Carolina	Jim DeMint	53.7% R	Safe R	Safe R	Safe R	Safe R	Safe R	DeMint; 61.5% R
South Dakota	John Thune	60.6% R	Safe R	Safe R	Safe R	Safe R	Safe R	Thune; 100.0% R
Utah	Bob Bennett (lost renomination)	68.6% R	Safe R	Safe R	Safe R	Safe R	Safe R	Lee; 61.6% R
Vermont	Patrick Leahy	70.6% D	Safe D	Safe D	Safe D	Safe D	Safe D	Leahy; 64.4% D
Washington	Patty Murray	55.0% D	Tossup	Tossup	Tossup	Lean D	Tossup	Murray; 52.4%
West Virginia (special)	Carte Goodwin (retired)	Appointed (2010) (Note: Democrat Robert Byrd won with 64.4% of the vote in 2006, but died on June 28, 2010.)	Tossup	Tilt D	Tossup	Lean D	Tossup	Manchin; 53.5%
Wisconsin	Russ Feingold	55.3% D	Lean R (flip)	Lean R (flip)	Lean R (flip)	Lean R (flip)	Lean R (flip)	Johnson; 51.6% R (flip)

== Gains and losses ==
Map of retirements: Republican incumbent Democratic incumbent Democratic incumbent retired or lost renomination Republican incumbent retired or lost renomination

Senate composition as a result of the 2010 elections.

Vote by county (click image for more details)

=== Retirements ===
Three Democrats and six Republicans retired rather than seek re-election. Three Democrats retired rather than seek election to finish the unexpired term and one Democrat retired rather than seek election to finish the unexpired term and election to a full term.

State	Senator	Age at end of term	Assumed office	Replaced by
Connecticut	Chris Dodd	66	1981	Richard Blumenthal
Delaware (special)	Ted Kaufman	71	2009 (Note: Appointed to the seat following the resignation of Joe Biden.)	Chris Coons
Florida	George LeMieux	41	2009 (Note: Appointed to the seat following the resignation of Mel Martínez.)	Marco Rubio
Illinois	Roland Burris	73	2009 (Note: Appointed to the seat following the resignation of Barack Obama.)	Mark Kirk
Indiana	Evan Bayh	55	1999	Dan Coats
Kansas	Sam Brownback	54	1996 (Note: Elected in the special election to finish Bob Dole's term.)	Jerry Moran
Kentucky	Jim Bunning	79	1999	Rand Paul
Massachusetts (special)	Paul G. Kirk	72	2009 (Note: Appointed to the seat following the death of Ted Kennedy.)	Scott Brown
Missouri	Kit Bond	71	1987	Roy Blunt
New Hampshire	Judd Gregg	63	1993	Kelly Ayotte
North Dakota	Byron Dorgan	68	1992	John Hoeven
Ohio	George Voinovich	75	1999	Rob Portman
West Virginia (special)	Carte Goodwin	36	2010 (Note: Appointed to the seat following the death of Robert Byrd.)	Joe Manchin

=== Defeats ===
Three Democrats and one Republican sought re-election but lost in either the primary or general election.

State	Senator	Age at end of term	Assumed office	Replaced by
Arkansas	Blanche Lincoln	50	1999	John Boozman
Pennsylvania	Arlen Specter	80	1981	Pat Toomey
Utah	Bob Bennett	77	1993	Mike Lee
Wisconsin	Russ Feingold	57	1993	Ron Johnson

=== Post-election changes ===
One Republican resigned on May 3, 2011, and was replaced by an appointee.

State	Senator	Replaced by
Nevada (Class 1)	John Ensign	Dean Heller

== Race summary ==
=== Special elections during the 111th Congress ===
In these special elections, the winner was seated in the fall of 2010 (excluding Massachusetts), once they qualified and their elections were certified. Sorted by election date, then state, then class.

State	Incumbent			Result	Candidates
State	Senator	Party	Electoral history	Result	Candidates
Massachusetts (Class 1)	Paul G. Kirk	Democratic	2009 (appointed)	Interim appointee ineligible to run. New senator elected January 19, 2010 and seated February 4, 2010. Republican gain.	▌ ✓ Scott Brown (Republican) 51.9%; ▌Martha Coakley (Democratic) 47.1%; ▌Joseph L. Kennedy (Libertarian) 1.0%
Delaware (Class 2)	Ted Kaufman	Democratic	2009 (appointed)	Interim appointee retired. New senator elected November 2, 2010 and seated November 15, 2010. Democratic hold.	▌ ✓ Chris Coons (Democratic) 56.6%; ▌Christine O'Donnell (Republican) 40.0%; ▌Glenn Miller (Independent) 2.7%; ▌James Rash (Libertarian) 0.7%
Illinois (Class 3)	Roland Burris	Democratic	2009 (appointed)	Interim appointee retired. New senator elected November 2, 2010 and seated November 29, 2010. Winner also elected to next term; see below. Republican gain.	▌ ✓ Mark Kirk (Republican) 48.2%; ▌Alexi Giannoulias (Democratic) 46.3%; ▌LeAlan Jones (Green) 3.2%; ▌Mike Labino (Libertarian) 2.4%
New York (Class 1)	Kirsten Gillibrand	Democratic	2009 (appointed)	Interim appointee elected November 2, 2010.	▌ ✓ Kirsten Gillibrand (Democratic) 59.6%; ▌Joe DioGuardi (Republican) 33.3%; Others: ▌Cecile A. Lawrence (Green) 0.8%; ▌John Clifton (Libertarian) 0.4%; ▌Joseph Huff (Rent Is Too Damn High) 0.4%
West Virginia (Class 1)	Carte Goodwin	Democratic	2010 (appointed)	Interim appointee retired. New senator elected November 2, 2010 and seated November 15, 2010. Democratic hold.	▌ ✓ Joe Manchin (Democratic) 53.5%; ▌John Raese (Republican) 43.4%; Others: ▌Jesse Johnson (Mountain) 1.9%; ▌Jeff Becker (Constitution) 1.2%

=== Elections leading to the next Congress ===
In these regular elections, the winners were elected for the term beginning January 3, 2011; ordered by state.

All of the elections involved the Class 3 seats.

State	Incumbent			Result	Candidates
State	Senator	Party	Electoral history	Result	Candidates
Alabama	Richard Shelby	Republican	1986 (Note: Senator Richard Shelby was originally elected as a Democrat in 1986 and 1992 before switching to a Republican in 1994. Shelby won re-election as a Republican in 1998 and 2004.); 1992; 1998; 2004	Incumbent re-elected.	▌ ✓ Richard Shelby (Republican) 65.3%; ▌William G. Barnes (Democratic) 34.7%
Alaska	Lisa Murkowski	Republican	2002 (appointed); 2004	Incumbent lost renomination, but was re-elected as a write-in candidate.	▌ ✓ Lisa Murkowski (Republican write-in) 39.5%; ▌Joe Miller (Republican) 35.5%; ▌Scott McAdams (Democratic) 23.5%
Arizona	John McCain	Republican	1986; 1992; 1998; 2004	Incumbent re-elected.	▌ ✓ John McCain (Republican) 59.2%; ▌Rodney Glassman (Democratic) 34.7%; ▌David Nolan (Libertarian) 4.7%; ▌Jerry Joslyn (Green) 1.4%
Arkansas	Blanche Lincoln	Democratic	1998; 2004	Incumbent lost re-election. Republican gain.	▌ ✓ John Boozman (Republican) 58.0%; ▌Blanche Lincoln (Democratic) 36.9%; ▌Trevor Drown (Independent) 3.3%; ▌John Gray (Green) 1.9%
California	Barbara Boxer	Democratic	1992; 1998; 2004	Incumbent re-elected.	▌ ✓ Barbara Boxer (Democratic) 52.1%; ▌Carly Fiorina (Republican) 42.5%; Others: ▌Gail Lightfoot (Libertarian) 1.8%; ▌Marsha Feinland (Peace and Freedom) 1.3%; ▌Edward Noonan (American Independent) 1.3%; ▌Duane Roberts (Green) 1.2%
Colorado	Michael Bennet	Democratic	2009 (appointed)	Interim appointee elected.	▌ ✓ Michael Bennet (Democratic) 48.1%; ▌Ken Buck (Republican) 46.3%; Others: ▌Bob Kinsey (Green) 2.2%; ▌Maclyn Stringer (Libertarian) 1.3%
Connecticut	Chris Dodd	Democratic	1980; 1986; 1992; 1998; 2004	Incumbent retired. Democratic hold.	▌ ✓ Richard Blumenthal (Democratic) 55.1%; ▌Linda McMahon (Republican) 43.3%; Others: ▌Warren Mosler (Independent) 1.0%; ▌John Mertens (CfL) 0.6%
Florida	George LeMieux	Republican	2009 (appointed)	Interim appointee retired. Republican hold.	▌ ✓ Marco Rubio (Republican) 48.9%; ▌Charlie Crist (Independent) 29.7%; ▌Kendrick Meek (Democratic) 20.1%; ▌Alexander Snitker (Libertarian) 0.5%
Georgia	Johnny Isakson	Republican	2004	Incumbent re-elected.	▌ ✓ Johnny Isakson (Republican) 58.1%; ▌Mike Thurmond (Democratic) 39.2%; ▌Chuck Donovan (Libertarian) 2.7%
Hawaii	Daniel Inouye	Democratic	1962; 1968; 1974; 1980; 1986; 1992; 1998; 2004	Incumbent re-elected.	▌ ✓ Daniel Inouye (Democratic) 74.8%; ▌Campbell Cavasso (Republican) 21.6%; Others: ▌James Brewer (Green) 2.1%; ▌Jeff Mallan (Libertarian) 0.8%
Idaho	Mike Crapo	Republican	1998; 2004	Incumbent re-elected.	▌ ✓ Mike Crapo (Republican) 71.1%; ▌Tom Sullivan (Democratic) 25.0%; ▌Randy Bergquist (Constitution) 3.9%
Illinois	Roland Burris	Democratic	2009 (appointed)	Interim appointee retired. Kirk was also elected to finish the previous term; see above. Republican gain.	▌ ✓ Mark Kirk (Republican) 48.2%; ▌Alexi Giannoulias (Democratic) 46.3%; ▌LeAlan Jones (Green) 3.2%; ▌Mike Labino (Libertarian) 2.4%
Indiana	Evan Bayh	Democratic	1998; 2004	Incumbent retired. Republican gain.	▌ ✓ Dan Coats (Republican) 54.6%; ▌Brad Ellsworth (Democratic) 40.0%; ▌Rebecca Sink-Burris (Libertarian) 5.4%
Iowa	Chuck Grassley	Republican	1980; 1986; 1992; 1998; 2004	Incumbent re-elected.	▌ ✓ Chuck Grassley (Republican) 64.5%; ▌Roxanne Conlin (Democratic) 33.2%; ▌John Heiderscheit (Libertarian) 2.3%
Kansas	Sam Brownback	Republican	1996 (special); 1998; 2004	Incumbent retired to run for Governor of Kansas. Republican hold.	▌ ✓ Jerry Moran (Republican) 70.3%; ▌Lisa Johnston (Democratic) 26.2%; Others: ▌Michael Dann (Libertarian) 2.1%; ▌Joe Bellis (Reform) 1.4%
Kentucky	Jim Bunning	Republican	1998; 2004	Incumbent retired. Republican hold.	▌ ✓ Rand Paul (Republican) 55.8%; ▌Jack Conway (Democratic) 44.2%
Louisiana	David Vitter	Republican	2004	Incumbent re-elected.	▌ ✓ David Vitter (Republican) 56.6%; ▌Charlie Melançon (Democratic) 37.7%; Others: ▌Randall Hayes (Libertarian) 1.1%; ▌Michael Brown (Independent) 0.8%
Maryland	Barbara Mikulski	Democratic	1986; 1992; 1998; 2004	Incumbent re-elected.	▌ ✓ Barbara Mikulski (Democratic) 61.8%; ▌Eric Wargotz (Republican) 36.3%; Others: ▌Kenniss Henry (Green) 1.1%; ▌Richard Shawver (Constitution) 0.8%
Missouri	Kit Bond	Republican	1986; 1992; 1998; 2004	Incumbent retired. Republican hold.	▌ ✓ Roy Blunt (Republican) 54.3%; ▌Robin Carnahan (Democratic) 40.6%; ▌Jonathan Dine (Libertarian) 3.0%; ▌Jerry Beck (Constitution) 2.1%
Nevada	Harry Reid	Democratic	1986; 1992; 1998; 2004	Incumbent re-elected.	▌ ✓ Harry Reid (Democratic) 50.2%; ▌Sharron Angle (Republican) 44.6%; Others: None of These Candidates 2.2%; ▌Scott Ashjian (Tea) 0.8%
New Hampshire	Judd Gregg	Republican	1992; 1998; 2004	Incumbent retired. Republican hold.	▌ ✓ Kelly Ayotte (Republican) 60.2%; ▌Paul Hodes (Democratic) 36.7%; Others: ▌Chris Booth (Independent) 2.0%; ▌Ken Blevens (Libertarian) 1.0%
New York	Chuck Schumer	Democratic	1998; 2004	Incumbent re-elected.	▌ ✓ Chuck Schumer (Democratic) 66.3%; ▌Jay Townsend (Republican) 32.2%; Others: ▌Colia Clark (Green) 1.0%; ▌Randy Credico (Libertarian) 0.6%
North Carolina	Richard Burr	Republican	2004	Incumbent re-elected.	▌ ✓ Richard Burr (Republican) 55.0%; ▌Elaine Marshall (Democratic) 42.9%; ▌Mike Beitler (Libertarian) 2.1%
North Dakota	Byron Dorgan	Democratic-NPL	1992; 1998; 2004	Incumbent retired. Republican gain.	▌ ✓ John Hoeven (Republican) 76.2%; ▌Tracy Potter (Democratic–NPL) 22.2%; ▌Keith Hanson (Libertarian) 1.6%
Ohio	George Voinovich	Republican	1998; 2004	Incumbent retired. Republican hold.	▌ ✓ Rob Portman (Republican) 57.3%; ▌Lee Fisher (Democratic) 39.0%; Others: ▌Eric Deaton (Constitution) 1.7%; ▌Michael Pryce (Independent) 1.3%
Oklahoma	Tom Coburn	Republican	2004	Incumbent re-elected.	▌ ✓ Tom Coburn (Republican) 70.5%; ▌Jim Rogers (Democratic) 26.1%; Others: ▌Stephen Wallace (Independent) 2.5%; ▌Ronald Dwyer (Independent) 0.9%
Oregon	Ron Wyden	Democratic	1996 (special); 1998; 2004	Incumbent re-elected.	▌ ✓ Ron Wyden (Democratic) 57.2%; ▌Jim Huffman (Republican) 39.4%; Others: ▌Bruce Cronk (Working Families) 1.3%; ▌Marc Delphine (Libertarian) 1.1%; ▌Rick Staggenborg (Progressive) 1.0%
Pennsylvania	Arlen Specter	Democratic	1980 (Note: Senator Arlen Specter was originally elected as a Republican in 1980 and was subsequently re-elected in 1986, 1992, 1998 and 2004.); 1986; 1992; 1998; 2004	Incumbent lost renomination. Republican gain.	▌ ✓ Pat Toomey (Republican) 51.01%; ▌Joe Sestak (Democratic) 48.99%
South Carolina	Jim DeMint	Republican	2004	Incumbent re-elected.	▌ ✓ Jim DeMint (Republican) 62.4%; ▌Alvin Greene (Democratic) 28.2%; ▌Tom Clements (Green) 9.4%
South Dakota	John Thune	Republican	2004	Incumbent re-elected.	▌ ✓ John Thune (Republican); Unopposed
Utah	Bob Bennett	Republican	1992; 1998; 2004	Incumbent lost renomination. Republican hold.	▌ ✓ Mike Lee (Republican) 61.6%; ▌Sam Granato (Democratic) 32.8%; ▌Scott Bradley (Constitution) 5.7%
Vermont	Patrick Leahy	Democratic	1974; 1980; 1986; 1992; 1998; 2004	Incumbent re-elected.	▌ ✓ Patrick Leahy (Democratic) 64.4%; ▌Len Britton (Republican) 30.9%; Others: ▌Daniel Freilich (Independent) 1.5%; ▌Cris Ericson (Independent) 1.1%; ▌Stephen Cain (Independent) 1.0%
Washington	Patty Murray	Democratic	1992; 1998; 2004	Incumbent re-elected.	▌ ✓ Patty Murray (Democratic) 52.4%; ▌Dino Rossi (Republican) 47.6%
Wisconsin	Russ Feingold	Democratic	1992; 1998; 2004	Incumbent lost re-election. Republican gain.	▌ ✓ Ron Johnson (Republican) 51.9%; ▌Russ Feingold (Democratic) 47.0%; ▌Rob Taylor (Constitution) 1.1%

== Closest races ==
Seven November races, as well as the Massachusetts special election in January, had margins less than 10%:

District	Winner	Margin
Illinois	Republican (flip)	1.6%
Colorado	Democratic	1.7%
Pennsylvania	Republican (flip)	2.0%
Alaska	Republican	4.0% (Note: Alaska margin given as the difference between Murkowski, running as a write-in candidate, and Miller, who won the Republican primary.)
Washington	Democratic	4.7%
Massachusetts	Republican (flip)	4.8%
Wisconsin	Republican (flip)	4.8%
Nevada	Democratic	5.7%

California was the tipping point state, where Barbara Boxer (D) defeated Carly Fiorina (R) by a margin of 10.0%.

== Alabama ==
Alabama election
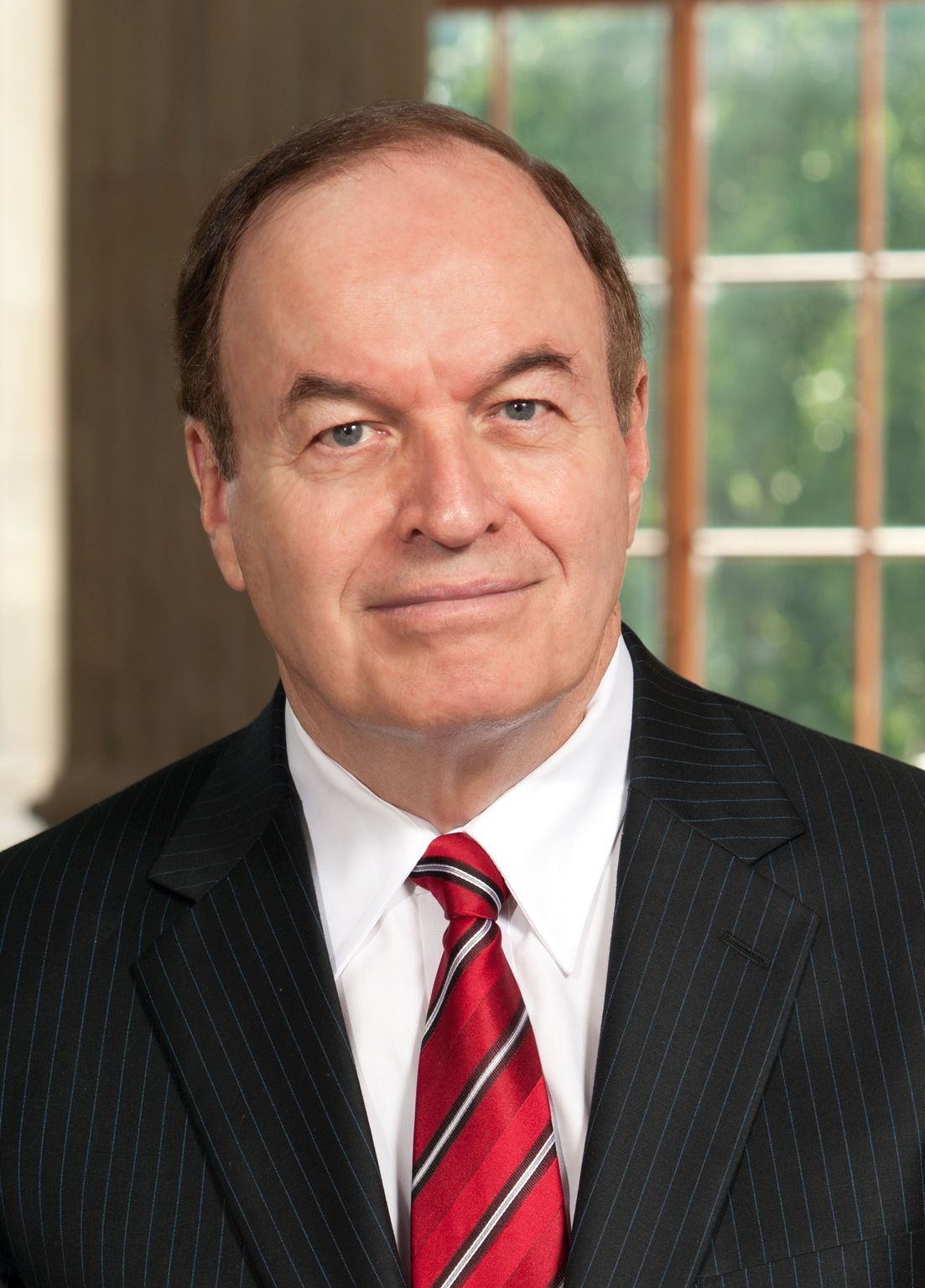

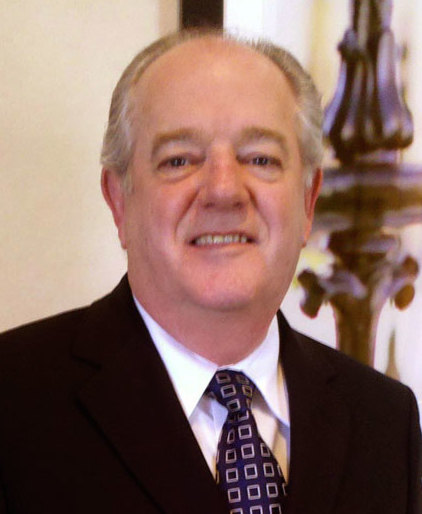
Nominee	Richard Shelby	William G. Barnes
Party	Republican	Democratic
Popular vote	967,861	515,049
Percentage	65.3%	34.7%
- County results Shelby: 50–60% 60–70% 70–80% 80–90% Barnes: 50–60% 60–70% 70–80% 80–90%
U.S. senator before election
Richard Shelby
Republican
Elected U.S. Senator
Richard Shelby
Republican

Incumbent Republican Richard Shelby won re-election to a fifth term. On November 9, 1994, Shelby switched his party affiliation from Democratic to Republican, one day after the Republicans won control of both houses in the midterm elections, giving the Republicans a 53–47 majority in the Senate. He won his first full term as a Republican in 1998 by a large margin, and faced no significant opposition in 2004 and 2010.

Republican primary election
Party	Candidate	Votes	%
Republican	Richard Shelby (Incumbent)	405,042	84.4%
Republican	Clint Moser	75,190	15.6%
Total votes		479,189	100.0%

Shelby had over $17 million in the bank, one of the highest of any candidate in the country. He had become even more popular in his opposition to the Troubled Asset Relief Program (TARP) and the Emergency Economic Stabilization Act of 2008, as the ranking member of the Senate Banking Committee.

In May, Shelby told reporters "I don't even know who my opponent is."

2010 United States Senate election in Alabama
Party	Candidate	Votes	%
Republican	Richard Shelby (Incumbent)	968,181	65.3%
Democratic	William G. Barnes	515,619	34.7%
Total votes		1,482,910	100.0%
Turnout			N/A
Republican hold			

== Alaska ==
Alaska election
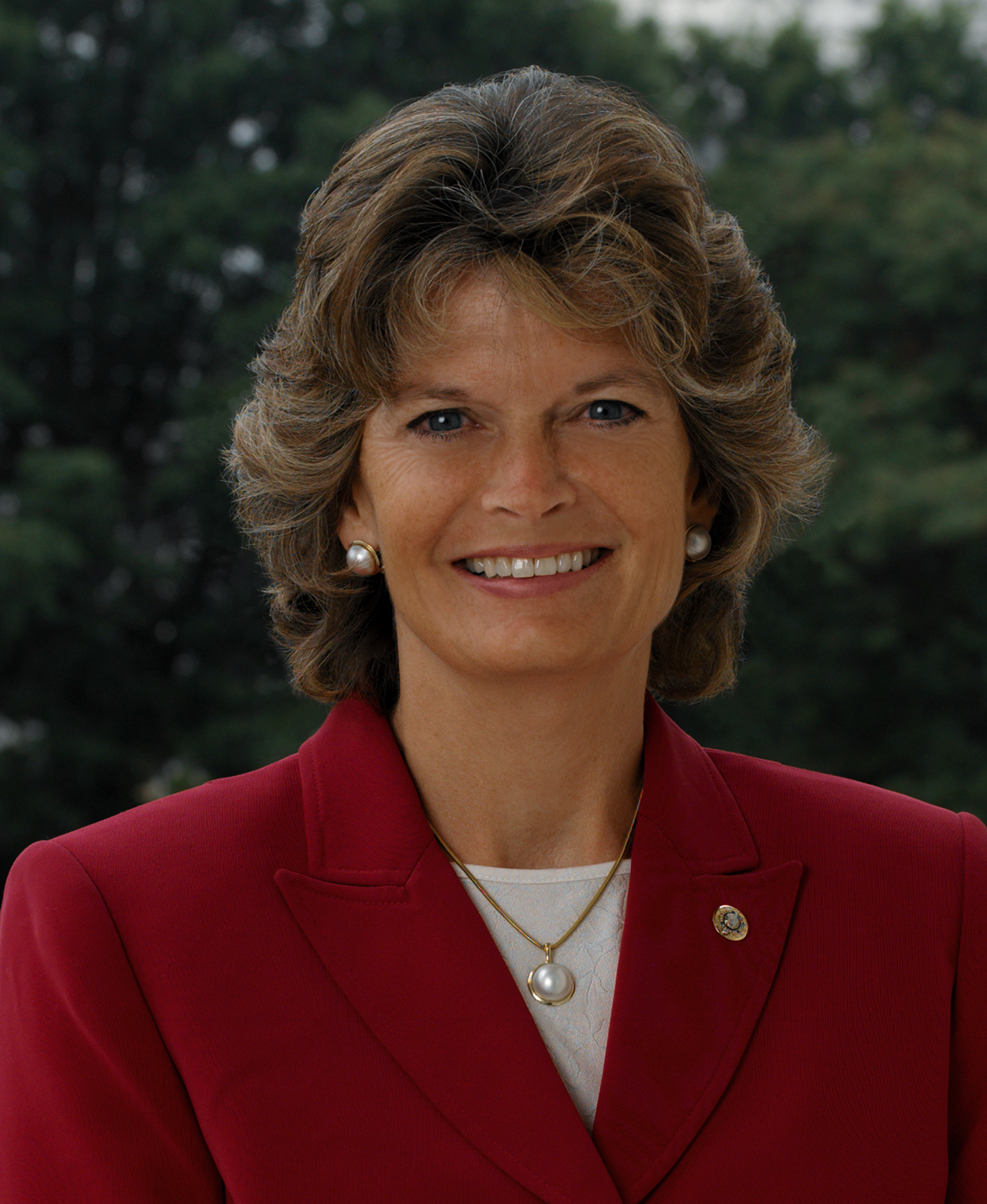

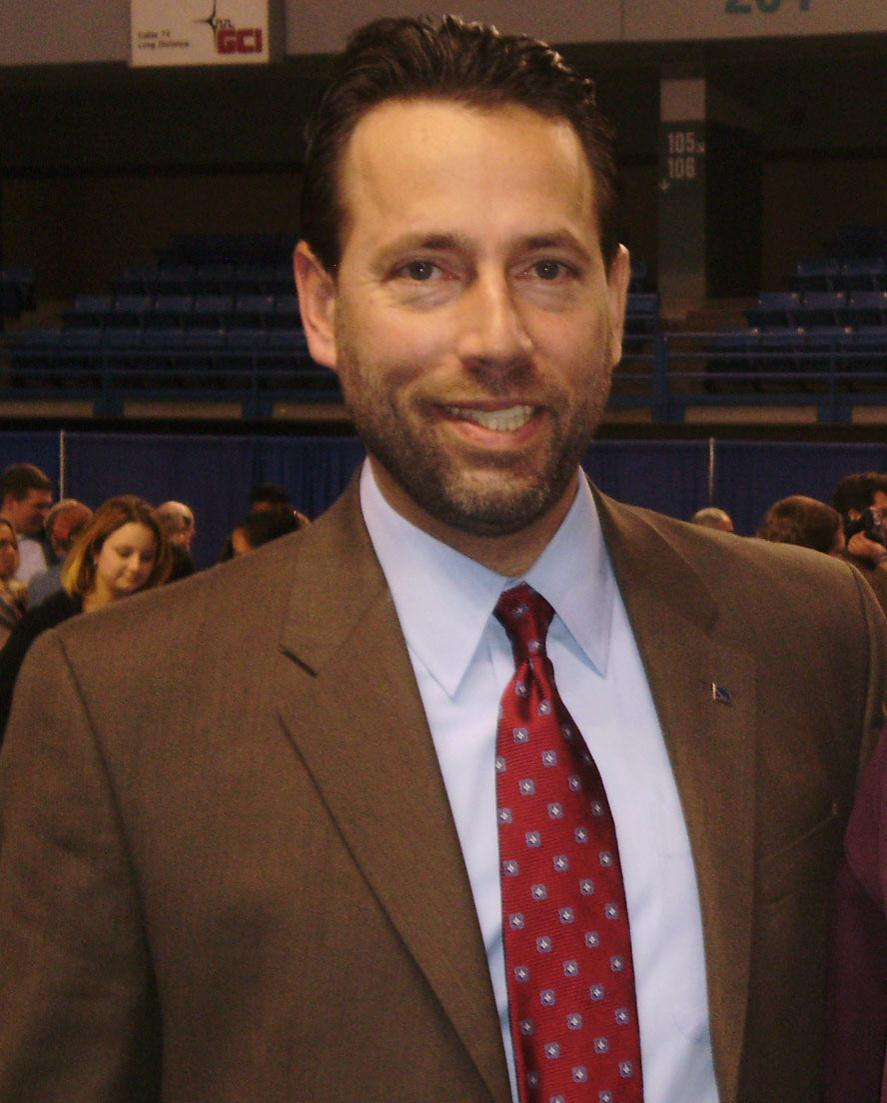

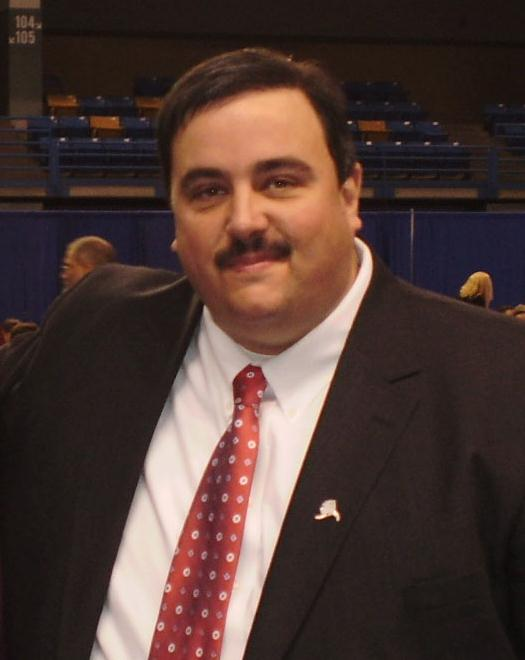
Candidate	Lisa Murkowski	Joe Miller	Scott McAdams
Party	Republican	Republican	Democratic
Popular vote	101,091	90,839	60,045
Percentage	39.5%	35.5%	23.5%
- Borough and census area results Murkowski: 40–50% 50–60% 60–70% 70–80% Miller: 30–40% 40–50% 50–60% McAdams: 30–40% 40–50%
U.S. senator before election
Lisa Murkowski
Republican
Elected U.S. Senator
Lisa Murkowski
Republican

The November general election in Alaska was preceded by primary elections which were held August 24, 2010. Scott McAdams, the Mayor of Sitka, became the Democratic nominee and Joe Miller, an attorney and former federal magistrate, became the Republican nominee after defeating incumbent Senator Lisa Murkowski in the Republican primary.

Murkowski garnered more than 100,000 write-in votes in the general election, many of which were challenged by Miller for various errors including minor misspellings. The appeal was denied Even if all the challenged votes were thrown out, Murkowski would have still had a lead of over 2,100 votes.

Alaska Democratic primary election
Party	Candidate	Votes	%
Democratic	Scott McAdams	18,035	49.99%
Democratic	Jacob Seth Kern	6,913	19.16%
Libertarian	David Haase	5,793	16.06%
Democratic	Frank Vondersaar	5,339	14.80%
Total votes		36,080	100.00%
Turnout			32%

Republican primary election
Party	Candidate	Votes	%
Republican	Joe Miller	55,878	50.91%
Republican	Lisa Murkowski (Incumbent)	53,872	49.09%
Total votes		109,750	100.00%
Turnout			32%

Alaska general election
Party	Candidate	Votes	%
Write-In	Lisa Murkowski (Incumbent)	101,091	39.49%
Republican	Joe Miller	90,839	35.49%
Democratic	Scott McAdams	60,045	23.46%
Libertarian	David Haase	1,459	0.57%
Independent	Timothy Carter	927	0.36%
Independent	Ted Gianoutsos	458	0.18%
Write-In	Other write-in votes	1,143	0.44%
Invalid or blank votes		2,784	1.08%
Total votes		258,746	100.00%
Turnout			52.3%

== Arizona ==
Arizona election
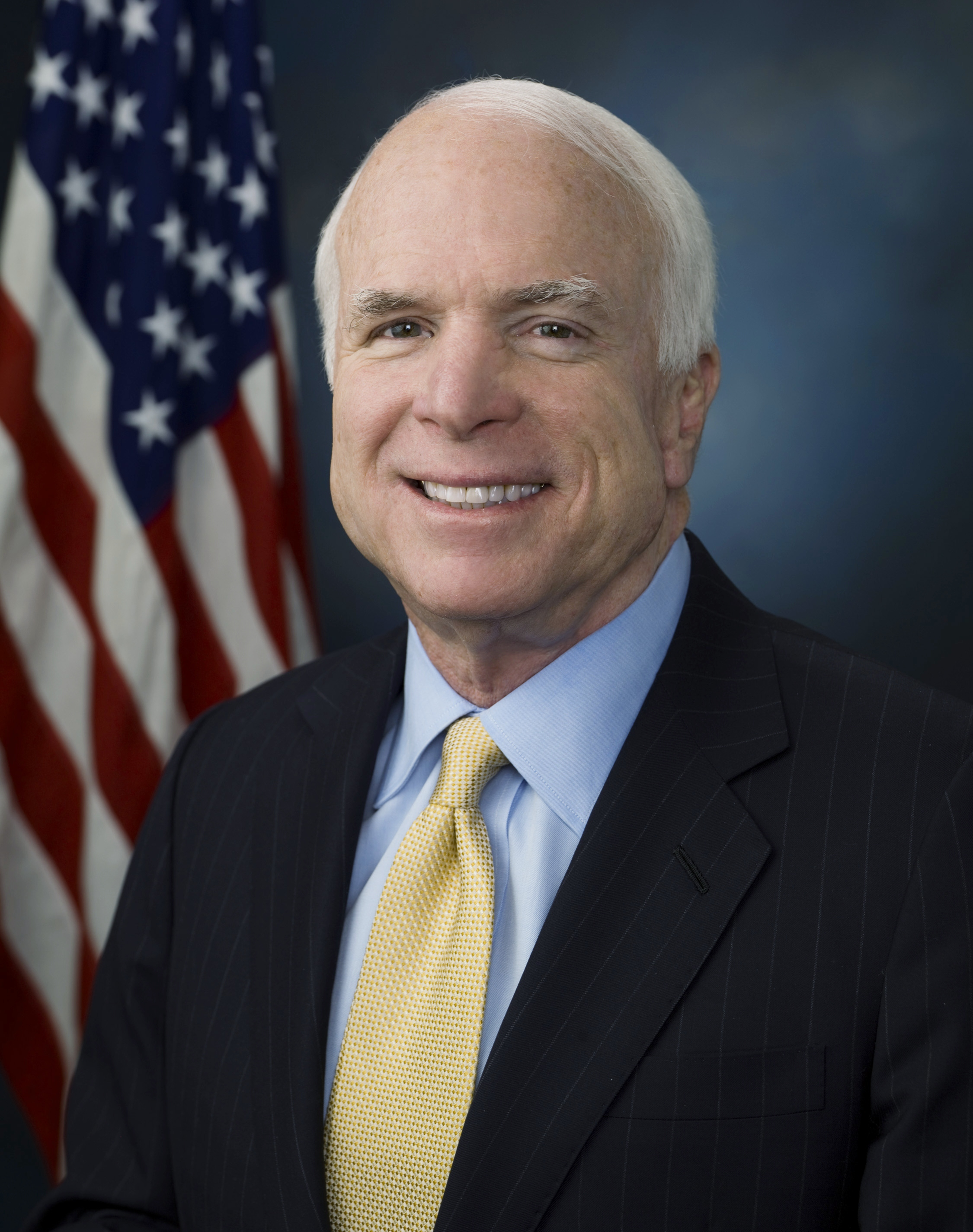

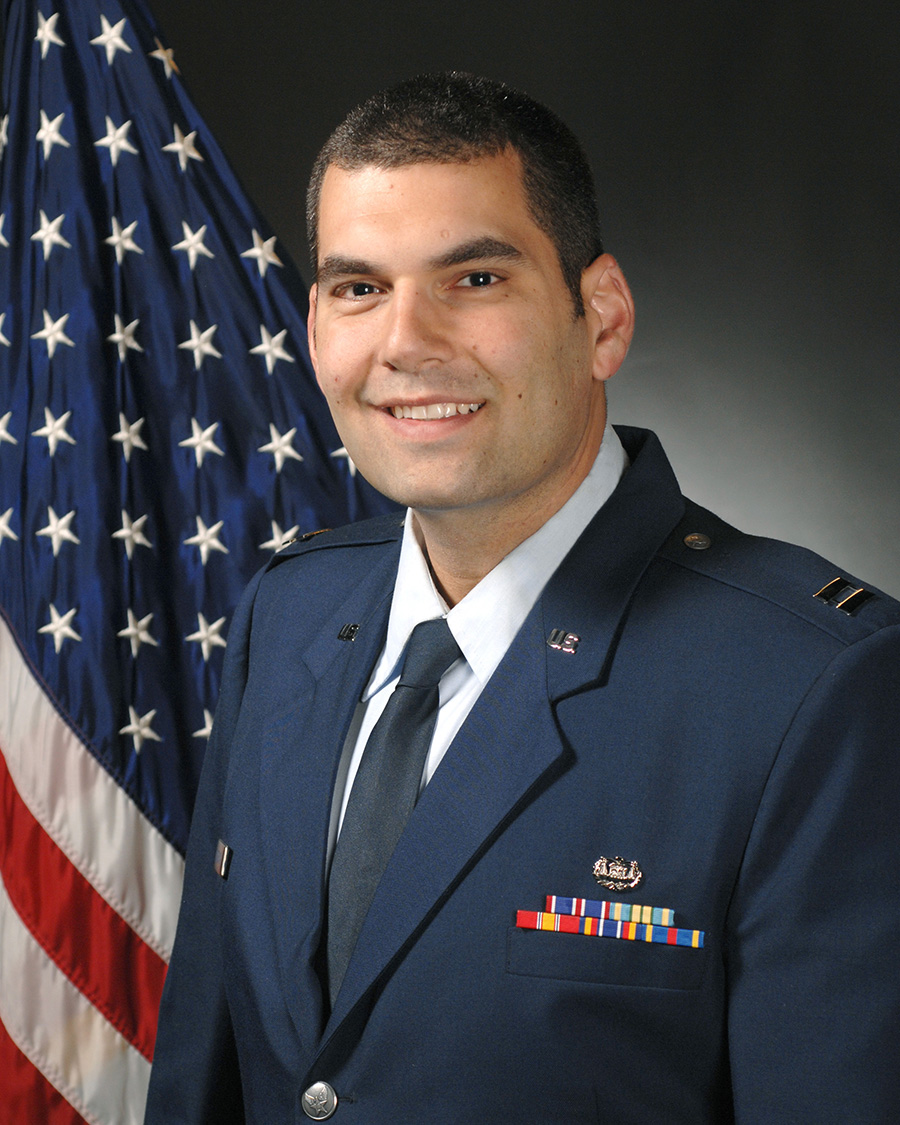
Nominee	John McCain	Rodney Glassman
Party	Republican	Democratic
Popular vote	1,005,615	592,011
Percentage	58.7%	34.5%
- McCain: 40–50% 50–60% 60–70% Glassman: 50–60%
U.S. senator before election
John McCain
Republican
Elected U.S. Senator
John McCain
Republican

Incumbent Republican John McCain, who returned to the Senate after losing the presidency to Barack Obama in the 2008 presidential election, ran for re-election to a fifth term and won.

Democratic primary election
Party	Candidate	Votes	%
Democratic	Rodney Glassman	86,881	34.7%
Democratic	Cathy Eden	66,421	26.5%
Democratic	John Dougherty	60,262	24.1%
Democratic	Randy Parraz	36,637	14.6%
Total votes		250,201	100.0%

Republican primary election
Party	Candidate	Votes	%
Republican	John McCain (Incumbent)	284,374	56.2%
Republican	J.D. Hayworth	162,502	32.1%
Republican	Jim Deakin	59,447	11.7%
Total votes		506,323	100.0%

After spending over $20 million during the primaries, McCain still had more than $1million cash on hand after the primary election. Glassman criticized McCain on women's issues. In August 2010, Glassman released a TV advertisement called "Arizona First."

2010 United States Senate election in Arizona
Party	Candidate	Votes	%	±%
Republican	John McCain (Incumbent)	1,005,615	59.07%	−17.67%
Democratic	Rodney Glassman	592,011	34.78%	+14.16%
Libertarian	David Nolan	80,097	4.71%	+2.06%
Green	Jerry Joslyn	24,603	1.45%	N/A
Majority		413,604	24.30%	
Total votes		1,702,326	100.00%	
Republican hold		Swing		

== Arkansas ==
Arkansas election
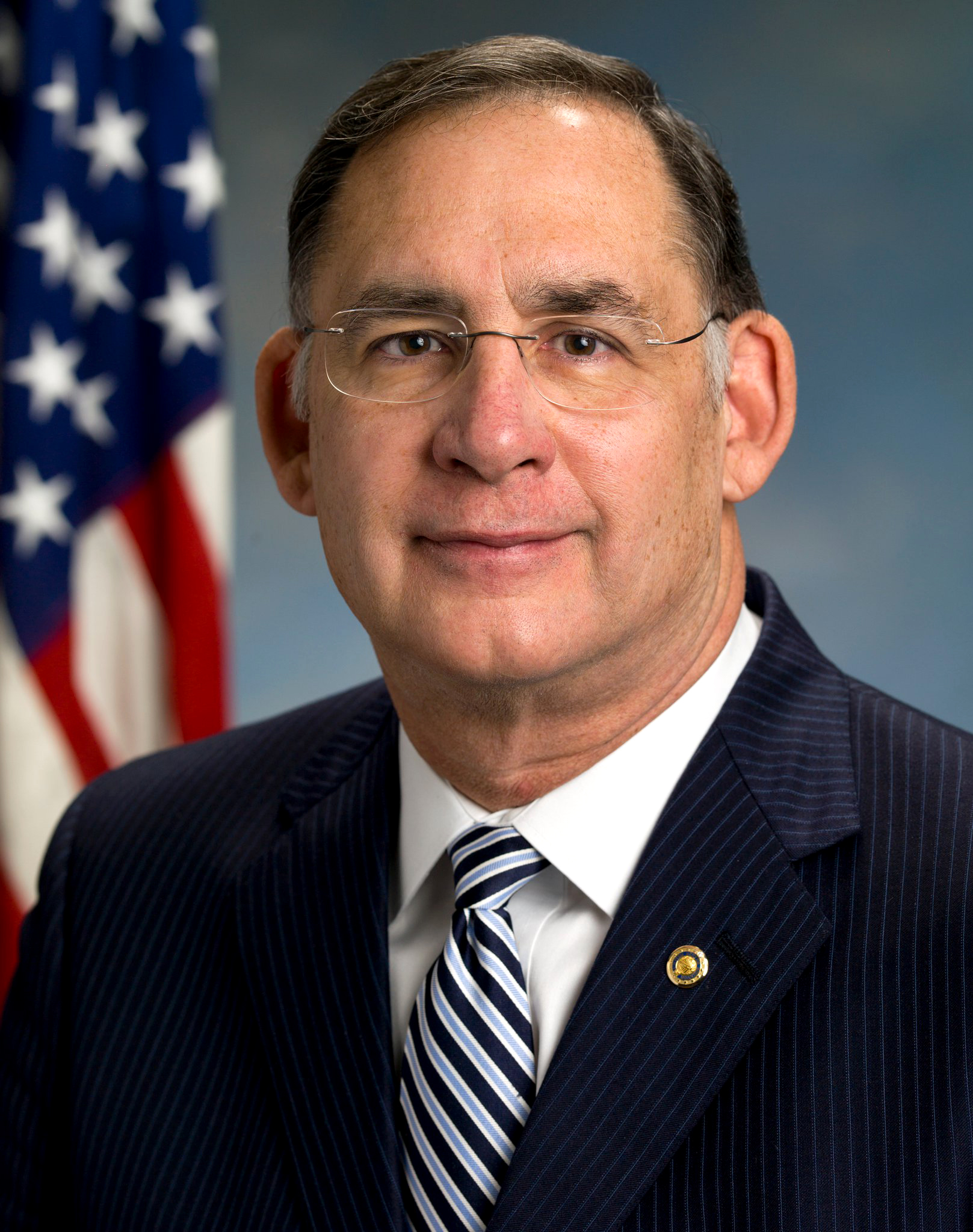

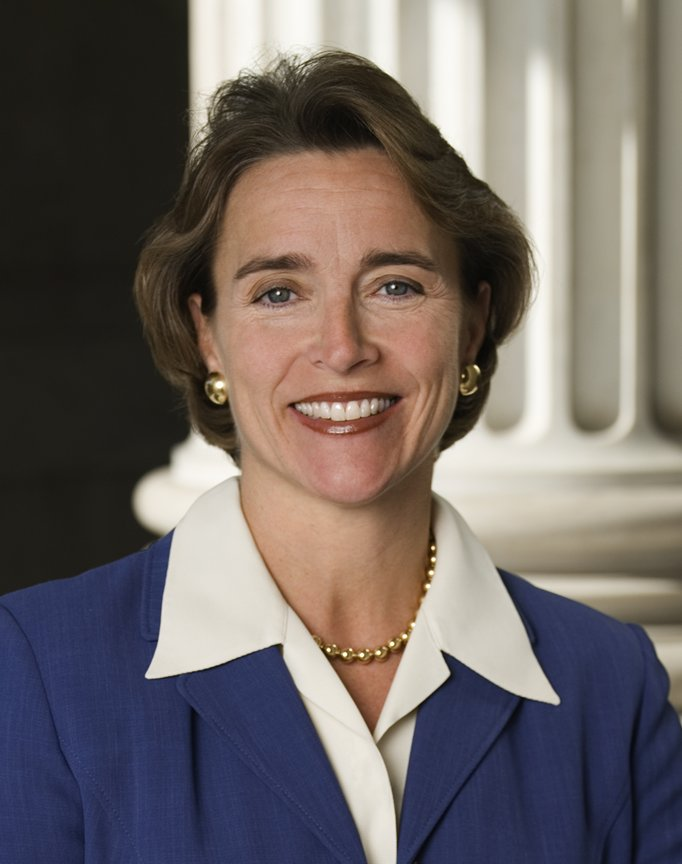
Nominee	John Boozman	Blanche Lincoln
Party	Republican	Democratic
Popular vote	451,617	288,156
Percentage	57.90%	36.95%
- Boozman: 40–50% 50–60% 60–70% 70–80% Lincoln: 40–50% 50–60% 60–70%
U.S. senator before election
Blanche Lincoln
Democratic
Elected U.S. Senator
John Boozman
Republican

Incumbent Democrat Blanche Lincoln ran for re-election to a third term, but lost to Republican nominee John Boozman. Boozman became the first Republican in 138 years to win the seat. Arkansas had previously only elected one Republican senator since the Reconstruction, who was defeated after his first term in 2002 by Mark Pryor.

Democratic primary election
Party	Candidate	Votes	%
Democratic	Blanche Lincoln (Incumbent)	146,579	44.5%
Democratic	Bill Halter	140,081	42.5%
Democratic	D.C. Morrison	42,695	13.0%
Total votes		329,355	100.0%

Democratic primary election runoff
Party	Candidate	Votes	%
Democratic	Blanche Lincoln (Incumbent)	134,758	52.0%
Democratic	Bill Halter	124,405	48.0%
Total votes		259,163	100.0%

The Republican primary was held May 18, 2010, with early voting from May 3–17.

Republican primary election
Party	Candidate	Votes	%
Republican	John Boozman	75,010	52.7%
Republican	Jim Holt	24,826	17.5%
Republican	Gilbert Baker	16,540	11.6%
Republican	Conrad Reynolds	7,128	5.0%
Republican	Curtis Coleman	6,928	4.9%
Republican	Kim Hendren	5,551	3.9%
Republican	Randy Alexander	4,389	3.1%
Republican	Fred Ramey	1,888	1.3%
Total votes		142,260	100.0%

2010 United States Senate election in Arkansas
Party	Candidate	Votes	%	±%
Republican	John Boozman	451,617	57.90%	+13.83%
Democratic	Blanche Lincoln (Incumbent)	288,156	36.95%	−18.95%
Libertarian	Trevor Drown	25,234	3.24%	+3.24%
Green	John Gray	14,430	1.85%	+1.85%
Majority		163,461	20.95%	
Total votes		779,437	100.00%	
Turnout				
Republican gain from Democratic		Swing		

== California ==
California election
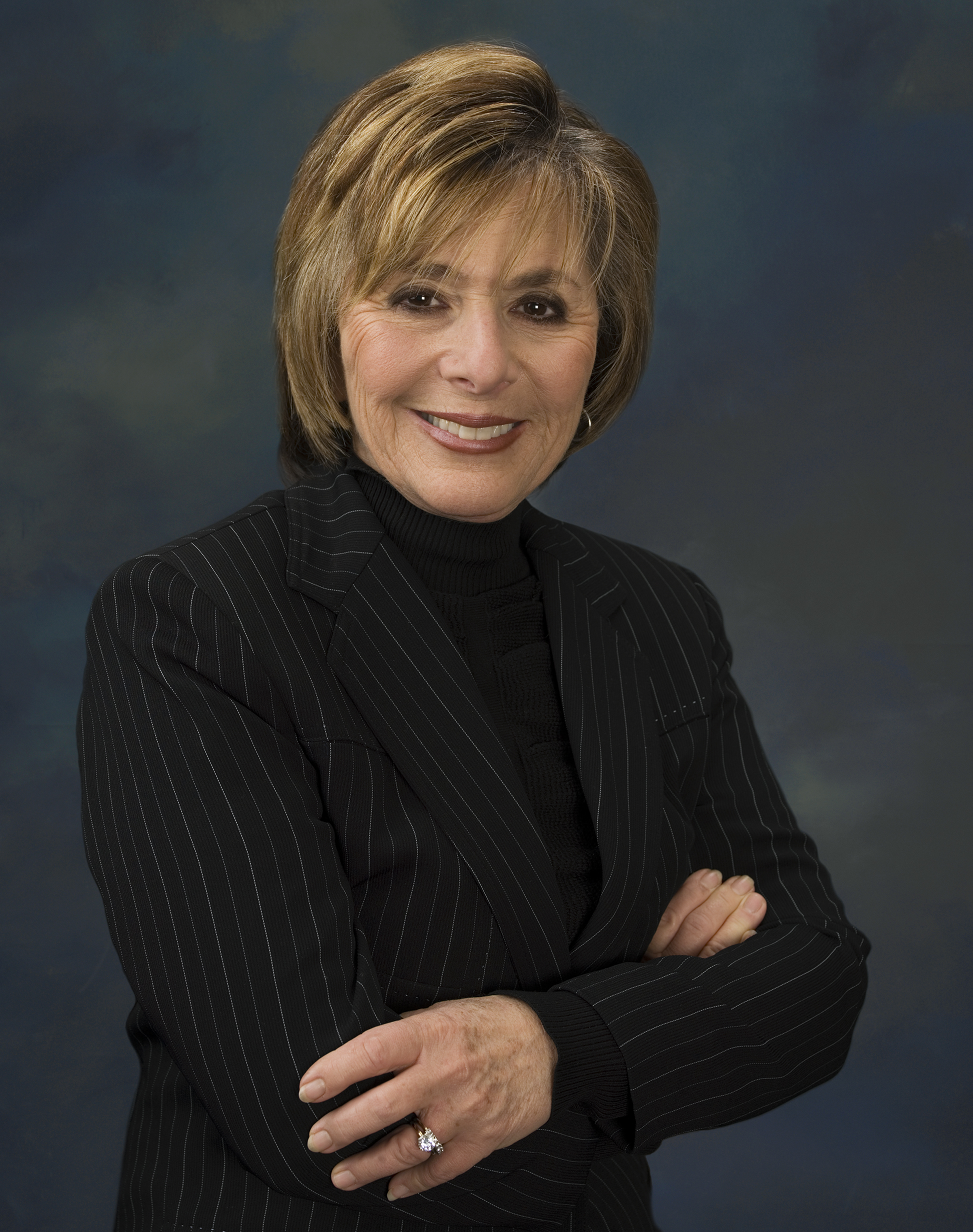

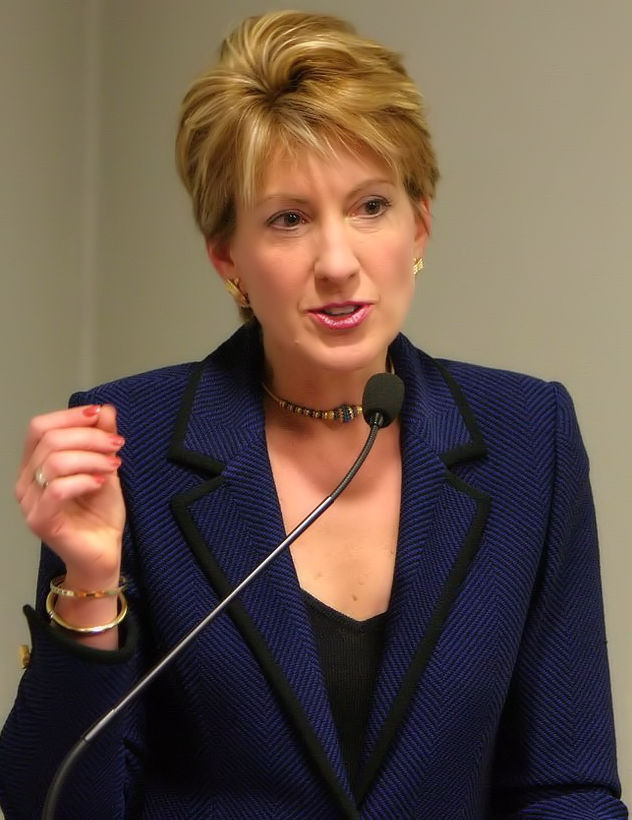
Nominee	Barbara Boxer	Carly Fiorina
Party	Democratic	Republican
Popular vote	5,218,441	4,217,366
Percentage	52.2%	42.2%
- County results Boxer: 40–50% 50–60% 60–70% 70–80% 80–90% Fiorina: 40–50% 50–60% 60–70% 70–80%
U.S. senator before election
Barbara Boxer
Democratic
Elected U.S. Senator
Barbara Boxer
Democratic

Incumbent Democrat Barbara Boxer won re-election to a fourth term.

In 2009, Boxer was criticized for correcting a general who called her "ma'am". Brigadier General Michael Walsh was testifying on the Louisiana coastal restoration process in the wake of Hurricane Katrina and answered Boxer's query with "ma'am" when Boxer interrupted him. "Do me a favor," Boxer said. "can you say 'senator' instead of 'ma'am?'" "Yes, ma'am," Walsh interjected. "It's just a thing, I worked so hard to get that title, so I'd appreciate it. Thank you," she said. The Army's guide to protocol instructs service members to call members of the U.S. Senate "sir", "ma'am" or "senator". Fiorina used this incident prominently in campaign ads, as did David Zucker, who directed a humorous commercial for RightChange.com titled 'Call Me Senator.' In February 2010, Carly Fiorina put out a campaign ad attacking Republican rival Tom Campbell featuring a "demon sheep", creating international, mostly negative, publicity.

California Democratic Senate primary, 2010
Candidate	Votes	%
Barbara Boxer (Incumbent)	1,957,920	81.0%
Brian Quintana	338,442	13.9%
Mickey Kaus	123,573	5.1%
Total votes	2,419,935	100.0%

California Republican Senate primary, 2010
Candidate	Votes	%
Carly Fiorina	1,315,429	56.4%
Tom Campbell	504,289	21.7%
Chuck DeVore	452,577	19.3%
Al Ramirez	42,149	1.8%
Tim Kalemkarian	19,598	0.8%
Total votes	2,334,042	100.0%

California general election
Party	Candidate	Votes	%
Democratic	Barbara Boxer (Incumbent)	5,218,441	52.2%
Republican	Carly Fiorina	4,217,366	42.2%
Libertarian	Gail Lightfoot	175,242	1.8%
Peace and Freedom	Marsha Feinland	135,093	1.4%
Green	Duane Roberts	128,510	1.2%
American Independent	Edward Noonan	125,441	1.2%
Write-ins		67	<0.1%
Total votes		10,000,160	100.0%

== Colorado ==
Colorado election
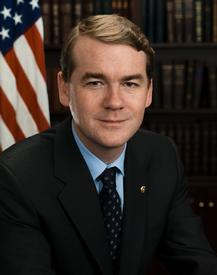

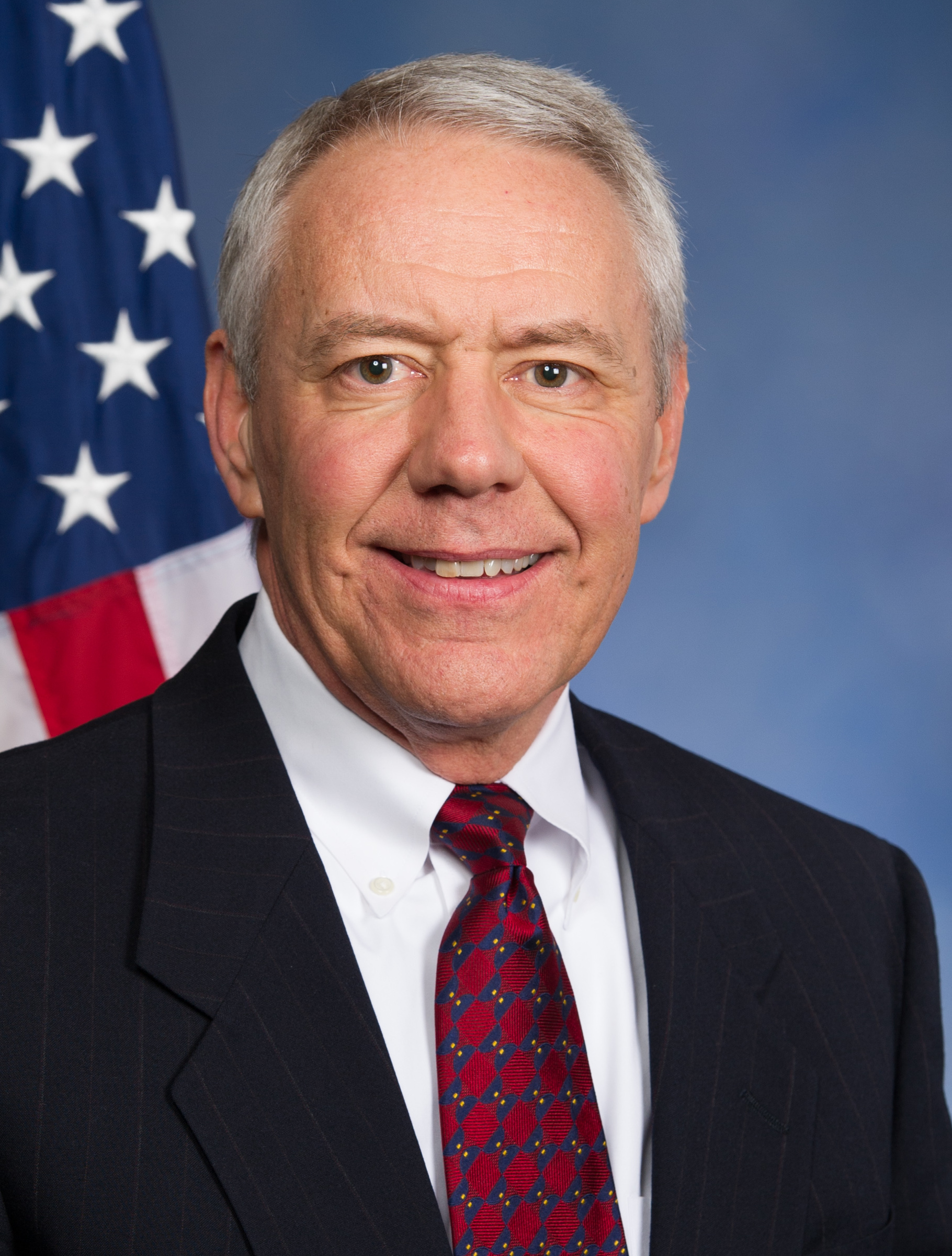
Nominee	Michael Bennet	Ken Buck
Party	Democratic	Republican
Popular vote	851,590	822,731
Percentage	48.1%	46.4%
- County results Bennet: 40–50% 50–60% 60–70% 70–80% Buck: 40–50% 50–60% 60–70% 70–80%
U.S. senator before election
Michael Bennet
Democratic
Elected U.S. Senator
Michael Bennet
Democratic

In December 2008, President-elect Barack Obama selected incumbent U.S. Senator Ken Salazar to become U.S. Secretary of the Interior. After Salazar resigned from his seat, Democratic Governor Bill Ritter appointed Denver Public Schools Superintendent Michael Bennet to fill the seat, who won election to his first full term.

Colorado Democratic primary election
Party	Candidate	Votes	%
Democratic	Michael Bennet (Incumbent)	183,225	54.2%
Democratic	Andrew Romanoff	154,961	45.8%
Total votes		338,186	100.00%

Colorado Republican primary election
Party	Candidate	Votes	%
Republican	Ken Buck	209,638	51.6%
Republican	Jane Norton	196,954	48.4%
Total votes		406,592	100.0%

This was one of the most expensive elections in the 2010 cycle, with more than $50 million spent total, including over $35 million in outside spending. Conservative third party groups hammered Bennet for voting 92% of the time with the Democratic leadership, including voting for healthcare reform and the stimulus package. Liberal third party groups called Buck extremist. Bennet focused on attacking Buck's views on abortion, which he believed should be banned including those of cases of rape and incest. He was also attacked for wanting to eliminate the Seventeenth Amendment and refusing to prosecute an alleged rapist as Weld County district attorney. Planned Parenthood mounted a mail campaign, targeting women voters with the warning that "Colorado women can't trust Ken Buck." Bennet won the women vote by 17 points according to exit polls. After the election, Buck conceded to the Denver Post that the main reason why he lost is because of social issues.

2010 United States Senate election in Colorado
Party	Candidate	Votes	%
Democratic	Michael Bennet (Incumbent)	851,590	48.1%
Republican	Ken Buck	822,731	46.4%
Green	Bob Kinsey	38,768	2.2%
Libertarian	Maclyn Stringer	22,589	1.3%
Independent	Jason Napolitano	19,415	1.1%
Independent	Charley Miller	11,330	0.6%
Independent	J. Moromisato	5,767	0.3%
Total votes		1,772,190	100.0%
Turnout			N/A

== Connecticut ==
Connecticut election
- Turnout: 45.9% (voting eligible)
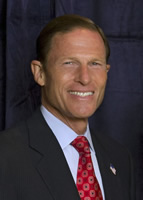

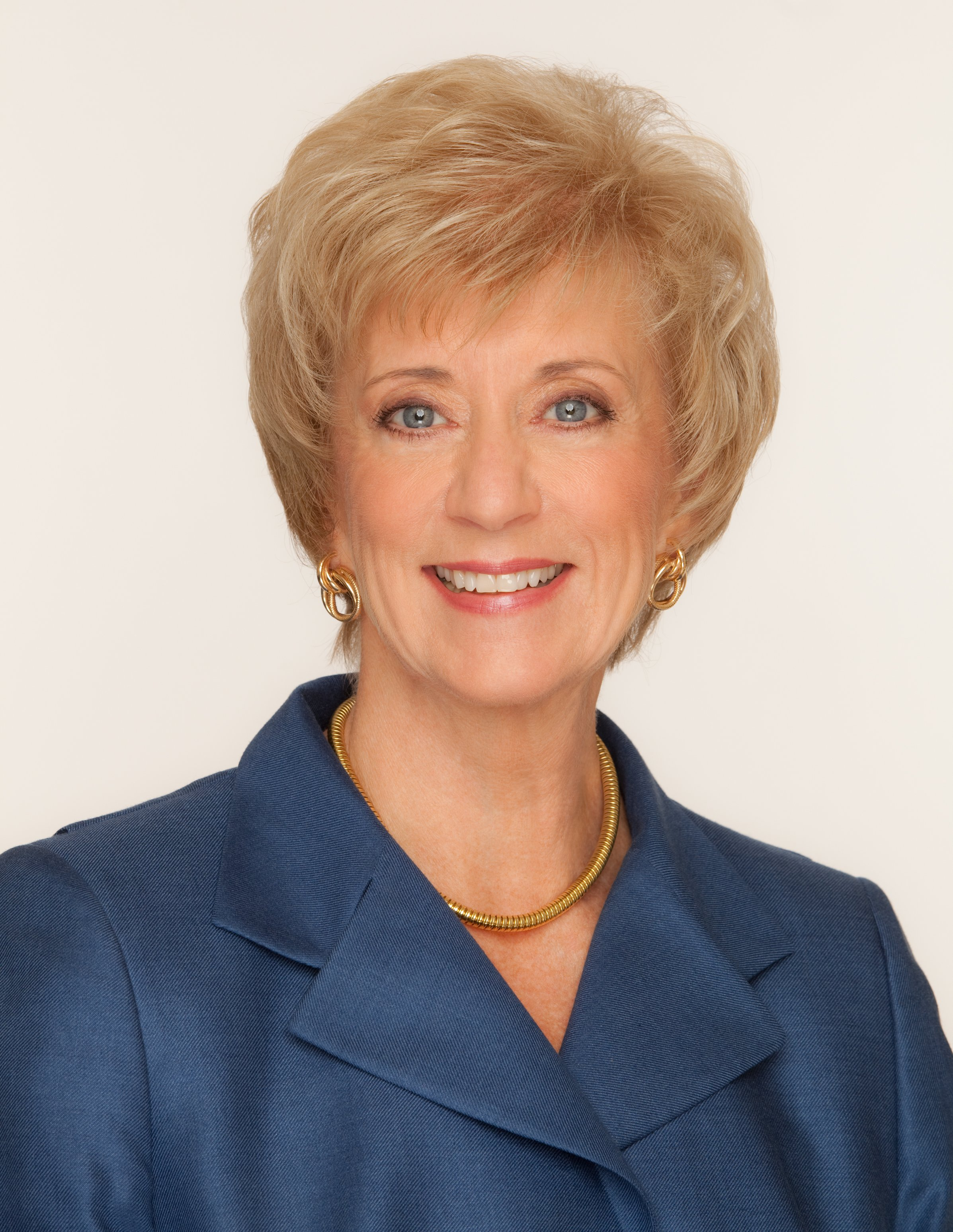
Nominee	Richard Blumenthal	Linda McMahon
Party	Democratic	Republican
Popular vote	636,040	498,341
Percentage	55.2%	43.2%
- Blumenthal: 40–50% 50–60% 60–70% 70–80% 80–90% McMahon: 40–50% 50–60% 60–70%
U.S. senator before election
Chris Dodd
Democratic
Elected U.S. Senator
Richard Blumenthal
Democratic

Incumbent Democrat Christopher Dodd suffered from dropping approval ratings in the past few years due to major controversies, leading him to announce in January 2010 that he would retire, instead of seeking a sixth term. As Dodd was a Democrat, Richard Blumenthal, incumbent State Attorney General, announced on the same day that he would run for Dodd's seat. The Connecticut Democratic Party nominated Blumenthal on May 21. Businesswoman Linda McMahon won the state party's nominating convention and the August 10 Republican primary to become the Republican candidate.

Republican primary election
Party	Candidate	Votes	%
Republican	Linda McMahon	60,479	49.44%
Republican	Rob Simmons	34,011	27.80%
Republican	Peter Schiff	27,831	22.75%
Total votes		122,321	100.00%

2010 United States Senate election in Connecticut
Party	Candidate	Votes	%	±%
Democratic	Richard Blumenthal	636,040	55.16%	−11.20%
Republican	Linda E. McMahon	498,341	43.22%	+11.08%
Independent	Warren B. Mosler	11,275	0.98%	N/A
Connecticut for Lieberman	Dr. John Mertens	6,735	0.58%	N/A
Write-In	Write-in candidates (8)	724	0.06%	N/A
Majority		137,755	11.95%	
Total votes		1,153,115	100.00%	
Democratic hold				

Note: Blumenthal also appeared on the line of the Connecticut Working Families Party and received 30,836 votes on it. His Working Families and Democratic votes have been aggregated together on this table.

== Delaware (special) ==
Delaware special election
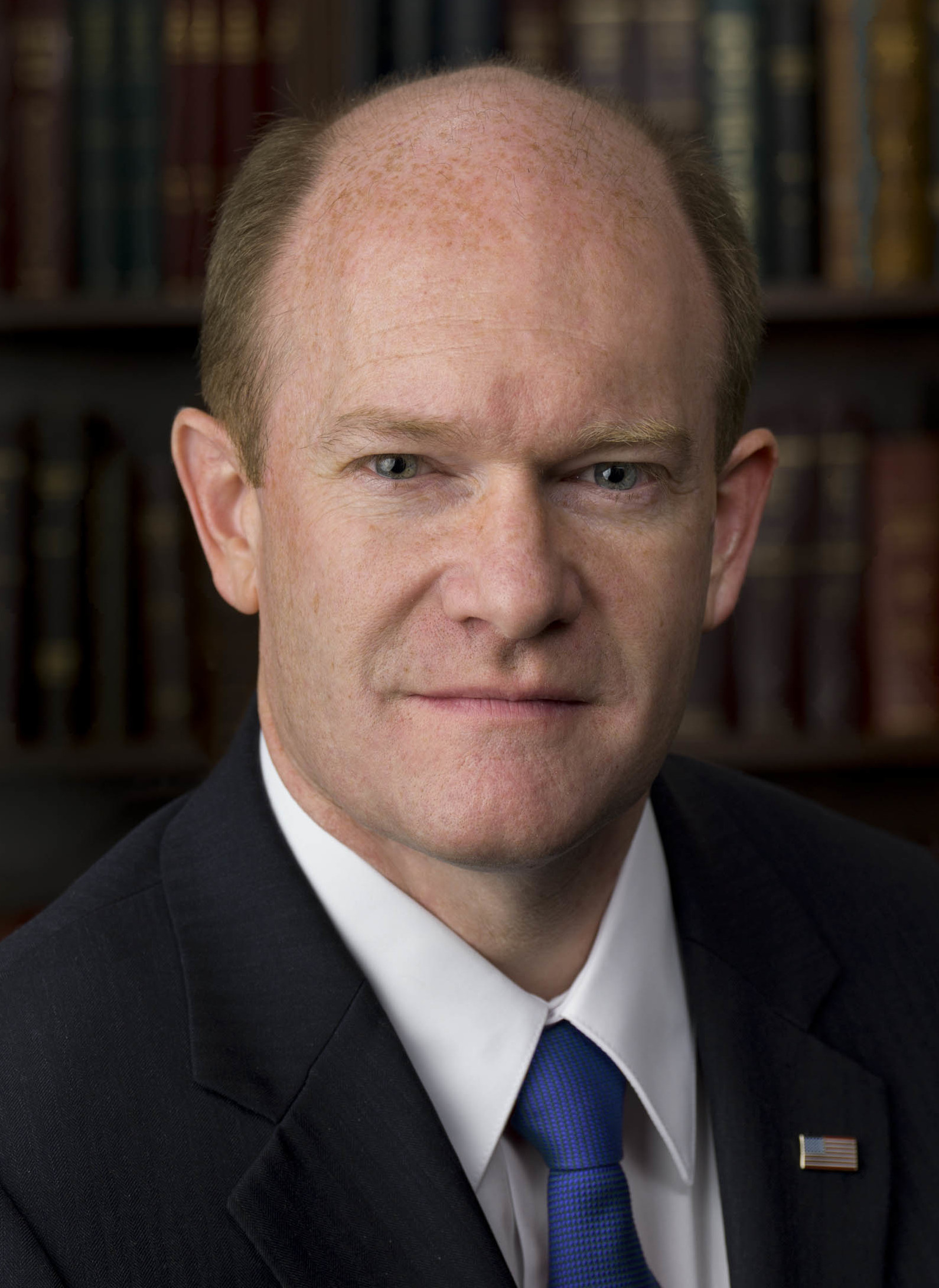

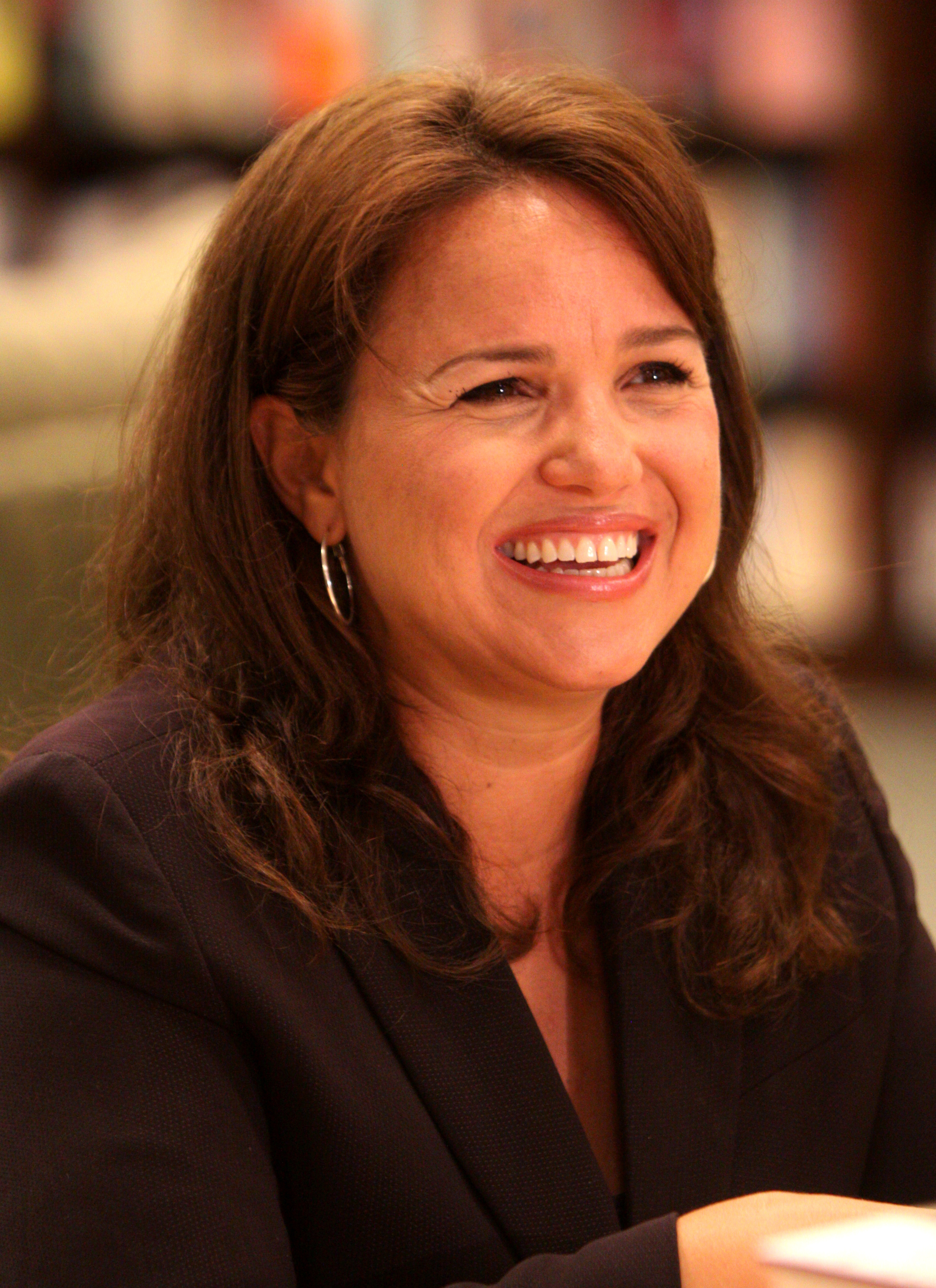
Nominee	Chris Coons	Christine O'Donnell
Party	Democratic	Republican
Popular vote	174,012	123,053
Percentage	56.6%	40.0%
- County results Coons: 60–70% O'Donnell: 50–60%
U.S. senator before election
Ted Kaufman
Democratic
Elected U.S. Senator
Chris Coons
Democratic

This was a special election to fill Delaware's Class 2 Senate seat, then held by Ted Kaufman, an appointee. The seat had been previously held by long-time Senator Joe Biden, who vacated it when he became Vice President of the United States in 2009.

Delaware Republican primary election
Party	Candidate	Votes	%
Republican	Christine O'Donnell	30,561	53.1%
Republican	Michael N. Castle	27,021	46.9%
Total votes		57,582	100.0%

2010 United States Senate special election in Delaware
Party	Candidate	Votes	%	±%
Democratic	Chris Coons	174,012	56.61%	−8.07%
Republican	Christine O'Donnell	123,053	40.03%	+4.72%
Independent Party	Glenn Miller	8,201	2.67%	
Libertarian	James Rash	2,101	0.69%	
Majority		50,959	16.58%	−12.79%
Total votes		307,367	100.00%	
Democratic hold		Swing		

== Florida ==
Florida election
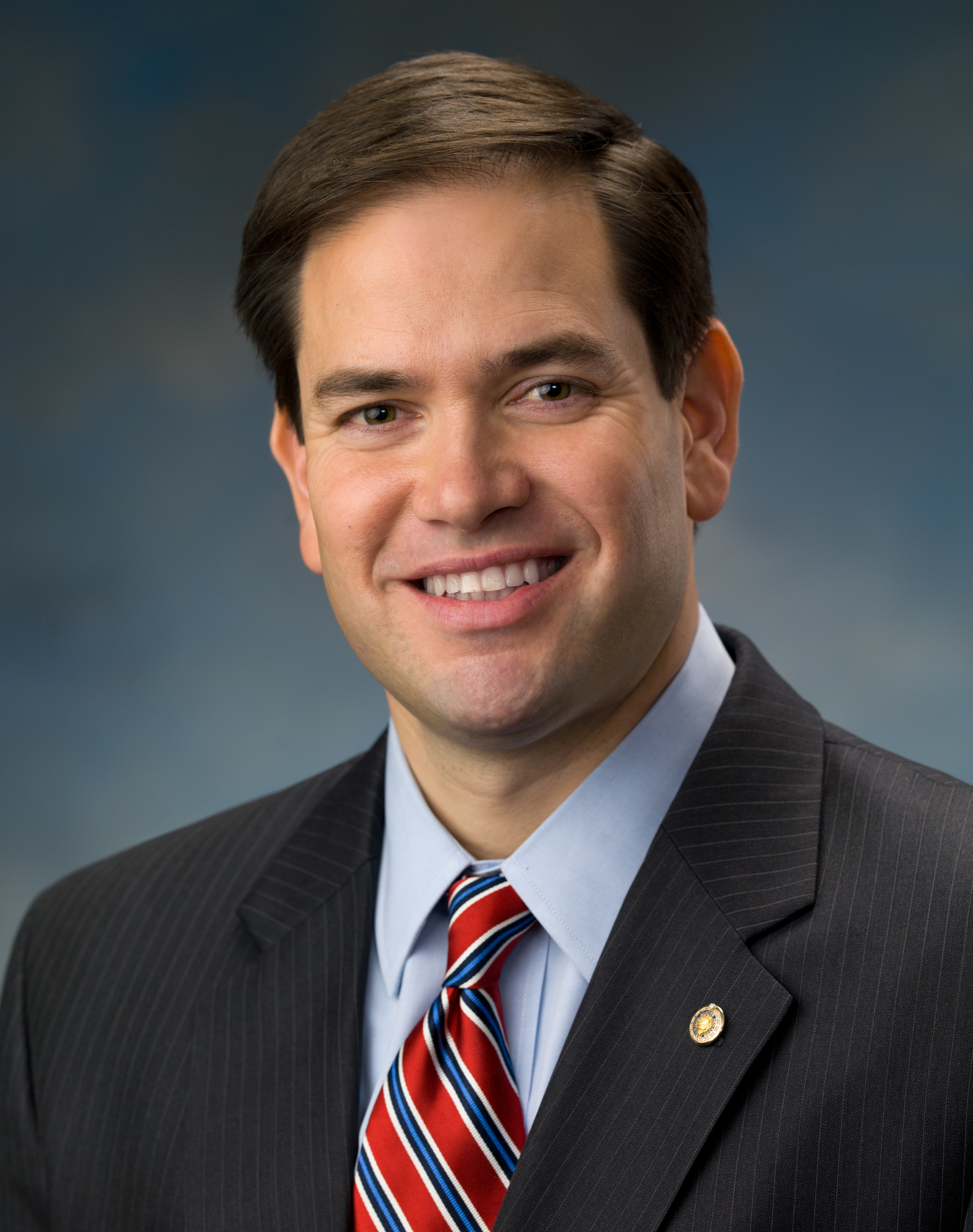

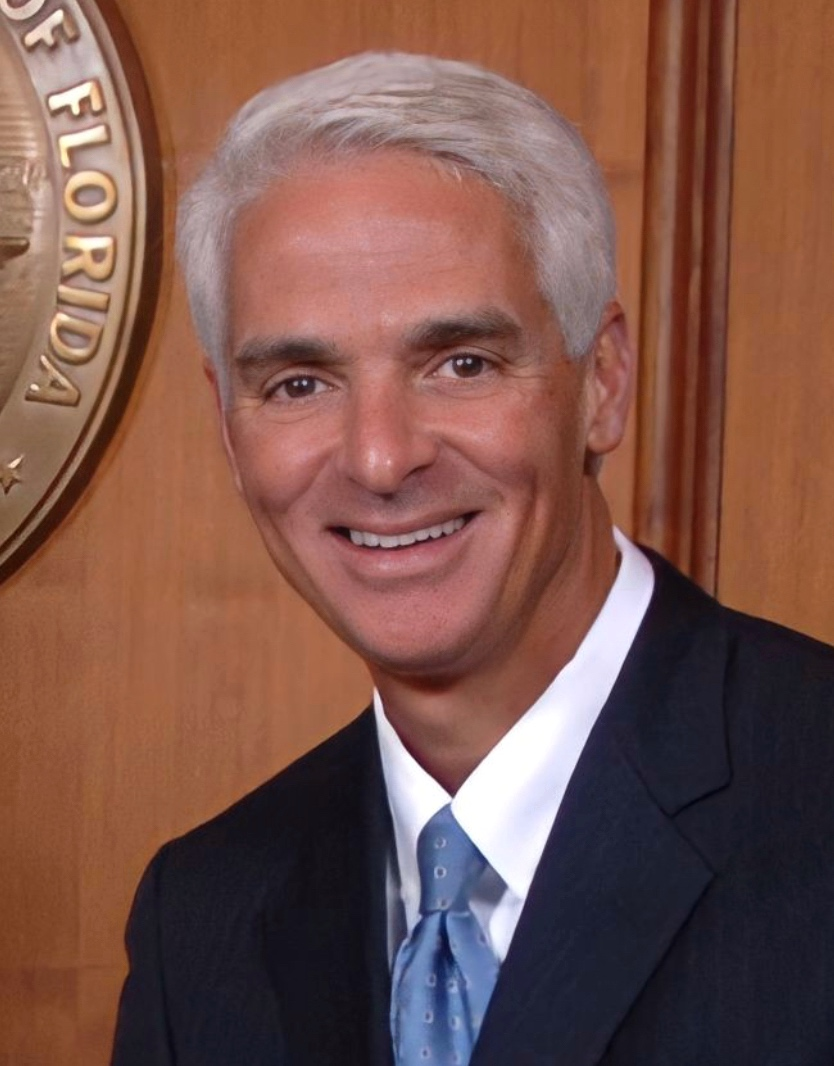

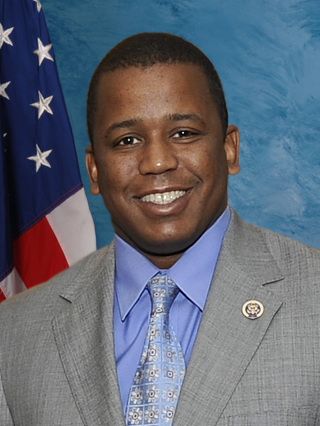
Nominee	Marco Rubio	Charlie Crist	Kendrick Meek
Party	Republican	Independent	Democratic
Popular vote	2,645,743	1,607,549	1,092,936
Percentage	48.9%	29.7%	20.2%
- Rubio: 30–40% 40–50% 50–60% 60–70% 70–80% Crist: 30–40% 40–50% Meek: 40–50% 50–60% 60–70%
U.S. senator before election
George LeMieux
Republican
Elected U.S. Senator
Marco Rubio
Republican

Incumbent Republican Senator Mel Martínez, who was elected in a very close race against Democrat Betty Castor with 49% of the vote in 2004, announced on December 2, 2008, that he would not run for re-election to a second term, then announcing on August 7, 2009, that he would resign prior to the end of his term. The Governor of Florida, Republican Charlie Crist, was required to appoint a successor and he chose his former Chief of Staff, George LeMieux. LeMieux, a placeholder who did not run in the election, replaced Martínez in the Senate on September 10, 2009.

Crist publicly announced he was running for the seat in mid-2009. When he declared his candidacy, he received many Republican endorsements, including the National Republican Senatorial Committee, Martínez, and 2008 Republican presidential nominee John McCain. However, his support of the American Recovery and Reinvestment Act of 2009 hurt his popularity among conservatives, and Tea Party candidate Marco Rubio, the former Speaker of the Florida House of Representatives, surged in the polls. In April 2010, Crist announced he would drop out of the Republican primary and run as an independent. The National Republican Senatorial Committee withdrew its endorsement of Crist and demanded a refund of its campaign funds that it provided for the Crist campaign. Rubio went on to win the Republican primary against only token opposition.

Polling initially showed Crist neck and neck with Rubio, but by the end of August Rubio opened up a solid and consistent lead. He was supported by Republican and some Independent voters whereas Democratic and other Independents were split between Crist and Meek. Rubio went on to win the election with 49% of the vote to Crist's 30% and Meek's 20%.

Republican primary election
Party	Candidate	Votes	%
Republican	Marco Rubio	1,059,513	84.6%
Republican	William Kogut	111,584	8.9%
Republican	William Escoffery	81,873	6.5%
Total votes		1,252,970	100.0%

Democratic primary election
Party	Candidate	Votes	%
Democratic	Kendrick Meek	522,942	57.4%
Democratic	Jeff Greene	283,370	31.1%
Democratic	Glenn Burkett	59,575	6.5%
Democratic	Maurice Ferré	44,506	4.9%
Total votes		910,393	100.0%

2010 United States Senate election in Florida
Party	Candidate	Votes	%	±%
Republican	Marco Antonio Rubio	2,645,743	48.89%	−0.54%
Independent	Charles Joseph Crist Jr.	1,607,549	29.71%	+29.71%
Democratic	Kendrick Brett Meek	1,092,936	20.20%	−28.12%
Libertarian	Alexander Snitker	24,850	0.46%	N/A
Independent	Sue Askeland	15,340	0.28%	N/A
Independent	Rick Tyler	7,394	0.14%	N/A
Constitution	Bernie DeCastro	4,792	0.09%	N/A
Independent	Lewis Jerome Armstrong	4,443	0.08%	N/A
Independent	Bobbie Bean	4,301	0.08%	N/A
Independent	Bruce Riggs	3,647	0.07%	N/A
Write-ins		108	0.00%	
Majority		1,038,194	19.19%	+18.08%
Turnout		5,411,106	48.25%	−22.67%
Total votes		5,411,106	100.00%	
Republican hold		Swing		

== Georgia ==
Georgia election
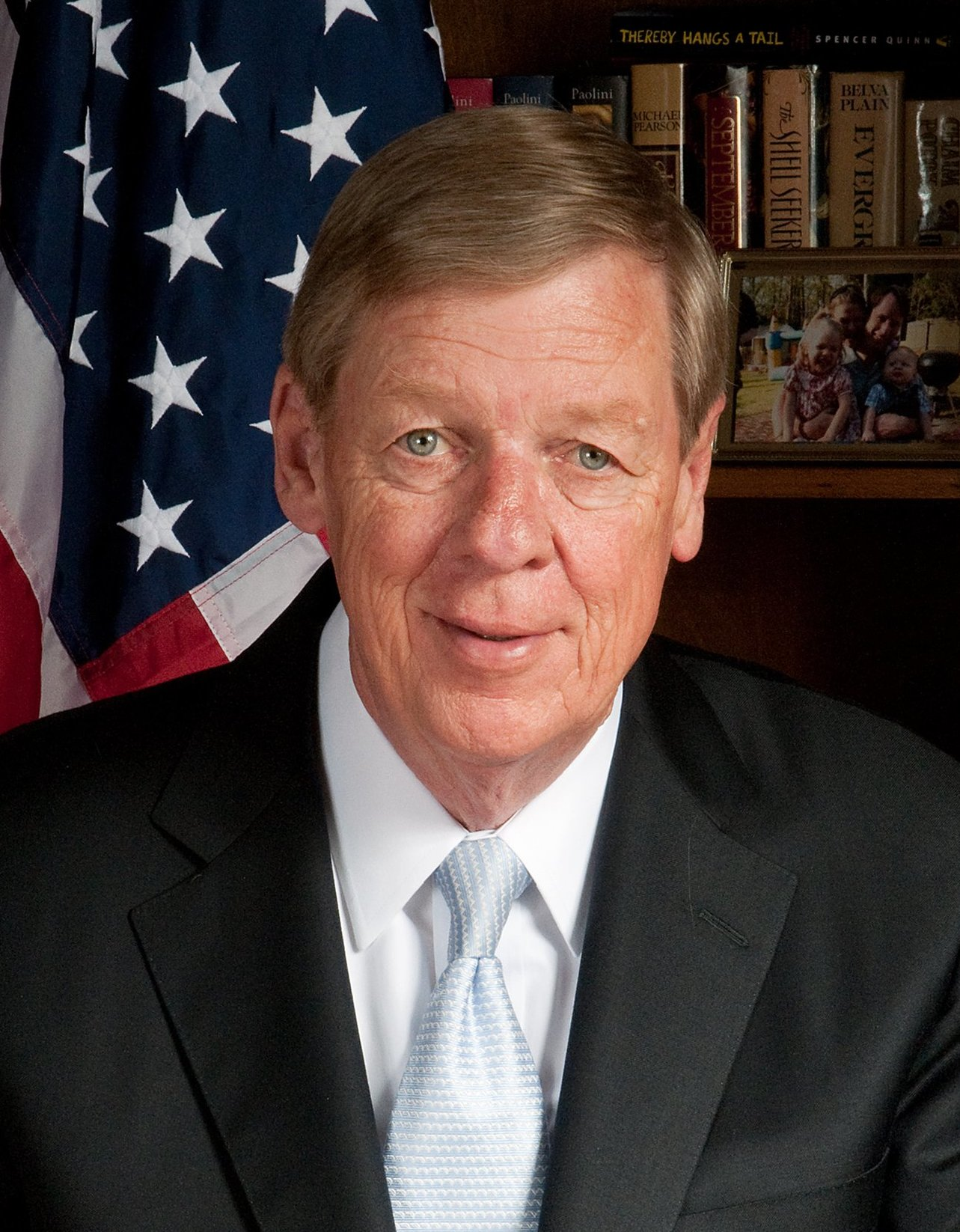

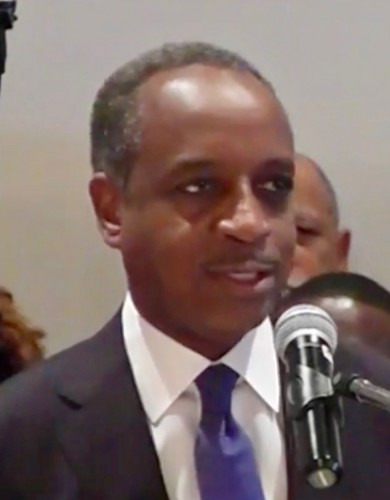
Nominee	Johnny Isakson	Mike Thurmond
Party	Republican	Democratic
Popular vote	1,489,904	996,516
Percentage	58.3%	39.0%
- Isakson: 40–50% 50–60% 60–70% 70–80% 80–90% Thurmond: 40–50% 50–60% 60–70% 70–80%
U.S. senator before election
Johnny Isakson
Republican
Elected U.S. Senator
Johnny Isakson
Republican

Incumbent Republican Johnny Isakson won re-election to a second term.

Democratic primary election
Party	Candidate	Votes	%
Democratic	Michael Thurmond	297,226	84.3%
Democratic	RJ Hadley	55,159	15.7%
Total votes		352,385	100.0%

Republican primary election
Party	Candidate	Votes	%
Republican	Johnny Isakson	558,298	100.00%
Total votes		558,298	100.00%

2010 United States Senate election in Georgia
Party	Candidate	Votes	%	±%
Republican	Johnny Isakson (Incumbent)	1,489,904	58.31%	+0.43%
Democratic	Michael Thurmond	996,516	39.00%	−0.98%
Libertarian	Chuck Donovan	68,750	2.69%	+0.55%
Independent	Steve Davis (write-in)	52	0.00%	N/A
Independent	Raymond Beckworth (write-in)	24	0.00%	N/A
Independent	Brian Russell Brown (write-in)	12	0.00%	N/A
Majority		493,388	19.31%	
Total votes		2,555,258	100.00%	
Republican hold		Swing		

== Hawaii ==
Hawaii election
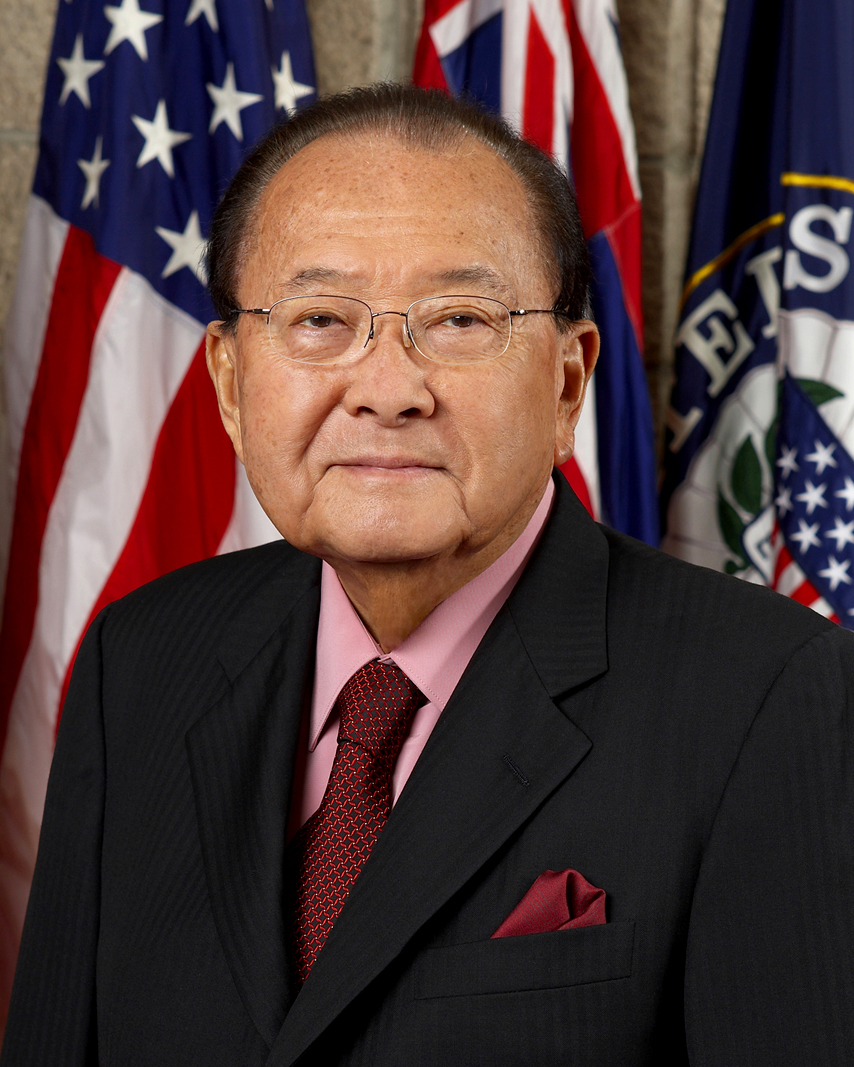

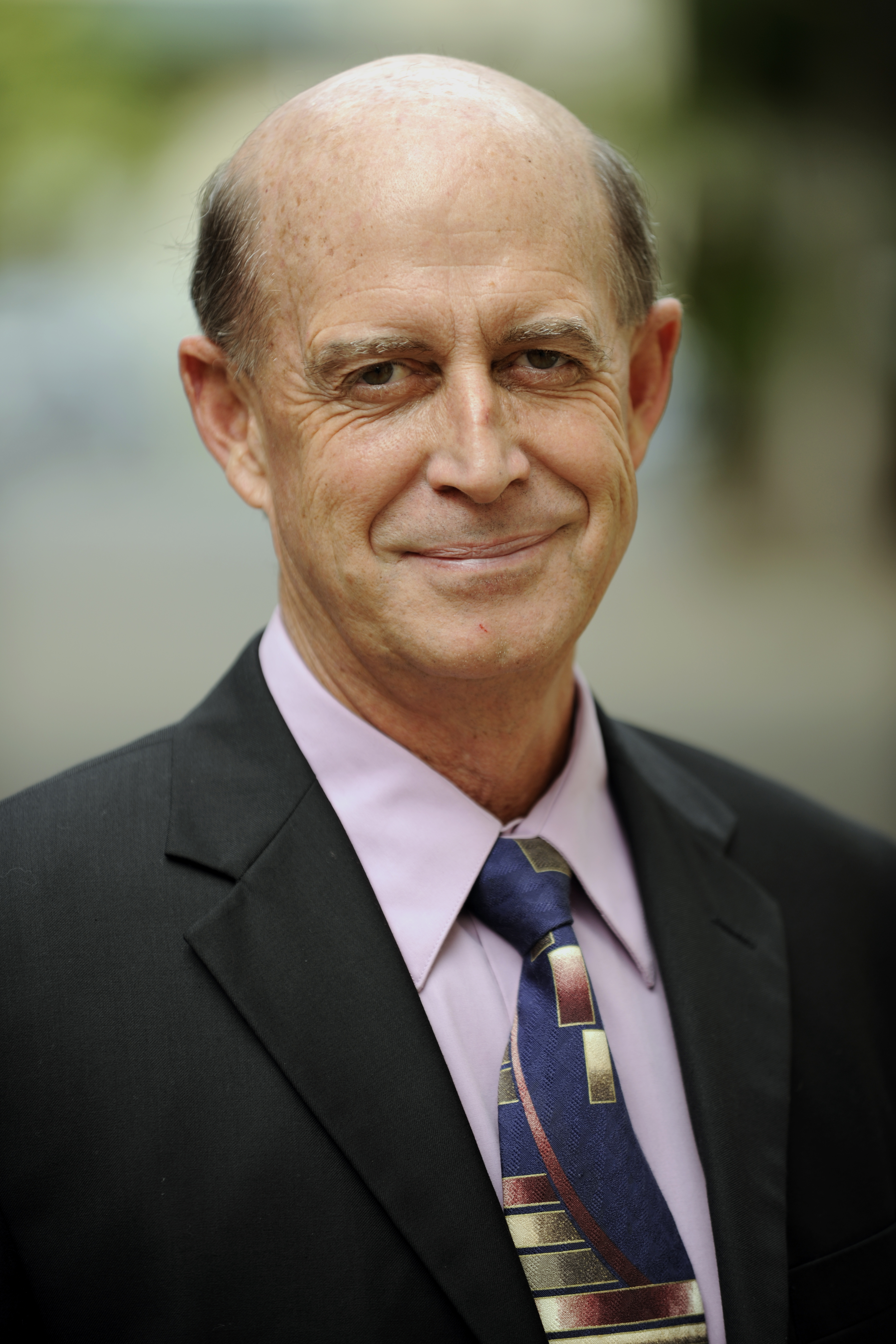
Nominee	Daniel Inouye	Cam Cavasso
Party	Democratic	Republican
Popular vote	277,228	79,939
Percentage	74.8%	21.6%
- County results Inouye: 70–80%
U.S. senator before election
Daniel Inouye
Democratic
Elected U.S. Senator
Daniel Inouye
Democratic

Incumbent Democrat and President pro tempore Daniel Inouye won re-election to his ninth term.

Hawaii last elected a Republican Senator in 1970, and its current delegation to the United States Congress currently consists entirely of Democrats. Democrats have also won Hawaii's electoral votes in every presidential election since Ronald Reagan's landslide election in 1984. The exceptions at the time were then-Governor Linda Lingle (who was serving her second and final term) and then-U.S. Representative Charles Djou, both of whom were Republicans.

Democratic primary election
Party	Candidate	Votes	%
Democratic	Daniel Inouye (Incumbent)	188,400	88.3%
Democratic	Andy Woerner	25,016	11.7%
Total votes		213,416	100.0%

Republican primary election
Party	Candidate	Votes	%
Republican	Campbell Cavasso	21,865	66.7%
Republican	John Roco	7,190	21.9%
Republican	Eddie Pirkowski	3,744	11.4%
Total votes		32,790	100.0%

2010 United States Senate election in Hawaii
Party	Candidate	Votes	%	±%
Democratic	Daniel Inouye (Incumbent)	277,228	74.81%	−0.70%
Republican	Cam Cavasso	79,939	21.57%	+0.58%
Green	Jim Brewer	7,762	2.09%	N/A
Libertarian	Lloyd Jeffrey Mallen	2,957	0.80%	−0.47%
Independent	Jeff Jarrett	2,697	0.73%	N/A
Majority		197,289	53.24%	
Total votes		370,583	100.00%	
Democratic hold		Swing		

== Idaho ==
Idaho election
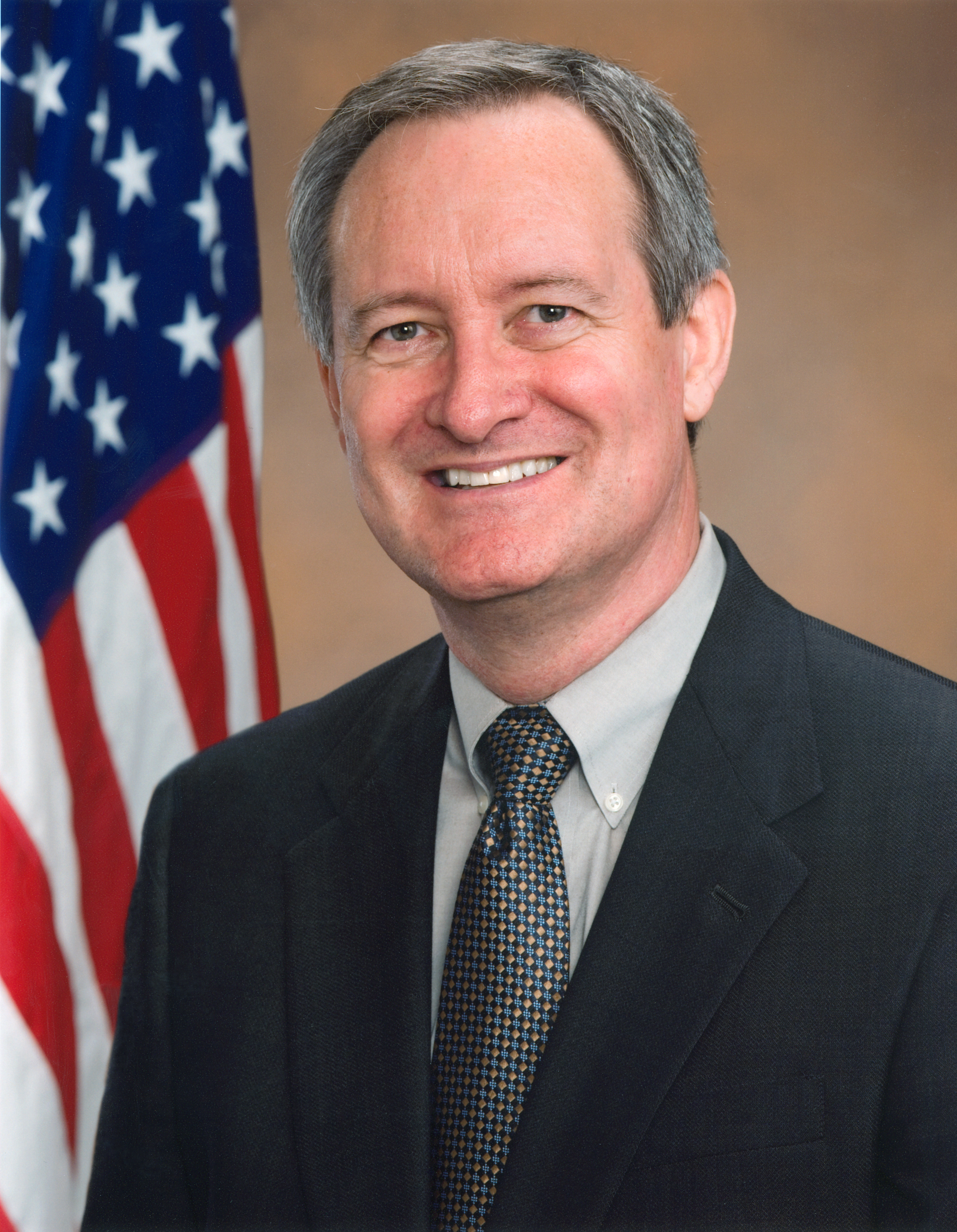

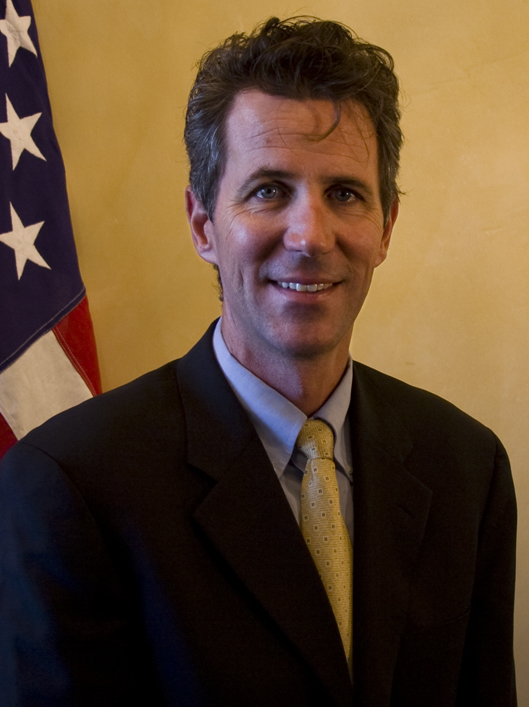
Nominee	Mike Crapo	Tom Sullivan
Party	Republican	Democratic
Popular vote	319,953	112,057
Percentage	71.2%	24.9%
- County results Crapo: 40–50% 50–60% 60–70% 70–80% 80–90%
U.S. senator before election
Mike Crapo
Republican
Elected U.S. Senator
Mike Crapo
Republican

Incumbent Republican Mike Crapo won re-election to a third term.

Idaho Republican primary election
Party	Candidate	Votes	%
Republican	Mike Crapo (Incumbent)	127,332	79.3%
Republican	Claude "Skip" Davis	33,150	20.7%
Total votes		160,482	100.0%

Idaho Democratic primary election
Party	Candidate	Votes	%
Democratic	Tom Sullivan	18,340	74.7%
Democratic	William Bryk	6,227	25.3%
Total votes		24,567	100.0%

Sullivan, a heavy underdog, criticized Crapo for being in Washington for too long saying "Senator Crapo has been in Congress for 18 years. The country is struggling, and I think it's time to make a change." Crapo emphasized his conservative record in Washington.

2010 United States Senate election in Idaho
Party	Candidate	Votes	%	±%
Republican	Michael Crapo (Incumbent)	319,953	71.19%	−27.99%
Democratic	Tom Sullivan	112,057	24.93%	N/A
Constitution	Randy Bergquist	17,429	3.88%	N/A
Majority		207,896	46.26%	
Total votes		449,439	100.00%	
Republican hold		Swing		

== Illinois ==
Illinois election
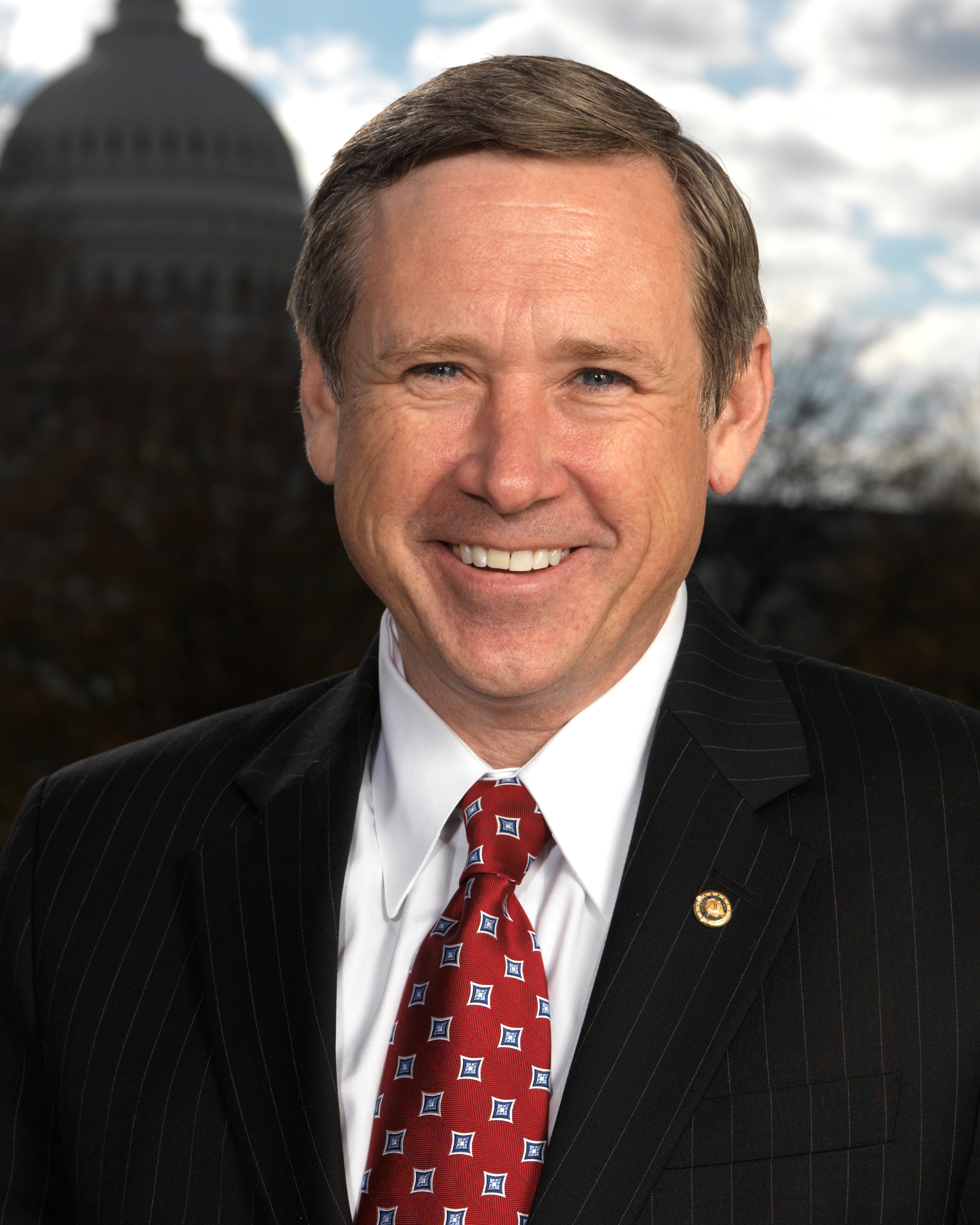

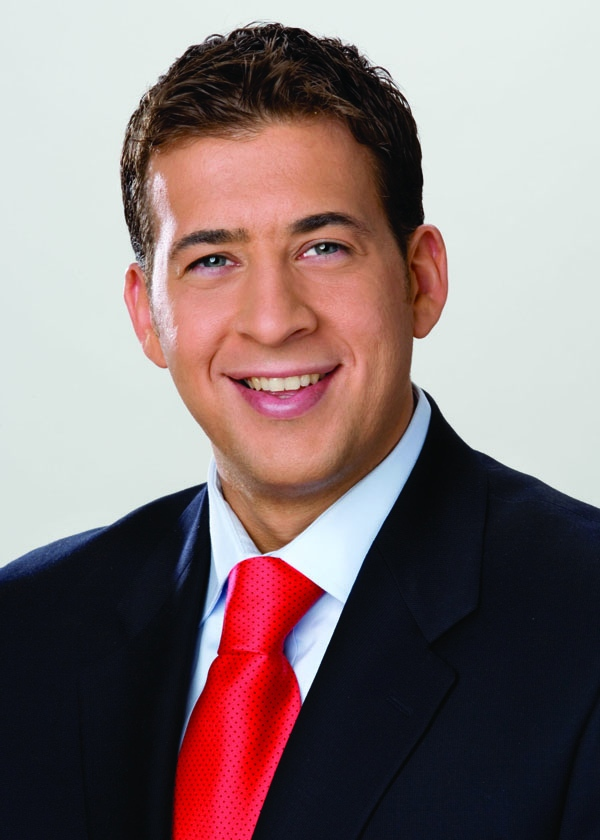
Nominee	Mark Kirk	Alexi Giannoulias
Party	Republican	Democratic
Special election	1,677,729; 47.3%	1,641,486; 46.3%
Regular election	1,778,698; 48.0%	1,719,478; 46.4%
- Kirk: 40–50% 50–60% 60–70% 70–80% Giannoulias: 40–50% 50–60% 60–70%
U.S. senator before election
Roland Burris
Democratic
Elected U.S. Senator
Mark Kirk
Republican

Incumbent Democrat Roland Burris did not run in 2010. He suffered from poor approval ratings and was investigated by the Sangamon County, Illinois State's Attorney for perjury. Although no criminal charges were filed against him, he faced an investigation by the Senate Ethics Committee.

There were two ballot items for the same seat: a regular election, to fill the Class 3 seat beginning with the 112th United States Congress beginning on January 3, 2011, and a special election, to fill that seat for the final weeks of the 111th Congress, replacing the temporary appointment of Roland Burris to the vacancy created by Barack Obama's election to the presidency.

A federal court ruled that the candidates appearing on the ballot for the replacement election would be the ones of the regular election, and that the special election would appear after the regular election on the ballot.

As of 2026, this was the last Senate election in Illinois won by a Republican.

Democratic primary election (February 2, 2010)
Party	Candidate	Votes	%
Democratic	Alexi Giannoulias	351,120	38.9%
Democratic	David Hoffman	303,719	33.7%
Democratic	Cheryle Jackson	178,941	19.8%
Democratic	Robert Marshall	51,606	5.7%
Democratic	Jacob Meister	16,232	1.8%
Total votes		901,618	100.0%

Illinois Republican primary election (February 2, 2010)
Party	Candidate	Votes	%
Republican	Mark Kirk	420,373	56.6%
Republican	Patrick Hughes	142,928	19.3%
Republican	Donald Lowery	66,357	8.9%
Republican	Kathleen Thomas	54,038	7.3%
Republican	Andy Martin	37,480	5.0%
Republican	John Arrington	21,090	2.8%
Republican	Patricia Beard	2	.0003%
Total votes		742,268	100.0%

Illinois special election
Party	Candidate	Votes	%
Republican	Mark Kirk	1,677,729	47.3%
Democratic	Alexi Giannoulias	1,641,486	46.3%
Green	LeAlan Jones	129,571	3.7%
Libertarian	Michael Labno	95,762	2.7%
Write-in	Lowell Martin Seida	4	0.0001%
Total votes		3,545,984	100.00%

Illinois regular election
Party	Candidate	Votes	%	±%
Republican	Mark Kirk	1,778,698	48.0%	+21.0%
Democratic	Alexi Giannoulias	1,719,478	46.4%	−25.6%
Green	LeAlan Jones	117,914	3.2%	N/A
Libertarian	Michael Labno	87,247	2.4%	+1.1%
Write-in	Lowell Martin Seida	4	0.0001%	N/A
Write-ins		1,136	<0.1%	N/A
Majority		59,220	1.6%	−51.4%
Turnout		3,704,473		−27.9%
Republican gain from Democratic		Swing		

== Indiana ==
Indiana election
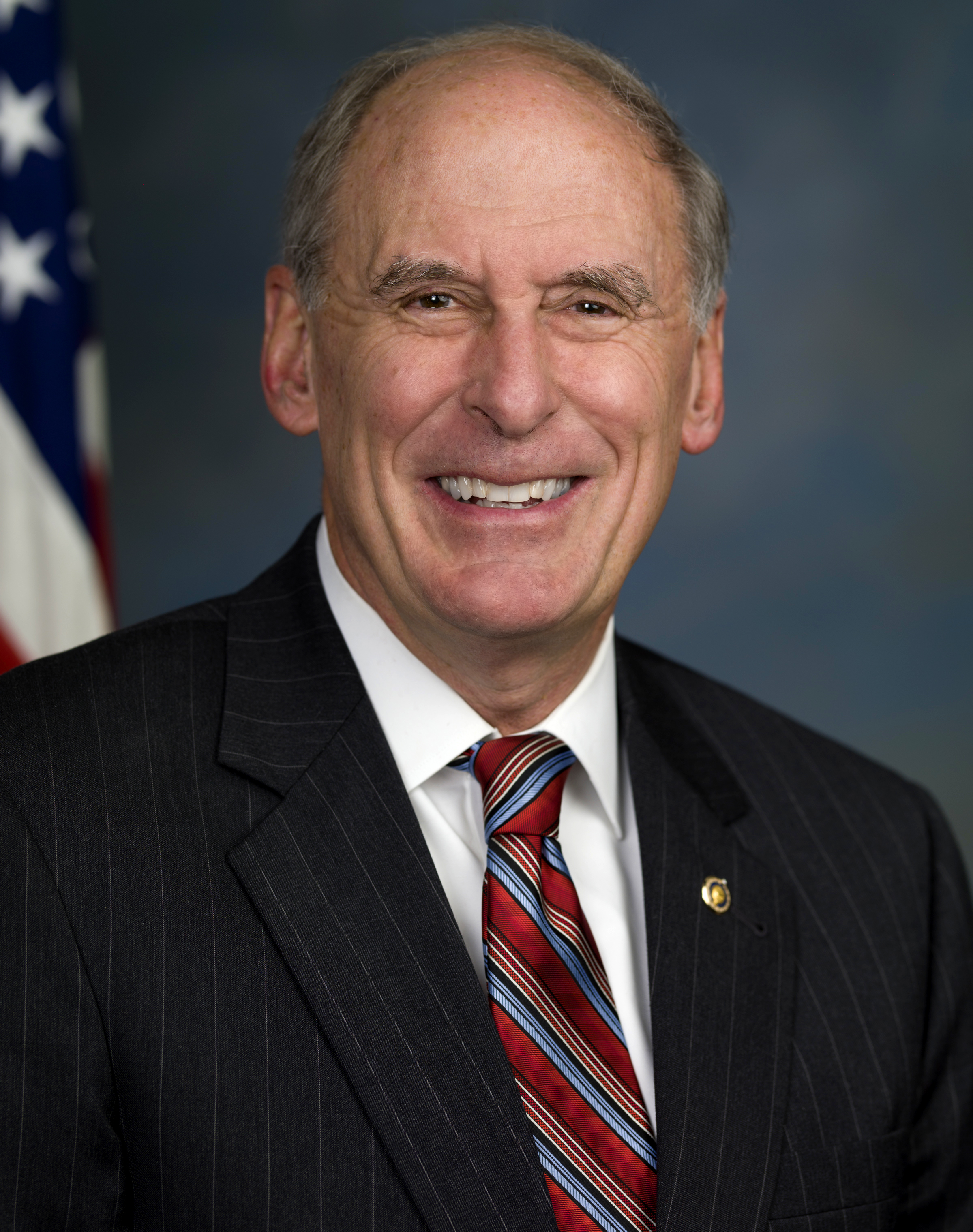

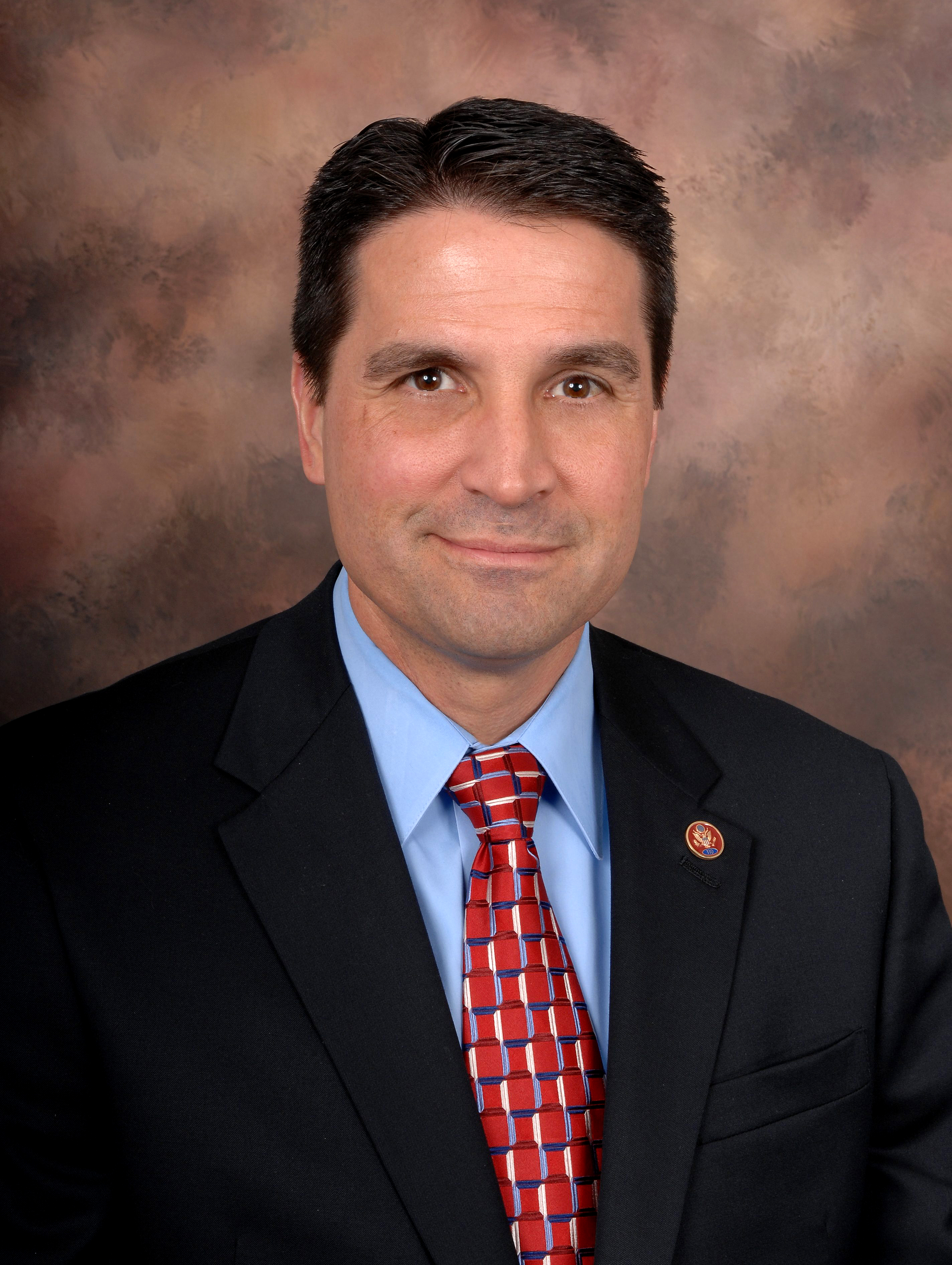
Nominee	Dan Coats	Brad Ellsworth
Party	Republican	Democratic
Popular vote	952,116	697,775
Percentage	54.6%	40.0%
Nominee	Rebecca Sink-Burris
Party	Libertarian
Popular vote	94,330
Percentage	5.4%
- County results Coats: 40–50% 50–60%. 60–70% 70–80% Ellsworth: 40–50% 50–60%
U.S. senator before election
Evan Bayh
Democratic
Elected U.S. Senator
Dan Coats
Republican

Incumbent Democrat Evan Bayh decided in February 2010 to retire instead of seeking a third term shortly after former U.S. Senator Dan Coats announced his candidacy for Bayh's contested seat. No Democratic candidate submitted enough signatures by the deadline to run, leading Democratic officials to choose U.S. Congressman Brad Ellsworth to be the nominee. Coats won the election.

Indiana Republican primary election
Party	Candidate	Votes	%
Republican	Dan Coats	217,225	39.5%
Republican	Marlin Stutzman	160,981	29.2%
Republican	John Hostettler	124,494	22.6%
Republican	Don Bates, Jr.	24,664	4.5%
Republican	Richard Behney	23,005	4.2%
Total votes		550,369	100.0%

After Coats's win in the Republican primary, Ellsworth began to heavily criticize Coats for his ties to lobbyists. He called for more disclosure of the meetings lawmakers have with lobbyists, banning congressional staff from lobbying for six years after their congressional jobs, requiring Congress members to put all their investments in blind trusts, more disclosure of Senate candidates' personal financial information, and changes to the U.S. Senate filibuster rules. He proposed lowering number of votes required to break a filibuster to 55 from the current 60. In response to Ellsworth's charges, Coats published his lobbying record in an 815-page document.

Coats emphasized the individual issues rather than ethics reforms advocated by his opponent. He focused on Ellsworth's record of voting in support of the Economic Stimulus Act of 2008, cap-and-trade legislation, and health care bill. Coats opinion of the healthcare law was that "the only responsible solution ... is to repeal the Obama-Pelosi-Ellsworth health spending bill and quickly replace it with cost-effective, incremental pieces that will decrease costs, increase coverage and not break the bank."

Indiana election
Party	Candidate	Votes	%	±%
Republican	Dan Coats	952,116	54.60%	+17.37%
Democratic	Brad Ellsworth	697,775	40.01%	−21.64%
Libertarian	Rebecca Sink-Burris	94,330	5.39%	+4.27%
Majority		254,341	14.58%	
Total votes		1,743,921	100.00%	
Republican gain from Democratic		Swing		

== Iowa ==
Iowa election
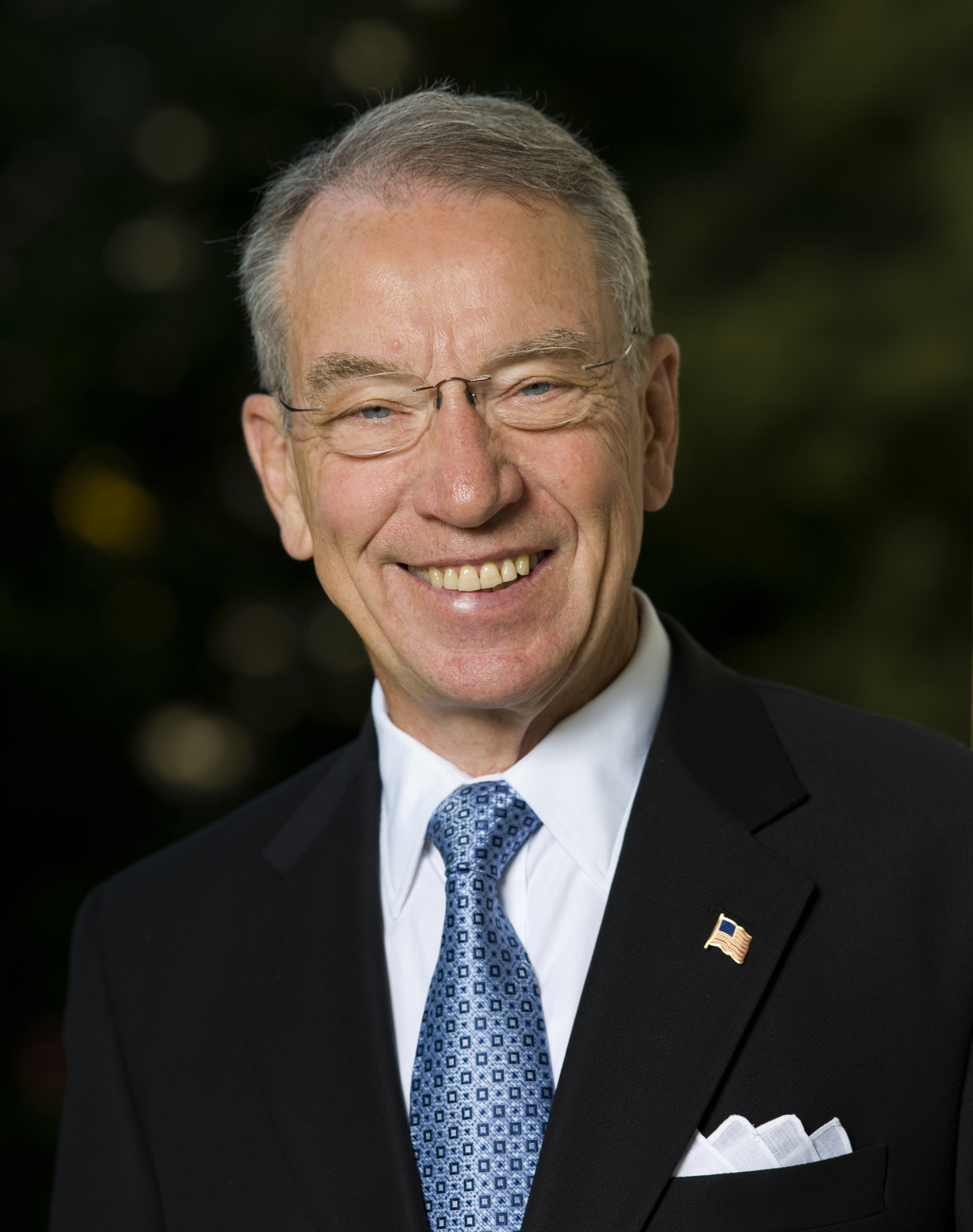

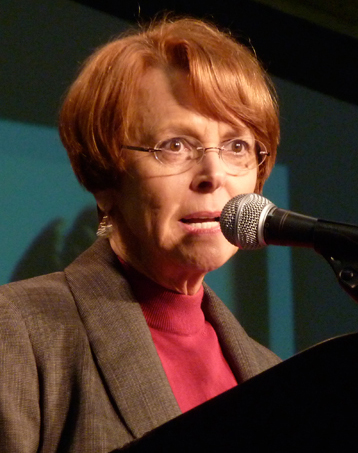
Nominee	Chuck Grassley	Roxanne Conlin
Party	Republican	Democratic
Popular vote	718,215	371,686
Percentage	64.4%	33.3%
- County results Grassley: 50-60% 60-70% 70-80% 80-90% >90% Conlin: 50–60%
U.S. senator before election
Chuck Grassley
Republican
Elected U.S. Senator
Chuck Grassley
Republican

Incumbent Republican Chuck Grassley won re-election to a sixth term.

Republican primary election
Party	Candidate	Votes	%
Republican	Chuck Grassley (inc.)	197,194	98.0%
Republican	Write-ins	3,926	2.0%
Total votes		201,120	100.0%

Democratic primary election
Party	Candidate	Votes	%
Democratic	Roxanne Conlin	52,715	77.5%
Democratic	Bob Krause	8,728	12.9%
Democratic	Tom Fiegen	6,357	9.4%
Democratic	Write-ins	177	0.2%
Total votes		67,977	100.0%

Incumbent Chuck Grassley started the campaign moderately popular, but his approval ratings dropped somewhat during the campaign. However, the seat continued to be considered to be "Safe Republican" by many sources, with CQ Politics noting that Grassley is "one of Iowa's most durable politicians."

Conlin described herself as a "prairie progressive." She supported the recent landmark case of Varnum v. Brien, which legalized gay marriage in the state. She also supported repeal of "don't ask, don't tell."

Before the election, former political advisor John Maxwell claimed that Grassley would have his toughest race since his first U.S. Senate election in 1980, where he defeated incumbent John Culver with 53% of the vote. Grassley won all of his four re-election bids with nearly 70% of the vote against unknown opponents. Grassley won the election with 64.51% of the vote.

2010 United States Senate election in Iowa
Party	Candidate	Votes	%	±%
Republican	Chuck Grassley (Incumbent)	718,215	64.35%	−5.83%
Democratic	Roxanne Conlin	371,686	33.30%	+5.43%
Libertarian	John Heiderscheit	25,290	2.27%	
Write-ins		872	0.08%	
Majority		346,529	31.05%	−11.26%
Turnout		1,116,063		
Republican hold		Swing		

== Kansas ==
Kansas election
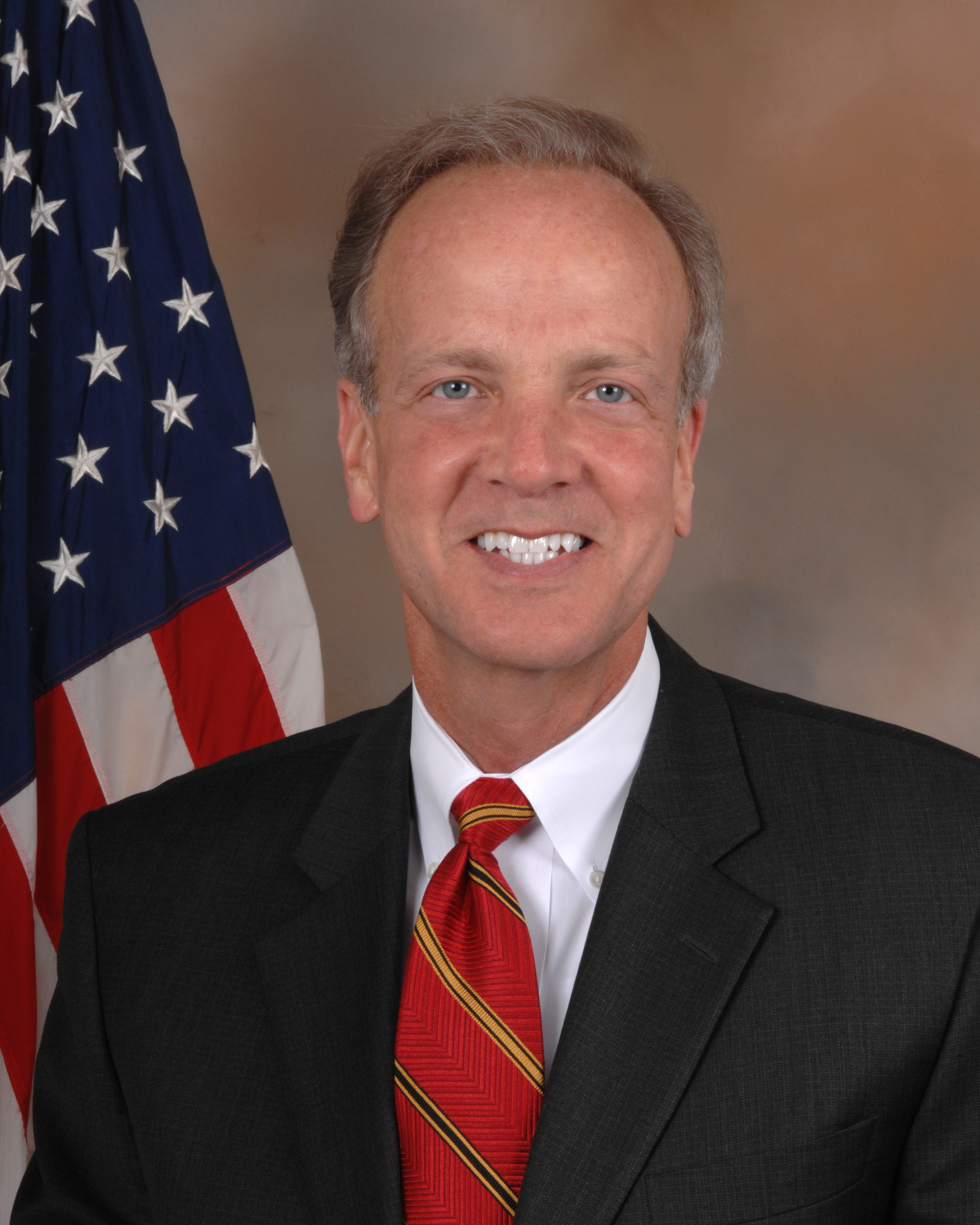

Nominee	Jerry Moran	Lisa Johnston
Party	Republican	Democratic
Popular vote	578,768	215,270
Percentage	70.3%	26.2%
- County results Moran: 50–60% 60–70% 70–80% 80–90% >90% Johnston: 40–50% 50–60%
U.S. senator before election
Sam Brownback
Republican
Elected U.S. Senator
Jerry Moran
Republican

Incumbent Republican Sam Brownback retired to run for Governor of Kansas, instead of seeking a third term. Republican nominee Jerry Moran won the open seat. Kansas is one of the most Republican states in the nation; no Democrat had been elected to either Senate seat since 1932.

Democratic primary election
Party	Candidate	Votes	%
Democratic	Lisa Johnston	25,421	31.2%
Democratic	Charles Schollenberger	19,228	23.6%
Democratic	David Haley	15,584	19.2%
Democratic	Patrick Wiesner	13,359	16.4%
Democratic	Robert Conroy	7,779	9.6%
Total votes		81,371	100.00%

The retirement of Brownback, a popular U.S. Senator, led to a heavily competitive primary election. Tiahrt, who was on the Committee of Appropriations, had been accused of excessive earmarking while he was in Congress. From 2006 to 2008, Tiahrt had requested and supported a total of 63 solo earmarks, costing $53.9 million. In the same period, Moran had requested and supported a total of 29 earmarks, with a pricetag of $13.4 million.

Republican primary election
Party	Candidate	Votes	%
Republican	Jerry Moran	161,407	49.8%
Republican	Todd Tiahrt	144,372	44.6%
Republican	Tom Little	10,104	3.1%
Republican	Bob Londerholm	8,168	2.5%
Total votes		324,051	100.00%

After the primaries, Moran chose not to release any more negative advertisements. Democrat Lisa Johnston ran a low-profile, quiet race. On election day, she won only two counties: Wyandotte County and Douglas County, while Moran won statewide by a landslide.

2010 United States Senate election in Kansas
Party	Candidate	Votes	%	±%
Republican	Jerry Moran	578,768	70.34%	+1.18%
Democratic	Lisa Johnston	215,270	26.16%	−1.33%
Libertarian	Michael Dann	17,437	2.12%	+0.18%
Reform	Joe Bellis	11,356	1.38%	−0.04%
Majority		363,498	44.18%	
Total votes		822,831	100.00%	
Republican hold		Swing		

== Kentucky ==
Kentucky election
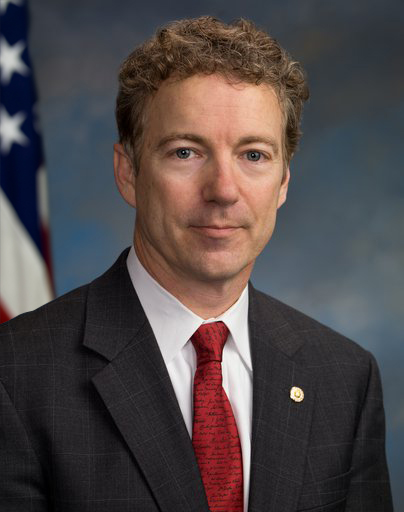

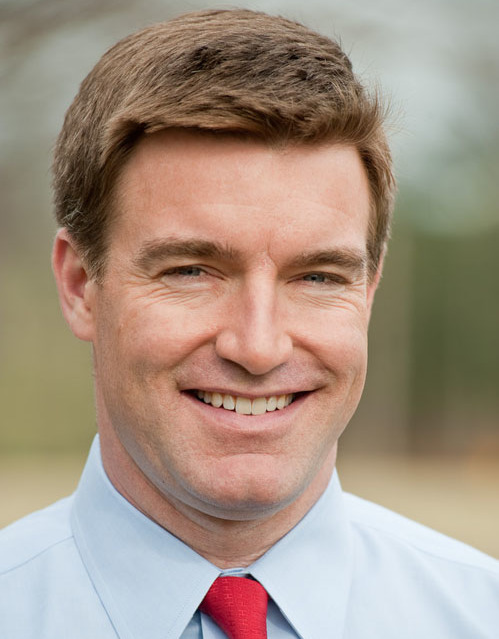
Nominee	Rand Paul	Jack Conway
Party	Republican	Democratic
Popular vote	755,411	599,843
Percentage	55.7%	44.2%
- County results Paul: 50–60% 60–70% 70–80% Conway: 50–60% 60–70% Tie: 50%
U.S. senator before election
Jim Bunning
Republican
Elected U.S. Senator
Rand Paul
Republican

Incumbent Republican Jim Bunning retired instead of seeking a third term. Republican nominee Rand Paul won the open seat.

On May 18, 2010, Paul won the Republican nomination. After conceding the election to Paul, Grayson said, "It's time to put all differences aside, unite behind Dr. Paul, he needs our help and I for one stand ready to serve".

Republican primary election
Party	Candidate	Votes	%
Republican	Rand Paul	206,986	58.8%
Republican	Trey Grayson	124,864	35.4%
Republican	Bill Johnson	7,861	2.2%
Republican	John Stephenson	6,885	2.0%
Republican	Gurley L. Martin	2,850	0.8%
Republican	Jon J. Scribner	2,829	0.8%
Total votes		352,275	100.0%

Democratic primary election
Party	Candidate	Votes	%
Democratic	Jack Conway	229,433	44.0%
Democratic	Daniel Mongiardo	225,260	43.2%
Democratic	Darlene Fitzgerald Price	28,531	5.5%
Democratic	James Buckmaster	20,561	3.9%
Democratic	Maurice Sweeney	17,874	3.4%
Total votes		521,659	100.0%

Grayson attacked Paul for his "strange ideas," such as his opposition of the PATRIOT Act, and what Grayson alleged to be his support of closing down Guantanamo Bay and saying that Iran was not a threat. He also attacked Paul for being a Duke University fan. He sent out another TV ad and web video that stirred controversy by making the case that Paul believes that foreign policy decisions made prior to September 11, 2001, are partially to blame for the attacks. Paul immediately responded by launching a statewide television ad in which he expresses his "outrage at terrorists who killed 3,000 innocents" before accusing Grayson of a "lie" and a "shameful" tactic. Grayson accused the Fox News Channel of favoring Paul over him.

Conway began the race trailing Paul, but as he attacked his opponent's positions on social-welfare and criminal-justice policies, the polls began to tighten. The campaign attracted $8.5 million in contributions from outside groups, of which $6 million was spent to help Rand Paul and $2.5 million to help Conway. This money influx was in addition to the money spent by the candidates themselves: $6 million by Paul and $4.7 million by Conway.

Kentucky election
Party	Candidate	Votes	%	±%
Republican	Rand Paul	755,411	55.69%	+5.03%
Democratic	Jack Conway	599,617	44.26%	−5.12%
Majority		155,599	11.48%	
Total votes		1,354,833	100.00%	
Republican hold		Swing		

== Louisiana ==
Louisiana election
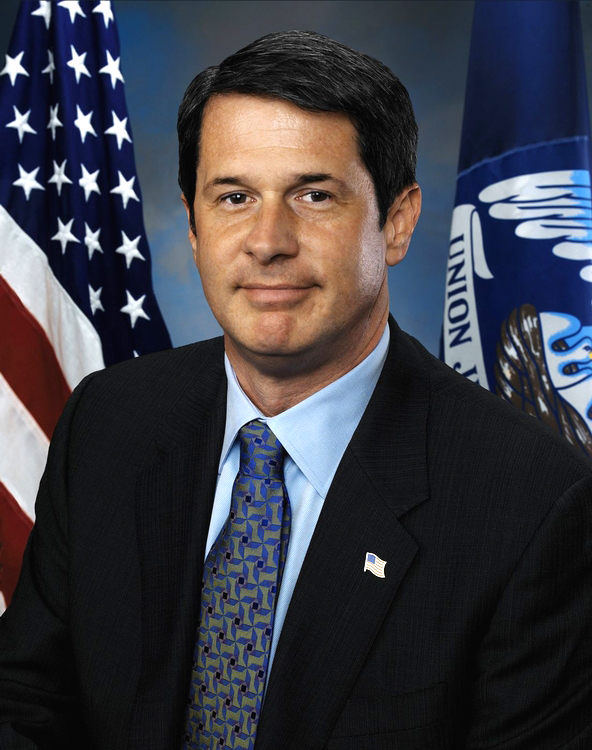

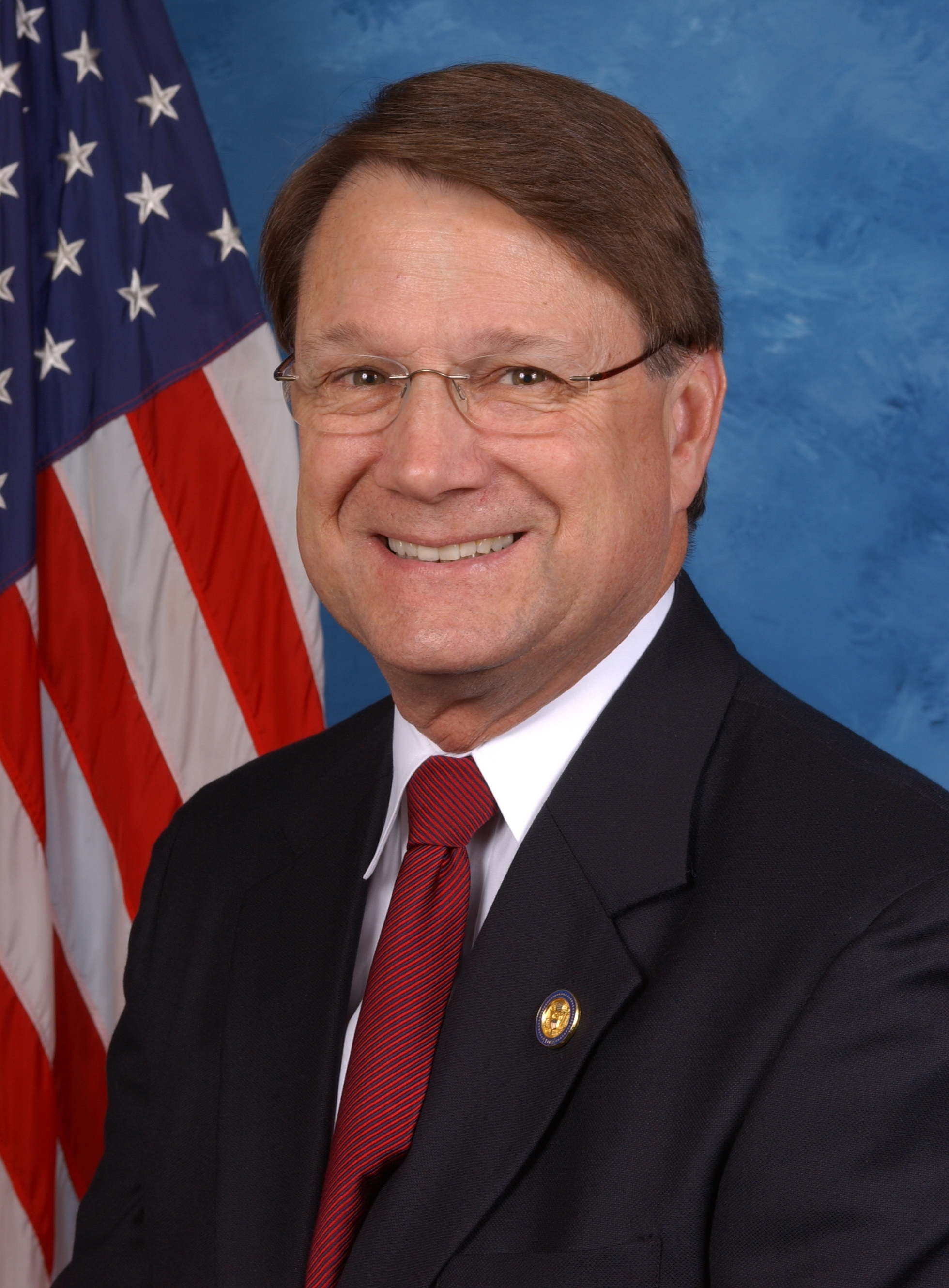
Nominee	David Vitter	Charlie Melancon
Party	Republican	Democratic
Popular vote	715,304	476,423
Percentage	56.6%	37.7%
- Parish results Vitter: 40-50% 50-60% 60–70% 70-80% Melançon: 40–50% 50–60% 70–80%
U.S. senator before election
David Vitter
Republican
Elected U.S. Senator
David Vitter
Republican

Incumbent Republican David Vitter won re-election to a second term. Some speculated that Vitter's re-election might have become complicated, by the prostitution scandal revealed in 2007, but he continued to lead in aggregate polling against potential opponents.

Louisiana Democratic primary election
Party	Candidate	Votes	%
Democratic	Charlie Melançon	77,702	70.6%
Democratic	Neeson Chauvin	19,507	17.7%
Democratic	Cary Deaton	12,842	11.7%
Total votes		110,051	100.0%

Louisiana Republican primary election
Party	Candidate	Votes	%
Republican	David Vitter (Incumbent)	85,179	87.6%
Republican	Chet Traylor	6,838	7.0%
Republican	Nick Accardo	5,221	5.4%
Total votes		97,238	100.0%

Melançon heavily criticized Vitter for the prostitution sex scandal. Vitter released television advertising criticizing Melancon for his support for Obama's stimulus package and his support for amnesty for illegal immigrants. Melancon claimed "In August, Melancon challenged Vitter to a series of five live, televised town hall-style debates across the state. In his 2004 campaign for Senate, Vitter committed to five live, televised debates. Since Melancon issued the challenge, Vitter and Melancon have been invited to a total of seven live, televised debates. Vitter only accepted invitations to debates hosted by WWL-TV and WDSU-TV, both in New Orleans.

Louisiana election
Party	Candidate	Votes	%	±%
Republican	David Vitter (Incumbent)	715,304	56.56%	+5.53%
Democratic	Charlie Melancon	476,423	37.67%	+8.44%
Libertarian	Randall Hayes	13,952	1.10%	N/A
Independent	Michael Brown	9,970	0.79%	N/A
Independent	Mike Spears	9,188	0.73%	N/A
Independent	Ernest Wooton	8,164	0.65%	N/A
Independent	Skip Galan	7,471	0.59%	N/A
Reform	William McShan	5,879	0.46%	N/A
Independent	Bob Lang	5,732	0.45%	N/A
Independent	Milton Gordon	4,806	0.38%	N/A
Independent	Tommy LaFargue	4,042	0.32%	N/A
Independent	Sam Melton	3,779	0.30%	N/A
Majority		238,881	18.89%	
Total votes		1,264,710	100.00%	
Republican hold		Swing		

== Maryland ==
Maryland election
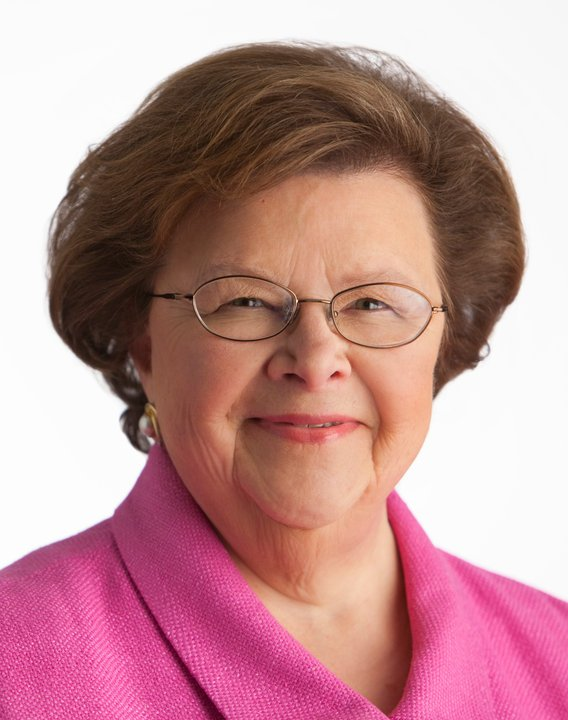

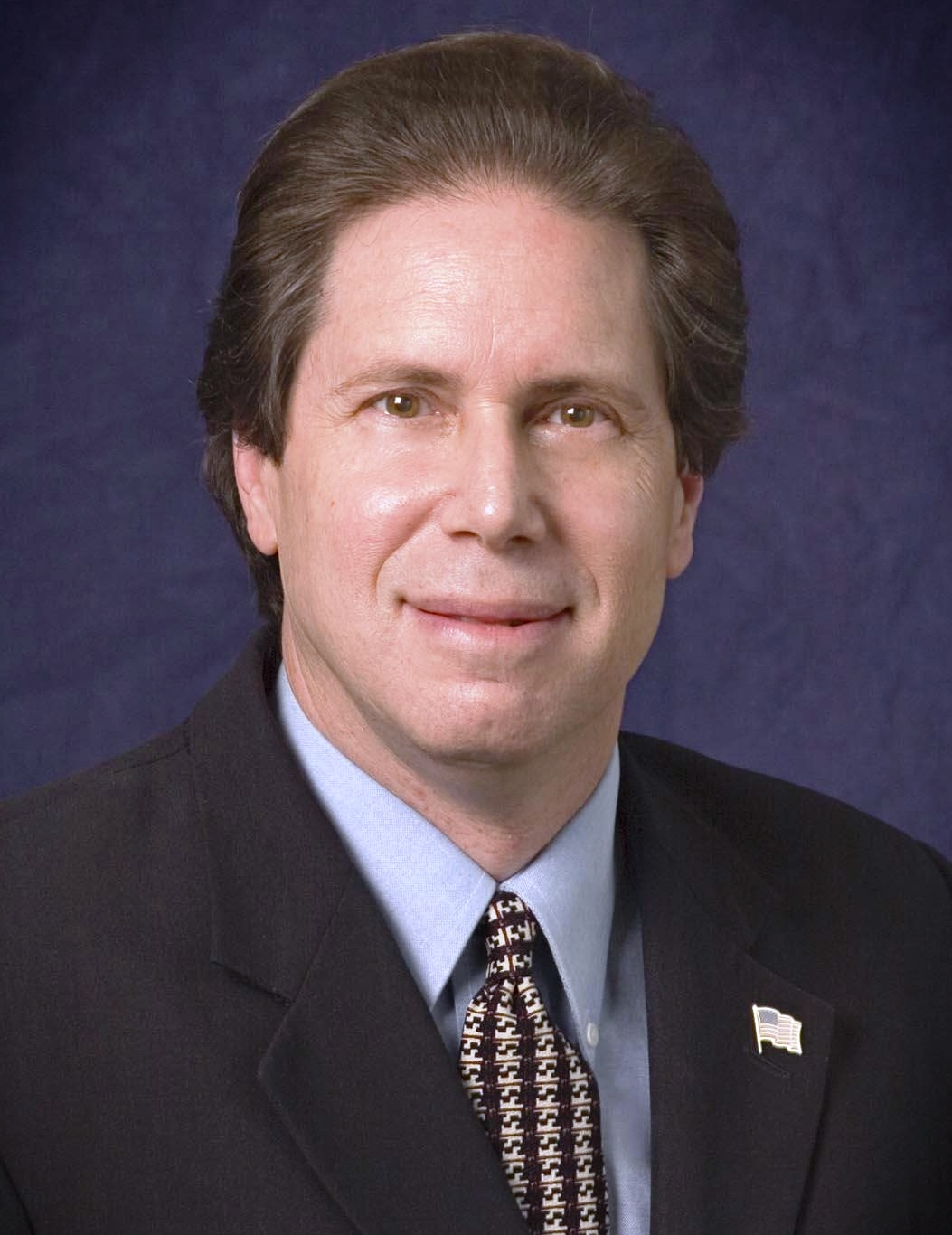
Nominee	Barbara Mikulski	Eric Wargotz
Party	Democratic	Republican
Popular vote	1,140,531	655,666
Percentage	62.2%	35.8%
- County results Mikulski: 40–50% 50–60% 60–70% 70–80% 80–90% Wargotz: 40–50% 50–60% 60–70%
U.S. senator before election
Barbara Mikulski
Democratic
Elected U.S. Senator
Barbara Mikulski
Democratic

Incumbent Democrat Barbara Mikulski won re-election to a fifth term.

Democratic primary election
Party	Candidate	Votes	%
Democratic	Barbara Mikulski (Incumbent)	388,868	82.32%
Democratic	Christopher J. Garner	35,579	7.53%
Democratic	A. Billy Bob Jaworski	15,131	3.20%
Democratic	Blaine Taylor	10,787	2.28%
Democratic	Theresa C. Scaldaferri	7,913	1.68%
Democratic	Sanquetta Taylor	7,365	1.56%
Democratic	Lih Young	6,733	1.43%
Total votes		472,376	100.00%

Republican primary election
Party	Candidate	Votes	%
Republican	Eric Wargotz	92,464	38.57%
Republican	Jim Rutledge	73,311	30.58%
Republican	Joseph Alexander	14,026	5.85%
Republican	Neil H. Cohen	13,613	5.68%
Republican	Stephens Dempsey	9,325	3.89%
Republican	Daniel W. McAndrew	8,460	3.53%
Republican	John B. Kimble	8,081	3.37%
Republican	Samuel R. Graham, Sr.	6,600	2.75%
Republican	Barry Steve Asbury	5,900	2.46%
Republican	Eddie Vendetti	5,046	2.10%
Republican	Gregory Kump	2,931	1.22%
Total votes		239,757	100.00%

Republican nominee Eric Wargotz, Queen Anne's County, Maryland Commission President and physician, compared Mikulski to a dinosaur by calling her a political "insidersaurus" for being in Washington for over thirty years An ad showed a hammer hitting a brick wall, breaking it down and citing criticisms of Mikulski's record as a U.S. Senator. Mikulski released advertisements emphasizing education and job creation. Despite Wargotz's limited campaign and resources he received the highest percentage of votes against Mikulski as an incumbent U.S. Senator

2010 United States Senate election in Maryland
Party	Candidate	Votes	%	±%
Democratic	Barbara Mikulski (Incumbent)	1,140,531	62.19%	−2.61%
Republican	Eric Wargotz	655,666	35.75%	+2.05%
Green	Kenniss Henry	20,717	1.13%	+0.06%
Constitution	Richard Shawver	14,746	0.80%	+0.42%
Write-ins		2,213	0.11%	+0.05%
Majority		484,865	26.44%	
Total votes		1,833,873	100.00%	
Democratic hold		Swing		

== Massachusetts (special) ==
Massachusetts special election
- January 19, 2010
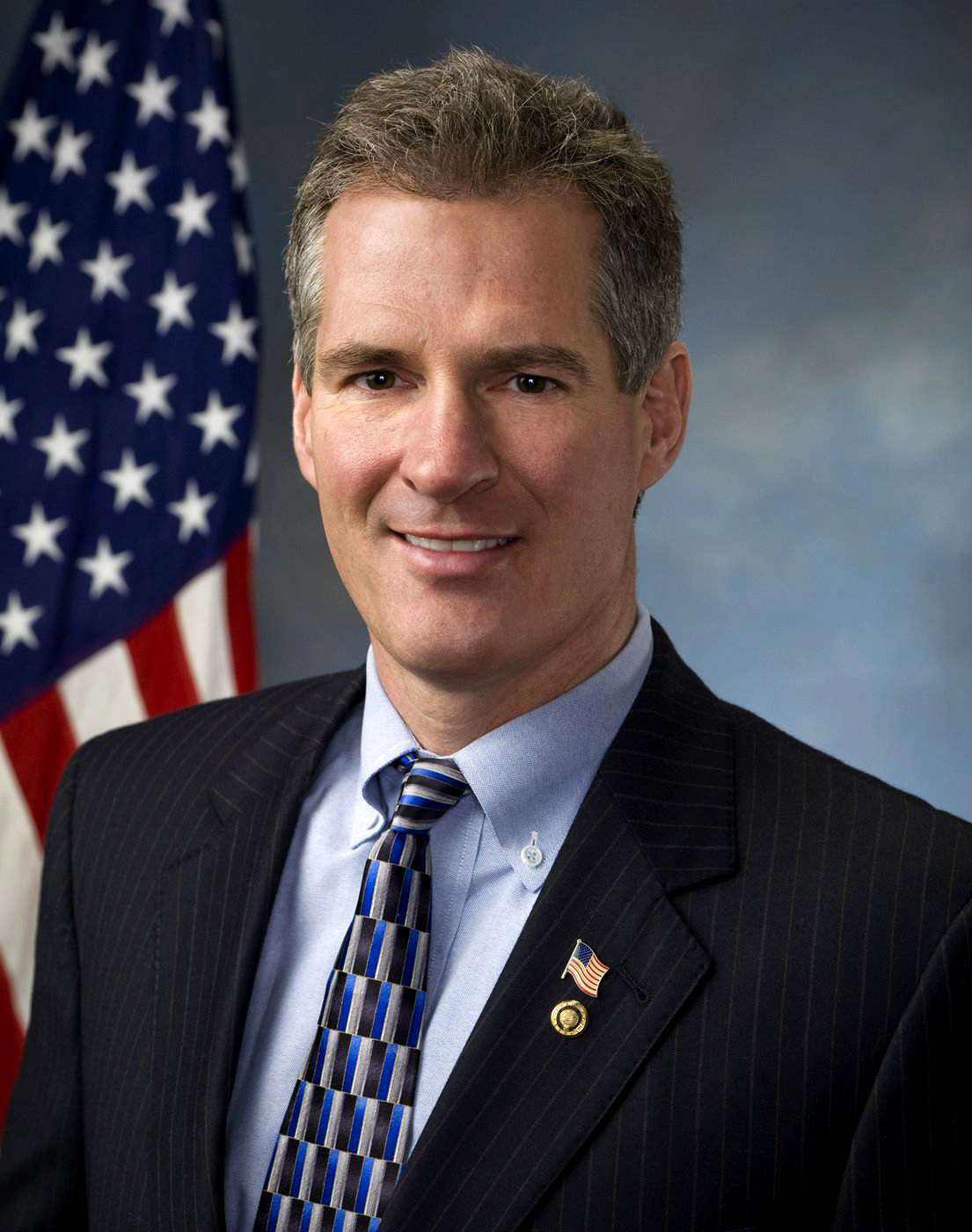

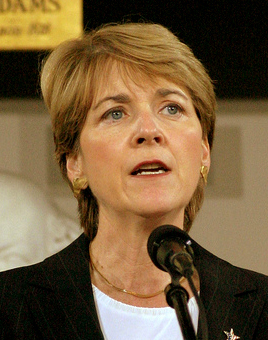
Nominee	Scott Brown	Martha Coakley
Party	Republican	Democratic
Popular vote	1,168,178	1,060,861
Percentage	51.9%	47.1%
- Brown: 40–50% 50–60% 60–70% 70–80% Coakley: 40–50% 50–60% 60–70% 70–80% Tie: 40–50%
U.S. senator before election
Paul Kirk
Democratic
Elected U.S. senator
Scott Brown
Republican

A special election was held January 19, 2010 to fill the Class 1 seat for the remainder of the term ending January 3, 2013. It was won by Republican Scott Brown.

Incumbent Democrat Ted Kennedy had died on August 25, 2009. Governor of Massachusetts appointed Democrat Paul Kirk September 24, 2009, to continue the term pending this special election, in which Kirk was not a candidate.

The election was viewed by conservatives outside of Massachusetts as a referendum on President Barack Obama. However, Brown stated that he didn't believe that it was a referendum on Obama. Although Democrats would retain control of both Houses of Congress until January 2011, Brown's victory greatly affected their political plans, most notably for the Patient Protection and Affordable Care Act, though the legislation was signed into law two months later. Brown became the first Republican to win this seat since 1946, and as of 2026, this is the last Senate election in Massachusetts won by a Republican.

Massachusetts Democratic primary election
Party	Candidate	Votes	%
Democratic	Martha Coakley	310,227	47%
Democratic	Mike Capuano	184,791	28%
Democratic	Alan Khazei	88,929	13%
Democratic	Stephen Pagliuca	80,248	12%
Total votes		664,195	100%

Massachusetts Republican primary election
Party	Candidate	Votes	%
Republican	Scott Brown	145,465	89%
Republican	Jack Robinson	17,241	11%
Total votes		162,706	100%

Massachusetts special election
Party	Candidate	Votes	%
Republican	Scott Brown	1,168,178	51.83%
Democratic	Martha Coakley	1,060,861	47.07%
Libertarian	Joseph L. Kennedy	22,388	0.99%
	All others	1,155	0.05%
	Blanks	1,145	0.05%
Total votes		2,253,727	100%
Turnout			54%
Republican gain from Democratic			

== Missouri ==
Missouri election
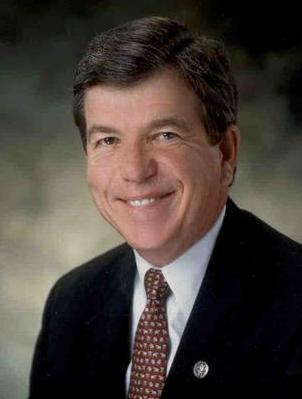

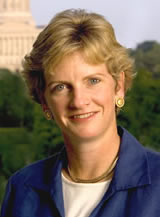
Nominee	Roy Blunt	Robin Carnahan
Party	Republican	Democratic
Popular vote	1,054,160	789,736
Percentage	54.2%	40.6%
- County results Blunt: 40–50% 50–60% 60–70% 70–80% Carnahan: 50–60% 70–80%
U.S. senator before election
Kit Bond
Republican
Elected U.S. Senator
Roy Blunt
Republican

Incumbent Republican Kit Bond retired instead of seeking a fifth term. Republican nominee Roy Blunt won the open seat.

Republican primary election
Party	Candidate	Votes	%
Republican	Roy Blunt	411,040	70.9%
Republican	Chuck Purgason	75,663	13.1%
Republican	Kristi Nichols	40,744	7.0%
Republican	Deborah Solomon	15,099	2.6%
Republican	Hector Maldonado	8,731	1.5%
Republican	Davis Conway	8,525	1.5%
Republican	R.L. Praprotnik	8,047	1.4%
Republican	Tony Laszacs	6,309	1.1%
Republican	Mike Vontz	5,190	0.9%
Total votes		579,348	100.00%

Democratic primary election
Party	Candidate	Votes	%
Democratic	Robin Carnahan	266,349	83.9%
Democratic	Richard Charles Tolbert	33,731	10.6%
Democratic	Francis Vangeli	17,511	5.5%
Total votes		317,591	100.00%

Democrat Robin Carnahan and national Democrats heavily criticized Blunt for his support of bailouts, calling him "Bailout Blunt." Blunt criticized her for supporting President Obama's stimulus package, the cap-and-trade energy bill, and the health care reform bill.

2010 United States Senate election in Missouri
Party	Candidate	Votes	%	±%
Republican	Roy Blunt	1,054,160	54.23%	−1.86%
Democratic	Robin Carnahan	789,736	40.63%	−2.17%
Libertarian	Jonathan Dine	58,663	3.02%	+2.29%
Constitution	Jerry Beck	41,309	2.13%	+1.74%
Majority		264,424	13.60%	
Total votes		1,943,868	100.00%	
Republican hold		Swing		

== Nevada ==
Nevada election
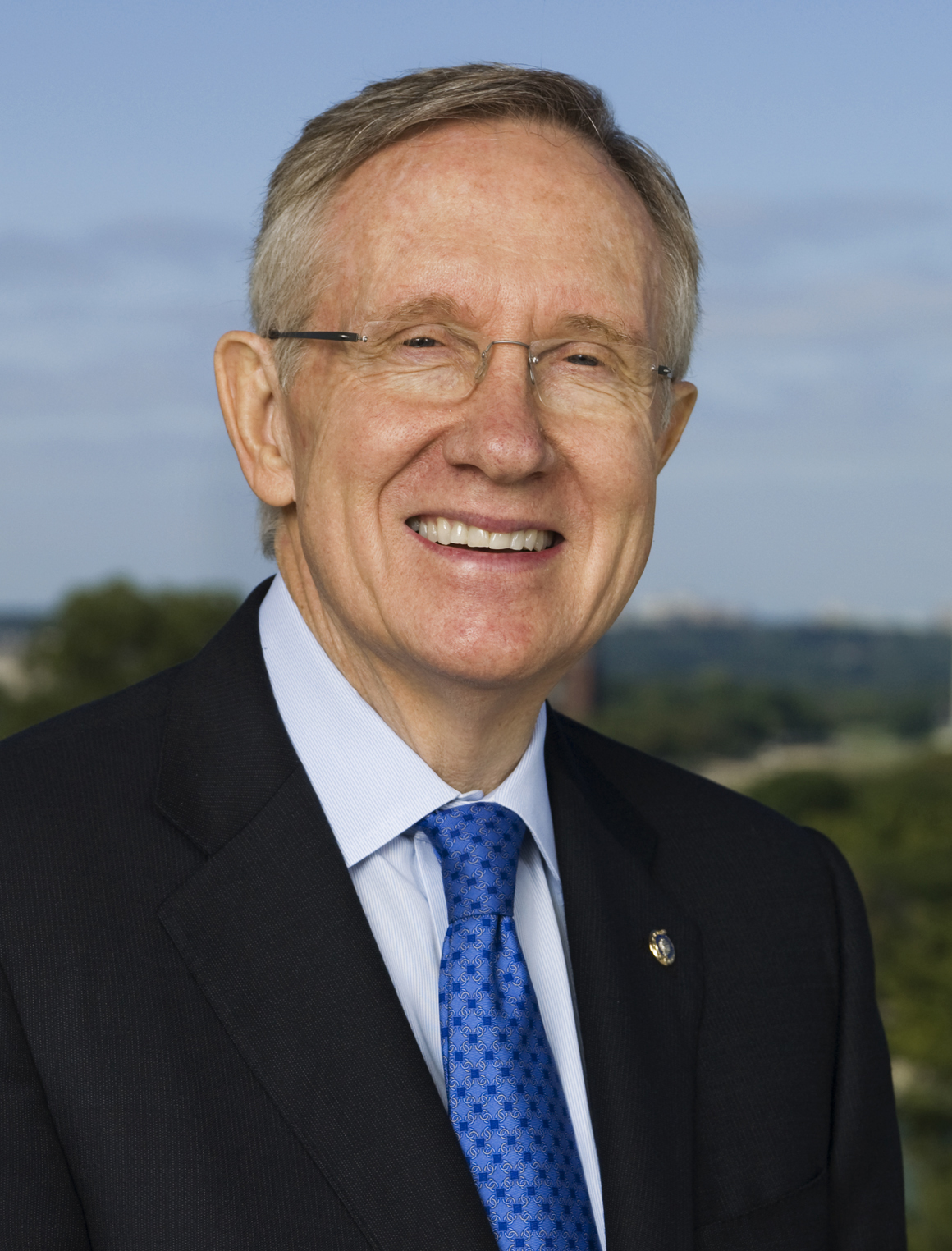

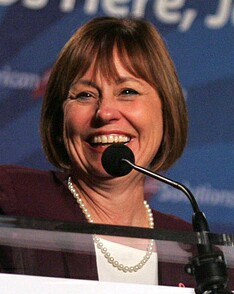
Nominee	Harry Reid	Sharron Angle
Party	Democratic	Republican
Popular vote	362,785	321,361
Percentage	50.2%	44.5%
- County results Reid: 40–50% 50–60% Angle: 40–50% 50–60% 60–70%
U.S. senator before election
Harry Reid
Democratic
Elected U.S. Senator
Harry Reid
Democratic

Incumbent Democratic Majority Leader Harry Reid won re-election to a fifth term.

Democratic primary Tuesday, June 8, 2010
Party	Candidate	Votes	%
Democratic	Harry Reid (Incumbent)	87,401	75.3%
Democratic	None of these	12,341	10.6%
Democratic	Alex Miller	9,717	8.4%
Democratic	Eduardo Hamilton	4,645	4.0%
Democratic	Carlo Poliak	1,938	1.7%
Total votes		116,042	100.00%

Republican primary Tuesday, June 8, 2010
Party	Candidate	Votes	%
Republican	Sharron Angle	70,452	40.1%
Republican	Sue Lowden	45,890	26.1%
Republican	Danny Tarkanian	40,936	23.3%
Republican	John Chachas	6,926	3.9%
Republican	Chad Christensen	4,806	2.7%
Republican	None of these	3,091	1.8%
Republican	Bill Parson	1,484	0.8%
Republican	Gary Bernstein	698	0.4%
Republican	Garn Mabey	462	0.3%
Republican	Cecilia Stern	355	0.2%
Republican	Brian Nadell	235	0.1%
Republican	Terry Suominen	224	0.1%
Republican	Gary Marinch	179	0.1%
Total votes		175,738	100.00%

Reid was initially considered vulnerable, with the non-partisan Cook Political Report rating the election as a toss-up and the Rothenberg Political Report rating the state as toss-up. A June 9, 2010, Rasmussen Reports post-primary poll showed Angle leading incumbent Senator Harry Reid by a margin of 50% to 39%. However, a July 2010 poll showed Senator Reid leading Angle by 7 points, following nationwide attention to some of Angle's positions, as well as the endorsement of Reid by prominent Republicans. The change of margin, 18% in less than a month, is the largest in Senate elections history. On July 28, 2010, Rasmussen Reports moved the race from toss-up to leans Democratic. Later, it moved back to toss-up. Despite Angle leading by three points in the polls the days leading up to the election, Reid defeated her by 5.74%, even in her own county, Washoe County. Reid also secured huge numbers out of the Democratic stronghold of Clark County, which covers the Las Vegas Metropolitan Area. Angle's far right beliefs and positions were also widely cited as a reason for the failure of the Republican Party defeating Reid.

2010 United States Senate election in Nevada
Party	Candidate	Votes	%	±%
Democratic	Harry Reid (Incumbent)	362,785	50.29%	−10.84%
Republican	Sharron Angle	321,361	44.55%	+9.45%
None of These Candidates	–	16,174	2.25%	+0.65%
Tea Party	Scott Ashjian	5,811	0.81%	N/A
Independent	Michael L. Haines	4,261	0.59%	N/A
Independent American Party (Nevada)	Timothy Fasano	3,185	0.44%	N/A
Independent	Jesse Holland	3,175	0.44%	N/A
Independent	Jeffery C. Reeves	2,510	0.35%	N/A
Independent	Wil Stand	2,119	0.29%	N/A
Majority		41,424	5.74%	
Total votes		721,381	100.00%	-11.14%
Democratic hold		Swing		

== New Hampshire ==
New Hampshire election
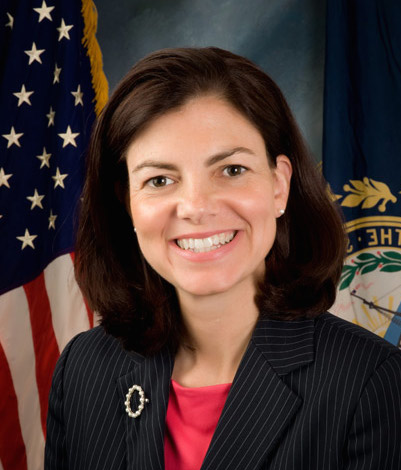

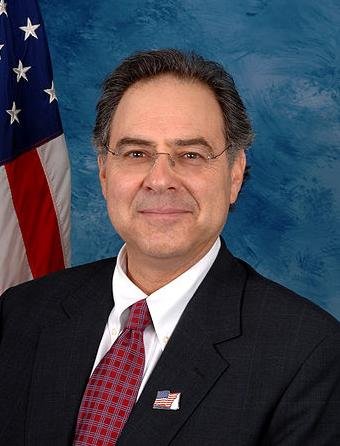
Nominee	Kelly Ayotte	Paul Hodes
Party	Republican	Democratic
Popular vote	272,703	166,538
Percentage	60.2%	36.7%
- Ayotte: 40–50% 50–60% 60–70% 70–80% 80–90% >90% Hodes: 40–50% 50–60% 60–70% 70–80% >90% Tie: 40–50%
U.S. senator before election
Judd Gregg
Republican
Elected U.S. Senator
Kelly Ayotte
Republican

Incumbent Republican Judd Gregg retired instead of seeking a fourth term. Republican nominee Kelly Ayotte won the open seat by over 23 points, after winning a close party primary. New Hampshire trended Democratic in the 2006 and 2008 elections, with Republican incumbents losing both of the state's House seats and its other Senate seat to Democrats, but polling conducted in late December 2008 showed Gregg defeating both of the state's U.S. Representatives in a hypothetical match-up.

Republican primary election
Party	Candidate	Votes	%
Republican	Kelly Ayotte	53,056	38.21%
Republican	Ovide Lamontagne	51,397	37.01%
Republican	Bill Binnie	19,508	14.05%
Republican	Jim Bender	12,611	9.08%
Republican	Dennis Lamare	1,388	1.00%
Republican	Tom Alciere	499	0.36%
Republican	Gerard Beloin	402	0.29%
Total votes		138,861	100.00%

Democrat Paul Hodes called himself a fiscal conservative, which was mocked by Republican Kelly Ayotte in a TV ad. Hodes was criticized for supporting President Obama's Economic Recovery package, a carbon energy tax, and Affordable Care Act. Hodes criticized Ayotte for numerous controversies. One ad was questioned Ayotte's honesty in dealing with the Lakes Region Ponzi scheme which defrauded investors of almost $80 million.

New Hampshire election
Party	Candidate	Votes	%	±%
Republican	Kelly Ayotte	272,703	60.16%	−6.08%
Democratic	Paul Hodes	166,538	36.74%	+2.99%
Independent	Chris Booth	9,285	2.05%	N/A
Libertarian	Ken Blevens	4,754	1.05%	+1.03%
Majority		106,165	23.42%	
Total votes		453,280	100.00%	
Republican hold		Swing		

== New York ==
There were two elections, due to the resignation of Hillary Clinton in January 2009 to become the U.S. Secretary of State. Both senate races, along with the New York gubernatorial election, one with a vulnerable Democratic incumbent and the other an open race, respectively, was believed to lead major New York Republicans to gravitate towards them rather than challenge the popular Schumer. As it happened, however, New York Republicans had difficulty drawing top-tier candidates to any of the three races.

=== New York (regular) ===
New York regular election
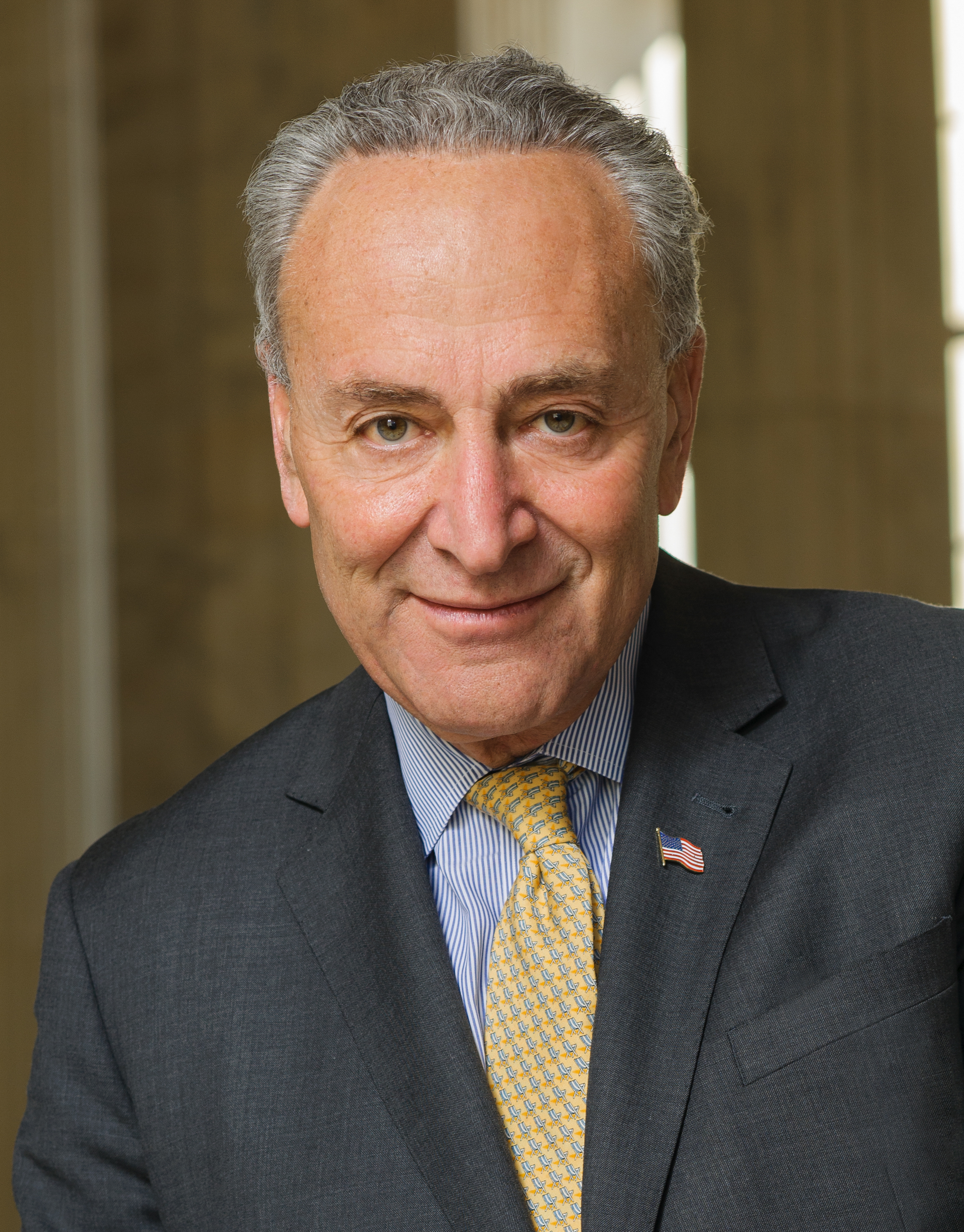

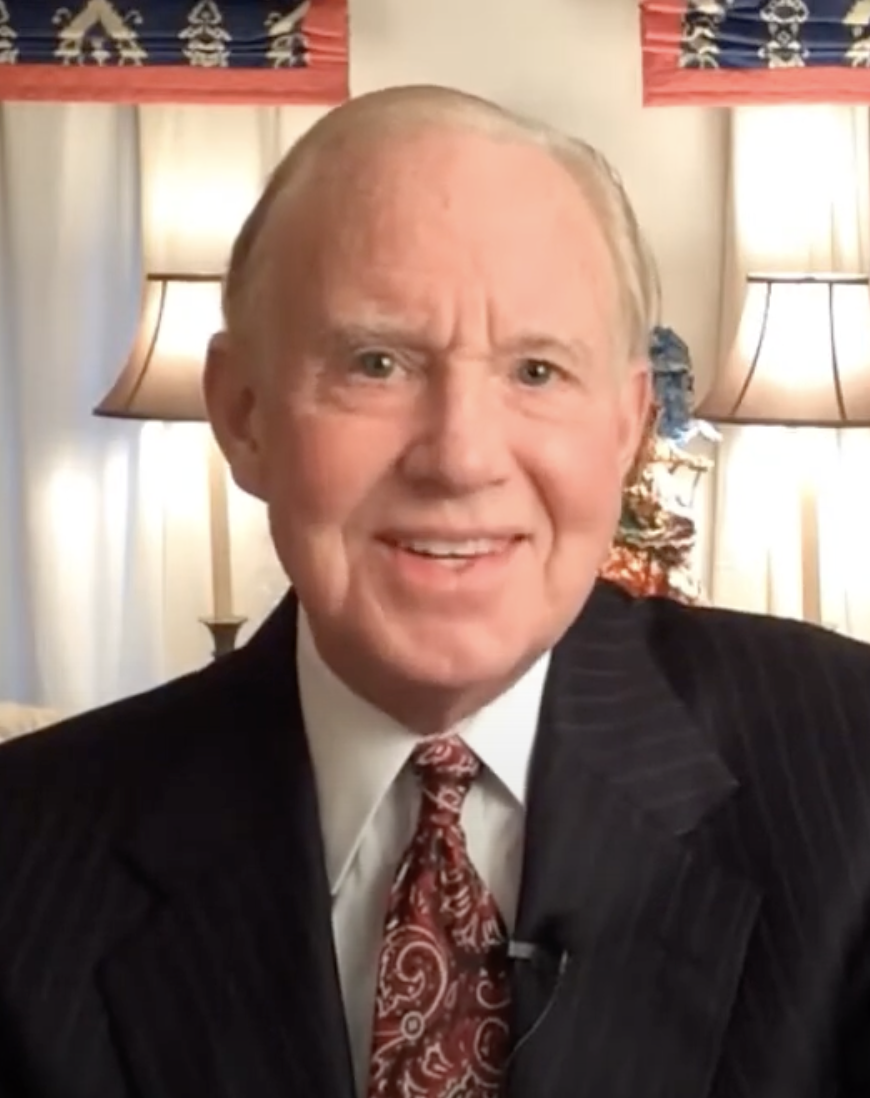
Nominee	Chuck Schumer	Jay Townsend
Party	Democratic	Republican
Popular vote	3,047,775	1,480,337
Percentage	66.4%	33.0%
- County results Schumer: 40–50% 50–60% 60–70% 70–80% 80–90% >90% Townsend: 40–50% 50–60%
U.S. senator before election
Chuck Schumer
Democratic
Elected U.S. Senator
Chuck Schumer
Democratic

Incumbent Democrat Chuck Schumer won re-election to a third term.

Republican primary election
Party	Candidate	Votes	%
Republican	Jay Townsend	234,440	55.41%
Republican	Gary Berntsen	188,628	44.59%
Total votes		423,068	100.00%

New York regular election
Party	Candidate	Votes	%
Democratic	Chuck Schumer (Incumbent)	2,686,043	56.27%
Working Families	Chuck Schumer (Incumbent)	183,672	3.85%
Independence	Chuck Schumer (Incumbent)	177,396	3.72%
Total	Chuck Schumer (Incumbent)	3,047,111	63.84%
Republican	Jay Townsend	1,238,947	25.96%
Conservative	Jay Townsend	240,777	5.04%
Total	Jay Townsend	1,479,724	31.00%
Green	Colia Clark	42,340	0.89%
Libertarian	Randy Credico	24,863	0.52%
None	Blank/Void/Scattering	179,373	3.76%
Total votes		4,773,411	100.0%
Democratic hold			

=== New York (special) ===
New York special election
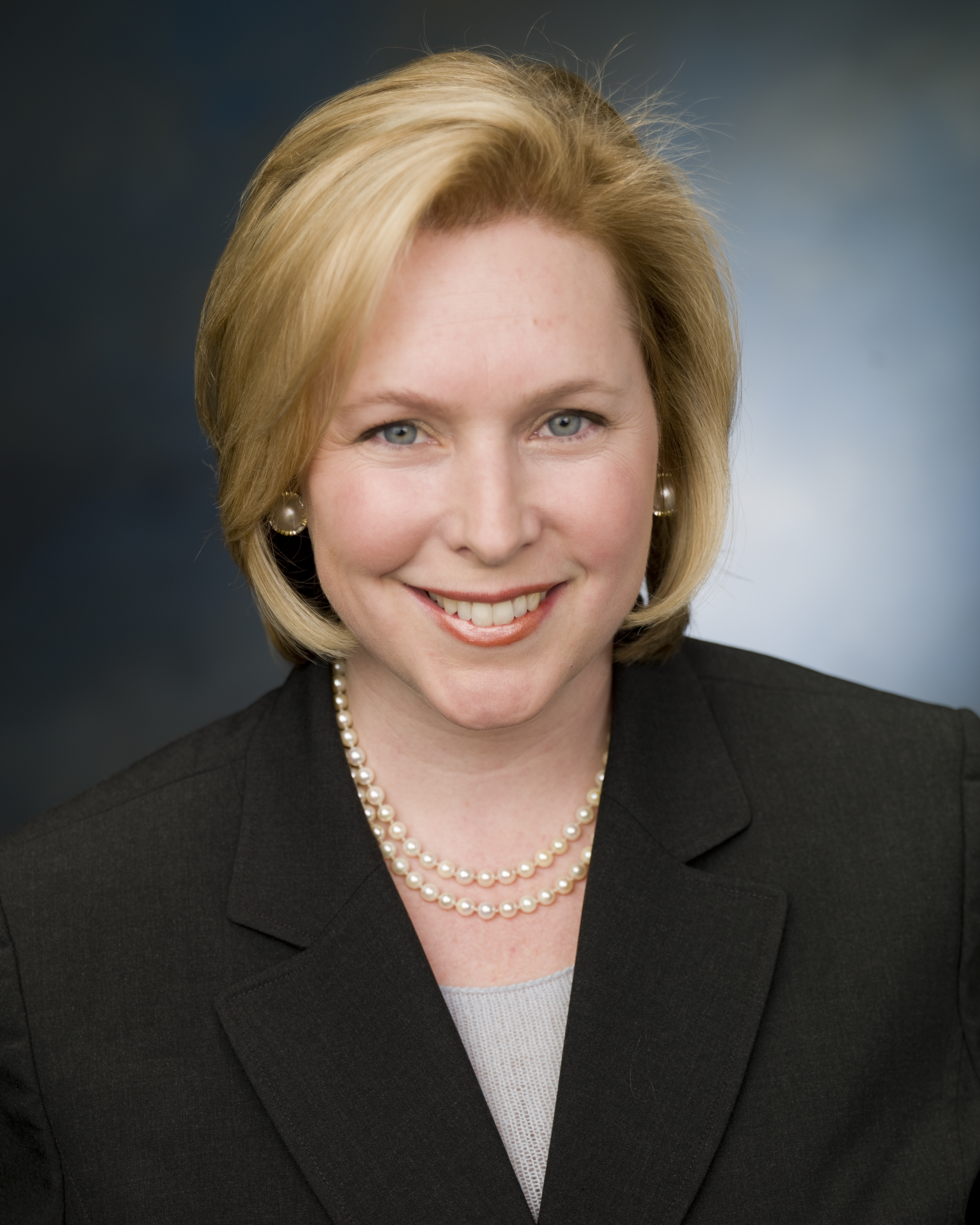

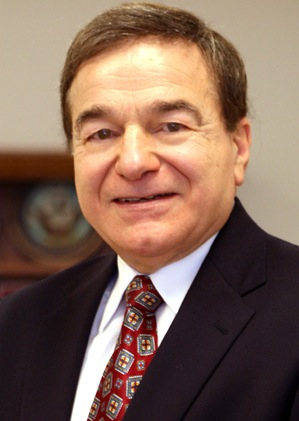
Nominee	Kirsten Gillibrand	Joseph DioGuardi
Party	Democratic	Republican
Popular vote	2,837,684	1,582,693
Percentage	59.6%	33.3%
- County results Gillibrand: 40–50% 50–60% 60–70% 70–80% 80–90% DioGuardi: 50–60%
U.S. senator before election
Kirsten Gillibrand
Democratic
Elected U.S. Senator
Kirsten Gillibrand
Democratic

Governor David Paterson had appointed Democrat Kirsten Gillibrand to serve as United States Senator this special election, replacing former Senator Hillary Clinton, who resigned to serve as U.S. Secretary of State in the Barack Obama administration. The winner of the special election would complete the term ending in January 2013. Due to this special election, this was the first time since the ratification of the 17th Amendment in 1913 that all of New York's six statewide offices were up for popular election on the same date.

Gillibrand claimed to be an independent thinker who took a back seat to no one. She also released television advertising touting her background from upstate New York while DioGuardi criticized Gillibrand's appearance in Vogue magazine.

New York Democratic primary election
Party	Candidate	Votes	%
Democratic	Kirsten Gillibrand (Incumbent)	464,512	76.1%
Democratic	Gail Goode	145,491	23.9%
Total votes		610,003	100.00%

New York Republican primary election
Party	Candidate	Votes	%
Republican	Joseph DioGuardi	185,483	41.8%
Republican	David Malpass	167,151	37.7%
Republican	Bruce Blakeman	91,312	20.5%
Total votes		443,946	100.0%

New York general election
Party	Candidate	Votes	%
Democratic	Kirsten Gillibrand (Incumbent)	2,479,393	
Working Families	Kirsten Gillibrand	182,655	
Independence	Kirsten Gillibrand	175,636	
Total	Kirsten Gillibrand (Incumbent)	2,837,684	59.64%
Republican	Joe DioGuardi	1,338,308	
Conservative	Joe DioGuardi	244,385	
Total	Joe DioGuardi	1,582,693	33.27%
Green	Cecile A. Lawrence	35,489	0.75%
Libertarian	John Clifton	18,414	0.39%
Rent Is Too Damn High	Joseph Huff	17,019	0.36%
Anti-Prohibition	Vivia Morgan	11,787	0.25%
Tax Revolt	Bruce Blakeman	4,516	0.09%
None	Blank, Void, and Scattered	250,033	5.26%
Majority		1,254,991	26.38%
Turnout		4,757,635	
Democratic hold			

== North Carolina ==
North Carolina election
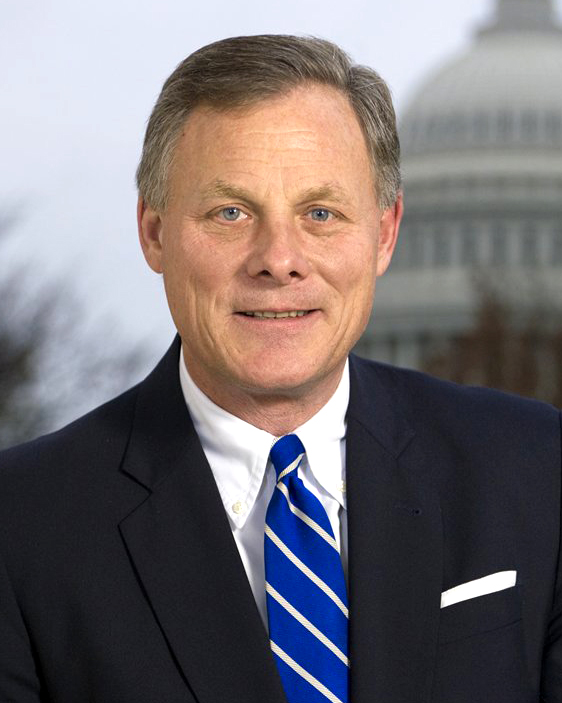

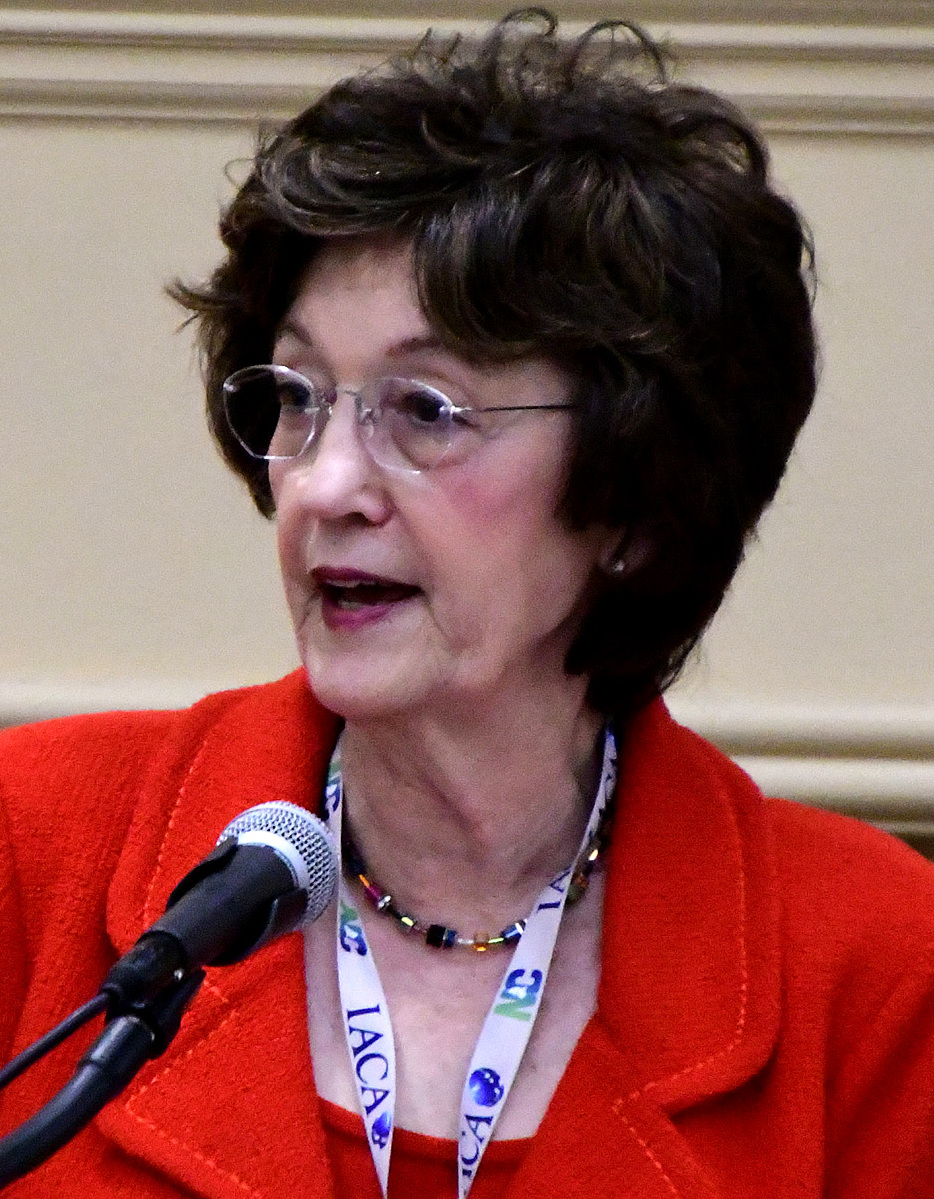
Nominee	Richard Burr	Elaine Marshall
Party	Republican	Democratic
Popular vote	1,458,046	1,145,074
Percentage	54.81%	43.05%
- Burr: 40–50% 50–60% 60–70% 70–80% Marshall: 50–60% 60–70% 70–80%
U.S. senator before election
Richard Burr
Republican
Elected U.S. Senator
Richard Burr
Republican

Incumbent Republican Richard Burr won re-election to a second term. Burr was the first incumbent to win re-election for this seat since Sam Ervin's last re-election in 1968. Burr's 54.8% also represented the highest vote share a North Carolina Republican received since the state began directly electing its senators.

This Senate seat was unfavorable to incumbents over the past several decades. No person elected to this seat was re-elected since Sam Ervin in 1968. His successor, Democrat Robert Burren Morgan, was defeated for re-election in 1980, along with many other incumbents from his party. His Republican successor, John Porter East, committed suicide in 1986. East's appointed successor, Jim Broyhill, served for just four months, resigning upon his November 1986 election loss to former Democratic Governor Terry Sanford. In 1992, the seat changed hands yet again, as Sanford was defeated by wealthy GOP businessman Lauch Faircloth, who himself lost in his bid for a second term six years later by John Edwards. In 2004, no incumbent was defeated, as Edwards was running for vice president and was not allowed to be on the ballot in both races. However, that year the seat did change parties for the fifth time in a row, with Richard Burr defeating Bill Clinton's onetime Chief of Staff Erskine Bowles.

Democratic primary election - May 4, 2010*
Party	Candidate	Votes	%
Democratic	Elaine Marshall	154,605	36.4%
Democratic	Cal Cunningham	115,851	27.3%
Democratic	Ken Lewis	72,510	17.1%
Democratic	Marcus W. Williams	35,984	8.5%
Democratic	Susan Harris	29,738	7.0%
Democratic	Ann Worthy	16,655	3.9%
Total votes		425,343	100.0%

* Note: Since no candidate received 40% of the vote on May 4, state law allowed a runoff (or "second primary") election if requested by the second-place finisher. Cunningham requested such a runoff.

Democratic primary election runoff (June 22, 2010)
Party	Candidate	Votes	%
Democratic	Elaine Marshall	95,390	60.0%
Democratic	Cal Cunningham	63,691	40.0%
Total votes		159,081	100.0%

Republican primary election - May 4, 2010
Party	Candidate	Votes	%
Republican	Richard Burr (Incumbent)	297,993	80.1%
Republican	Brad Jones	37,616	10.1%
Republican	Eddie Burks	22,111	5.9%
Republican	Larry Linney	14,248	3.8%
Total votes		371,968	100.0%

2010 United States Senate election in North Carolina
Party	Candidate	Votes	%	±%
Republican	Richard Burr (Incumbent)	1,458,046	54.81%	+3.21%
Democratic	Elaine Marshall	1,145,074	43.05%	−3.97%
Libertarian	Mike Beitler	55,682	2.09%	+0.72%
Majority		312,972	11.76%	
Total votes		2,660,079	100.00%	
Republican hold		Swing		

== North Dakota ==
North Dakota election
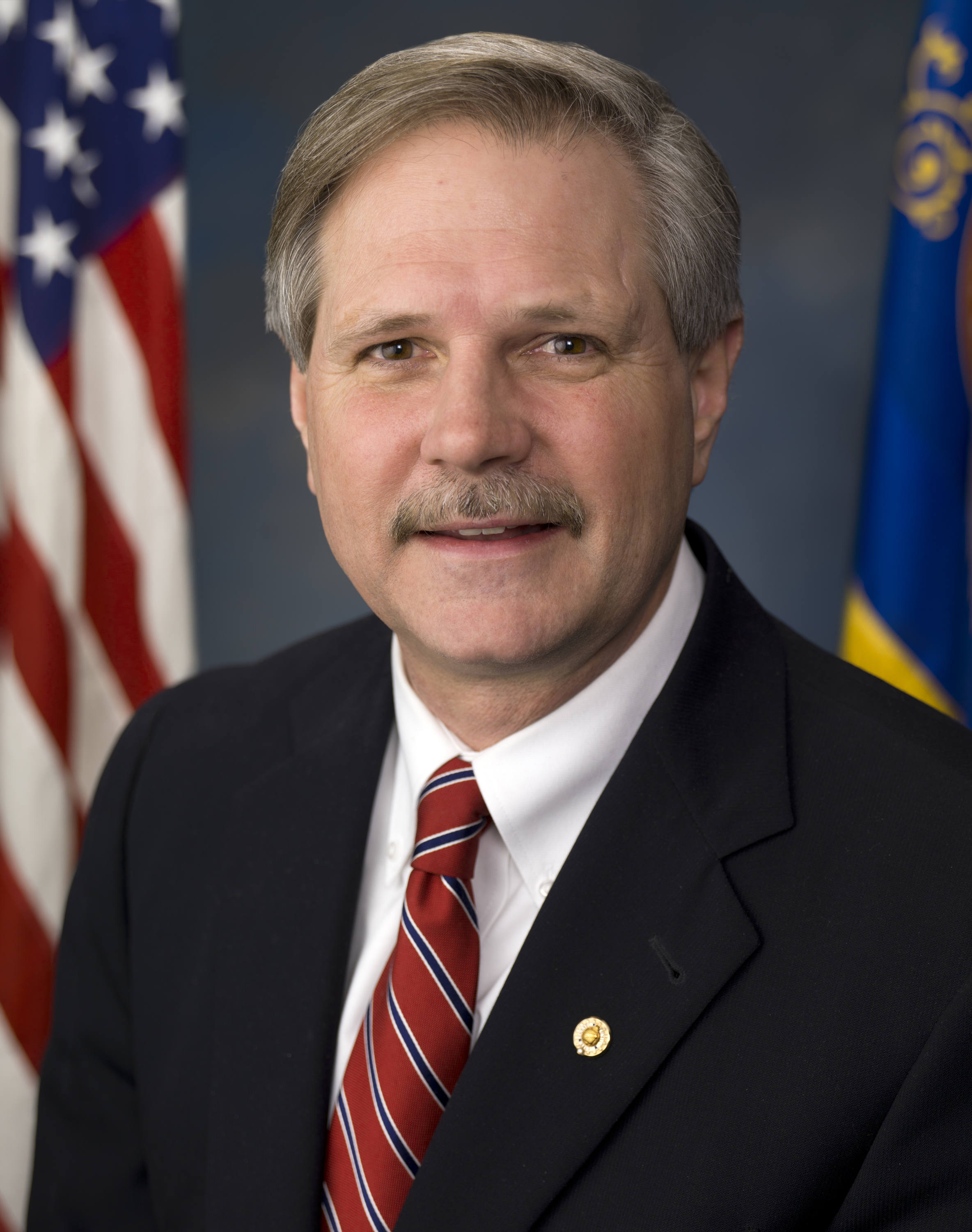

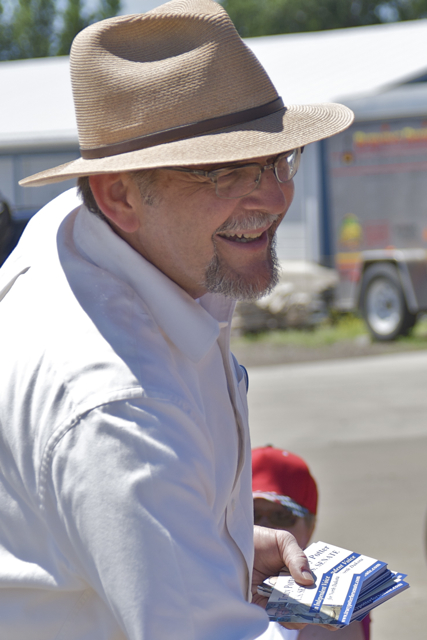
Nominee	John Hoeven	Tracy Potter
Party	Republican	Democratic–NPL
Popular vote	181,689	52,955
Percentage	76.1%	22.2%
- County results Hoeven: 50–60% 60–70% 70–80% 80–90%
U.S. senator before election
Byron Dorgan
Democratic–NPL
Elected U.S. Senator
John Hoeven
Republican

Incumbent Democrat Byron Dorgan did not seek re-election. Republican Governor John Hoeven won the open seat. Incumbent Byron Dorgan never had a difficult time getting elected, as he obtained 59%, 63%, and 68% in his three senate election bids, respectively. However, in December 2009, Rasmussen Reports conducted a hypothetical matchup of Governor John Hoeven against the incumbent. Hoeven led by a large margin, 58% to Dorgan's 36%. 61% of the state still had a favorable view of Dorgan, and if pitted against State Senator Duane Sand, the incumbent led 52% to 37%.

Hoeven was challenged in the race by North Dakota State Senator Tracy Potter of Bismarck. Potter received the endorsement of the North Dakota Democratic-NPL Party at its state convention on March 27, 2010. Governor Hoeven and Senator Potter advanced to the November 2, 2010 general election following balloting in North Dakota's primary election, which was held June 8, 2010. Neither candidate faced any significant opposition in the primary election.

Democratic-NPL primary election
Party	Candidate	Votes	%
Democratic–NPL	Tracy Potter	26,211	99.6%
Democratic–NPL	Write-ins	95	0.4%
Total votes		26,306	100.0%

Republican primary election
Party	Candidate	Votes	%
Republican	John Hoeven	64,978	99.8%
Republican	Timothy Beattie	130	0.2%
Total votes		65,108	100.0%

North Dakota election
Party	Candidate	Votes	%	±%
Republican	John Hoeven	181,689	76.08%	+44.36%
Democratic–NPL	Tracy Potter	52,955	22.17%	−46.11%
Libertarian	Keith Hanson	3,890	1.63%	N/A
Majority		128,734	53.91%	
Turnout		238,534	100.00%	
Republican gain from Democratic–NPL		Swing		

== Ohio ==
Ohio election
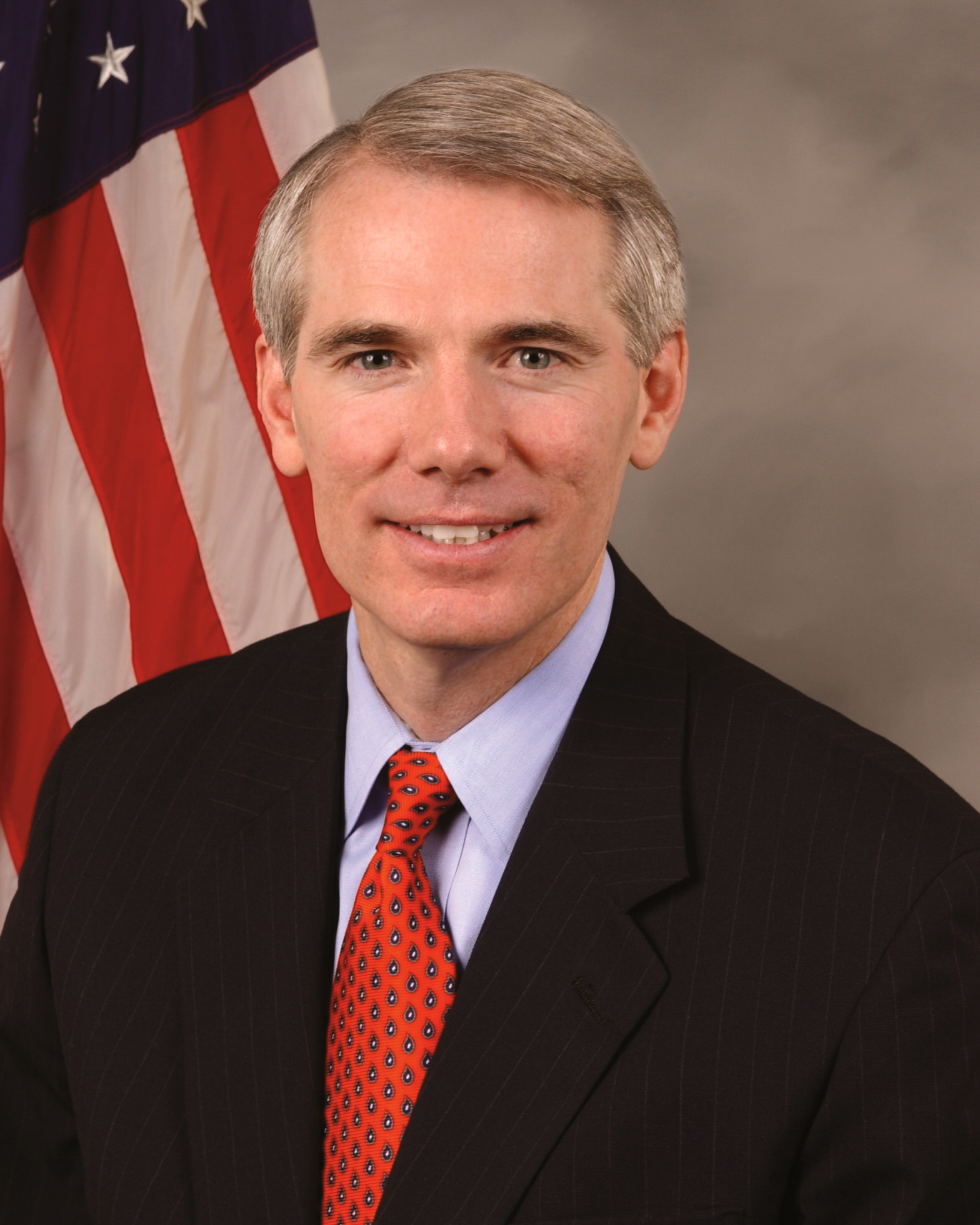

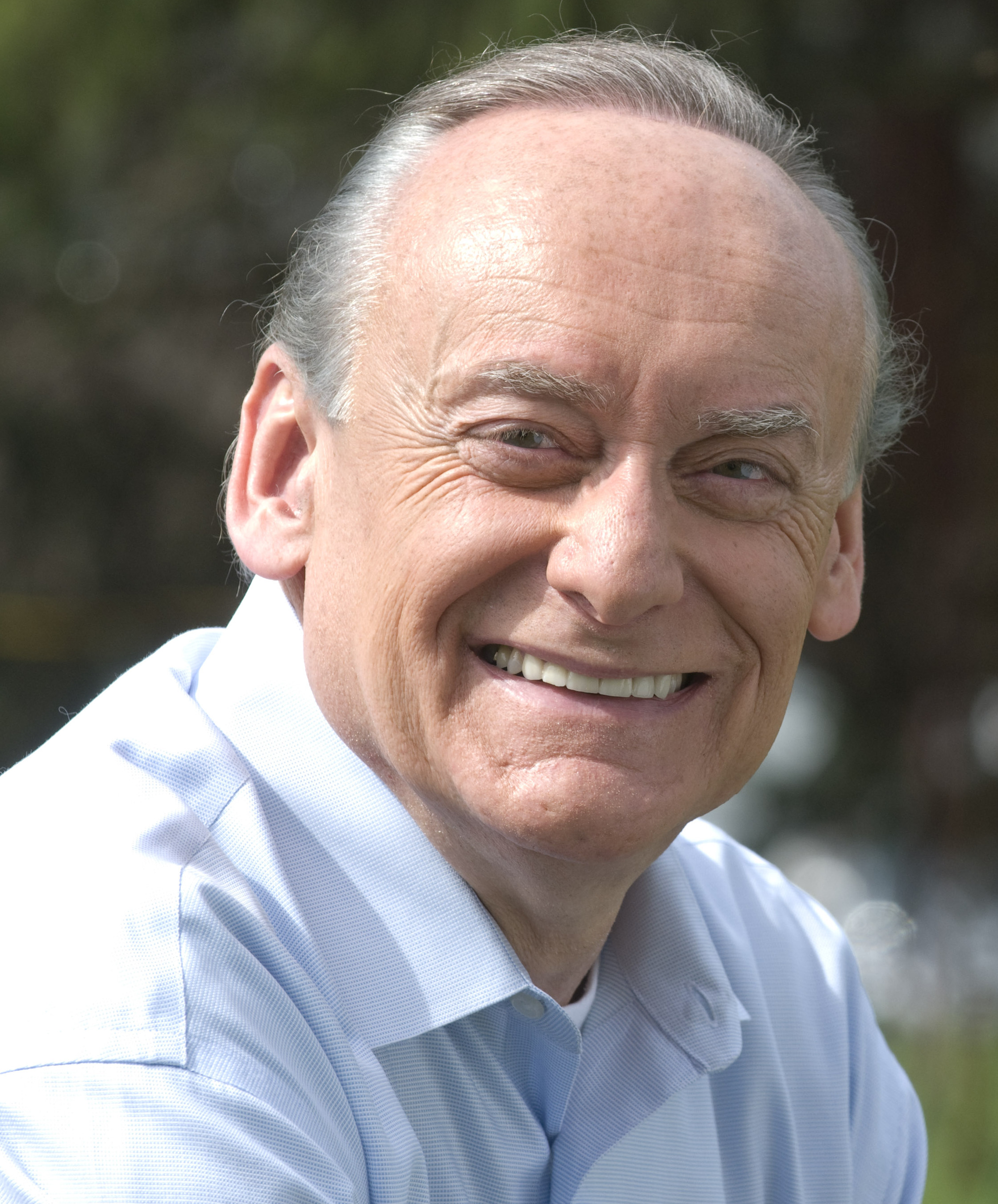
Nominee	Rob Portman	Lee Fisher
Party	Republican	Democratic
Popular vote	2,125,810	1,448,092
Percentage	56.8%	39.4%
- Portman: 40–50% 50–60% 60–70% 70–80% Fisher: 50–60%
U.S. senator before election
George Voinovich
Republican
Elected U.S. Senator
Rob Portman
Republican

Incumbent Republican George Voinovich retired instead of seeking a third term. Republican former Director of the Office of Management and Budget, United States Trade Representative, and Congressman Rob Portman won the open seat.

Democratic primary election
Party	Candidate	Votes	%
Democratic	Lee Irwin Fisher	380,189	55.6%
Democratic	Jennifer Lee Brunner	304,026	44.4%
Total votes		684,206	100.0%

Republican primary election
Party	Candidate	Votes	%
Republican	Rob Portman	667,369	100.00%
Total votes		657,354	100.00%

Originally, the election was seen as a toss-up. His experience as a former Bush official was considered to be a big problem for Portman. Both President Barack Obama and Vice President Joe Biden campaigned for Fisher. Television advertisements were very negative. Fisher attacked Portman for helping to ship jobs overseas during his entire political career, backing deals that shipped jobs overseas, and the trade deficit with China, which grew by over $41 billion. Portman claimed in response that most jobs were being lost to other states, not countries. Portman attacked Fisher for supporting Obama's stimulus and cap and trade.

Winning the election, Portman received the majority of votes in 82 of 88 counties and in 15 of 18 Congressional districts, including the district of liberal U.S. Congressman Dennis Kucinich.

2010 United States Senate election in Ohio
Party	Candidate	Votes	%	±%
Republican	Robert Jones Portman	2,168,742	56.85%	−6.61%
Democratic	Lee Irwin Fisher	1,503,297	39.40%	+2.85%
Constitution	Eric Deaton	65,856	1.72%	N/A
Independent	Michael Pryce	50,101	1.31%	N/A
Socialist	Daniel LaBotz	26,454	0.69%	N/A
N/A	Arthur Sullivan (write-in)	648	0.02%	N/A
Majority		665,445	17.44%	
Total votes		3,815,098	100.00%	
Republican hold		Swing	NA	

== Oklahoma ==
Oklahoma election
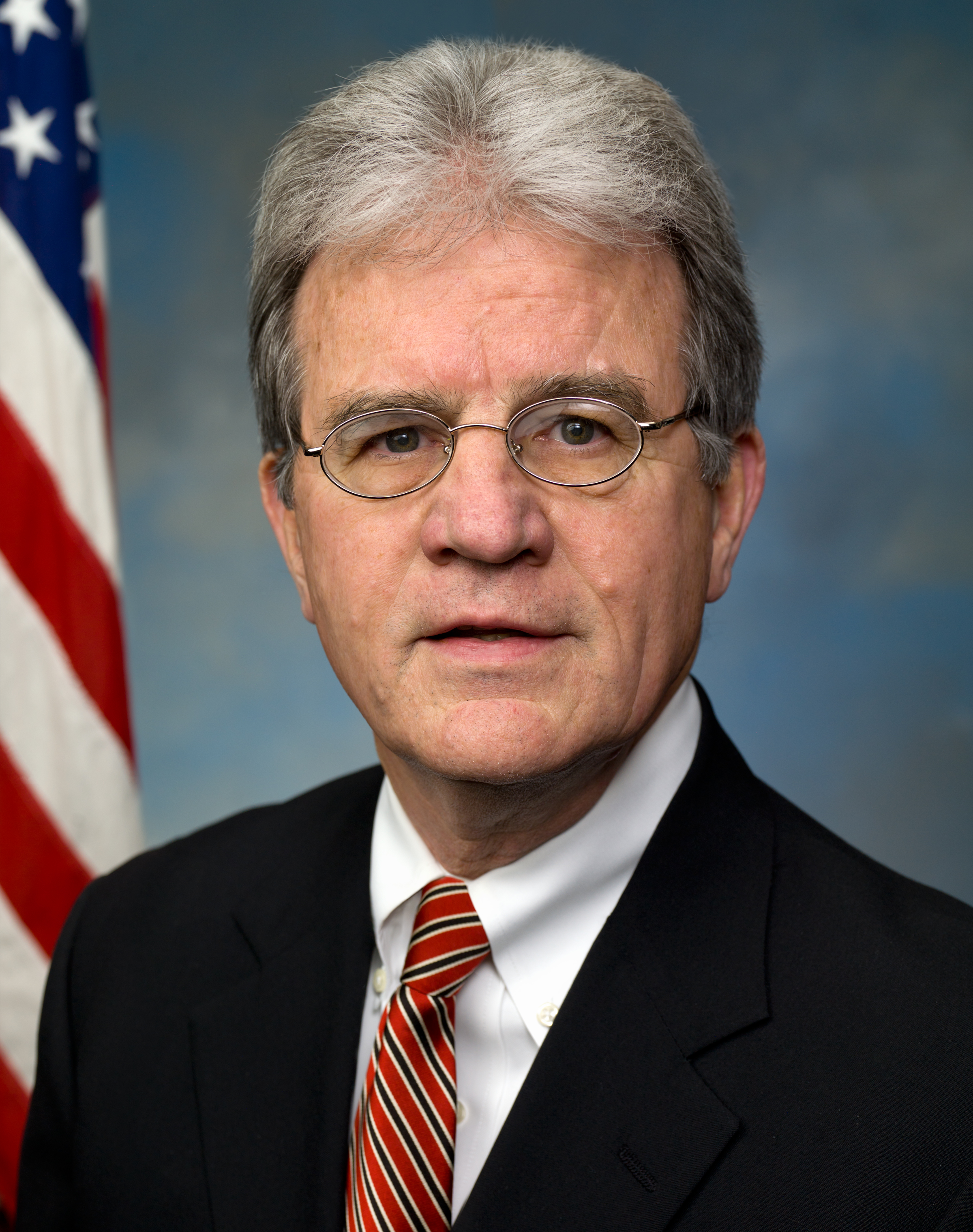

Nominee	Tom Coburn	Jim Rogers
Party	Republican	Democratic
Popular vote	718,482	265,814
Percentage	70.6%	26.1%
- County results Coburn: 60–70% 70–80% 80–90%
U.S. senator before election
Tom Coburn
Republican
Elected U.S. Senator
Tom Coburn
Republican

Incumbent first-term Republican Tom Coburn won re-election to a second term. Coburn, a very popular incumbent, promised to limit himself to two terms. Despite his popularity, he did release television advertisements. In 2009, Coburn's approval rating in a PPP poll was 59%, including a 39% approval rating among Democrats. His Democratic opponent is a perennial candidate who did little campaigning.

Democratic primary election
Party	Candidate	Votes	%
Democratic	Jim Rogers	157,955	65.4%
Democratic	Mark Myles	83,715	34.6%
Total votes		241,670	100.0%

Republican primary election
Party	Candidate	Votes	%
Republican	Tom Coburn (Incumbent)	223,997	90.4%
Republican	Evelyn Rogers	15,093	6.1%
Republican	Lewis Kelly Spring	8,812	3.5%
Total votes		247,902	100.00%

Oklahoma election
Party	Candidate	Votes	%	±%
Republican	Tom Coburn (Incumbent)	718,482	70.64%	+17.87%
Democratic	Jim Rogers	265,814	26.13%	−15.11%
Independent	Stephen Wallace	25,048	2.46%	N/A
Independent	Ronald F. Dwyer	7,807	0.77%	N/A
Majority		452,668	44.50%	
Total votes		1,017,151	100.00%	
Republican hold		Swing		

== Oregon ==
Oregon election
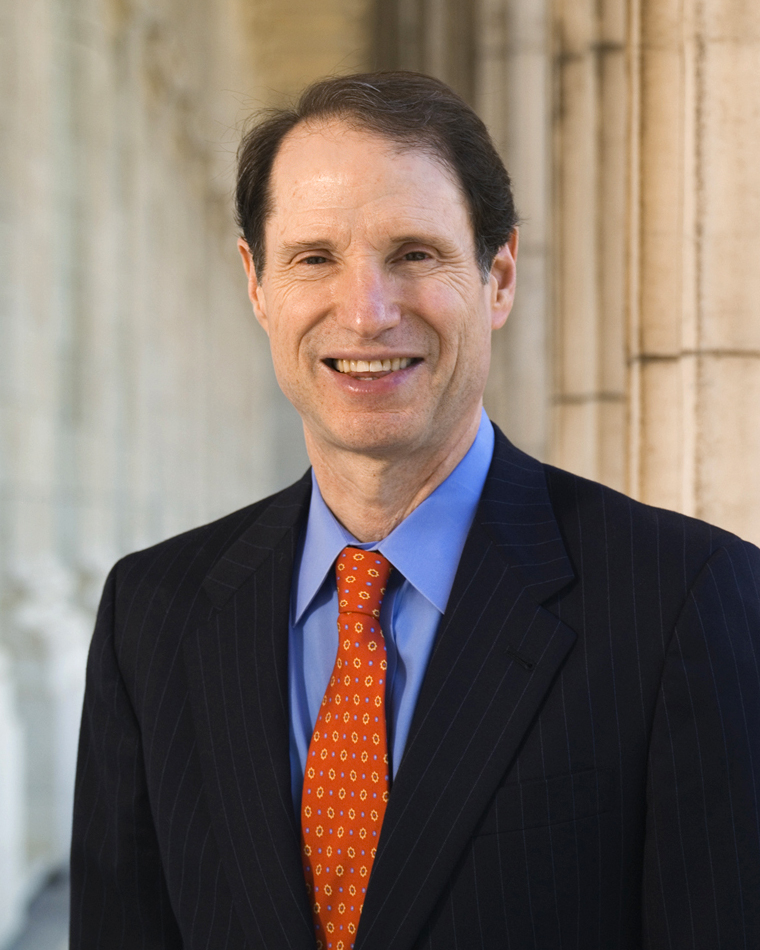

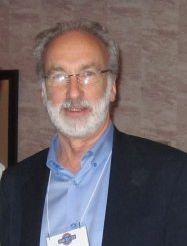
Nominee	Ron Wyden	Jim Huffman
Party	Democratic	Republican
Popular vote	825,507	566,199
Percentage	57.2%	39.3%
- County results Wyden: 40-50% 50–60% 60–70% 70–80% Huffman: 40–50% 50–60% 60–70%
U.S. senator before election
Ron Wyden
Democratic
Elected U.S. Senator
Ron Wyden
Democratic

Incumbent Democrat Ron Wyden won re-election to a third full term. Wyden, a popular incumbent with a 52% approval rating in a July poll, touted bipartisanship and promised to hold town-hall meetings annually in each of Oregon's 36 counties and to open offices outside of Portland and Salem. A Survey USA poll taken a few days before the election showed that 23% of Republicans supported Wyden.

Huffman, widely considered as an underdog, financed his own campaign. He defended bonuses for Wall Street executives and questioned global warming.

Democratic primary election
Party	Candidate	Votes	%
Democratic	Ron Wyden (incumbent)	323,652	89.55%
Democratic	Loren Hooker	25,152	6.75%
Democratic	Pavel Goberman	9,985	2.68%
Democratic	Write-ins	3,782	1.02%
Total votes		376,353	100.00%

Republican primary election
Party	Candidate	Votes	%
Republican	Jim Huffman	110,450	41.70%
Republican	Loren Later	39,753	15.01%
Republican	G. Shane Dinkel	36,760	13.88%
Republican	Thomas Stutzman	31,859	12.03%
Republican	Keith Waldron	24,602	9.29%
Republican	Robin Parker	14,637	5.53%
Republican	Walter Woodland	4,417	1.67%
Republican	Write-ins	2,213	0.86%
Total votes		267,054	100%

Oregon election
Party	Candidate	Votes	%
Democratic	Ron Wyden (Incumbent)	825,507	57.22%
Republican	Jim Huffman	566,199	39.25%
Working Families	Bruce Cronk	18,940	1.31%
Libertarian	Marc Delphine	16,028	1.11%
Progressive	Rick Staggenborg	14,466	1.00%
Write-In		1,448	0.10%
Total votes		1,442,588	100.0%
Democratic hold			

== Pennsylvania ==
Pennsylvania election
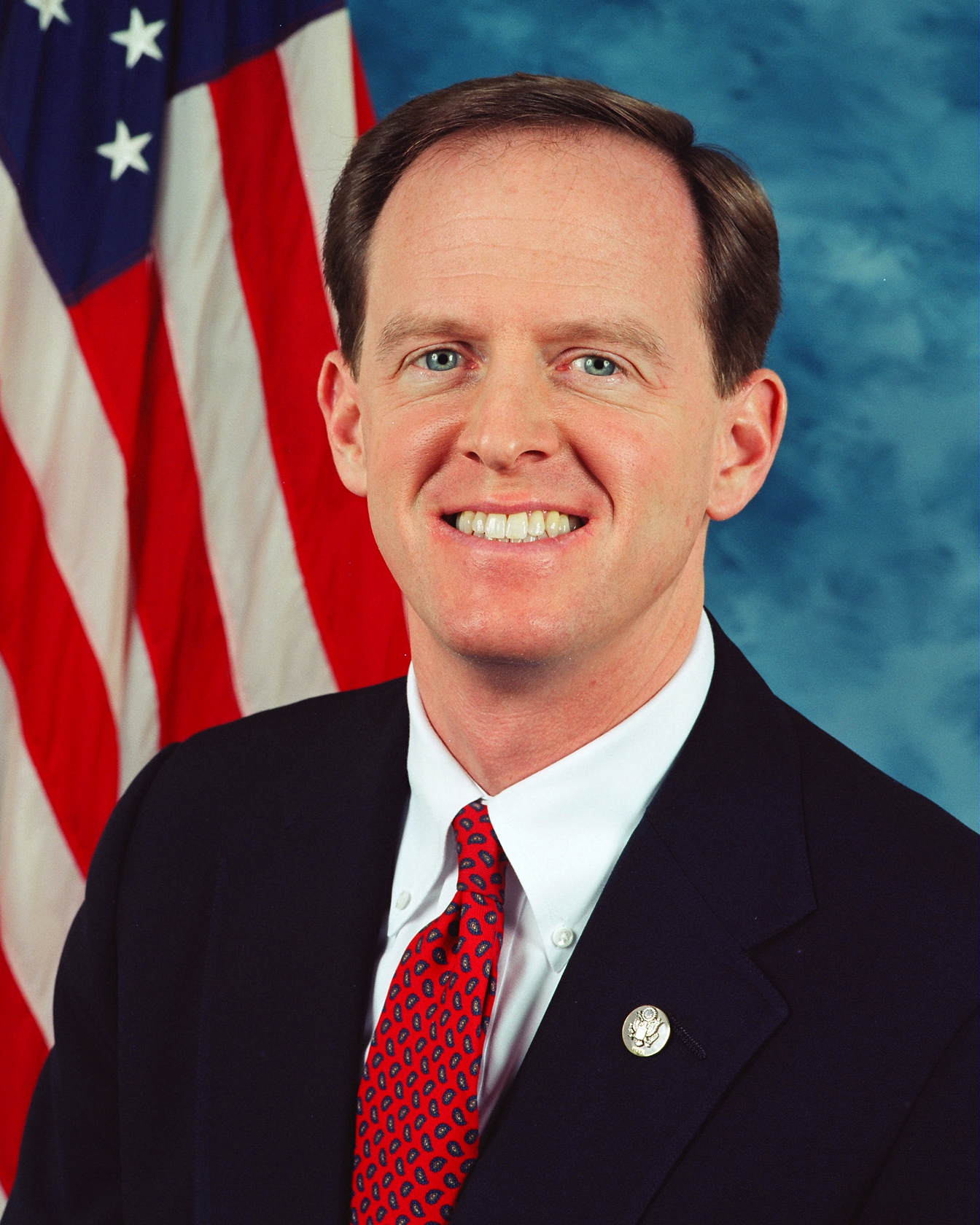

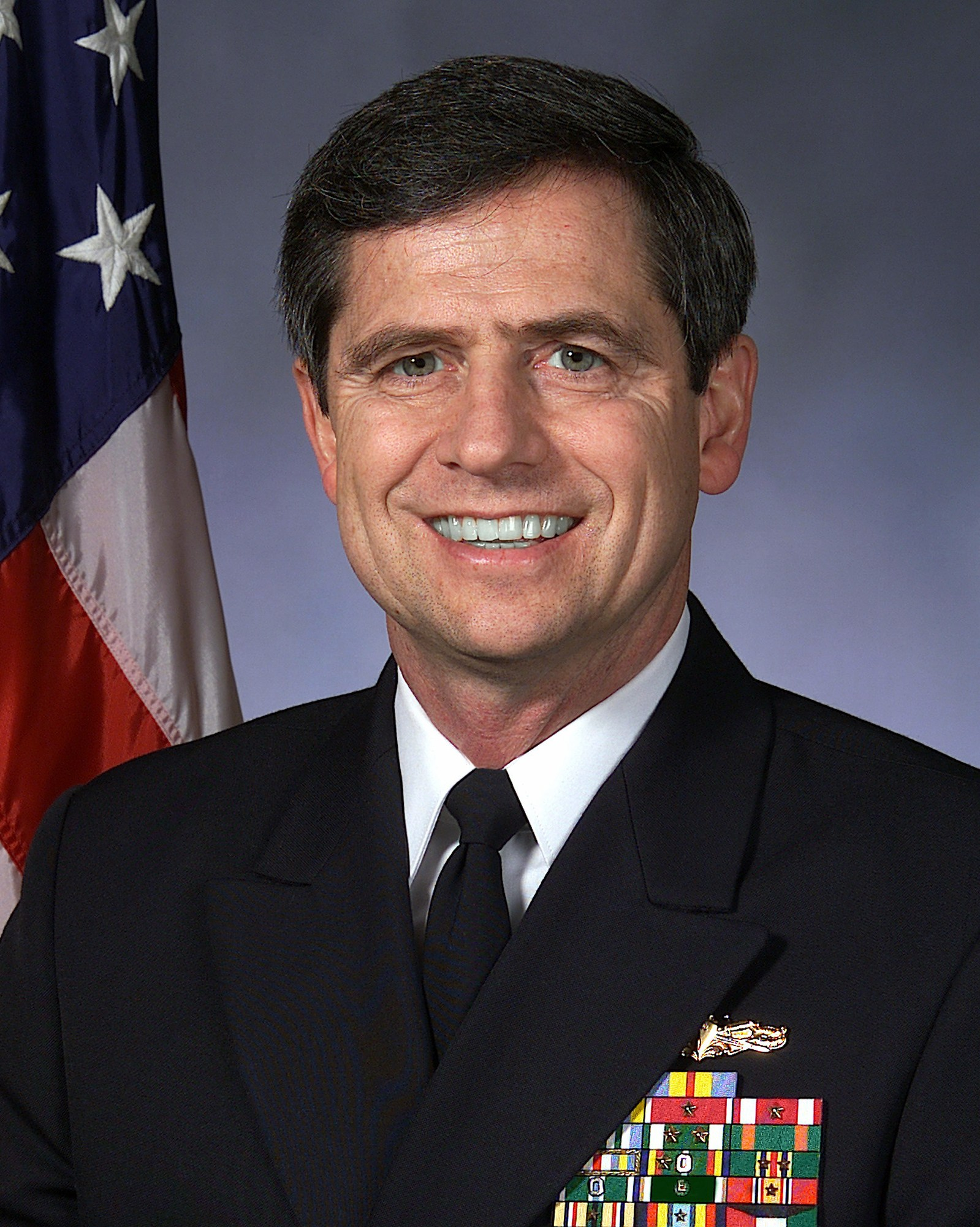
Nominee	Pat Toomey	Joe Sestak
Party	Republican	Democratic
Popular vote	2,028,945	1,948,716
Percentage	51.0%	49.0%
- Toomey: 50–60% 60–70% 70–80% Sestak: 50–60% 80–90%
U.S. senator before election
Arlen Specter
Democratic
Elected U.S. Senator
Pat Toomey
Republican

Incumbent Republican-turned-Democrat Arlen Specter ran for re-election to a sixth term, but he lost in the Democratic primary to Joe Sestak. Republican nominee Pat Toomey then won the seat.

Democratic primary election
Party	Candidate	Votes	%
Democratic	Joe Sestak	568,563	53.9%
Democratic	Arlen Specter (Incumbent)	487,217	46.1%
Total votes		1,055,780	100.00%

Pennsylvania election
Party	Candidate	Votes	%	±%
Republican	Pat Toomey	2,028,945	51.01%	−1.61%
Democratic	Joe Sestak	1,948,716	48.99%	+7.00%
Majority		80,229	2.02%	
Total votes		3,977,661	100.00%	
Republican gain from Democratic		Swing		

== South Carolina ==
South Carolina election
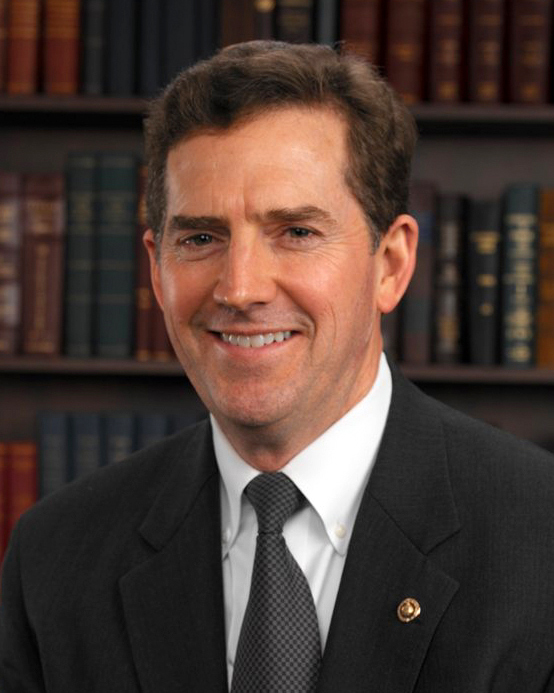

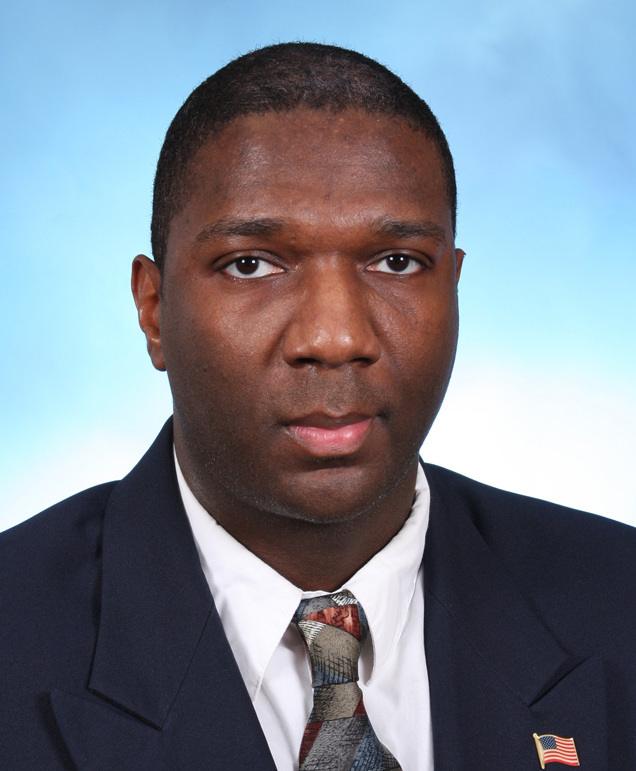
Nominee	Jim DeMint	Alvin Greene
Party	Republican	Democratic
Popular vote	810,771	364,598
Percentage	61.5%	27.7%
Nominee	Tom Clements
Party	Green
Popular vote	121,472
Percentage	9.2%
- DeMint: 40–50% 50–60% 60–70% 70–80% Greene: 40–50% 50–60% 60–70%
U.S. senator before election
Jim DeMint
Republican
Elected U.S. Senator
Jim DeMint
Republican

Incumbent Republican Jim DeMint won re-election to a second term. Alvin Greene, the Democratic nominee, was the first major-party African-American U.S. Senate candidate in South Carolina since Reconstruction. Alvin Greene's Democratic primary election win and his margin of victory surprised pundits. As of the primary, he had held no public campaign events, raised no money, and did not have a campaign website. A review of the primary election showed that of the state's 46 counties, half had a significant gap between the absentee and primary day ballots. For example, in Lancaster County, Vic Rawl won the absentees with 84 percent, while Greene won primary day by a double-digit margin. Rawl's campaign manager also claimed, "In only two of 88 precincts, do the number of votes Greene got plus the number we got equal the total cast."

Democratic primary election
Party	Candidate	Votes	%
Democratic	Alvin Greene	100,362	59.0%
Democratic	Vic Rawl	69,853	41.0%
Total votes		170,215	100.0%

Republican primary election
Party	Candidate	Votes	%
Republican	Jim DeMint (Incumbent)	342,464	83.0%
Republican	Susan McDonald Gaddy	70,194	17.0%
Total votes		412,658	100.0%

2010 United States Senate election in South Carolina
Party	Candidate	Votes	%	±%
Republican	Jim DeMint (Incumbent)	810,771	61.48%	+7.81%
Democratic	Alvin Greene	364,598	27.65%	−16.46%
Green	Tom Clements	121,472	9.21%	+8.95%
	Write-ins	21,953	1.66%	+1.58%
Majority		446,173	33.83%	+24.33%
Total votes		1,318,794	50.12%	-18.88%
Republican hold		Swing		

== South Dakota ==
South Dakota election
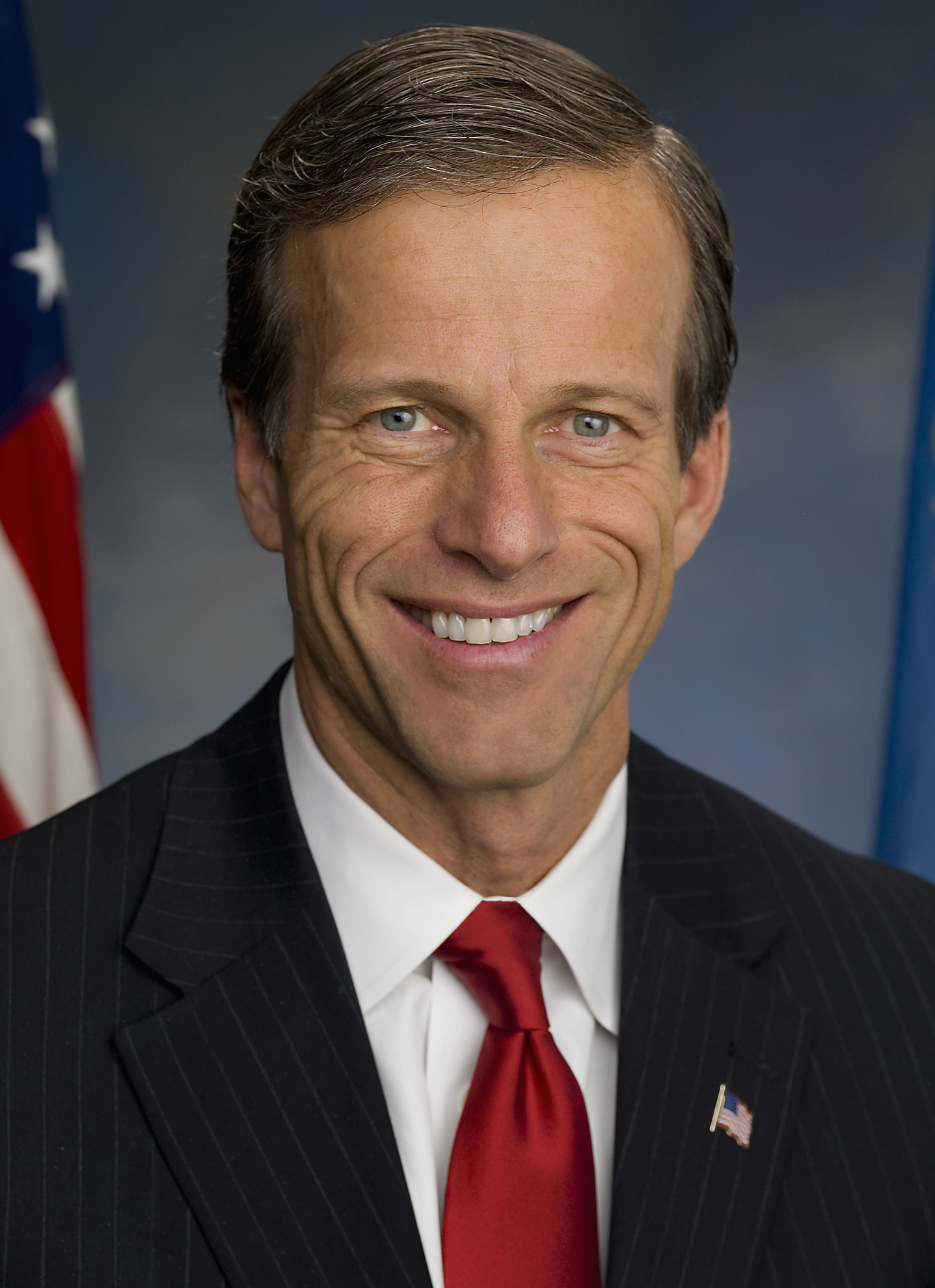
Nominee	John Thune
Party	Republican
Popular vote	227,947
Percentage	100.0%
- County results Thune: 100%
U.S. senator before election
John Thune
Republican
Elected U.S. Senator
John Thune
Republican

Incumbent Republican John Thune won re-election to a second term unopposed.

Thune was narrowly elected to his first term over Democratic Senate Minority Leader Tom Daschle with 51% of the vote in 2004. In spite of his lack of seniority, Thune rose to the position of chairman of the Republican Policy Committee in the United States Senate.

No members of the South Dakota Democratic Party (or any other party) filed to challenge Thune. Scott Heidepriem, the South Dakota Senate Minority Leader and a Democratic candidate for Governor of South Dakota, said, "We just concluded that John Thune is an extremely popular senator who is going to win another term in the Senate."

== Utah ==
Utah election
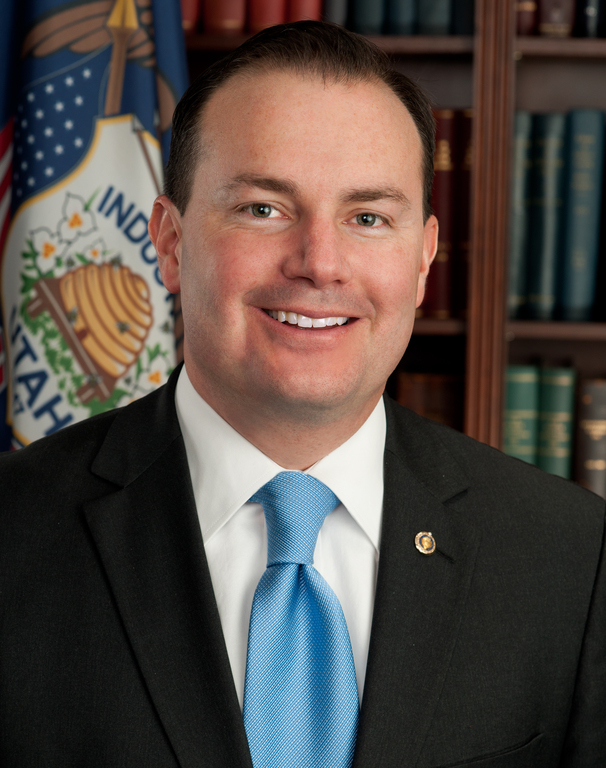
Nominee	Mike Lee	Sam Granato
Party	Republican	Democratic
Popular vote	390,179	207,685
Percentage	61.6%	32.8%
Nominee	Scott Bradley
Party	Constitution
Popular vote	35,937
Percentage	5.7%
- County results Lee: 40–50% 50–60% 60–70% 70–80% 80–90% Granato: 50–60%
U.S. senator before election
Bob Bennett
Republican
Elected U.S. Senator
Mike Lee
Republican

Incumbent Republican Bob Bennett was seeking re-election to a fourth term, but was eliminated in the GOP state convention. Republican Mike Lee, who won the Republican primary, won the open seat.

At the Republican convention, incumbent Senator Bob Bennett finished third in balloting among delegates and was eliminated from the race. Business owner Tim Bridgewater finished first and attorney Mike Lee finished second, but Bridgewater did not receive enough votes to avoid a primary election runoff against Lee. At the Democratic convention, delegates nominated businessman Sam Granato, who received 77.5 percent of the vote.

Republican primary election
Party	Candidate	Votes	%
Republican	Mike Lee	98,512	51.2%
Republican	Tim Bridgewater	93,905	48.8%
Total votes		192,417	100.0%

Democratic convention
Party	Candidate	Votes	%
Democratic	Sam Granato	77	77.5%
Democratic	Christopher Stout	23	22.5%
Total votes		100	100.0%

Utah election
Party	Candidate	Votes	%	±%
Republican	Mike Lee	390,179	61.56%	−7.18%
Democratic	Sam Granato	207,685	32.77%	+4.37%
Constitution	Scott Bradley	35,937	5.67%	+3.78%
Majority		182,494	28.79%	
Total votes		633,801	100.00%	
Republican hold		Swing		

== Vermont ==
Vermont election
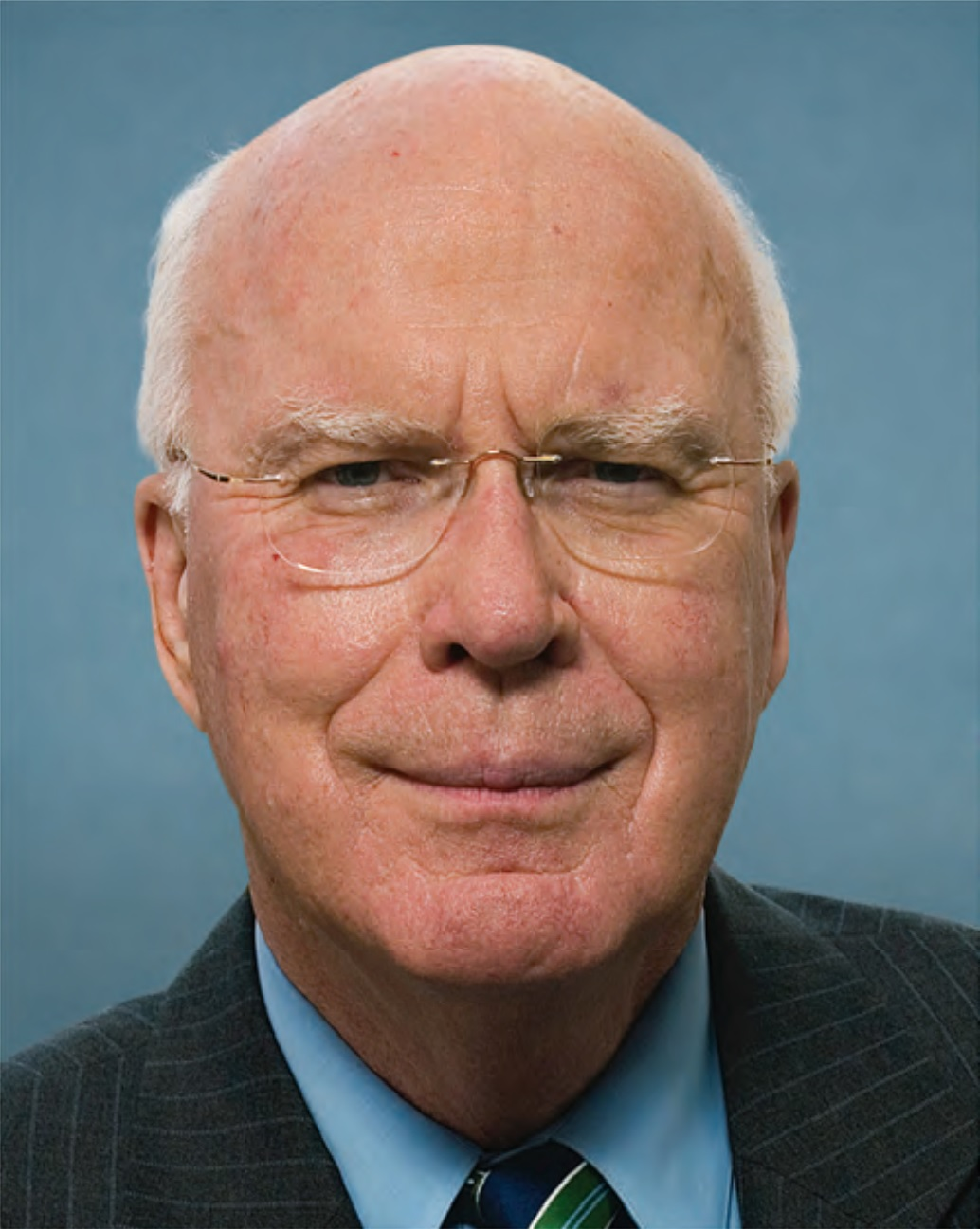

Nominee	Patrick Leahy	Len Britton
Party	Democratic	Republican
Popular vote	151,281	72,699
Percentage	64.36%	30.93%
- Leahy: 30-40% 40-50% 50-60% 60-70% 70-80% 80-90% Britton: 40-50% 50-60%
U.S. senator before election
Patrick Leahy
Democratic
Elected U.S. Senator
Patrick Leahy
Democratic

Incumbent Democrat Patrick Leahy easily won re-election to a seventh term.

Democratic primary election
Party	Candidate	Votes	%
Democratic	Patrick Leahy (Incumbent)	64,177	89.06%
Democratic	Daniel Frielich	7,886	10.94%
Total votes		72,063	100.0%

2010 United States Senate election in Vermont
Party	Candidate	Votes	%	±%
Democratic	Patrick Leahy (Incumbent)	151,281	64.36%	−6.27%
Republican	Len Britton	72,699	30.93%	+6.38%
Independent	Daniel Freilich	3,544	1.51%	N/A
Marijuana	Cris Ericson	2,731	1.16%	N/A
Independent	Stephen Cain	2,356	1.00%	N/A
Socialist	Peter Diamondstone	1,433	0.61%	N/A
Independent	Johenry Nunes	1,021	0.43%	N/A
Majority		78,528	33.43%	
Total votes		235,065	100.00%	
Democratic hold		Swing		

== Washington ==
Washington election
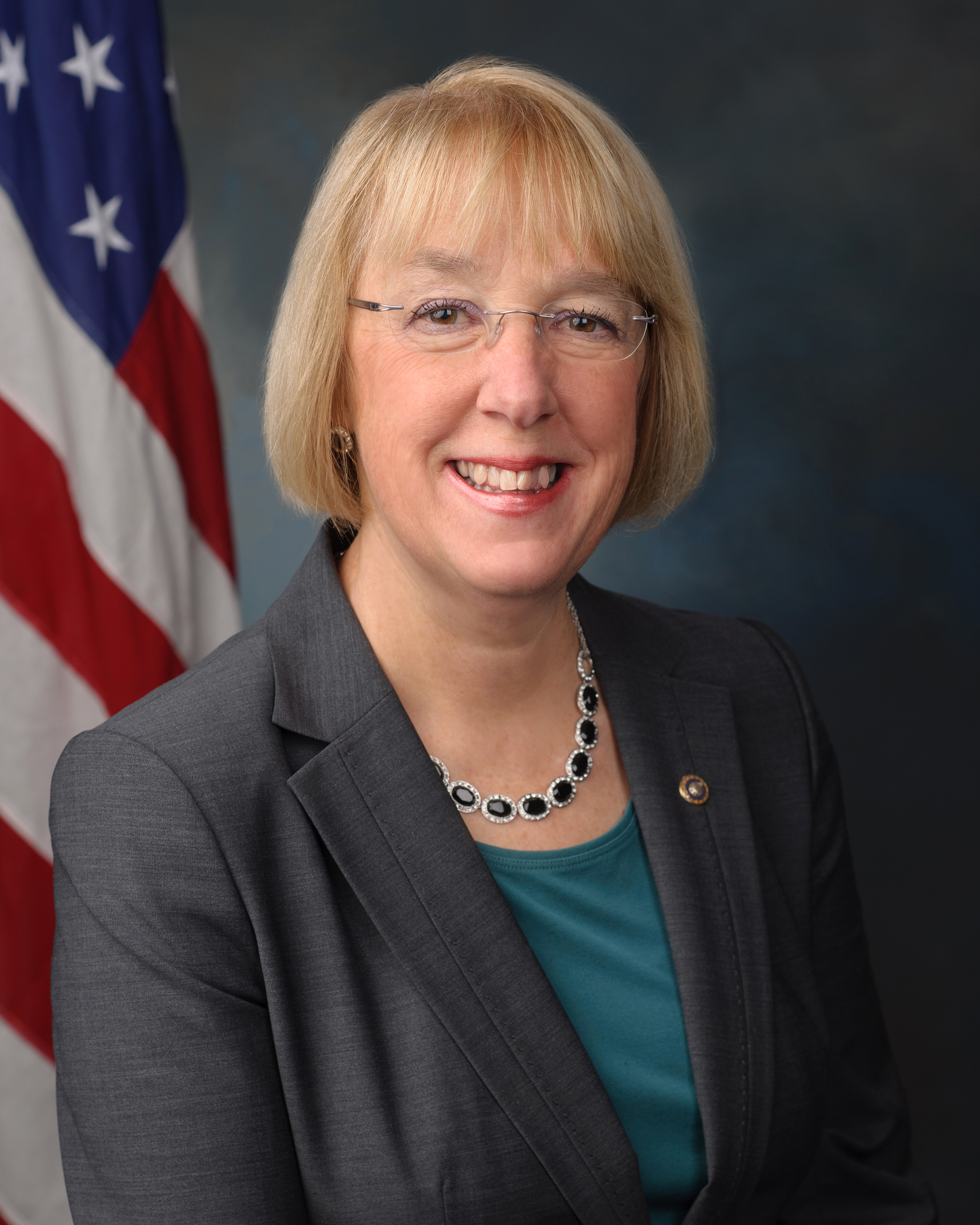

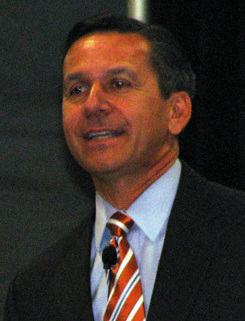
Nominee	Patty Murray	Dino Rossi
Party	Democratic	Republican
Popular vote	1,314,930	1,196,164
Percentage	52.4%	47.6%
- County results Murray: 50–60% 60–70% Rossi: 40–50% 50–60% 60–70% 70–80%
U.S. senator before election
Patty Murray
Democratic
Elected U.S. Senator
Patty Murray
Democratic

Incumbent Democrat Patty Murray won re-election to a fourth term.

Republican Dino Rossi heavily criticized Murray for her support of the 2009 economic stimulus package; however, Rossi's economic promises are nearly identical to those of President Bush who asked for the stimulus. Rossi supports repealing the Patient Protection and Affordable Care Act and the Dodd-Frank Wall Street Reform and Consumer Protection Act. He also criticized Murray for her support for earmarks. In response, Murray said, "You bet that seniority and leadership has a big thing to do with it, but the other part of it is, I get up every day and I work hard and I believe in this and I am going to continue fighting for the community I represent."

Washington Blanket primary election
Party	Candidate	Votes	%
Democratic	Patty Murray (Incumbent)	670,284	46.22%
Republican	Dino Rossi	483,305	33.33%
Republican	Clint Didier	185,034	12.76%
Republican	Paul Akers	37,231	2.57%
Independent	Skip Mercer	12,122	0.84%
Democratic	Charles Allen	11,525	0.79%
Democratic	Bob Burr	11,344	0.78%
Republican	Norma Gruber	9,162	0.63%
Republican	Michael Latimer	6,545	0.45%
Democratic	Mike the Mover	6,019	0.42%
Democratic	Goodspaceguy	4,718	0.33%
Reform	William Baker	4,593	0.32%
Independent	Mohammad Said	3,387	0.23%
Independent	Schalk Leonard	2,818	0.19%
Republican	William Chovil	2,039	0.14%
Total votes		1,450,126	100.00%

Washington General election
Party	Candidate	Votes	%
Democratic	Patty Murray (Incumbent)	1,314,930	52.36%
Republican	Dino Rossi	1,196,164	47.64%
Total votes		2,511,094	100.00%
Turnout			71.24%

== West Virginia (special) ==
West Virginia special election
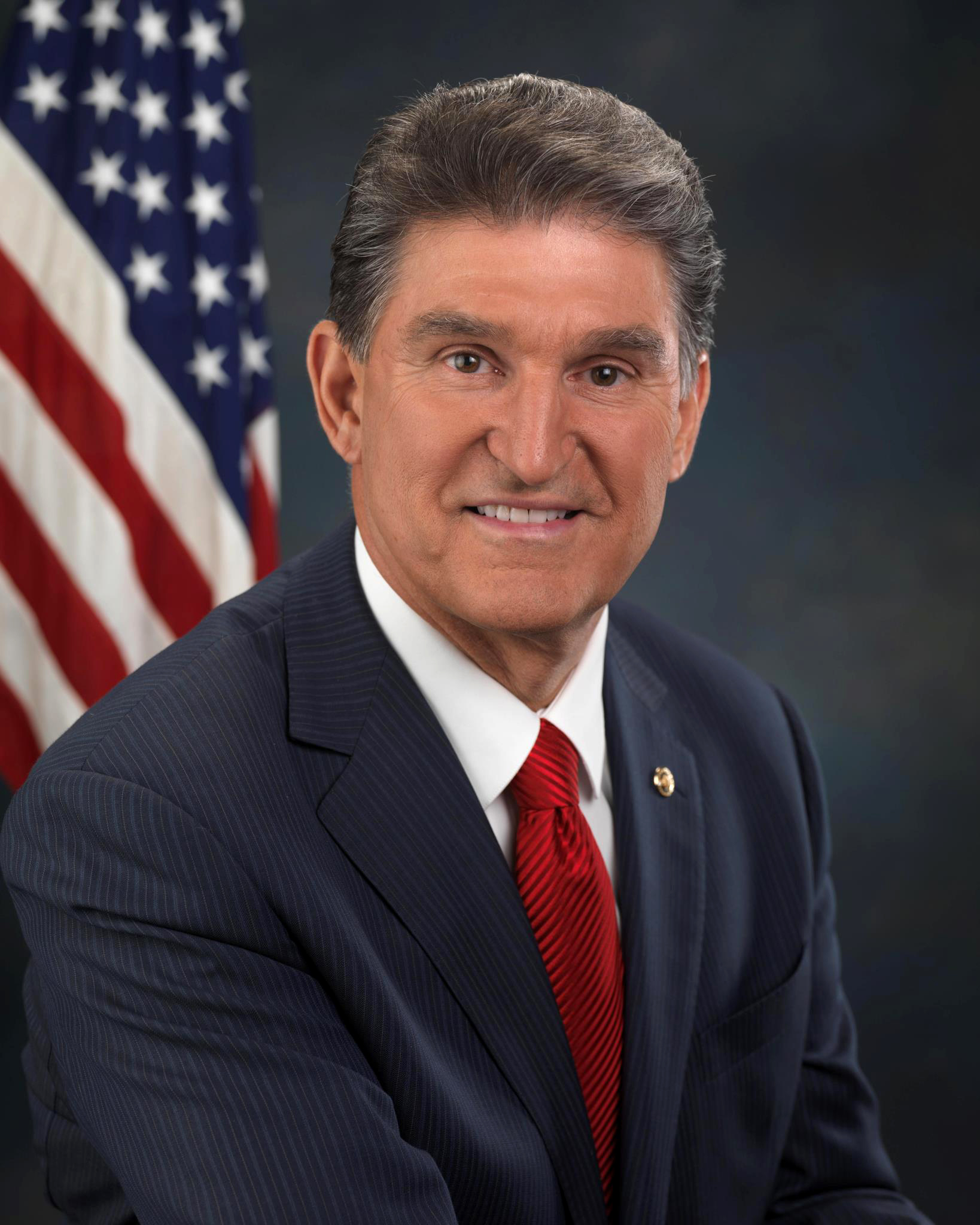

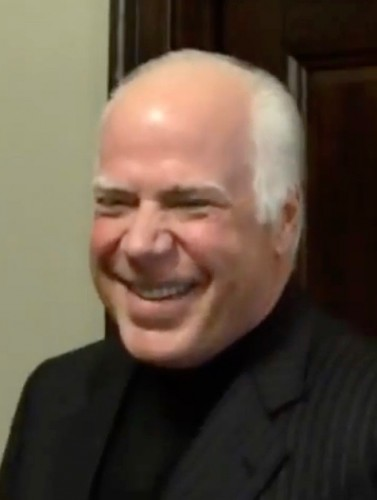
Nominee	Joe Manchin	John Raese
Party	Democratic	Republican
Popular vote	283,358	230,013
Percentage	53.5%	43.4%
- County results Manchin: 40–50% 50–60% 60–70% 70–80% Raese: 50–60% 60–70% 70–80%
U.S. senator before election
Carte Goodwin
Democratic
Elected U.S. Senator
Joe Manchin
Democratic

Long-time Democratic Senator Robert Byrd died June 28, 2010, and Democratic Governor Joe Manchin appointed Carte Goodwin to temporarily fill the vacancy. Goodwin pledged to not run for election to the seat in exchange for the appointment. Manchin won the open seat and served out the remainder of Byrd's elected term, which ended on January 3, 2013.

During the Republican primary campaign, only Raese and Warner released television advertisements.

West Virginia Democratic primary election
Party	Candidate	Votes	%
Democratic	Joe Manchin	67,498	72.9%
Democratic	Ken Hechler	16,039	17.3%
Democratic	Sheirl Fletcher	9,035	9.8%
Total votes		92,572	100%

West Virginia Republican primary election
Party	Candidate	Votes	%
Republican	John Raese	38,152	71.4%
Republican	Mac Warner	7,892	14.8%
Republican	Scott H. Williams	1,530	2.9%
Republican	Kenneth Culp	1,364	2.6%
Republican	Harry C. Bruner Jr.	1,283	2.4%
Republican	Thomas Ressler	1,184	2.2%
Republican	Lynette Kennedy McQuain	907	1.7%
Republican	Frank Kubic	462	0.9%
Republican	Daniel Scott Rebich	450	0.8%
Republican	Albert Howard	176	0.3%
Total votes		53,400	100%

2010 United States Senate special election in West Virginia results
Party	Candidate	Votes	%	±%
Democratic	Joe Manchin	283,358	53.47%	−10.96%
Republican	John Raese	230,013	43.40%	+9.69%
Mountain	Jesse Johnson	10,152	1.92%	+0.06%
Constitution	Jeff Becker	6,425	1.21%	N/A
Majority		53,345	10.07%	
Total votes		529,948	100%	
Democratic hold		Swing		

== Wisconsin ==
Wisconsin election
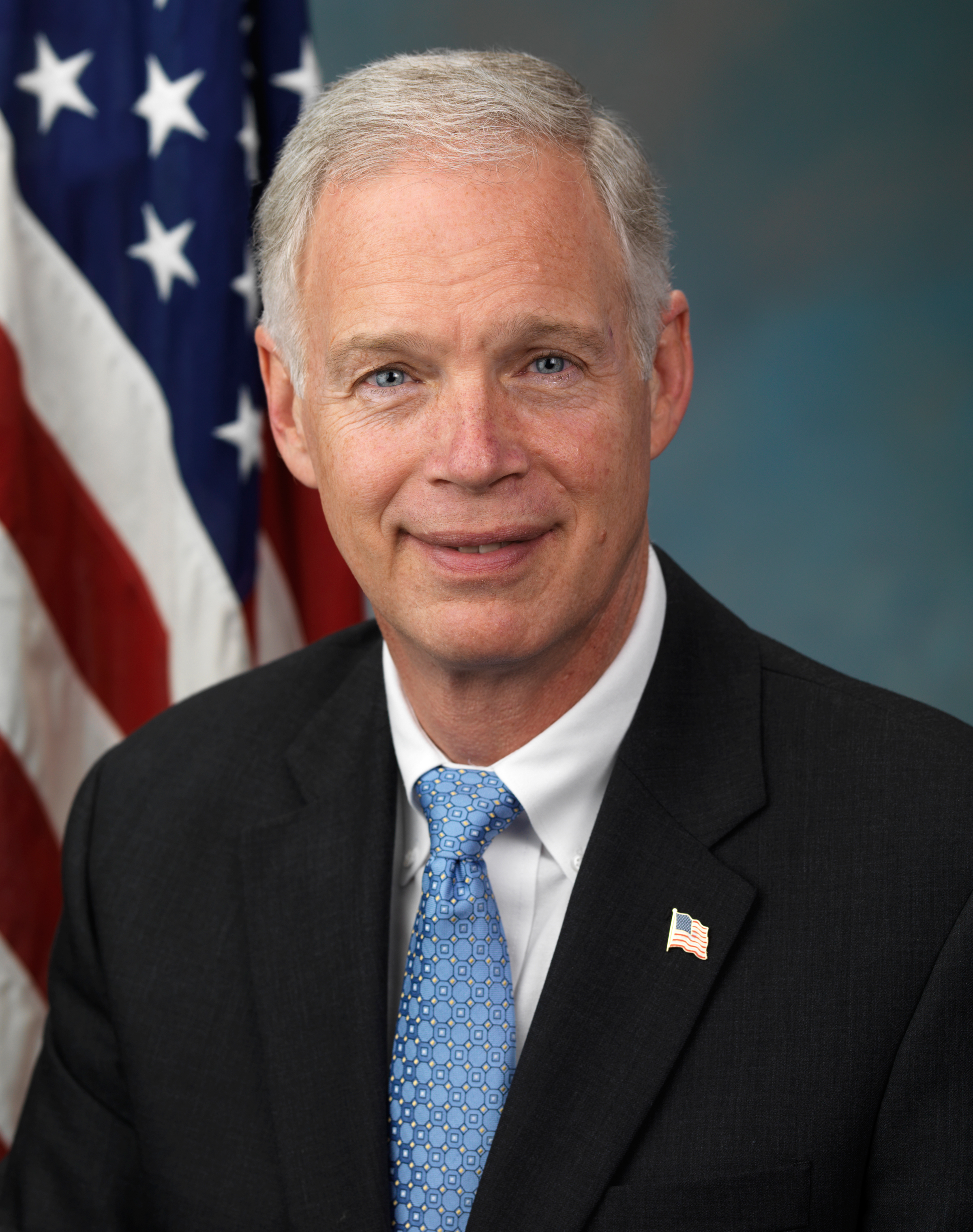

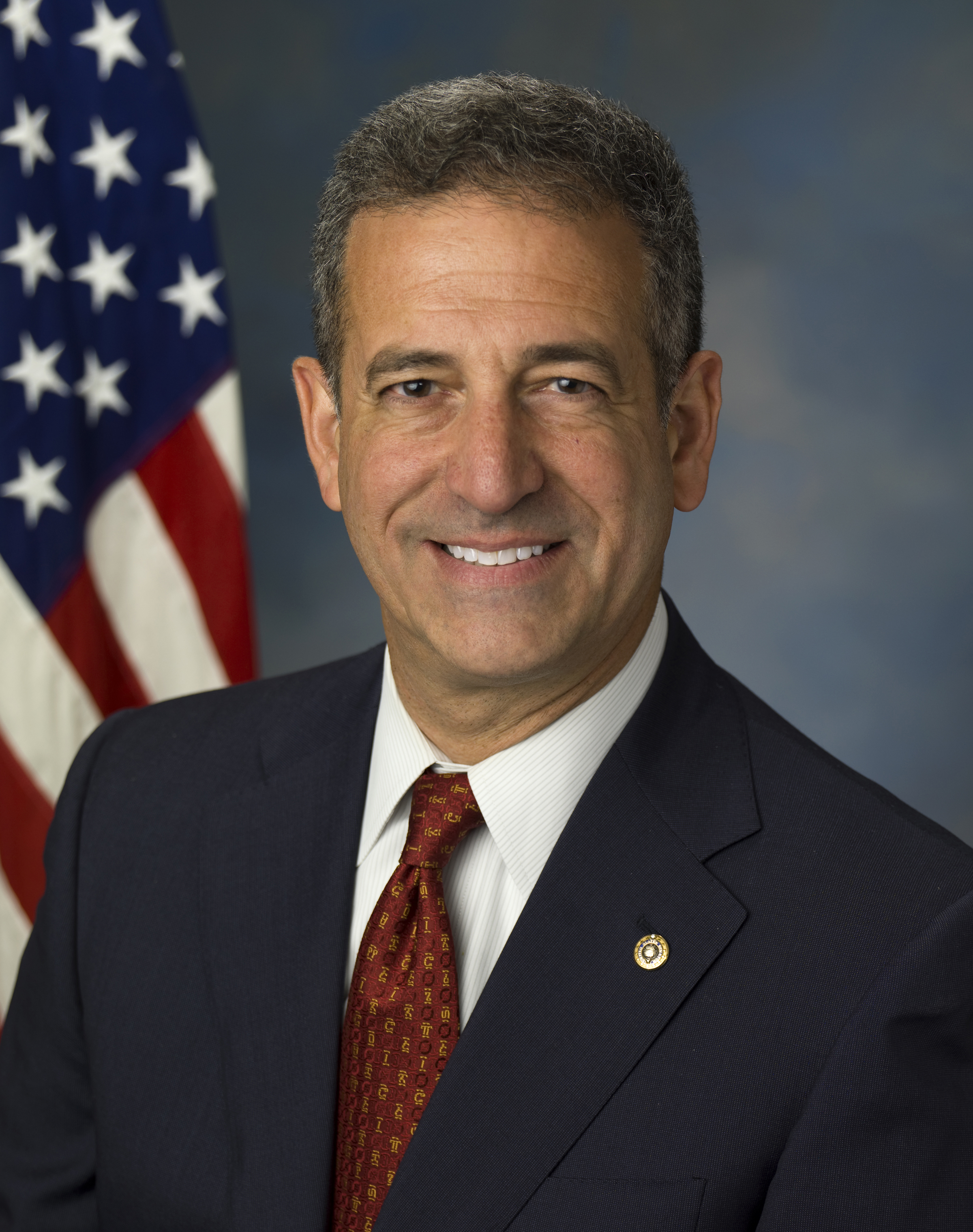
Nominee	Ron Johnson	Russ Feingold
Party	Republican	Democratic
Popular vote	1,125,932	1,020,841
Percentage	51.86%	47.02%
- Johnson: 40–50% 50–60% 60–70% 70–80% Feingold: 40–50% 50–60% 60–70% 70–80%
U.S. senator before election
Russ Feingold
Democratic
Elected U.S. Senator
Ron Johnson
Republican

Incumbent Democrat Russ Feingold ran for re-election to a fourth term, but was defeated by political newcomer, Republican Ron Johnson. Johnson, a millionaire manufacturer and Tea Party movement favorite who was running for his first political office, was the front runner. In response to controversy over his ownership of stock in BP, Johnson said he would sell it when market conditions were favorable and possibly use the proceeds to help finance his Senate campaign. Feingold's first television ad was a positive ad released in March. In July 2010, Feingold's second 2010 television election ad attacked Johnson for alleged support for offshore drilling in the Great Lakes. Johnson quickly countered Feingold with a television ad of his own. Feingold's logo was Moving Forward. In one ad he emphasized independence and called himself a "Penny Pincher." Johnson argued that his professions, manufacturer and accountant were underrepresented in the U.S. Senate, and there were too many lawyers (57 out of 100 members), including Feingold.

Wisconsin Republican primary election
Party	Candidate	Votes	%
Republican	Ron Johnson	500,821	84.7%
Republican	David Westlake	61,287	10.4%
Republican	Stephen M. Finn	29,002	4.9%
Total votes		591,107	100.0%

Wisconsin election
Party	Candidate	Votes	%	±%
Republican	Ron Johnson	1,125,999	51.86%	+7.75%
Democratic	Russ Feingold (Incumbent)	1,020,958	47.02%	−8.33%
Constitution	Rob Taylor	23,473	1.08%	N/A
	Write-In Votes	901	0.04%	N/A
Majority		105,041	4.84%	−6.4%
Turnout		2,170,430	100.00%	−26.4%
Republican gain from Democratic				

== See also ==
- 2010 United States elections
  - 2010 United States gubernatorial elections
  - 2010 United States House of Representatives elections
- 111th United States Congress
- 112th United States Congress
