= Asceticism in Judaism =

Ascetic lifestyles in a Jewish context

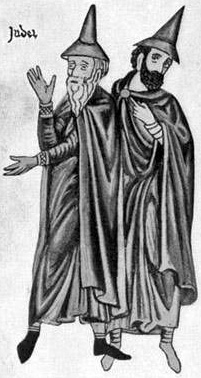
Ashkenazi Hasidim were a Jewish mystical and ascetic movement in medieval Germany.

Asceticism is a lifestyle characterized by abstinence from sensual pleasures, often for the purpose of pursuing spiritual goals. Asceticism has not been a dominant theme within Judaism, but minor-to-significant ascetic traditions have been a part of Jewish spirituality.

Many Jewish sources describe the physical world as essentially good; the human body as a servant of the spirit, and therefore not corrupt; the human being as possessing dignity as one made in the image of God; and physical pleasures as God-given and therefore to be enjoyed with gratitude toward the divine giver. One who refuses to partake of the material world was even described as a sinner by Samuel of Nehardea in tractate Taanit (Taanit 11a).

At the same time, other sources recommend and even require Jews to avoid intemperate and extravagant behavior, which is seen as leading to bad character traits and sometimes to outright sin. Thus Jews were recommended to moderate their eating and drinking and sexual behavior; to "sanctify" their material consumption by intending its ultimate purpose to be enabling service of God rather than selfish pleasure; and where appropriate to make extra "fences" around the law by avoiding specific activities that seem likely to lead to sin. Overall, Judaism recommends moderation rather than total abstinence, a balance perhaps best represented by Maimonides's "golden middle way" between sensual luxury and tortured self-deprivation.

In addition, many sources suggest that members of the spiritual elite would be best served by a greater level of asceticism than the masses, including practices such as fasting and sexual abstinence, in order to enable them to focus on Torah study or else mystical contemplation. While such behavior was generally the choice of pious individuals, in a few cases it became the focus of widespread communal movements, particularly the Ashkenazi Hasidim and Lurianic Kabbalah.

== Biblical and classical rabbinic views ==
=== Disapproving views ===
"The Lord did not create the world for desolation; he formed it for human habitation" (Isaiah 45:18) is the principle emphasized by the rabbis. In the ideal state of things nothing should be profane (Zechariah 14:20,21). This view is expressed in no uncertain terms by Rav: "Man in the life to come will have to account for every enjoyment offered him that was refused without sufficient cause."

Rabbi Yitzchak said, "Is the number of things forbidden by the Law not enough that you venture to add of your own accord by your inconsiderate vow?"

One teacher would say, "The Shekhinah rests on man only amid cheerfulness of performing a mitzvah." According to a Talmudical story, jesters who cheer up unhappy people are rewarded with a place in the World to Come.

In contrast to some religions which practice mortification of the flesh, Judaism prohibits mutilations for whatever purpose and of whatever character.

According to the Torah commandment of onah, a man must satisfy his wife's sexual desires through regular sexual intercourse. A man, too, is expected to marry, based on the Biblical verse "it is not good for a man to be alone" (Genesis 2:18). While according to some this is a practical measure (to discourage him from fantasizing about women other than his wife), the Talmud gives a more fundamental reason: "Any man who has no wife is without happiness, without blessing, and without good."

Zeira prohibited his students from engaging in voluntary pious behavior in the presence of others who would be viewed as less pious for not having followed the same stringency.

The Mishnah interprets the Biblical command to love God "with all your heart" to mean "with your two inclinations - good inclination and evil inclination". The latter half of this interpretation has been interpreted in various ways. According to some, it indicates that physical pleasures such as eating and drinking can be a form of service to God, if one's intention is to thereby strengthen the body in order to better serve God.

=== Approving views ===
Biblical laws prohibit performing certain functions, such as Temple service, while in a state of intoxication or ritual impurity. Thus priests were prohibited to drink wine prior to their service, sexual intercourse was forbidden to the Israelites in preparation for the Sinai Revelation, and Moses was understood by the rabbis to have separated from his wife during the period of his prophecy. (However, other prophets did not separate from their wives.)

In later generations these restrictions were voluntarily taken on by broader segments of the population for the purposes of self-consecration or communion with God. These groups included the followers of the Rechabites, known as "the water-drinkers" (who did not drink wine). Among the Pharisees, one who chose to apply the laws of food impurity to all foods, not only consecrated foods, received the title of chaber.

Among the broader population, a certain level of self-restraint was often recommended, to avoid the harms that can be caused by excess. "Haste, Nazarite, pass quickly around the vineyard, come not too near the grape" became a proverbial warning. "Make a fence around the Law" was a well-known principle. The Talmud declares "Abstain from everything unseemly and from whatsoever is like unto it." According to Abba Arikha, the purpose of the kashrut laws is to purify Israel—to train the Jew in self-discipline. The law: "Be holy!" was interpreted: Exercise abstinence in order to arrive at the state of purity and holiness.

In the Biblical narrative, humanity initially abstained from eating meat, (Genesis 1:29) and only after the flood, in an age of decline, eating of meat was permitted (Genesis 9:2 etc.) (similar traditions appear in Greek and Roman sources).

Shimon bar Yochai lived as an ascetic for a period, hiding in a cave from Roman persecution while subsisting on a minimal diet. He refused to appreciate the markets, bathhouses, and other worldly comforts built by the Romans, and held the view that "there should be no unrestrained laughter in this world". At the same time, he was one of those describing the nazirite as a sinner for abstaining from wine. His ascetic practices were not inspired by belief in the futility of this life and its sinfulness, but rather by the desire to avoid distractions from Torah study. He envied the generation of the desert, fed on heavenly manna rather than agricultural labor, who therefore had more time for Torah study.

The two great rabbinical schools of the first century, the Houses of Hillel and Shammai, debated the question whether life was worth living or not—"tov le-adam shenibra mishelo nibra", and in general the House of Shammai (who answered the question in the negative) leaned towards asceticism.

Upon the destruction of the Temple in Jerusalem in the year 70, a wave of asceticism swept over the people, and many people avoided meat and wine as sign of mourning, but this was not accepted as a permanent practice.

Judah ha-Nasi hosted elaborate feasts and had close social relations with prominent Romans, yet on his deathbed he proclaimed that he had "derived no benefit" from the world, implying that the luxuries in his house were necessary for his leadership role rather than intended for personal enjoyment.

=== Nazirites ===
According to Biblical law, a Nazirite was one who chose to abstain from drinking wine and cutting hair as an expression of holiness.

While the nazirite restrictions have the appearance of an ascetic practice, this understanding is not universal. According to one theory, wine and the crown of hair were sacred to the Canaanite deities, so the Nazirite laws simply indicate a rejection of Canaanite religion.

In later rabbinic sources, opinions vary regarding the desirability of nazirite abstention. The Talmud declares that becoming a nazirite is actually a kind of sin: "Why must the Nazirite bring a sin-offering at the end of his term? (Numbers 6:13–14) Because he sinned against his own person by his vow of abstaining from wine," says Eleazar ha-Kappar. In contrast, Nachmanides argued that being a nazirite is a desirable and holy state, and the "sin" for which the sin-offering is brought is actually leaving the nazirite status and returning to normal life.

Even according to those who frown upon nazirism in general, it was sometimes considered meritorious as a means of self-discipline. Simon the Just said: "I partook of a Nazirite meal only once, when I met with a handsome youth from the South who had taken the vow. When I asked him the reason, he said: 'I saw the evil inclination pursue me as I beheld my face reflected in the water, and I swore that these long curls shall be cut off and offered as a sacrifice to the Lord.' Whereupon I kissed him upon his forehead and blessed him, saying: 'May there be many Nazirites like thee in Israel!'"

=== Fasting ===
Just one fast day is commanded in the Bible - Yom Kippur. The Prophets had little patience with fasting. Isaiah 53 maintains that charity and deeper sense of justice, not fasting, are the expression of a will sanctified unto God. It is characteristic of the attitude of Judaism that this very chapter has been assigned for the Haftara for Yom Kippur, the one penitential fast-day of the synagogue.

Nevertheless, Biblical Jews resorted to fasting in times of great distress, or to commemorate historical tragedies. In the Talmudic era, communal fasts were regularly observed in times of collective hardship such as famine, drought and war. Four annual fast days were established in commemoration of the destruction of the Temple in Jerusalem; it was stated that one who would not share in the distress would have no part in the consolation of the people. The one additional communal fast day which survived to modern times (the Fast of Esther) may not be an expression of asceticism or mourning: it may follow the pattern of ancient fasts which are simply preparation for eating the sacrificial or festive meal on the following evening. Similarly, the rabbis decreed not to eat a meal late on Friday afternoon, in order to better enjoy the Shabbat evening meal, and perhaps this also underlies the report that some pious rabbis fasted every Friday (in preparation for the Sabbath).

In addition to these required fasts, in the post-Talmudic period a number of fasts became customary in certain pious circles, either as opportunities for penance (e.g. Yom Kippur Katan and Shovavim) or to commemorate negative historical events.

Attitudes varied towards individual fasting. Individual fasting as a form of repentance for personal sins is already attested to in the Bible. In the Talmud, some rabbis are mentioned as frequent fasters. Rabbi Zeira was perhaps the most prominent of these, but his general attitude was not ascetic. He fasted for set periods with particular goals in mind: that he might forget his Babylonian method of teaching before emigrating to Eretz Yisrael, and that hell-fire might later have no power over him. Mar, the son of Ravina II, fasted throughout the whole year with the exception of the holy days and the eve of Yom Kippur.

Other rabbis made a point of discouraging individual fasting. According to Samuel of Nehardea, an individual who chose to fast was called a sinner, based on the example of the Nazirite who was required to bring a sin-offering. Jose ben Halafta prohibited an individual from fasting.

== Medieval and early modern period ==
Many of the great Jewish thinkers and mystics of the Middle Ages were inclined to asceticism, engaging in fasting, sexual abstinence, and other restrictive practices. This is particularly true of those influenced by Neoplatonic mysticism, which viewed the flesh or matter as the source of evil. In contrast to the Talmud and other early sources which generally have a positive attitude towards the physical, the attitude in medieval sources is more often negative.

Dosa ben Saadia, the head of Sura Academy from 1012 to 1018, took an oath in his teenage years to refrain from eating bread as an act of asceticism, which he continued up until his death.

Bahya ibn Paquda's ethical system, Ḥovot haLevavot, oscillates between asceticism and Jewish optimism, with a decided leaning to the former. The tendency to mysticism induced moral philosophers of the Middle Ages like Bahya to favor abstinence as a mode of moral self-elevation.

According to Maimonides in Mishneh Torah, it is improper to avoid material comforts such as meat, wine, marriage, a beautiful house, or beautiful clothes. One should take a middle path: neither fully indulging one's lusts and vanities, nor rejecting material comforts and practicing fasting and asceticism. Rather, one should intend that their material consumption is intended for the purpose of serving God - for example, when eating one should intend "not only" to enjoy the food, but also to strengthen the body in order to serve God better. However, other passages suggest that a more ascetic lifestyle may be appropriate for the spiritual elite. A Torah scholar should make a point to live a modest and refined lifestyle, limiting his material consumption somewhat in ways that will cause others to respect him, and the Torah is sustained by those who figuratively "kill themselves" over it, "always distressing their body and not giving sleep to their eyes" due to the great labor of their study. Similarly, The Guide for the Perplexed (directed at the spiritual elite) presents an ideal in which a person would "reject, despise, and reduce his desires as much as is in his power[...] He should only give way to them when absolutely necessary". The somewhat contradictory views in Maimonides' writings seem to stem from a worldview that sees all human existence - both physical and spiritual - as good, but which also seems physicality as sometimes interfering with spiritual development. Apparently, in his view, either ascetic or non-ascetic lifestyles can be appropriate for individuals at different stages of spiritual development.

Abraham ben David of Posquières (12th century) was known for his ascetic lifestyle.

Abraham bar Hiyya (12th century) strongly refutes the Neoplatonic conception of evil as being identical with matter, and maintains against Bahya that indulgence in fasting and other modes of penitence is not meritorious, since only he who is ruled by his lower desires may resort to asceticism as the means of curbing his passion and disciplining his soul, whereas the really good should confine himself to such modes of abstinence as are prescribed by the Law. Nevertheless, Abraham bar Hiyya claims a higher rank for the saint who, secluded from the world, leads a life altogether consecrated to the service of God. He goes even so far as to advocate the state of celibacy in such cases, referring to the examples of Moses (who was celibate during the period of his prophecy), the majority of the prophets (who were, he thinks, unmarried), and to Simeon ben Azzai:

They said to ben Azzai: There is a type of scholar who expounds well and fulfills his own teachings well, and another who fulfills well and does not expound well. But you, who have never married, expound well on the importance of procreation, and yet you do not fulfill well your own teachings. Ben Azzai said to them: What shall I do, as my soul yearns for Torah, and I do not wish to deal with anything else. It is possible for the world to be maintained by others, who are engaged in the mitzva to be fruitful and multiply.

— Yevamot 63b:18

Like Bahya, Abraham bar Hiyya argued the ascetic, while leading a purer and holier life, requires less legal restraint.

Asher ben Meshullam was reported to be an ascetic (Hebrew: פָּרוּשׁ, romanized: pārush) who did not attend to any worldly business, but studied day and night, kept fasts, and never ate meat. His brother Jacob bore the title of Nazirite, being an ascetic abstaining from wine.

The whole family of Judah ben Samuel of Regensburg, his father, Samuel of Speyer, and his grandfather, Kalonymus ben Isaac the Elder, seem to have been a family of ascetics. Among the Ashkenazi Hasidic movement which they led, it was frequent to practice extreme self-punishment, such as immersing the legs in ice water for hours, as a form of penitence for sins. Such a system of punishments had little precedent in previous Jewish thought.

The subsequent development and spread of the Kabbalah produced other forms of asceticism. Lurianic kabbalah, as developed in the 16th and 17th centuries, introduced the idea that voluntary acts of piety could lead to a repair (tikkun) of the spiritually broken universe and bring about the Messianic era. Such Lurianic customs spread widely and included extensive fasting, frequent mikveh immersion, and even self-lashing. Some of these customs eventually become widely accepted practice, including fast days such as Fast of the Firstborn and Yom Kippur Katan.

These practices in turn led to a counter-reaction. In the 18th-19th centuries, the new Hasidic movement abandoned many of the ascetic practices which had become common among eastern European Jews. Among non-hasidim, the Mesillat Yesharim condemned ascetic practices which led to weakening of the body, while still recommending that pious individuals moderate their material consumption in order to avoid developing bad character traits. Nevertheless, some Hasidic groups developed even more stringent practices, particularly regarding sexuality, which have persisted until modern times.

== Non-rabbinic Jews ==
Strongly ascetic practices were common among some non-rabbinic Jews in the late Second Temple era, such as Banus and the Essenes. Many of these devotees of holiness, making asceticism their special object of life, were naturally led to view sensual life as contaminating. "Philo's ideal was to die daily, to mortify the flesh with fasting; he only insisted that the seclusion from social life should take place at the age of fifty, the time when the Levites retired from the active duties of the Temple service".

The 8th century Isawite and Yudghanite sects (forerunners of the Karaites), and many prominent Karaites themselves led ascetic lives; abstaining from meat and wine, and spending much of their time in meditation and devotion, partly in order to obtain a deeper knowledge of the Scriptures, partly as mourners over Jerusalem.

Jewish hermits, living in a state of celibacy and devoting themselves to meditation, were found among Ethiopian Jews (Beta Israel) as late as 1900. They claimed that Aaron the high priest was the first Nazarite who from the time of his consecration separated from his wife to live only in the shadow of the tabernacle. Accordingly, they joined the monastic order after they have been married and have become fathers of children. According to Flad, the order founded by Abba Sabra (Halévy, Abba Sura) consists altogether of eunuchs. This would indicate non-Jewish influence.

== Notes and references ==
Its bibliography:

- Lazarus, Ethics of Judaism, §§ 246–256.
- L. Dukes, Zur Kenntniss der Neuhebräischen Poesie, 1842, pp. 8 et seq.;
- Goldziher, Del' Ascétisme, in Revue del' Histoire des Religions, 1898, pp. 314 et seq.;
- Nöldeke, Sufi, in Z. D. M. G. xlviii. 45–47
