= Fred Davis III =

American political strategist

Fred Newton Davis III (born c. 1952) is an American Republican Party strategy and media consultant who is best known for creating political campaign ads for candidates.

== Early life ==
A native of Tulsa, Oklahoma, Davis is the oldest of four children. Davis was 19 when his father died; he inherited his father's public relations firm and dropped out of college.

== Career ==
=== Early career ===
In the late-1970s and early-1980s, Davis was majority partner in Tulsa, Oklahoma, advertising agency Davis & Nauser (with partner Jeffery Nauser), where his client list included just one political candidate, his uncle, then Tulsa mayoral candidate and current U.S. Senator Jim Inhofe.

Davis left for California when Oklahoma's economy suffered from the collapse of the local oil industry. He founded and leads Strategic Perception, an advertising firm based in Hollywood.

=== Political ads ===
He created the Celebrity ad for presidential candidate John McCain and the Demon Sheep video for California Senate candidate Carly Fiorina. Davis was described as "the most creative person in the business" by Republican media consultant Mark McKinnon. His political clients have included President George W. Bush, presidential candidates Dan Quayle, John McCain, Jon Huntsman and John Kasich. Senators Jim Inhofe, John Cornyn, Lamar Alexander, John McCain, Jeff Flake, Bob Corker, Chuck Grassley, David Perdue, John Kennedy, Ben Sasse, Elizabeth Dole and Paul Coverdell. Also governors Sonny Perdue, Rick Snyder, Arnold Schwarzenegger, and Ernie Fletcher.

His long-shot gubernatorial campaign for Sonny Perdue in Georgia featured a video of a giant rat rampaging Georgia. The rat portrayed the current, popular governor Roy Barnes. The video is credited as starting the movement toward viral videos in politics. Perdue beat Barnes handily, in spite of being outspent more than seven to one.

A similar campaign for then-Governor Rick Snyder of Michigan featured the unusual Davis slogan, "One Tough Nerd". The slogan caught on across the state helping propel the unknown Snyder past several statewide office holders into a primary win without a runoff, then the general election.

He created "I'm You", a well-known 2010 ad for U.S. Senate candidate Christine O'Donnell. The ad featured her declaring she was "not a witch" in response to the re-airing of past statements made by her about her interactions with non-Christian religious practices. O'Donnell's witch statements had become a staple of late night comedy programs, including Saturday Night Live, before Davis was hired.

In February 2012, Davis authored a controversial ad for Representative Pete Hoekstra for his Senate campaign against incumbent Democrat Debbie Stabenow. The ad attacked Stabenow as Debbie "Spend-it-now" and showed an Asian woman riding a bicycle in a rice paddy thanking Stabenow (in broken English) for enriching the Chinese economy at the expense of the U.S.

Republican strategist Mike Murphy tweeted that the ad was "really, really dumb", while Stabenow called it "shocking" and "nasty". Hoekstra denied that the ad was insensitive to Chinese Americans and was meant to focus on Stabenow's voting record. Within two weeks, the Hoekstra campaign removed the video from his campaign website and YouTube account.

=== Obama document ===
In 2012, Davis' firm prepared a 57-page plan (commissioned by billionaire Joe Ricketts) for a $10 million campaign attempting to stop the re-election of President Obama. It partially recycled points of criticism against Obama from the 2008 presidential campaign, including his relationship with Obama's reverend, Jeremiah Wright. The proposal, titled, The Defeat of Barack Hussein Obama: The Ricketts Plan to End His Spending for Good, was initially approved by the Ricketts' Ending Spending Action Fund.

A copy of the proposal document was released by a person unconnected to the ad campaign to The New York Times, after which it was roundly lambasted in external commentary. Ricketts then disavowed commissioning the plan. Although Davis' agency had gone at least as far as contacting Larry Elder to join the project, no ads were ever aired. Ricketts issued a statement disavowing the ad campaign hours after it was publicized by The New York Times.
