= Demon Sheep =

2010 U.S. political advertisement

The Demon Sheep or Demon Sheep ad is a political ad created as part of Carly Fiorina's 2010 campaign for the United States Senate. The ad gained international attention for its characterization of Fiorina's opponent as a wolf in sheep's clothing, portrayed by a man wearing a sheep costume with glowing red eyes. Although opinion remains divided as to the effectiveness of the ad in supporting Fiorina's campaign, it is widely regarded as one of the most bizarre and memorable political advertisements ever devised.

== Background ==
In 2010, Carly Fiorina, a businesswoman then best known as the former chief executive officer of Hewlett-Packard from 1999 to 2005, entered the race for the Republican nomination for the U.S. Senate seat then held by Democratic Senator Barbara Boxer. Among her opponents was Tom Campbell, a former congressman who had served five terms in the U.S. House of Representatives between 1989 and 2001, representing California's 12th and 15th congressional districts. Early polling suggested that Campbell held a substantial lead over Fiorina. For a promotional ad opposing Campbell, the Fiorina campaign turned to Fred Davis, an advertising executive who had gained notoriety for his 2008 ad depicting then presidential candidate Barack Obama as a celebrity akin to Britney Spears and Paris Hilton. The ad, released on Fiorina's campaign website in February 2010, quickly gained international attention.

== The Demon Sheep ==
The ad, which runs about three minutes and twenty seconds, opens with an idyllic scene of sheep running and grazing in a sunny meadow, as a female narrator extols the supposed virtues of fiscally conservative politicians: "purity, piety: our fiscal conservative leaders. Men we admire; aspire to be: wholesome, honorable, true believers. Men like Tom Campbell, who would never lead us astray; his pedestal, so high..." From behind the hillside, a cut-out animation in the style of Terry Gilliam depicts a sheep rising into the sky on top of a Doric column. Suddenly, the sky darkens, storm clouds roll in, and lightning strikes the pillar, which vanishes. The sheep then tumbles end-over-end in slow motion, as ominous music begins to play, and the original narrator gives way to a stern male voice (veteran actor Robert Davi), questioning Campbell's record and credentials as a fiscal conservative.

The next part of the ad blames Campbell, who was California's Director of Finance from 2004 to 2005, for California's budget woes, as images of Campbell are alternated with footage of sheets of money being printed, played at increasing speed, and images of pigs, sheep, out-of-business signs, and a close-up of the word "deficit" in a dictionary. The narrator asks, "who would remember the Tom Campbell Budget?" as pictures of people from various walks of life appear, each of them wearing a concerned expression; the narrator answers his own question: "we would." As hundred-dollar bills float by in the background, the narrator castigates Campbell for having supported various taxes, especially an increase in the gasoline tax, proposed following the 2008 financial crisis. Images of Campbell now alternate with footage of a sheep chewing its cud at increasingly rapid speeds. In a sarcastic tone of voice, the narrator repeatedly asks "Tom" whether his actions or stances on various issues were "fiscally conservative". Campbell's support for other taxes, and having been "critical of the Bush tax cuts" are also mentioned, as an image of Carly Fiorina's signature on the Taxpayer Protection Pledge appears. The ad calls Campbell the "only Republican candidate" not to sign the pledge.

At this point, the ad returns to footage of sheep in a meadow, and Campbell is described as an "FCINO: Fiscal Conservative In Name Only", while a man wearing a sheep costume with glowing red eyes peers out from behind a tree. The "Demon Sheep" then crawls on his hands and knees amongst the flock, pretending to eat grass, and repeatedly making sinister glances at the camera. The narrator explicitly calls Campbell a wolf in sheep's clothing, who has set California on the path to "bankruptcy and higher taxes," as the words "has he fooled you?" appear in the foreground. The narrator asks, "might there be a better choice?" The ad abruptly changes tone, shifting to an office setting, with an unnamed woman in a business suit meeting with clients. The woman is seen only indirectly, but implied to be Carly Fiorina, and the narrator describes her in an approving voice, as a hard-working and proven fiscal conservative. The ad closes with dramatic music and the address of Fiorina's campaign website.

== Reception ==
Although the full ad was never broadcast on television, it rapidly garnered national and international attention, and was featured on broadcast news as an example of an ad that was either absurdly juvenile or a brilliant lampoon, depending on one's point of view. Slate's Christopher Bream described it as "confusing and sloppy." Jason Linkins of The Huffington Post called it "Bonkers." National Public Radio's Jessica Taylor describes it as "one of the most infamous political ads of all time." Michael Scherer of Time suggested viewing the ad "by pressing play on your cassette tape of Pink Floyd's Dark Side of The Moon just as you click play on YouTube." However, New York Times columnist Gail Collins refers to it as "one of the all-time great attack videos," and The Week asks whether the "Demon Sheep" was "the best bad campaign ad ever."

== Aftermath ==
The ad initially appeared to backfire, as Campbell's poll numbers showed his lead over Fiorina increasing after the ad was released. But either because, or perhaps in spite of the "Demon Sheep" ad, Fiorina soon pulled ahead and defeated Campbell in the Republican primary by a wide margin. For her campaign against Barbara Boxer, Davis created another memorable ad, depicting Boxer "as a bloated, power-hungry blimp floating over the Capitol and California." However, in the general election, Fiorina lost to the Democratic incumbent by ten percentage points. Fiorina would later seek the Republican nomination for President in the 2016 election.

Also in the 2010 election cycle, Davis created a spot for Christine O'Donnell, the Republican nominee for the special Senate election in Delaware, featuring her denying that she was a witch. She lost by a wide margin in the general election.
