= Bannus (disambiguation) =

Bannus may refer to:

- Ban (medieval), the royal prerogative to rule and command
- The Bannus, a fictional reality-altering machine in the novel Hexwood by Diana Wynne Jones
- Bannus Lough, a lake in County Donegal, Ireland
- Bannus, a first-century hermit mentioned by Josephus
