= Golden mean =

Golden mean may refer to:

- Golden mean (philosophy), the felicitous middle between the extremes of excess and deficiency
- Golden mean (Judaism), a philosophy pertaining to body and soul in Jewish belief
- Golden ratio, a specific mathematical ratio (sometimes called golden mean)
- Golden ratio (mathematics and visual art)
- The Golden Mean (1993), third novel in The Griffin and Sabine Trilogy by Nick Bantock
- The golden-mean fallacy, another name for the argument to moderation
- Doctrine of the Golden Mean, a chapter in Li Ji, one of the Four Books of Confucianism

== See also ==
- Ethic of reciprocity, also known as the Golden Rule
