= Banus (disambiguation) =

Banus may refer to:

- Banus, first-century desert-dwelling Jewish ascetic, teacher of Titus Flavius Josephus
- Camila Banus (born 1990), American actress
- Gran Hotel Guadalpin Banús, luxury five hotel in Puerto Banús, Marbella, Spain
- Maria Banuș (1914–1999), Romanian poet, essayist, prose writer and translator
- Puerto Banús, marina in the area of Nueva Andalucía, to the southwest of Marbella, Spain on the Costa del Sol

== See also ==
- Babanusa
- Banu (disambiguation)
