= The Savior's Alliance for Lifting the Truth =

- Founded: 1996
- Founder: Christine O'Donnell
- Purpose: Promoting chastity among Gen X'ers
- Location: California
- Method: Public advocacy and congressional lobbying
- Key people: Christine O'Donnell, President (through July 2010)

The Savior's Alliance for Lifting the Truth, commonly known as The SALT, is an evangelical Christian organization founded in 1996 by Christine O'Donnell, a Christian public relations and marketing consultant who ran for the United States Senate, hoping to represent the State of Delaware, in 2006, 2008, and 2010. O'Donnell served as president of The SALT from its founding and was still listed as its president as of July 2010. The organization sought to promote chastity in young people before marriage, preferring to avoid the use of the term sexual abstinence. The SALT was featured in the U.S. national media on many occasions during the 1990s, with O'Donnell appearing as its representative.

O'Donnell founded the organization in 1996 in order to sponsor a rally of young people at the Republican National Convention to support the party's anti-abortion stance. By 1997 SALT had 4 chapters, two in New Jersey, one in Philadelphia and one in Washington, D.C.

In September 2010, the Saviors Alliance faced a possible loss of its non-profit, tax exempt status for failing to file tax forms for the past three years (2007–2009) with the Internal Revenue Service. An attorney for O'Donnell's 2010 political campaign responded that such a failure to file was a common oversight among small non-profits.

== See also ==
- Silver Ring Thing
- True Love Waits (organization)
