= Generations of Virtue =

Organization focused on sexual purity

- Founded: 2003
- Founder: Julie Hiramine
- Type: 501(c)(3)
- Tax ID no.: 14-1875193
- Legal status: Non-profit organization
- Purpose: Activism
- Headquarters: Colorado Springs, Colorado
- Region served: Singapore, Indonesia, Philippines, China, Thailand, Malaysia, Hong Kong, Cambodia, Taiwan, UAE, South Korea, Myanmar, South Africa, Australia, United States
- Staff: 4
- Website: generationsofvirtue.org

Generations of Virtue (GOV) is a non-profit organization whose focus is to equip families with resources and education on implementing lifestyles of sexual purity, based on Christian values. GOV was founded in 2003 by Julie Hiramine, the author of Guardians of Purity, and is headquartered in Colorado Springs, Colorado. The organization has developed curriculum, lecture series, book series, and several products to promote purity.

== History ==
In 2001, Julie C Hiramine founded Generations of Virtue in Colorado Springs, Colorado. The organization has successfully reached thousands with the goal of teaching sexual integrity to families and has educated on a myriad of other topics related to sexual purity, the prevention of human trafficking, the interpretation of media, cultural parenting, safe technology use, practically equipping youth for success, strategic family development, and raising generations of virtue who refuse to support exploitative industries.

Through the years, the organization has worked with several global organizations including the following: Charisma House Media, the Tween Gospel Alliance, Every Nation churches, World Changers' Summit, Hearts at Home, MOPS, and the International Children's Ministry Networks. In 2006, Generations of Virtue was invited to the New York State Homeschool Convention. From there, they began working with moms' groups, the homeschool circuit, and churches in the U.S. Over the years, Generations of Virtue has tried to broaden its reach to public, private, and international schools and dozens of church networks throughout the world. Generations of Virtue has ministered in numerous denominations and church movements, including the Methodist, Anglican, Baptist, Assemblies of God, Evangelical Free Church, Nondenominational, Lutheran, Presbyterian, Mennonite, Pentecostal, Calvary Chapel, Full Gospel Assembly, and Vineyard. Hiramine has written for Charisma magazine and Charisma Publishing published her debut book in 2010. Hiramine is also a Director for the organization True Value of a Woman, and frequently speaks at parenting and family conferences around the world.

== Operations ==
Generations of Virtue instructs leaders, educators and parents to be effective within their individual areas of influence. They accomplish this goal through strategic partnerships with key organizations both in the United States and internationally.

GOV has released several book series, including Teknon and the Champion Warriors and Beautifully Made. In 2005, GOV introduced purity rings to their product line. GOV started an internship program for youth ages 16-21. During the same year, they launched their international speaking tours.
