= Making Sense of Abstinence =

Making Sense of Abstinence is a collection of 16 lessons for teaching about sexual abstinence in the context of comprehensive sexuality education. According to the Minnesota Organization on Adolescent Pregnancy, Prevention, and Parenting, it is "a curriculum that takes abstinence beyond a one-dimensional scope of 'just say no,'...[utilizing] positive and engaging activities to help young people think about abstinence in a way that values their ability to make decisions."

Sample lessons include such titles as "So What's An Abstinence Anyway?" "Hey, Mom? Hey, Dad? Hey...Gram? Can We Talk about Abstinence?" "Just Say Know," "Masturbation: A Touchy Subject," "Handling Horny," and "Some Day: Making the Transition from Sexual Abstinence".

The manual has received praise from sexuality educators for expanding the way sexuality education teaches about abstinence, and for teaching the subject in a positive way, unlike other fear-based approaches. For example, the online journal "Sexual Intelligence" praised "Making Sense of Abstinence" for "not treating kids like robotic idiots."

Abstinence-only advocates have criticized the manual for including such topics as outercourse and masturbation, behaviors they believe should not be acknowledged. Critics also claim that teenagers should not learn information to protect themselves when their abstinence decisions change.

The authors of "Making Sense of Abstinence" state that neither the "Just say no" approach, nor the "Always say yes," is appropriate for abstinence education. Rather, they emphasize that teens need complete information to help them make the best decisions for themselves.
