= Sexual abstinence =

Act of refraining from sexual activity

Sexual abstinence or sexual restraint is the practice of refraining from sexual activity for medical, psychological, legal, social, philosophical, moral, religious or other reasons. It is a part of chastity. Celibacy is sexual abstinence generally motivated by factors such as an individual's personal or religious beliefs. Sexual abstinence before marriage is required by social norms in some societies, or by law in some countries.

While actual abstinence prevents pregnancy and sexually transmitted infections, mere attempts at abstinence have little effect on the risk of either. Access to other forms of birth control, such as emergency birth control, is thus recommended.

== History ==
The ancient world discouraged promiscuity for both health and social reasons. According to Pythagoras (6th century BCE), sex should be practiced in the winter, but not the summer, but was harmful to male health in every season because the loss of semen was dangerous, hard to control, and both physically and spiritually exhausting, but had no effect on females. This idea may have been merged with Zoroastrian ideas of good and evil in a philosophy known as Gnosticism, which influenced Christian and Islamic attitudes to sexual activity. But others stated that the Christian religion's hold on to the ideal of sexual abstinence prior to the appearing of gnosticism and Zoroastrianism and its roots are to be found in the Old Testament (which is the base of the New Testament) in which virginity was required by law and marriage was especially protected (see Deuteronomy chapter 22).

Throughout history, and especially prior to the 20th century, there have been those who have held that sexual abstinence confers numerous health benefits. For males, lack of abstinence was thought to cause a reduction of vitality. In modern times, the argument has been phrased in biological terms, claiming that loss of semen through ejaculation results in a depletion of vital nutrients such as lecithin and phosphorus, which are also found at high levels in the brain. Conservation of the semen allegedly allows it to be reabsorbed back into the bloodstream and aid in the healthy development of the body. The German philosopher Friedrich Nietzsche spoke of the positive physiological effects of abstinence: "The reabsorption of semen by the blood ... perhaps prompts the stimulus of power, the unrest of all forces towards the overcoming of resistances ... The feeling of power has so far mounted highest in abstinent priests and hermits". Before the "sexual revolution" of the 1960s, it was commonly believed by members of the medical profession that numerous mental and physical diseases in men were caused primarily by loss of nutrients through seminal discharge, and that the deliberate conservation of this substance would lead to increased health, vitality, and intellectual prowess. This also applied to masturbation, which was also thought to lead to bedwetting and hairy palms.

Some advantages in favor of sexual abstinence were also claimed by Walter Siegmeister, better known as Dr. Raymond W. Bernard, an early 20th-century American alternative health, esoteric writer, author and mystic, who formed part of the alternative reality subculture. In his essay entitled "Science discovers the physiological value of continence" (1957) he states:

[I]t is clear that there is an important internal physiological relation between the secretions of the sex glands and the central nervous system, that the loss of these secretions, voluntarily or involuntarily, exercises a detrimental effect on the nutrition and vitality of the nerves and brain, while, on the other hand, the conservation of these secretions has a vitalizing effect on the nervous system, a regenerating effect on the endocrine glands [,] and a rejuvenating effect on the organism as a whole.

Historically, there has been a swing from the sexually liberal end of the Industrial Revolution to the chaste values of the early Victorian period. This was then followed by a new puritanism from the late Victorian era to the mid-1900s. This important transformation often colors discussion of sexual behavior in the later 20th century. World War I began a return to sexual freedom and indulgence, but more often than not, the appearance of conforming to the earlier moral values of abstinence before marriage was retained. With the conclusion of World War II, the societal importance of abstinence declined. The advent of the first oral contraceptive pill and widely available antibiotics suppressed many consequences of wide and free sexual behavior, while social morals were also changing. By the 1970s, abandonment of premarital chastity was no longer taboo in the majority of western societies, and the reverse became true. Some cultural groups continued to place a value on the moral purity of an abstainer, but abstinence was caught up in a wider reevaluation of moral values.

During the early 20th century, prominent feminist and birth control advocate Margaret Sanger argued that abstinence from sexual activity led to greater endurance and strength, and was a sign of the best of the species:

Though sex cells are placed in a part of the anatomy for the essential purpose of easily expelling them into the female for the purpose of reproduction, there are other elements in the sexual fluid which are the essence of blood, nerve, brain, and muscle. When redirected into the building and strengthening of these, we find men or women of the greatest endurance and greatest magnetic power. A girl can waste her creative powers by brooding over a love affair to the extent of exhausting her system, with the results not unlike the effects of masturbation and debauchery.

J. D. Unwin was a British ethnologist and social anthropologist at Oxford and Cambridge universities. Unwin wrote several books including Sex and Culture (1934). In Sex and Culture Unwin studied 80 tribes and six known civilizations through 5,000 years of history and found a positive correlation between the cultural achievement of a people and the amount of sexual restraint which they observed. The author finds that the most culturally successful groups always exhibit lifelong monogamous relationships which include sexual abstinence outside of marriage. According to Unwin, after a nation becomes prosperous it becomes increasingly liberal with regard to sexual morality and as a result loses its cohesion, its impetus and its purpose, ultimately having a negative effect on society: "The whole of human history does not contain a single instance of a group becoming civilized unless it has been absolutely monogamous, nor is there any example of a group retaining its culture after it has adopted less rigorous customs."

== Prevalence ==
Sexual abstinence can be categorized in primary sexual abstinence with no sexual experience at all and secondary sexual abstinence with no sexual activity in last months to years. The percentage of population which is sexually abstinent varies by age, gender, culture and socioeconomic status. A 2020 review found among 25- to 45-year-old men between 5% to 33% with primary sexual abstinence and between 1% and 47% with secondary sexual abstinence.

A lack of sexual activity despite a desire for it can occur among single persons who have difficulty finding willing sexual partners, as well as among people in sexless intimate relationships. Sexual abstinence can also be attributed to external factors such as imprisonment.

== During fertile period ==
Schematic indicating the fertile period of a woman

Sexual abstinence can be practiced during the period in which the woman is fertile.

== Before marriage ==
=== Premarital chastity ===
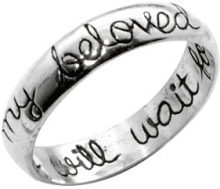
Purity rings are worn by some youth committed to the practice of sexual abstinence.

In most cultural, ethical, and religious contexts, sex within marriage is not considered to be contrary to notions of chastity. Some religious systems prohibit sexual activities between a person and anyone other than a spouse of that person, as have past legal systems and societal norms. In such contexts, sexual abstinence was prescribed for unmarried individuals for the purpose of chastity. Chastity has been used as a synonym for sexual abstinence, they are similar but with different connotations.

=== Legal issues ===
In some countries any sexual activity outside marriage is illegal. Such laws are mostly tied to religion and the legal and political traditions within the particular jurisdiction. Laws differ greatly from country to country. In some countries, such as Saudi Arabia, Pakistan, Afghanistan, Iran, Kuwait, Maldives, Morocco, Mauritania, Qatar, Sudan, Yemen, any form of sexual activity outside marriage is illegal.

=== Violence ===
In some parts of the world, people suspected of engaging in premarital or same-sex sexual activity can become victims of honor killings committed by their families. Stoning for sexual activity outside marriage is also a punishment in some places.

== Long-term abstinence as a lifestyle ==
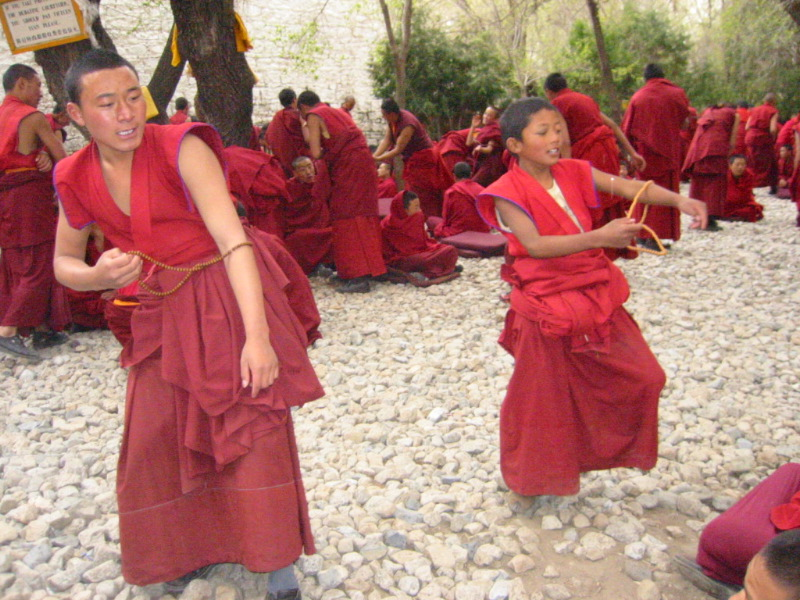
Young Buddhist monks in Tibet. Celibacy is required for some religious orders like Jainism.

Lifelong (or at least long-term) abstinence, often associated with philosophical or religious asceticism, is distinguished from chastity before marriage. Abstinence is often viewed as an act of self-control over the natural desire to have sex. The display of the strength of character allows the abstainer to set an example for those not able to contain their "base urges". At other times, abstinence has been seen as a great social skill practiced by those who refuse to engage with the material and physical world. Some groups and teachers that propose sexual abstinence consider it an essential means to reach a particular intellectual or spiritual condition, or that chastity allows one to achieve a required self-control or self-consciousness.

== Abstinence in religions ==
Some religions regard chastity as a virtue expected of faithful adherents. This usually includes abstinence from sex for the unmarried, and fidelity to a marriage partner.

In some religions, some groups of people are expected to remain unmarried and to abstain from sex completely. These groups include monks, nuns, and priests in various sects of Islam, Judaism, Christianity, Hinduism, and Buddhism. Chastity is required of the respective sacerdotal orders. The Shakers, on the other hand, impose chastity in the form of celibacy for all members, even forgoing procreation such as the case with the castration cult.

=== Christianity ===
"But because of sexual sins, each man is to have his own wife, and each woman is to have her own husband."

— 1 Corinthians 7:2, EHV

"Let marriage be held in honor by all, and let the marriage bed be kept undefiled; for God will judge fornicators and adulterers."

— Hebrews 13:4, NRSV

Most Christians teach that sexual intercourse should occur exclusively within marriage, and that sexual abstinence is the norm outside of that. Sex between people not married to each other is either fornication or adultery. But for married couples, Paul of Tarsus wrote that they should not deprive each other, except for a short time for devotion to prayer.

The Eastern Orthodox Churches and the Oriental Orthodox Churches teach chastity until marriage. But even then, in accordance with the teaching of the Apostle Paul, periods of abstinence are encouraged among married couples. Traditionally, Orthodox spouses abstain from physical relations on Wednesdays (the day Jesus was betrayed), Fridays (the day Jesus was crucified), the eves of Great Feasts and throughout the four fasting periods (Great Lent, Nativity Fast, Apostles' Fast and Dormition Fast). This is to allow believers "to give themselves time for fasting and prayer (1 Corinthians 7:5)."

Catholicism defines chastity as the virtue that moderates the sexual appetite. Unmarried Catholics express chastity through sexual abstinence. Sexual intercourse within marriage is considered chaste when it retains the twofold significance of union and procreation. This is why the Catholic Church does not condone the use of contraception, even within the confines of the marital union. Pope John Paul II spoke on contraception not only as its nature as sinful in the eyes of the church, but also in regards to its dangerous nature to harm married couples. Without the openness to life, John Paul said, the gift of oneself within the bond of marriage is incomplete. The Catholic Church does, however, condone the practice of periodical abstinence during a woman's natural cycle of fertility for married couples who, for just reasons, do not wish to have a child at that time. This is a key component of Natural Family Planning, which is set apart from contraceptive measures on the grounds that it does not interrupt the natural order of the marital union with artificial means. The entirety of the Catholic Church's stance on contraception is predicated by the way the Catholic Church views marriage, insofar as marriage is an intimate human union between man and a woman wherein the two mutually give of themselves in their entirety for the good of the other and live in such a way that is open to procreation.

The Methodist Church teaches that "Although all persons are sexual beings whether or not they are married, sexual relations are only clearly affirmed in the marriage bond."

The United Church of Christ is "liberal in their approaches, believing that individuals must decide for themselves how to express their sexual nature."

=== Hinduism ===
The Indian tradition of Brahmacharya places great emphasis on abstinence as a way of harnessing the energy of body and mind towards the goal of spiritual realization. In males, the semen (Vīrya) is considered sacred, and its preservation (except when used for procreation) and conversion into higher life-energy (Ojas) is considered essential for the development of enhanced intellectual and spiritual capacities.

The blending of sexual and spiritual is portrayed in Hindu iconography, as seen in ubiquitous phallic and vaginal iconography in Hindu temples and for instance in the Kharjuraho and Konarak medieval temples, where thousands of couples having sex in endless positions, and with the gods, are carved in deep bas-relief. However, these depictions of sex are not generally understood to be a license for free sexual practices, but are instead meant to celebrate procreation as an integral part of existence in the universe. In actual practice, it is highly encouraged that both males and females abstain from pre-marital sex and exercise chastity, which still exists today in Hindu cultures.

=== Islam ===
Islam forbids intercourse outside of marriage (zina). Marriage for all who are able to is strongly encouraged, as it is said to help guard one's modesty. For those who cannot marry, fasting (sawm) is recommended, as it is said to diminish sexual power. Abstinence is practiced during the time of a woman's menstruation or istihadha. Abstinence from sexual intercourse is also practiced from dawn to dusk during days where fasting is observed, and sexual intercourse during fasting is prohibited. Sexual intercourse during Hajj is also strictly forbidden, as it can invalidate Ihram.

=== Jainism ===
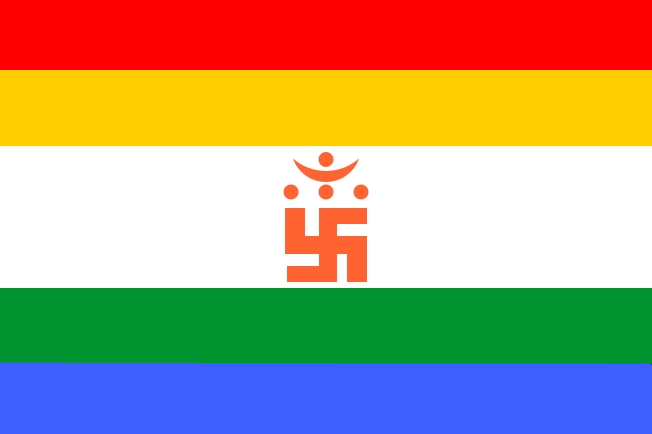
Green colour in the Jain flag stands for brahmacharya

Brahmacharya is one of the five major vows prescribed for the śrāvakā (layman) and ascetics in Jainism. For those Jains who adopt the path of monks, celibacy in action, words and thoughts is expected. For lay Jains who are married, the virtue of brahmacharya requires remaining sexually faithful to one's chosen partner (fidelity). For lay Jains who are unmarried, chaste living requires Jains to avoid sex before marriage.

In the Jain monastic tradition, brahmacharya implies, among other things, the mandatory renunciation of sex and marriage. For a lay Jain, it represents a virtuous lifestyle devoid of constant sexual urges, that also includes simple living, meditation and other behaviors.

=== Judaism ===
Judaism forbids intercourse outside marriage (which is termed znut or promiscuity), but has no ideal of chastity. Within marriage abstinence is also required during and following a woman's menstruation. The husband is not allowed to deprive sex from his wife, even if she is not fertile (known as mitzvat onah).

== Associated practices ==
Among some groups of people, the wearing of a purity ring is a reminder to oneself and others, that they are practicing sexual abstinence. In order to aid their sobriety, some sexual abstinents partake in the usage of anaphrodisiacs.

Historically, some individuals were said to wear a chastity belt, a locking item of clothing designed to prevent sexual intercourse. They were used to protect the wearer from rape or temptation. Some devices have been designed with additional features to prevent masturbation. Chastity belts have been created for males and females, ostensibly for the purpose of chastity.

== Masturbation ==
In the 2010s and 2020s, promotion of abstinence from masturbation for health reasons generated millions of views on social media. The medical claims made were generally unsupported by any scientific evidence, and urologist Ashley Winter pointed out that voluntary ejaculation is in many men simply replaced by involuntary nocturnal emissions. Unsubstantiated claims included that abstaining from masturbation would "reboot" the brain, increase testosterone, strength, manliness, economic success, and sexual confidence; and resolve problems like erectile dysfunction, depression, and bad skin. Medical experts worried that participation in efforts like 90-day abstinence routines could worsen mental health problems like anxiety and depression, especially for those who cannot complete the abstinence period. Some commentators have also criticized the concept of masculinity promoted in masturbation abstinence forums like NoFap as toxic and misogynist.

Abstinence from masturbation has been advocated by some white supremacists since the early 20th century, including modern groups like the Proud Boys and leaders like David Duke (who endorses an unsubstantiated anti-Semitic conspiracy theory that Jews are using pornography to undermine white men).

== Abstinence-only education ==
Abstinence can help prevent the spread of sexually transmitted infections such as HIV, HPV, syphilis, etc. However, abstinence-only education has been found to be less effective at preventing sexually transmitted infections and teenage pregnancy among adolescents than comprehensive sex education.

=== Abstinence-only sex education in the United States ===
Abstinence-only sex education is a form of sex education that teaches abstinence from sex, and often excludes many other types of sexual and reproductive health education, particularly regarding birth control and safe sex. Education programs which focus exclusively on abstinence have hardly been shown to delay sexual activity. Such programs promote sexual abstinence until marriage and often also condemn the use of contraceptives as an alternative. Comprehensive sex education, by contrast, covers the use of contraceptives as well as abstinence.

Organizations such as SIECUS have called abstinence-only programs "fear-based," and "designed to control young people's sexual behavior by instilling fear, shame, and guilt." Author Judith Levine has argued that there might be a natural tendency of abstinence educators to escalate their messages: "Like advertising, which must continually jack up its seduction just to stay visible as other advertising proliferates, abstinence education had to make sex scarier and scarier and, at the same time, chastity sweeter."

In spite of these criticisms, federal government support has made abstinence the de facto focus of sex education in the United States, so that opponents frequently adopt the line that abstinence education is acceptable only if it is combined with other methods, such as instruction in the use of condoms, and easy availability thereof. Most nations of Western Europe use more comprehensive measures, and in sharp contrast to the heated discussion in the U.S., abstinence is hardly discussed as an educational measure.

A U.S. federal government-promoted abstinence-only program was aimed at teens in 1981 in order to discourage premarital sex and unwanted pregnancies. However, recent studies conducted by Mathematica Policy Research showed ineffectiveness of this program. The Responsible Education About Life Act was introduced by Senator Frank Lautenberg (D-NJ) and Representatives Barbara Lee (D-CA) and Christopher Shays (R-CT) to support age-appropriate sexual education. This program is focused to provide teenagers with science-based information on sexual health, so that they can make a sound decision regarding their sex-life.

In 2006, the George W. Bush administration expanded abstinence programs from teens to adults, by introducing programs to encourage unmarried adults to remain abstinent until marriage. Family-planning advocates and researchers denounced the program as unrealistic, due to the rising age of first-time marriage in the United States. In 2009, the Barack Obama administration removed most of the funding from sexual-abstinence education, and instead used the money to fund the Office of Adolescent Health, designed to prevent teenage pregnancy through evidence-based programs. During the Obama administration, between the years 2007 and 2017, the teen pregnancy rate in the US dropped by 50%, according to the Centers for Disease Control and Prevention.

==== Popularity and effectiveness ====
The advent of AIDS helped build a more favorable view of abstinence. However, a review of 13 U.S. sex-abstinence programs involving over 15,000 people by Oxford University found that they do not stop risky sexual behavior, or help in the prevention of unwanted pregnancy. Other studies have found that abstinence-only education does little to affect the "age of sexual initiation; number of sexual partners; and rates of sexual abstinence, condom use, vaginal sex, pregnancy, and sexually transmitted infections (STIs)". Recently, the United States Congress also found similar results in a study conducted by Mathematica Policy Research on abstinence. Currently, there are also issues as to what abstinence means: is it an abstinence from sexual intercourse, or from sexual behavior? Movements such as True Love Waits in America, which ask teenagers to refrain from sex before marriage, are heavily subscribed, but surveys of sexual behavior indicate an increase in the popularity of oral sex.

As of 2017, "The rates of sexually transmitted diseases and pregnancy in American teenagers and young adults are high relative to rates in other industrialized countries."

=== Criticism ===
Alfred Kinsey is widely regarded as the first and among the most influential figures in American sexology. He believed that sexual liberation, as opposed to sexual abstinence, was the key to both a strong marriage and a happy life. Kinsey believed that abstinence was a sexual dysfunction: "The only kinds of sexual dysfunction are abstinence, celibacy and delayed marriage."

== See also ==
- Abstinence, be faithful, use a condom
- Antisexualism
- Harmful to Minors, a book by Judith Levine which deals with sexual morality in the United States
- Generations of Virtue
- Incel – Online subculture
- Making Sense of Abstinence
- No Nut November
- Purity Ball
- Virginity
- Virginity pledge
- Voluntary childlessness
- N-po generation
  - 4B movement
- Satori generation
- Sexless marriage
- Singleton (lifestyle)
