= I'm You =

American political advertisement

"I'm You" was a political advertisement commissioned during the 2010 United States Senate special election in Delaware by Republican candidate Christine O'Donnell. The advertisement opens with O'Donnell stating, "I'm not a witch," in an effort to address controversy surrounding past remarks she had made about dabbling in witchcraft.

== Background ==
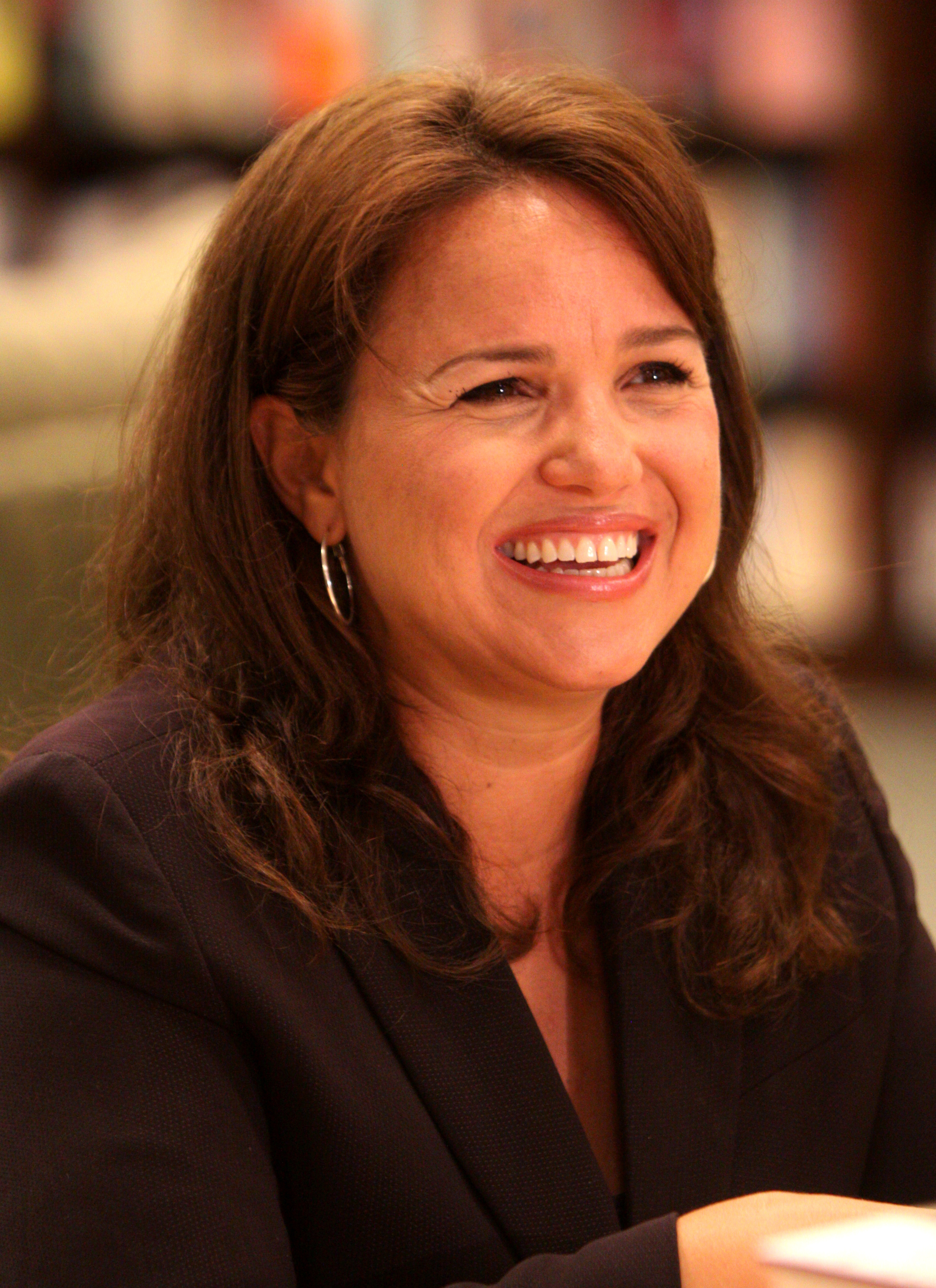
O'Donnell in 2011

Tea Party activist Christine O'Donnell had been a recurring guest panelist on the ABC late-night talk show Politically Incorrect with Bill Maher in the 1990s. On October 29, 1999, during one of her 22 appearances, O'Donnell stated that she had "dabbled into witchcraft" as a teenager, and described a first date that had taken place on what she later described as a "satanic altar."

The clip remained largely obscure until September 17, 2010, — three days after O'Donnell's upset victory in the Republican primary — when Maher aired a portion of the footage on Real Time with Bill Maher. After the clip aired, O'Donnell cancelled scheduled appearances on CBS's Face the Nation and Fox News to attend "church events".

A thirty-second advertisement, titled "I'm You", was produced by Republican media consulstant Fred Davis III, in response to Maher's airing of the tape. The advertisement was uploaded to O'Donnell's YouTube channel on October 4, 2010, before beginning to air throughout Delaware, as well as in Philadelphia, Pennsylvania, and Salisbury, Maryland. The advertisement opened with O'Donnell looking directly at the camera stating, "I'm not a witch. I'm nothing you've heard. I'm you", while a piano soundtrack played.

== Reception ==
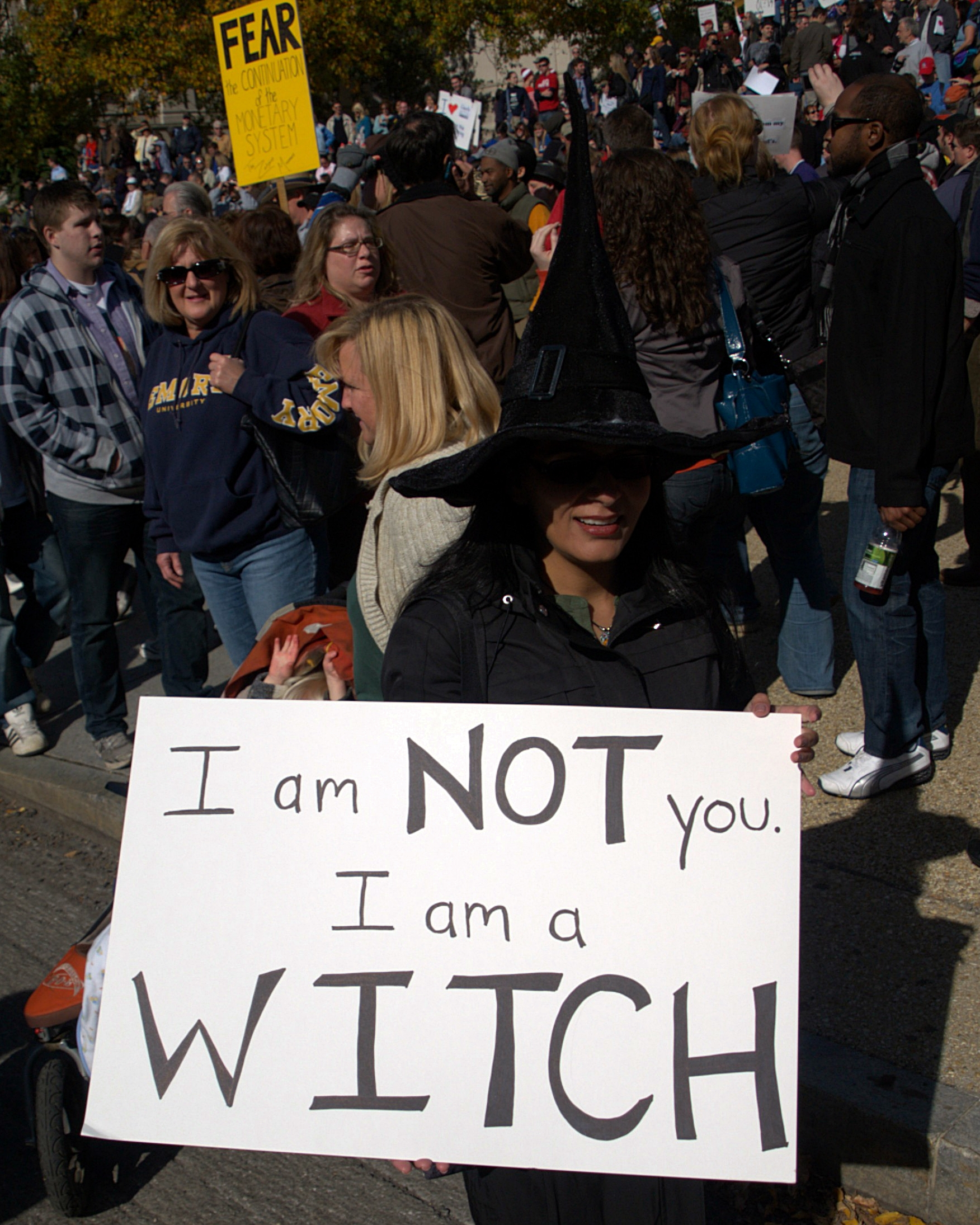
An attendee at the Rally to Restore Sanity and/or Fear parodying "I'm You" in 2010

The advertisement received immediate and extensive media attention. While coverage of the advertisement was overwhemingly negative, Marc Ambinder wrote for The Atlantic that it "defuse[d] some of the tension" about O'Donnell's history with witchcraft. NPR joked that "if in your first TV ad as a candidate for the U.S. Senate you feel compelled to announce 'I am not a witch,' you're in deep trouble." The advertisement's production drew additional commentary, with The Washington Post columnist Eugene Robinson noting that O'Donnell all-black outfit and pale skin, paired with the dark background, made her look like she "might be a witch".

The advertisement generated a large volume of parodies within days of its release. Saturday Night Live parodied the advertisement as the cold open of its season premiere. Kristen Wiig portrayed O'Donnell, playing off the advertisement's "I'm you" tagline with the line "Just like you, I have to constantly deny that I'm a witch." Adding "I'm not a witch" to their list of the worst campaign slogans in U.S. political history, Business Insider described the advertisement as "one of the weirdest campaign videos of all time".

== Aftermath ==
O'Donnell subsequently expressed regret over the decision to air the advertisement. Speaking to ABC's Good Morning America on October 21, 2010, she said that "[o]ur intention was to kill it, and that's not what happened."

In 2012, Bill Maher apologised to O'Donnell on Real Time, saying that he "made [O'Donnell's] life hell and I'm sorry about that." O'Donnell accepted the apology and described the advertisement as a "self-inflicted wound", but went on to claim that she had not personally approved the advertisement before it aired.
