= Christine O'Donnell =

American politician (born 1969)

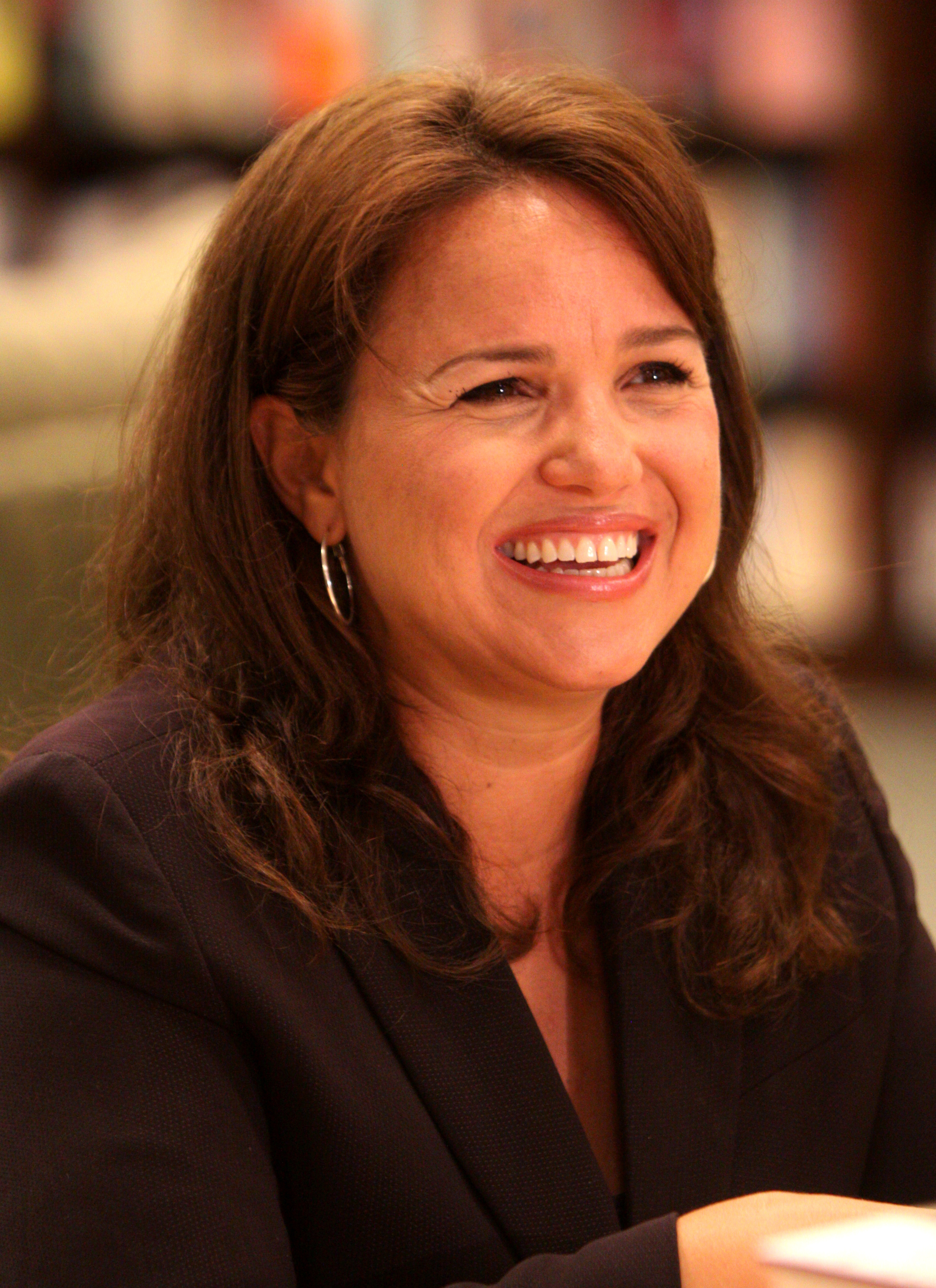
- O'Donnell in 2011

Personal details
- Born: Christine Therese O'Donnell; August 27, 1969 (age 57) Philadelphia, Pennsylvania, U.S.
- Party: Republican
- Education: Fairleigh Dickinson University (BA)
- Website: christine2010.com (Archive)

Christine Therese O'Donnell (born August 27, 1969) is an American conservative activist in the Tea Party movement best known for her 2010 campaign for the United States Senate seat from Delaware vacated by Joe Biden.

O'Donnell was born in Philadelphia and began her career as a public relations and marketing consultant in the early 1990s. After attending Fairleigh Dickinson University, O'Donnell was active in Republican organizations and campaigns. She also worked for such organizations as Enough is Enough and Concerned Women for America. Later, O'Donnell established her own consulting firm.

O'Donnell ran for the U.S. Senate from the state of Delaware in 2006, 2008, and 2010. In 2006, she ran in the Republican primary for Senate, finishing third. She then ran as a write-in in the general election, drawing four percent of the vote. In 2008, she was the Republican nominee, losing to incumbent Senator Joe Biden, 65% to 35%. In 2010, with strong financial support from the Tea Party movement and an endorsement from Sarah Palin, O'Donnell upset nine-term U.S. Representative and former governor Mike Castle in Delaware's Republican primary for the U.S. Senate; Castle had been favored to win the general election.

O'Donnell's primary win caused an uproar among the political establishment. During the general election campaign, O'Donnell received national media attention for her campaign advertisement, "I'm You", in which she declared that she was "not a witch". She lost the 2010 general election to Democrat Chris Coons by a margin of 57% to 40%.

== Early life and education ==
O'Donnell was born in Philadelphia and raised in Moorestown, New Jersey. She is the fifth of the six children of Carole (Chillano) and Daniel O'Donnell. Her mother is of Italian descent and her father is of Irish descent. O'Donnell has said that at times, her father had to work three jobs to make ends meet. He worked part-time in community theatre and on local television, and did a brief stint as Bozo the Clown in the 1960s.

O'Donnell graduated from Moorestown High School in 1987, where she was a member of the drama club and a student announcer. She attended Fairleigh Dickinson University (FDU) beginning in 1987, initially majoring in theater, but later changing to English literature with a concentration in communications. O'Donnell later told The New York Times she had three senior years of college. O'Donnell received a bachelor's degree in English literature from Fairleigh Dickinson in September 2010.

== Early career ==
O'Donnell first held political office in 1991 when she worked the polls for the College Republicans. She was a youth leader for the Bush–Quayle campaign and attended the 1992 Republican National Convention. While there she began making media contacts, meeting daily with a CNN producer and giving television interviews that offered a college student's perspective on the convention. The following year, O'Donnell worked for three months in Washington, D.C. for the anti-pornography organization Enough is Enough. She then spent two years working in the communications office of the Republican National Committee (RNC) in Washington D.C. O'Donnell later became a spokesperson for the conservative Christian group Concerned Women for America.

In 1996 O'Donnell attended the Republican National Convention in San Diego, moved to Los Angeles, and founded her own advocacy organization, The Savior's Alliance for Lifting the Truth (SALT), serving as its president. SALT lobbied the U.S. Congress on moral issues and promoted Christian values, including sexual abstinence before marriage, to the college-age generation. In the 1990s, O'Donnell took a public stance against masturbation, calling it "sinful" and equating it with adultery. O'Donnell appeared on Fox News, MSNBC and C-Span as a representative of SALT. She also appeared on MTV's Sex In The 90s, advocating sexual "purity", and was a regular guest panelist on Bill Maher's ABC show Politically Incorrect, appearing in at least 22 episodes. In a 1996 discussion on CNN, O'Donnell advocated the teaching of creationism in public schools and criticized Darwin's theory of evolution on the ground that it is "merely a theory" or "a myth". She asserted that "there is just as much, if not more, evidence supporting [creationism]." In the late 1990s O'Donnell moved back to Washington, D.C., where she continued her advocacy work. In 1998 she published an article in Cultural Dissident entitled "The Case for Chastity". In 2002 she was a Claremont Institute Lincoln Fellow. In 2003 she wrote an article, "The Women of Middle Earth," for the Catholic Exchange.

In February 2003 O'Donnell moved to Delaware to work for the Intercollegiate Studies Institute (ISI), a non-profit conservative publisher of educational materials and bought a house in Wilmington. In 2004, she filed a complaint against ISI with the EEOC saying that she had been demoted due to gender discrimination. Later, on February 26, 2004, she was fired, and in 2005 she sued ISI in federal court for $6.9 million for wrongful termination, claiming gender discrimination and that her firing was retaliation for talking to the EEOC. She said ISI's actions caused her mental anguish and were a consequence of "ISI's conservative beliefs". O'Donnell dropped the suit in 2008, stating she could no longer afford an attorney.

After leaving ISI, O'Donnell started her own media consulting and marketing company. She founded the Catholic Advocacy Network and again began making media appearances. Between the 2006 and 2008 elections, she did pro bono advocacy work opposing the disconnection of a feeding tube for a young woman who was in a persistent vegetative state.

== Political campaigns ==
=== 2006 U.S. Senate election in Delaware ===
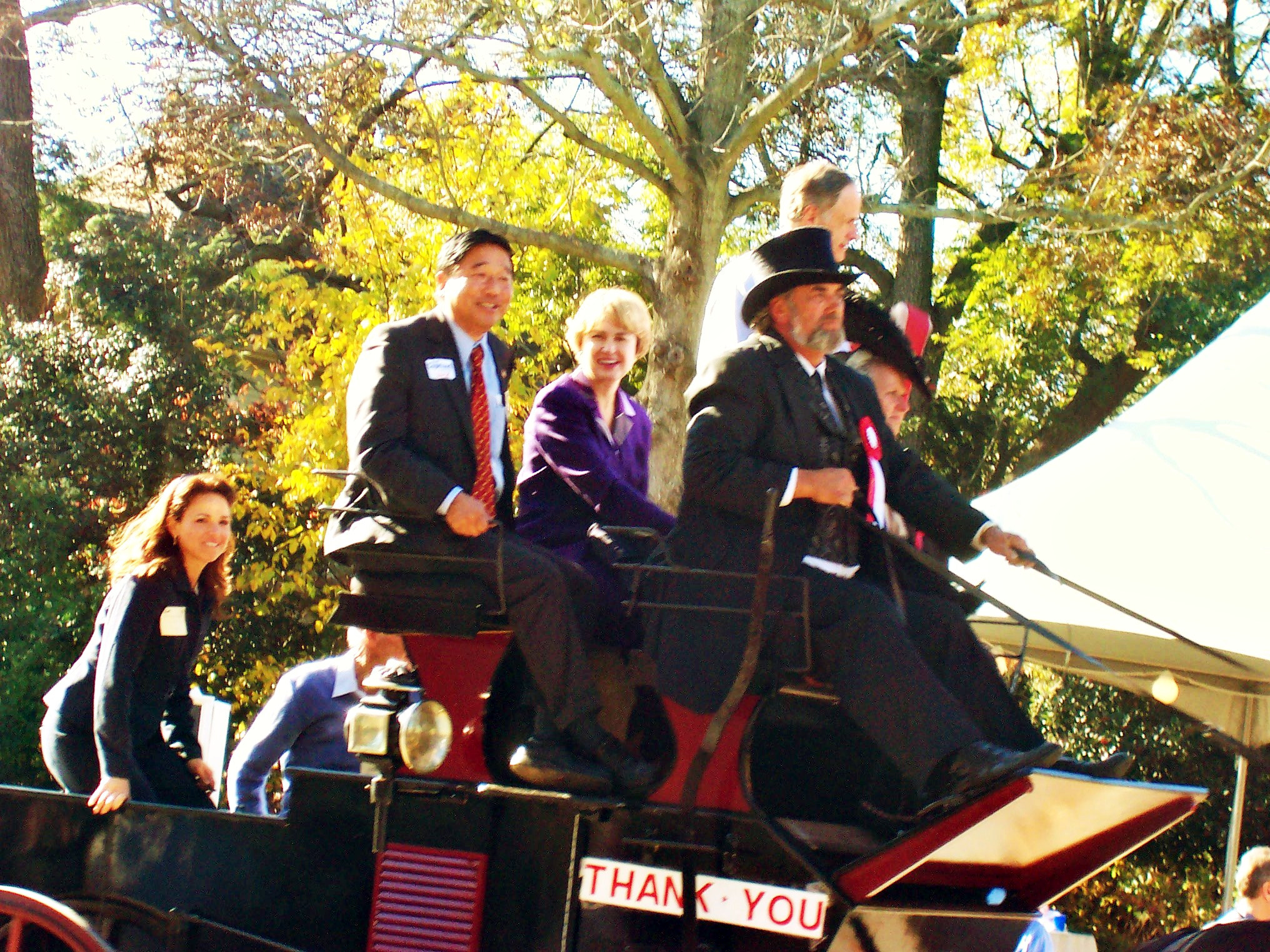
O'Donnell (far left) at a 2006 parade in Georgetown, Delaware, with Senator Tom Carper and other candidates

In 2006, supporters of the anti-abortion movement asked O'Donnell if she wanted to run against Delaware Senator Tom Carper. O'Donnell ran in the Republican primary for the 2006 U.S. Senate election in Delaware.

In a 2006 interview for a campaign profile, O'Donnell told The News Journal that gay people have a psychological defect and that "People are created in God's image. Homosexuality is an identity adopted through societal factors. It's an identity disorder." During a primary debate against her Republican opponents, O'Donnell said that China could not be a friend of the U.S. because among other things, it forced women to have abortions and prohibited the reading of the Bible. She also said China was plotting to take over the United States, and that she had classified information which supported her claim.

O'Donnell finished in third place in the Republican primary with 17 percent of the vote, behind winner Jan C. Ting and second-place finisher Michael D. Protack. She then ran in the general election against Ting and incumbent Senator Tom Carper as a write-in candidate, finishing with 11,127 votes, (4 percent of the total votes cast), a number that was considered remarkably large for a write-in and which gave her hope for the 2008 election.

=== 2008 U.S. Senate election in Delaware ===
O'Donnell became the nominee of the Republican Party for the United States Senate in 2008 after defeating businessman Tim Smith at the May 3, 2008 state party convention with more than 60 percent of the GOP delegate vote.

O'Donnell's candidacy was endorsed by Mississippi Governor Haley Barbour, former astronaut Buzz Aldrin, former Delaware Governor Pierre DuPont, and conservative writer and policy advocate David Horowitz. Her general election opponent was the state's longest serving Senator, Joe Biden, who was also running for Vice President on the Obama-Biden ticket. O'Donnell questioned Biden's dual campaigns, claiming that serving his constituents was not important to him and criticizing his unwillingness to participate in debates and candidate forums. Opinion polling during the race showed that O'Donnell trailed Biden by a two-to-one margin. In the general election on November 4, 2008, Biden defeated O'Donnell by 65 percent to 35 percent.

O'Donnell's campaign ended the 2008 fiscal year $19,656.29 in debt.

=== 2010 U.S. Senate election in Delaware ===
Following the 2008 election, Biden resigned his Senate seat to become Vice President of the United States, and Governor Ruth Ann Minner appointed Biden's chief of staff, Ted Kaufman, to serve out the first two years of Biden's six year Senate term. A special election would be held coincident with the 2010 general elections to choose who would fill the Senate seat for the remaining four years. In December 2008, O'Donnell announced that she would run for U.S. Senate again in 2010. O'Donnell said that her biggest mistake in her earlier campaigns was not having enough funds. In October 2009, she reiterated that she was running despite the entrance into the race of Republican Congressman and former Governor Mike Castle.

In January 2010, Democrat Beau Biden, a son of Joe Biden, indicated he would not run, and Castle became the favorite to take the seat.

==== Primary election ====
On March 10, 2010, O'Donnell officially announced her candidacy before a small group of supporters at University of Delaware's Wilmington campus. In her remarks, O'Donnell criticized reckless government spending, said that Castle was the most liberal Republican in the House, and predicted that the Tea Party movement and grassroots anti-incumbent trends would be in her favor.

When a report from The News Journal in March 2010 detailed her personal fiscal difficulties, O'Donnell attributed the problems to misunderstandings and errors. She also said, "I think the fact that I have struggled financially is what makes me so sympathetic." Her financial problems became a focal point of establishment Republican attacks. The chair of the state Republican Party, Tom Ross, said, "She's a candidate who runs for office that unfortunately lives off the proceeds." Several commentators said the attacks showed elements of sexism. The Delaware Republican Party sponsored last minute robocalls from former O'Donnell staff members charging that O'Donnell was "no conservative" and was financially irresponsible. O'Donnell responded by saying the attacks on her finances were an insult to Delaware voters.

In the final weeks before the primary, O'Donnell became firmly allied with the Tea Party movement which provided last minute funding to her campaign amounting to more than $250,000, according to Fox News, with the Tea Party Express saying it might spend as much as $600,000 backing O'Donnell.

Castle ignored O'Donnell's candidacy and refused to debate her, calling her dishonest. In early September a political consulting firm hired by O'Donnell released a Web video insinuating that Castle was having a homosexual affair. O'Donnell attempted to distance herself from the claim, stating that the consulting firm was no longer working for her campaign. She then appeared on Mark Levin's radio show, accusing Castle of engaging in "unmanly tactics" during the campaign and saying, "this is not a bake-off, put your man-pants on."

National attention brought additional scrutiny of her record, and repeated questions about the accuracy of her statements from national and local political leaders and news media including Karl Rove, the state's largest newspaper, The News Journal, and local conservative radio host and former supporter Dan Gaffney of WGMD radio. O'Donnell's responses consisted of correcting the information, brushing it aside, or downplaying the discrepancies.

O'Donnell won the September 14, 2010, primary election by six percentage points over Castle, garnering more than 30,000 votes altogether, and becoming the eighth Tea Party-backed candidate to oust a GOP establishment candidate in a 2010 primary contest. According to The New York Times, her support largely came from the southern part of the state where Republican voters are socially conservative and against gun control.

Following O'Donnell's primary win, Politico published an article entitled "Meet Christine O'Donnell..." that began with the following sentence:

The Republican Party's hopes for winning back the Senate rest on a perennial candidate with a sketchy employment history who has dissembled about her education, defaulted on her student loan and her mortgage, sued a former employer for mental anguish, railed against the evils of masturbation and questioned whether it would have been OK to lie to prevent Nazis from killing Jews during World War II.

==== Endorsements ====
By July 2010, O'Donnell had received endorsements from the Tea Party Express, which called her a "strong voice for conservative constitutionalist principles". She was also endorsed by the Susan B. Anthony List and the Family Research Council. In the final days before the primary, she received endorsements from the NRA Political Victory Fund, U.S. Senator Jim DeMint, Sarah Palin, and conservative commentators Rush Limbaugh, Sean Hannity, and Mark Levin.

==== General election ====
Following her primary victory, O'Donnell urged voters to keep an open mind about the unflattering picture that was being painted of her, and suggested that media reports are not always accurate. She delivered a speech to the Values Voter Summit in Washington, D.C., on September 17, 2010, saying that anti-American elites were trying to marginalize mainstream, core conservatives.

After winning the primary, O'Donnell began employing staffers from various states, including Michigan, New York, Pennsylvania, Texas and Virginia, and hired a Virginia public affairs firm, Shirley & Banister, that has served major conservative clients. In early October, it was noted that O'Donnell's campaign had raised more money from outside Delaware than within the state, leading to questions of whether out-of-state contributors will have more influence over the general election than Delaware residents. By September 30, O'Donnell's general election campaign had received nearly $4 million in contributions from all over the country. Those contributions continued despite an October 28 Fairleigh Dickinson University PublicMind poll that showed O'Donnell trailing Democrat Chris Coons 36% to 57%.

O'Donnell's educational record came under media scrutiny during her general election campaign. Despite her 2006 campaign website describing her as a "graduate of Fairleigh Dickinson University," she had not been awarded her bachelor's degree in English literature until September 2010 – 17 years after leaving the school and two weeks before her 2010 Republican primary. O'Donnell's campaign originally credited the delay to financial issues (alleging that her diploma was withheld until she paid off student loans), but later reported that she had finished a final degree requirement during the summer of 2010.

Also, in a 2005 lawsuit, O'Donnell had claimed her employer broke its promise to give her time to pursue a master's degree at Princeton, forcing her to drop out of attending non-degree courses there. Journalists confirmed that O'Donnell was never officially enrolled in the university and only took non-degree courses at Princeton, as she had claimed. Other criticisms involved profiles on LinkedIn and MySpace claiming she had studied at Oxford University in England (a spokesperson for O'Donnell confirmed it was a reference to a certificate she obtained from a course at Oxford overseen by the Phoenix Institute and denies it was presented "as a course run by Oxford University") and at the Claremont Graduate University in Southern California. O'Donnell's attendance at the Claremont Institute was confirmed, but a LinkedIn profile listed her as attending the Claremont Graduate University. The MySpace page was presented as dating from 2008, but actually listed her age at 41 years old, thereby dating it from August 2010. O'Donnell responded, "I never established a LinkedIn profile or authorized anyone to do so on my behalf."

On September 17, 2010, comedian Bill Maher aired a clip of O'Donnell from the October 29, 1999, episode of his old show Politically Incorrect on his current show Real Time with Bill Maher, in which O'Donnell said, "I dabbled into witchcraft – I never joined a coven. ... I hung around people who were doing these things... We went to a movie and then had a little midnight picnic on a satanic altar. And I didn't know it." Her admission received widespread media coverage, and O'Donnell explained that she had been referring to high school experiences.

O'Donnell followed up with a TV campaign ad for the general election, known as "I'm You", in which she declared, "I'm not a witch." This ad inspired many video parodies, the most famous of which was a parody by comedian Kristen Wiig on Saturday Night Live. O'Donnell later said that the ad backfired and focused attention on her decade-old statement. Maher apologized to O'Donnell on his show in 2012 stating, "I know when I brought out the witch tape I made your life hell and I'm sorry about that. ... I gotta say, I don't agree with your ideas but it shouldn't have hung on that stupid witch thing." O'Donnell accepted the apology from Maher and blamed herself for the "I'm not a witch" advertisement.

After the September 14, 2010 primary, Citizens for Responsibility and Ethics in Washington (CREW) alleged that O'Donnell made false statements on Federal Election Commission filings and illegally used more than $20,000 of her campaign funds as "her very own personal piggy bank" by claiming campaign expenses during a time when she was not a candidate in 2009. CREW filed a complaint on September 20, 2010, with the FEC and asked the U.S. Attorney in Delaware to investigate these allegations. O'Donnell responded to the accusations, telling reporters there was "no truth to it. I personally have not misused the campaign funds" and refused to answer specific questions about her finances when asked by CNN. In December 2010, the AP reported that federal authorities had opened a criminal investigation into CREW's complaint. On July 15, 2011, the Federal US Attorney's Office announced it had closed the criminal investigation of Christine O'Donnell's campaign finances and has referred the case to the FEC for administrative enforcement. Another FEC complaint filed against the O'Donnell campaign by CREW for improper coordination of events and expenses between O'Donnell's 2010 Primary campaign and the Tea Party Express in California was subsequently dismissed by the FEC when the FEC Commissioner's vote was tied 3–3 on whether to proceed with the case, even through the FEC's own lawyers believed that there was sufficient evidence for the FEC to proceed to investigate these allegations against the O'Donnell campaign and the Tea Party Express.

O'Donnell's year-end campaign financial report to the Federal Election Commission reported that her campaign returned $56,124 of campaign donations between October 2010 and December 2010, and had still retained $654,336.

In 2016, a judge ruled that O'Donnell violated federal law by using campaign funds to pay her personal rent and utility bills in 2010.

During a debate between O'Donnell and opponent Chris Coons on October 13, 2010, O'Donnell was asked what Supreme Court cases she disagreed with. O'Donnell drew a blank and asked co-moderator Nancy Karibjanian to name one for her, which Karibjanian refused to do.

In an October 19, 2010, debate at the Widener University School of Law in Wilmington, O'Donnell challenged Coons on the topic of the separation of church and state, asking, "Where in the Constitution is separation of church and state?" After laughter from the audience, Coons responded, "The First Amendment establishes the separation and the fact that the federal government shall not establish any religion, and decisional law by the Supreme Court over many, many decades clarifies and enshrines that there is a separation of church and state that our courts and laws must respect". O'Donnell replied, "Let me just clarify. You're telling me that separation of church and state is found in the First Amendment?" Coons responded, "Government shall make no establishment of religion" (a slight misquotation of the text of the First Amendment: "Congress shall make no law respecting an establishment of religion"). O'Donnell asked, "That's in the First Amendment?"

During the debate, O'Donnell criticized Coons for agreeing with the United States Supreme Court that teaching creationism in public schools violates the Constitution. She also stated that Coons' belief that the theory of evolution should be taught in public schools was an example of how he believes in big government mandates and "imposing...beliefs on the local schools". O'Donnell was asked whether she supported the repeal of the Fourteenth, Sixteenth, and Seventeenth Amendments to the U.S. Constitution. She knew that the Seventeenth Amendment concerned the direct election of U.S. senators by popular vote and said she would not repeal it, but could not recall the other two.

In the week prior to the general election, the talk radio station WDEL reported that O'Donnell and her campaign manager had threatened to sue if it released a video of an interview she gave at the station. The campaign manager, Matt Moran, was alleged to have threatened to "crush WDEL" with a lawsuit. The O'Donnell campaign subsequently apologized, saying that the incident had been the result of a misunderstanding.

A July 2010 hypothetical match-up poll by Rasmussen showed O'Donnell running ahead of Chris Coons by a margin of 2 points (41 to 39 percent).

Post-primary polls found O'Donnell trailing Coons by 15%, 9%, 17%, 19%, 11%, and 10%, respectively.

On November 2, 2010, O'Donnell lost the general election to Coons by a margin of 57% to 40%.

=== Political positions ===
O'Donnell has said she did not believe in regulating private sexual behavior. O'Donnell stated that if elected to the Senate, she would base her political actions on the Constitution rather than her personal beliefs. She specifically disavowed her 1996 anti-masturbation stance, saying "I was a pundit. I was very passionate in my 20s and wanted to share my beliefs."

O'Donnell has identified herself as a member of the "values movement", and supports government restrictions on abortion care. She opposes abortion, including in cases of rape and incest, but if the woman was otherwise going to die, she would allow family members to decide which life to save. O'Donnell opposes human embryonic stem cell research, human cloning, and research into cloning monkey embryos. In 2007 on The O'Reilly Factor, O'Donnell expressed her moral concerns about stem cell research, and said, "American scientific companies are cross-breeding humans and animals and coming up with mice with fully functioning human brains. So they're already into this experiment."

O'Donnell has vowed that she will never vote to increase taxes. She has supported a balanced budget amendment, opposed Congressional earmarks, and supported a simplification of the tax code.

O'Donnell has said that Democrats have prevented the U.S. from attaining energy independence by curtailing the drilling of oil in the Gulf of Mexico. She has supported the building of more refineries, as well as the use of Delaware's agricultural products in gasoline. She opposes cap and trade legislation.

O'Donnell stated that if elected to the U.S. Senate, her first priority would be to vote to repeal the Obamacare legislation enacted by Congress in 2010. She signed the Tea Party activists' "Contract from America," which pledged to replace Obamacare with a health insurance system that is "competitive, open, and transparent free-market."

O'Donnell has favored increasing penalties for employers who hire illegal immigrants. She has supported raising the age for receiving Social Security benefits.

In reply to a 2010 question as to whether she would support Senator Mitch McConnell of Kentucky as the Republican leader of the Senate, O'Donnell shrugged and said, "I wouldn't not support him".

== Career after 2010 ==
In December 2010, O'Donnell announced the formation of a political action committee (PAC) called "ChristinePAC" to address health care and tax issues. Paperwork for the PAC was filed with the Federal Election Commission in January 2011. The filing indicated that the PAC would not be used to fund candidates for federal office. In a letter to supporters on February 8, 2011, O'Donnell stated that her PAC would allow her "to counter attack left-wing groups, fight the liberal media and support conservative candidates against the liberal-controlled GOP establishment".

In 2011, O'Donnell published Troublemaker: Let's Do What It Takes To Make America Great Again. In August 2011, O'Donnell appeared on Piers Morgan Tonight to promote the book, but ended the interview after host Piers Morgan questioned her about gay marriage.

As of February 2015, O'Donnell was employed as a columnist for The Washington Times.

In a March 2016 CNN appearance, O'Donnell spoke out against Donald Trump. O'Donnell stated that she could not tolerate Trump as a Republican presidential nominee, accused him of "inciting riots", and added that she could not understand why evangelical leaders supported him.

== Electoral history ==
Year	Office	Election	Winner	Party	Votes	Pct	Opponent	Party	Votes	Pct	Opponent	Party	Votes	Pct
2006	U.S. Senator	Primary	Jan C. Ting	Republican	6,110	43%	Michael D. Protack	Republican	5,771	40%	Christine O'Donnell	Republican	2,505	17%
2006	U.S. Senator	General	Thomas R. Carper	Democratic	170,567	70%	Jan C. Ting	Republican	69,734	29%	Christine O'Donnell	Write-in	11,127	4% (Note: Write-in votes were not counted as part of the official tally of election results for candidates on the ballot, which is why the vote totals add up to 103%. See, "The Power of One Vote: State of Delaware 2006 Election Results" (PDF). Delaware Commissioner of Elections. pp. 2, 28ff. Archived from the original (PDF) on February 13, 2008.)
2008	U.S. Senator	Primary	Christine O'Donnell	Republican	n/a	n/a	Uncontested							
2008	U.S. Senator	General	Joe Biden	Democratic	257,484	64.7%	Christine O'Donnell	Republican	140,584	35.3%				
2010	U.S. Senator (Special)	Primary	Christine O'Donnell	Republican	30,561	53.1%	Michael N. Castle	Republican	27,021	46.9%				
2010	U.S. Senator (Special)	General	Chris Coons	Democratic	173,900	56.6%	Christine O'Donnell	Republican	123,025	40.0%				

== Personal life ==
O'Donnell was single as of 2010.

=== Financial issues ===
In October 2007 O'Donnell stopped paying the mortgage of her Wilmington house and the mortgage company obtained a judgment against her in the spring of 2008 for $90,000. The house was to be sold at a sheriff's auction in August 2008 when she sold it the month prior to her Senate campaign to an attorney who was also her boyfriend at the time.

The day O'Donnell filed to run for Senate, her tax records were accessed by a Delaware state employee. Records of the access were destroyed according to officials of the State of Delaware. The same day, Internal Revenue Service (IRS) filed a lien in 2010 (on the day she announced her run for the open U.S. Senate seat), on the house that O'Donnell had not owned for two years, claiming that O'Donnell owed $11,744 in back taxes and penalties as a result from a formerly owned house. O'Donnell posted documents on her website showing that the lien was a mistake, as the audit was not yet complete and there was not yet any final determination of whether she owed any further taxes or not, and noted that the IRS agent handling the matter claimed he was perplexed by the agency's actions. The lien was later removed, as the IRS said it was an error caused by a computer glitch. O'Donnell believes she was politically targeted. In 2010 campaign finance reports, she listed herself as self-employed.

In November 2014, the IRS placed another lien on O'Donnell's accounts, claiming she owed $30,000 from a house transaction. O'Donnell disputed the lien, and was informed it was an error, and her account would be restored. The lien was removed but O'Donnell claims the IRS also emptied her account before unfreezing it and said that as of Christmas Day 2014 the funds had not been returned.

=== Religious views ===
Raised as a Catholic, O'Donnell found her interest in her family religion waning during her teenage years while she considered various beliefs and searched for spiritual truth. As noted above, on October 29, 1999, in an interview for Politically Incorrect with Bill Maher, O'Donnell stated that she had "dabbled into witchcraft".

Originally a political liberal who believed in abortion rights, O'Donnell has said she experienced an epiphany at age 21 when she saw graphic descriptions and pictures in medical journals of how an abortion is performed. "There's only truth and not truth," O'Donnell said she realized at that moment. "You're either very good or evil." She dropped her acting aspirations, began thinking about moral issues, and became an evangelical Christian, due to the appeal of the moral certainty she felt the movement offered. She chose to live a chaste life, began espousing sexual abstinence, and joined the College Republicans.

In a 1998 interview, O'Donnell said: "We took the Bible and prayer out of public schools. Now we're having weekly shootings. We had the '60s sexual revolution, and now people are dying of AIDS." O'Donnell identifies as a young earth creationist, and in 2011, on the subject of evolution, she said, "You know what, evolution is a myth... Why aren't monkeys still evolving into humans?"

In 2010, O'Donnell stated that she was open to attending both Catholic and Protestant services. In an interview on September 4, 2011, for Florida Daily NewsMakers with Jeff Lytle, she stated that she was a devout and practicing Catholic.

== Bibliography ==
- O'Donnell, Christine (2011). Troublemaker: Let's Do What It Takes to Make America Great Again, St. Martin's Press, ISBN 0-312-64305-5.

== Notes ==
Party political offices
Preceded by Raymond Clatworthy	Republican nominee for U.S. Senator from Delaware (Class 2); 2008, 2010	Succeeded by Kevin Wade
