= MOPS International =

MomCo by MOPS International is a Christian organization focused on gathering and supporting moms.

MomCo believes that good things happen when moms come together.

MOPS (an acronym that stands for “Mothers of Preschoolers”) International, Inc. is headquartered in Denver, Colorado. The organization had its first meeting in February 1973 in Wheat Ridge, Colorado, established a board of directors in 1981, and was incorporated under the name MOPS Outreach. The name was later changed to MOPS, Inc. In 1988, as they expanded beyond the US, the name was changed again, to MOPS International, Inc.

In 2023, MOPS International rebranded to MomCo.

Original founders included Marlene Seidel and seven others at Trinity Baptist Church.
