= Yudghanites =

Heterodox Jewish sect of late antiquity

The Yudghanites ("Al-Yudghaniyyah") were a Jewish sect named after its founder, Yudghan or Judah of Hamadan, a disciple of Abu Isa al-Isfahani.

== History ==
Shortly after the defeat of Abu Isa and his followers (the Isawites) at Rayy early in the eighth century, Yudghan conceived the project of forming a new sect from the scattered followers of his master. More prudent than Abu Isa, Yudghan did not pretend to have been entrusted by God with the mission of delivering the Jews from the rule of the Gentiles and of making them politically independent, but confined himself to the rôle of a prophet and teacher, assuming the surname of "al-Ra'i" (= "the Shepherd").

Yudghan gained many followers, who maintained their beliefs long after the death of their master. Their faith in him was so great that they declared he had not died, but would appear again in order to bring a new doctrine with him.

Shahrastani relates that after the death of Yudghan a follower of his named Mushka founded a new sect called "Al-Mushkaniyyah." The tenets of the new sect were the same as those of the Yudghanites, with the single addition of an injunction to forcibly impose the doctrines of Yudghan upon all Jews. Mushka marched out of Hamadan with a troop of followers, but they were all killed in the vicinity of Qom.

According to some scholars, Saadia Gaon in criticizing "the so-called Jews" who believed in reincarnation, had in mind the Yudghanites, who were still in existence in his time. Although this is not impossible, it is highly improbable, since no mention is made by either Shahrastani or Ḳirḳisani of such a belief among the tenets of the Yudghanites. It is more probable that Saadia referred not to a special Jewish sect, but to all those, among either the Karaites or the Rabbinites, who held to the doctrine of Pythagoras.

== Beliefs ==
Influenced by the doctrines of Sufism, which at that time began to spread among Persian Muslims, Yudghan set aside the literal meaning of the words of the Torah in favor of a mystic or spiritual interpretation. Like the Sufis, he taught that all religious beliefs, such as those relating to paradise, hell, etc., are allegories; but, on the other hand, he opposed the Sufic doctrine of predestination, and declared that man possesses free will and is therefore responsible for his actions. He asserted (probably under Muʿtazila influence) that God may not be represented with material attributes, i.e., anthropomorphically.

Yudghan retained the Isawite prohibitions of wine and animal food, and probably also the institution of seven daily prayers instead of the three rabbinical ones. He attached more importance to praying and fasting than to the observance of the ceremonial laws. He held that the laws concerning Shabbat and the festivals were not binding in the Diaspora, but were observed merely as a remembrance.

Like Abu Isa, Yudghan declared that Jesus and Mohammed were prophets, and that each was sent as a missionary to his nation. According to Ḳirḳisani, both Abu Isa and Yudghan took this attitude for diplomatic reasons; for had they not recognized the post-Biblical prophets, their own claim to prophetic inspiration would very likely have been challenged.
