= Golden mean (Judaism) =

In Jewish literature, the golden mean (Hebrew: "שביל הזהב", "דרך האמצע", "דרך האמצעית") is primarily associated with the philosopher Rambam, and was influenced by the Greek philosopher Aristotle. In Mishneh Torah, Rambam attributes the method to the first scholars (Chazal) and to Abraham. Similar concepts exist in the Rabbinic literature, Tosefta, the Yerushalmi, and Musar literature. Rabbi Yitzhak Arama also finds references in the Bible.

Rambam determined that a person needs to take care of the soul as well as the body, and just as a sick person turns to a doctor, a person with mental illness must turn to the doctor of the soul, which is the philosopher or the sage. Rambam opposed the deterministic approach, arguing that a person has free will and the ability to shape his or her life.

The concepts are part of a system which aims to improve the mental and moral qualities of a person. The hallmark of this method is its simplicity, presented as a part of Rambam's perception about the nature of the soul in the fourth chapter of his introduction to Pirkei Avot in the Mishnah (also known as the "Eight Chapters").

The golden mean is also a core principle in Musar literature in which practitioners are encouraged to bring every character trait (middah; plural middot) into a balanced place between extremes. For example, it is not good to have too much patience, but it is not good to live without any patience at all. Musar can be said to involve being mindful enough to bring one's character traits, thoughts and desires into a balanced state in real time.

There are exceptions to this rule. Maimonides writes that arrogance should be met with very great humility, and that anger should be avoided to the opposite extreme, even when anger might appear warranted.

== See also ==
- Golden mean (philosophy)
- Ethics
