= 2010 United States Senate special election in Delaware =

- November 2, 2010
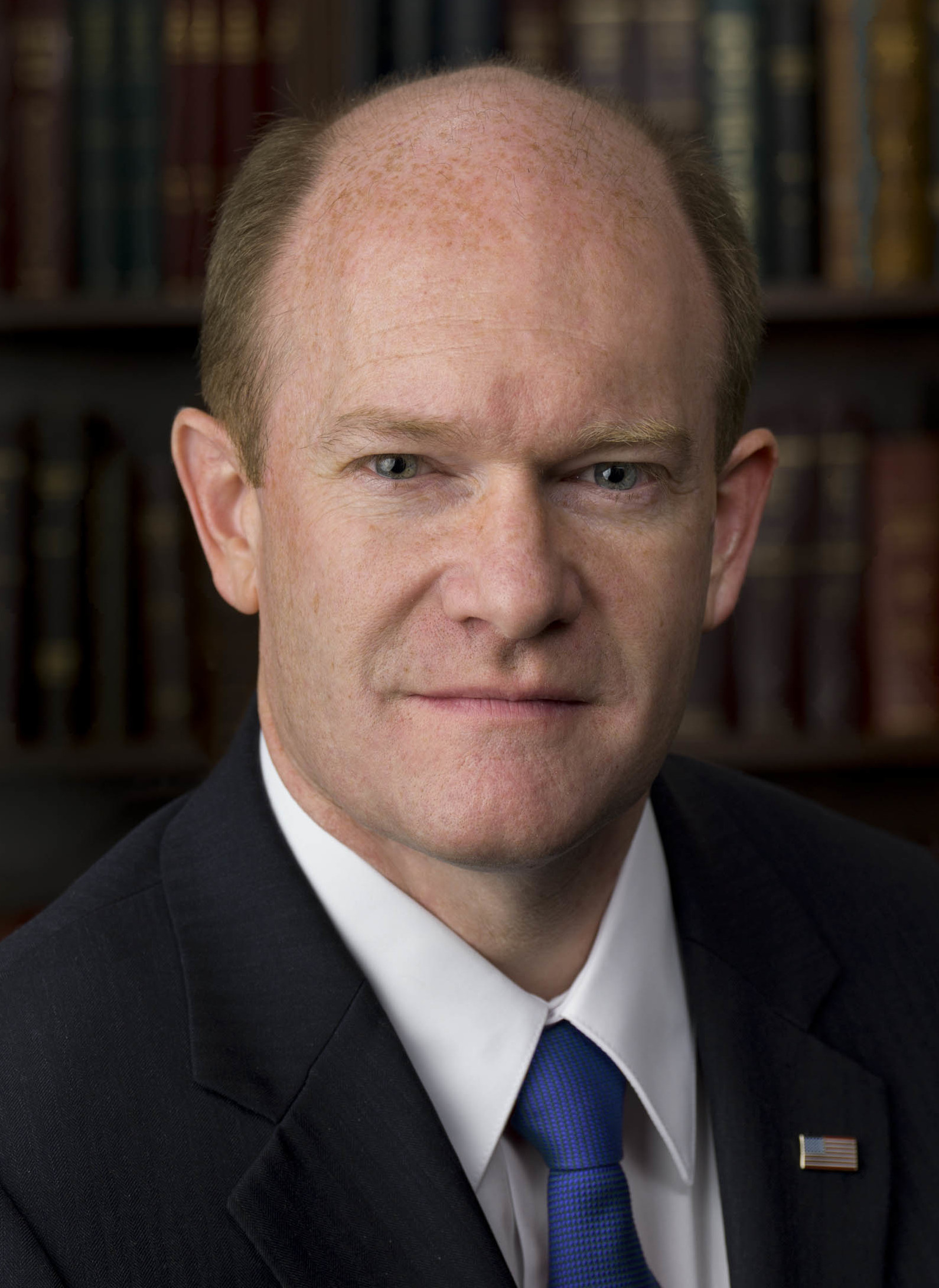

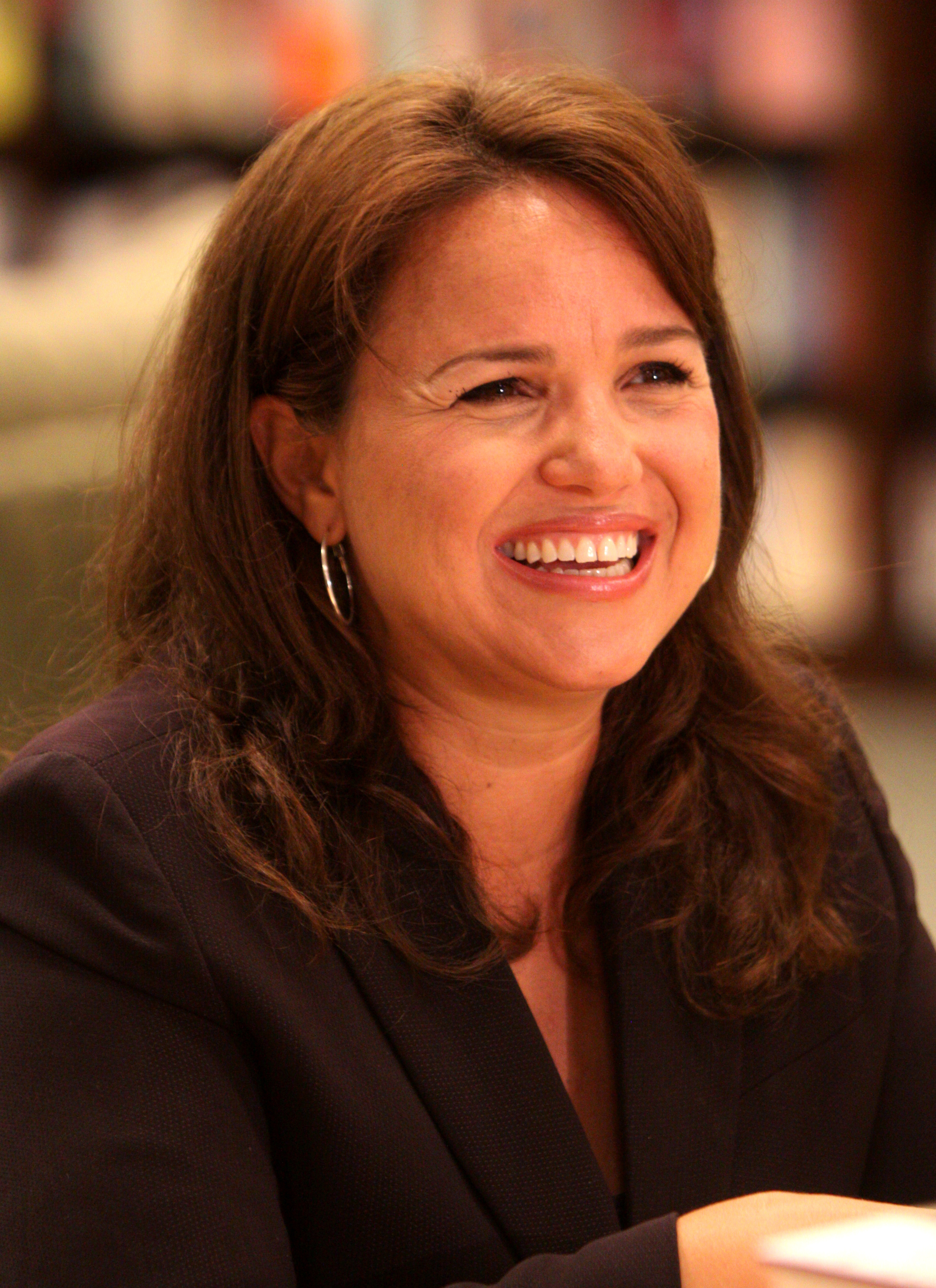
Nominee	Chris Coons	Christine O'Donnell
Party	Democratic	Republican
Popular vote	174,012	123,053
Percentage	56.61%	40.03%
- Coons: 40–50% 50–60% 60–70% 70–80% 80–90% >90% O'Donnell: 50–60% 60–70%
U.S. senator before election
Ted Kaufman (Note: In January 2009, Kaufman was appointed by Governor Ruth Ann Minner to fill the vacancy caused by the resignation of Senator Joe Biden, who had elected Vice President of the United States.)
Democratic
Elected U.S. Senator
Chris Coons
Democratic

The 2010 United States Senate special election in Delaware took place on November 2, 2010, concurrently with elections to the United States Senate in other states, as well as elections to the United States House of Representatives and various state and local elections. It was a special election to fill Delaware's Class II Senate seat, then held by Democrat Ted Kaufman, an appointee. The seat had been previously held by the state's longest-serving senator, Democrat Joe Biden, who vacated it when he became Vice President of the United States in 2009.

The state's primary election occurred on September 14, 2010. Republican U.S. Representative and former Governor Mike Castle was believed to be heavily favored to win both the primary and the general election. However, Castle was upset by Christine O'Donnell in a primary contest that had national visibility. During the general election campaign, O'Donnell, a Tea Party candidate, drew media attention for making several false claims and gaffes, as well as an unusual campaign ad in which she denied that she was a witch. In the general election, O'Donnell lost to Democratic nominee Chris Coons by a vote of 57% to 40%. Coons was sworn in on November 15, 2010, and served out the remainder of the term ending in 2015.

== Background ==
In this seat's most recent election in 2008, longtime Democratic incumbent Joe Biden had defeated Republican Christine O'Donnell. However, Biden was also elected Vice President of the United States in 2008 and was required to resign from the Senate by Article I, Section 6 of the United States Constitution in order to assume the Vice Presidency. Although Biden was sworn in for a seventh term early in January 2009, he resigned from the Senate on January 15, 2009, and was succeeded by Kaufman the following day.

Those discussed as possible appointees to replace Biden included his son, Delaware Attorney General Beau Biden, outgoing Lt. Gov. John Carney, Delaware Supreme Court Chief Justice Myron T. Steele, Delaware Secretary of State Harriet Smith Windsor, Delaware Correction Commissioner Carl C. Danberg, former Delaware House of Representatives member Robert L. Byrd, and New Castle County Executive Chris Coons.

On November 24, 2008, after Biden's election to the vice presidency but before his resignation, outgoing Governor Ruth Ann Minner announced that she would appoint Biden's former chief of staff, a member of the Broadcasting Board of Governors named Ted Kaufman, as Biden's temporary successor. Minner said, "I believe Ted Kaufman meets every test I set for this office. His political views are close to Sen. Biden's, and he has agreed to focus solely on doing the people's work, not seeking re-election." Biden resigned in January 2009; Minner formally appointed Kaufman to the seat shortly thereafter.

== Republican primary ==
=== Candidates ===
- Mike Castle, U.S. Representative from Delaware at-large; former governor and lieutenant governor of Delaware
- Christine O'Donnell, political commentator and perennial candidate

=== Campaign ===
In April 2009, Representative Mike Castle stated, "there's probably a better chance I'll run for the Senate than the House. [But] I said there's a chance I won't run at all." On October 6, 2009, Castle announced that he would in fact run for the Senate seat. After her 2008 loss to Biden, Christine O'Donnell had indicated she would strongly consider running for the seat again in 2010, asking supporters on her website to "save your yard sign!!" On February 12, 2009, O'Donnell had announced her candidacy. She reiterated that she was in the race even after Castle announced his candidacy in October 2009, and formally launched her campaign on March 10, 2010. In her remarks, O'Donnell criticized excessive government spending, said that Castle was the most liberal Republican in the House, and said that the Tea Party movement and grassroots anti-incumbent trends would be in her favor.

When a report from The News Journal in March 2010 detailed O'Donnell's fiscal difficulties, she attributed the problems to misunderstandings and errors, and said, "I think the fact that I have struggled financially is what makes me so sympathetic." Nevertheless, her financial problems became a focal point of establishment Republican attacks against her. A July 2010 Rasmussen Reports poll showed O'Donnell running ahead of Democratic Senate candidate Chris Coons by a margin of 41 to 39 percent in a hypothetical matchup. During this time she picked up the endorsements of the Susan B. Anthony List, the Tea Party Express, which called her a "strong voice for conservative constitutionalist principles", and the Family Research Council.

O'Donnell supporters were heartened by the late August primary victory in Alaska of little-known, Tea Party-backed insurgent Joe Miller over incumbent Republican Senator Lisa Murkowski. The Tea Party Express said it might spend as much as $600,000 backing O'Donnell. The added buzz about her campaign and the possibility that another establishment Republican figure might be defeated by an insurgent brought national attention to the race. The same attention also brought additional scrutiny on her record and financial history, including a contentious interview on WGMD radio. She had claimed that she beat or tied Joe Biden in two of the state's three counties in their 2008 campaign. Later, she admitted this was inaccurate, and that she had lost all three counties.

As September began, the tone of the race grew nastier, with Delaware Republican Party chair Tom Ross saying, "Is Christine O'Donnell actually this unhinged from reality? Or is she simply a liar, whose total lack of respect for Delaware voters leads her to deliberately and repeatedly deny the clear facts surrounding her many personal and professional failures?" Ross also said, "She's not a viable candidate for any office in the state of Delaware. She could not be elected dog catcher." The O'Donnell campaign generated controversy in early September when a political consulting firm hired by O'Donnell released a web video insinuating that her opponent Castle was having a gay affair. O'Donnell quickly distanced herself from the claims, pointing out that the firm in question was no longer working for her campaign, though the manner in which she denied involvement in the rumor led some to suspect that she was intentionally engaging in a whisper campaign by deliberately repeating the rumor while denying it. O'Donnell later appeared on Mark Levin's radio show, where she blasted Castle's "unmanly tactics" during the campaign, saying, "this is not a bake-off, put your man-pants on."

Kristen Murray, O'Donnell's 2008 campaign manager, starred in a Delaware Republican Party-funded robocall in which she accused O'Donnell of misusing campaign funds. Says Murray, "This is her third senate race in five years. As O'Donnell's manager, I found out she was living on campaign donations — using them for rent and personal expenses, while leaving her workers unpaid and piling up thousands in debt. She wasn't concerned about conservative causes. O'Donnell just wanted to make a buck." O'Donnell denied most of what Murray said and stated that she had fired Murray.

With days to go before the primary, O'Donnell was bolstered by an endorsement from former Governor of Alaska and Republican vice presidential nominee Sarah Palin. A few days later, The Weekly Standard broke new details of O'Donnell's 2005 $6.95 million gender discrimination and wrongful termination lawsuit against her former employer, the conservative Intercollegiate Studies Institute.

Castle was considered the favorite to prevail in the general election. Polls that considered a matchup of Castle against Democrat Chris Coons indicated that Castle would defeat Coons by a significant margin. In September, a poll by Public Policy Polling showed Castle leading Coons by a 10-point margin.

However, on September 14, O'Donnell won an upset victory over Castle in the Republican primary. O'Donnell was considered far less electable in a general election than Castle; Politico reported, "The path to a Republican Senate takeover narrowed to the point of vanishing Tuesday night, as marketing consultant Christine O’Donnell upset Rep. Mike Castle in Delaware’s Senate primary and likely dashed the GOP’s hopes of capturing the seat in the process".

=== Results ===
2010 United States Senate election in Delaware Republican primary
- September 14, 2010
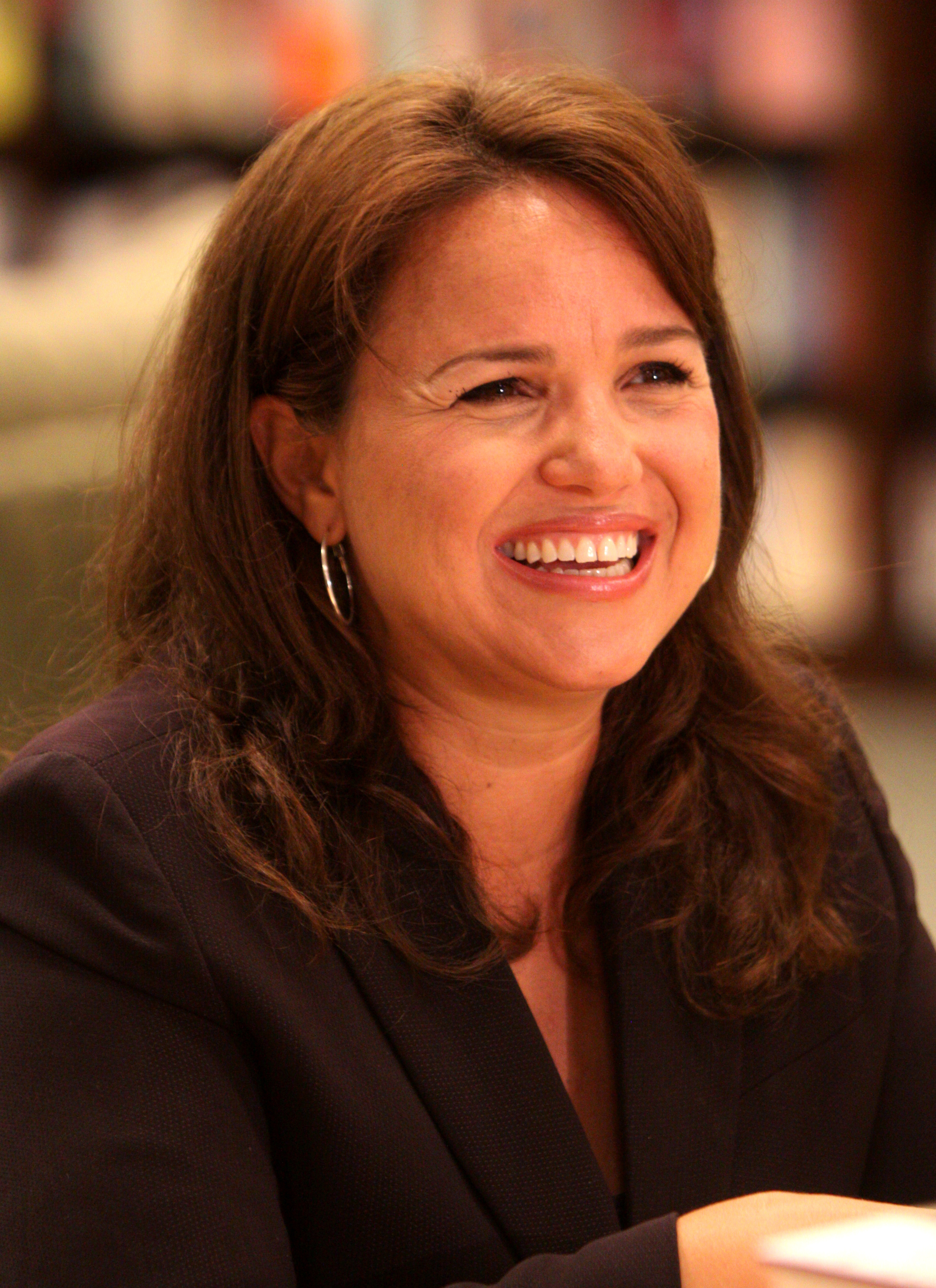

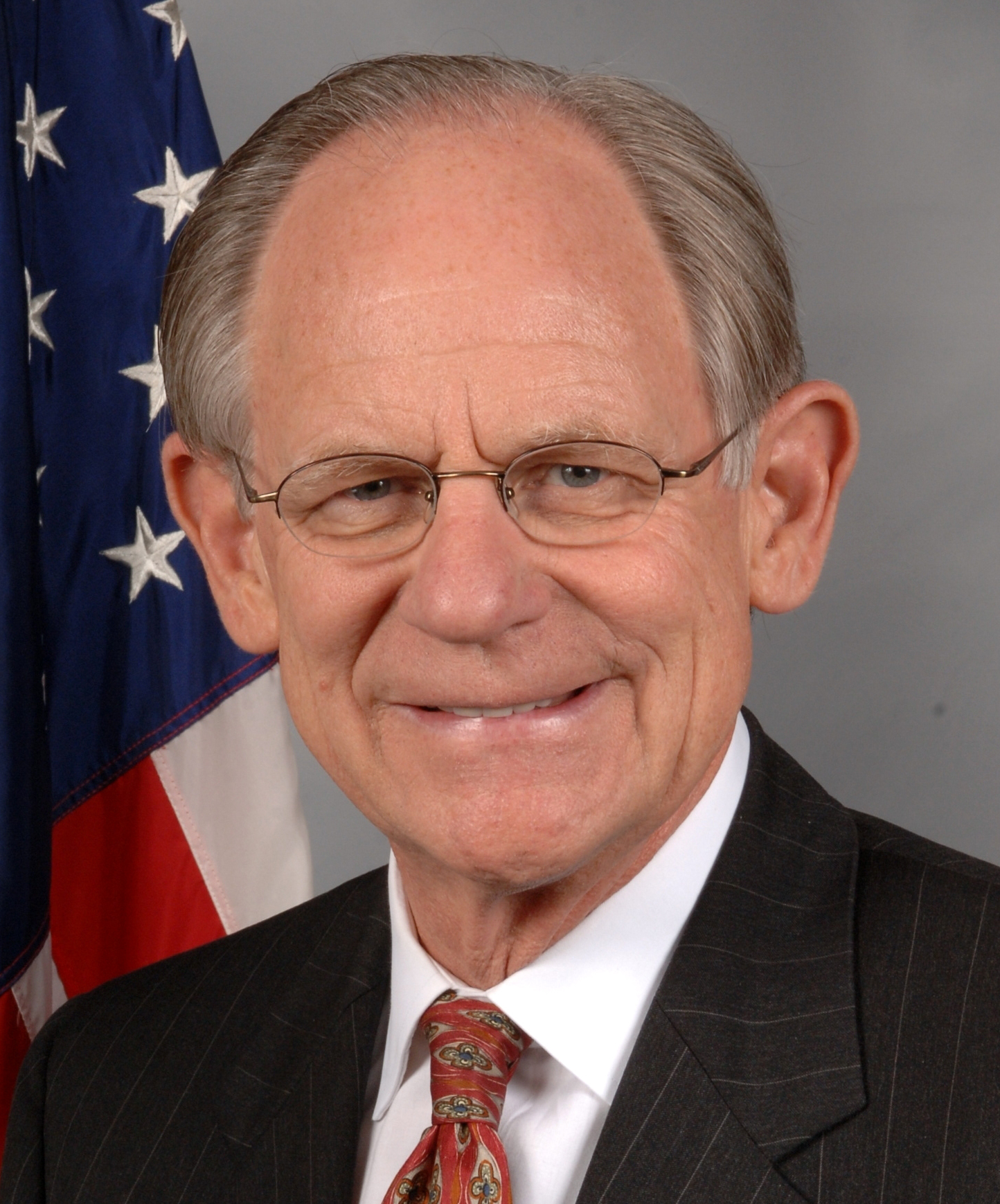
Candidate	Christine O'Donnell	Mike Castle
Popular vote	30,561	27,021
Percentage	53.1%	46.9%
- O'Donnell: 50–60% 60–70% 70–80% Castle: 50–60% 60–70% 70–80% 80–90%

Republican primary results
Party	Candidate	Votes	%
Republican	Christine O'Donnell	30,561	53.07%
Republican	Mike Castle	27,021	46.93%
Total votes		57,582	100.00%

== General election ==
=== Candidates ===
- Chris Coons (D)
- Christine O'Donnell (R)
- Glenn Miller (I)
- James Rash (L)

=== Campaign ===
Incumbent U.S. Senator Ted Kaufman opted not to seek election for the remainder of the term in 2010. Former Lieutenant Governor John Carney and State Attorney General Beau Biden, both Democrats, opted not to seek the Senate seat, either. New Castle County Executive Chris Coons became the Democratic Party nominee by default, as he did not face a primary challenge.

Following her upset victory in the Republican primary, O'Donnell continued to face a split reaction from the leaders in the local, state, and national Republican Party. Castle said he would not support O'Donnell. The National Republican Senatorial Committee similarly released a statement almost immediately following O'Donnell's primary win, stating that they would not spend money to support her or her campaign. However, Texas Senator John Cornyn, chairman of the NRSC, released a statement later stating he did not know where the release from within his organization originated. He then offered the maximum $42,000 donation to her campaign; Cornyn acknowledged, however, that he was not sure if she could win. Former Governor of Massachusetts and future 2012 presidential nominee Mitt Romney also contributed to O'Donnell's general election funds. However, former White House adviser and Republican strategist Karl Rove said following O'Donnell's primary victory, "This is not a race we're going to be able to win."

The morning following the primary, Public Policy Polling released a tweet indicating that their polling found that primary voters who voted for Mike Castle supported Coons, the Democratic opponent, over O'Donnell 44 percent to 28 percent in a general election. An October 16 report by CNN indicated that Coons was leading O'Donnell by double digits in polls.

In September 2010, comedian and television host Bill Maher aired a 1999 clip of O'Donnell in which O'Donnell said, "I dabbled into witchcraft — I never joined a coven. ... I hung around people who were doing these things... We went to a movie and then had a little midnight picnic on a satanic altar. And I didn't know it." Her admission received widespread media coverage, and O'Donnell explained that she had been referring to high school experiences. During her campaign for the general election, O'Donnell followed up with a TV advertisement which featured her declaring, "I'm not a witch." This ad inspired many video parodies, most famously by comedian Kristen Wiig on Saturday Night Live.

An October 19, 2010, debate between Coons and O'Donnell at Widener University School of Law featured an exchange about separation of church and state in the United States and whether it is explicitly in the U.S. constitution. O'Donnell said it was not; afterward her campaign manager said, "Christine O'Donnell was not questioning the concept of separation of church and state as subsequently established by the courts. She simply made the point that the phrase appears nowhere in the Constitution." (That phrase was "substantively" read into the First Amendment in the U.S. Supreme Court case Engel v. Vitale in 1962 and does not appear verbatim in the Constitution.)

On election day, Coons defeated O'Donnell by nearly 17 percentage points.

=== Fundraising ===
Candidate (Party)	Receipts	Disbursements	Cash On Hand	Debt	Date
Chris Coons (D)	$4,207,479	$3,479,819	$727,660	$250,000	through 11/22/10
Christine O'Donnell (R)	$7,340,167	$6,406,246	$924,745	$2,692	through 11/22/10
Source: Federal Election Commission

=== Predictions ===
Source	Ranking	As of
Cook Political Report	Likely D	October 30, 2010
Rothenberg	Likely D	October 28, 2010
RealClearPolitics	Likely D	October 30, 2010
Sabato's Crystal Ball	Likely D	October 28, 2010
CQ Politics	Likely D	October 30, 2010
Rasmussen Reports	Safe D	October 27, 2010

=== Polling ===
Poll source	Date(s) administered	Sample size	Margin of error	Chris Coons (D)	Christine O'Donnell (R)	Glenn Miller (I)	Other	Undecided	Refused
Research 2000	February 22–24, 2010	600	± 4.0%	47%	31%	––	22%	––	
Rasmussen Reports	July 14, 2010	500	± 4.5%	39%	41%	––	7%	12%	
Rasmussen Reports	August 5, 2010	500	± 4.5%	46%	36%	––	10%	8%	
Public Policy Polling	August 7–8, 2010	600	± 4.0%	44%	37%	––	––	19%	
Rasmussen Reports	September 2, 2010	500	± 4.5%	47%	36%	––	8%	9%	
Public Policy Polling	September 11–12, 2010	958	± 3.2%	50%	34%	––	––	16%	
Rasmussen Reports	September 16, 2010	500	± 4.5%	53%	42%	––	1%	4%	
CNN	September 17–21, 2010	703	± 3.5%	55%	39%	––	––	––	
Rasmussen Reports	September 26, 2010	500	± 4.5%	49%	40%	5%	0%	5%	
Fairleigh Dickinson University's Public Mind	September 27 – October 3, 2010	801	± 3.5%	53%	36%	––	––	8%	3%
FOX News/Pulse Opinion Research	October 9, 2010	1,000	± 3.0%	54%	38%	––	3%	5%	
Magellan	October 10, 2010	928	± 3.3%	54%	36%	––	3%	7%	
Monmouth	October 8–11, 2010	790	± 3.5%	57%	38%	––	5%	––	
Survey USA/University of Delaware	October 11–12, 2010	2,355	± 2.1%	54%	33%	––	5%	9%	
Rasmussen Reports	October 14, 2010	500	± 4.5%	51%	40%	––	5%	4%	
Fairleigh Dickinson University	October 20–26, 2010	797	± 3.5%	57%	36%	––	––	––	
Monmouth University	October 25–27, 2010	1,171	± 2.9%	51%	41%	––	4%	4%	

Hypothetical polling

Poll source	Date(s) administered	Sample size	Margin of error	Mike Castle (R)	Chris Coons (D)	Other	Undecided
Research 2000	October 12–14, 2009	600	± 4.0%	51%	39%	––	10%
Rasmussen Reports	January 25, 2010	500	± 4.5%	56%	27%	5%	13%
Rasmussen Reports	February 22, 2010	500	± 4.5%	53%	32%	8%	8%
Research 2000	February 22–24, 2010	600	± 4.0%	53%	35%	––	12%
Rasmussen Reports	April 29, 2010	500	± 4.5%	55%	32%	7%	7%
Rasmussen Reports	July 14, 2010	500	± 4.5%	47%	36%	6%	11%
Rasmussen Reports	August 5, 2010	500	± 4.5%	49%	37%	5%	9%
Public Policy Polling	August 7–8, 2010	600	± 4.0%	48%	35%	––	17%
Rasmussen Reports	September 2, 2010	500	± 4.5%	48%	37%	6%	9%
Public Policy Polling	September 11–12, 2010	958	± 3.2%	45%	35%	––	20%

=== Results ===
United States Senate special election in Delaware, 2010
Party	Candidate	Votes	%	±%
Democratic	Chris Coons	174,012	56.61%	−8.07%
Republican	Christine O'Donnell	123,053	40.03%	+4.72%
Independent Party	Glenn Miller	8,201	2.67%	N/A
Libertarian	James Rash	2,101	0.69%	N/A
Total votes		307,367	100.0%	
Democratic hold				

==== By county ====
County	Chris Coons Democratic		Christine O'Donnell Republican		All Others	
County	#	%	#	%	#	%
Kent	22,315	45.12	25,059	50.66	425	0.86
New Castle	123,678	66.12	57,649	30.82	1,271	0.68
Sussex	28,019	39.53	40,345	56.92	2,520	3.55
Totals	174,012	56.61	123,053	40.03	4,216	1.69

Counties that flipped from Democratic to Republican

- Kent (largest city: Dover)
- Sussex (largest city: Seaford)

== Aftermath ==
After O'Donnell's poor performance, there was considerable discussion within Republican circles regarding whether the party had lost a sure Senate seat by nominating her instead of Castle. Party pragmatists said that this was the case, pointing to other races in Nevada and Colorado where Tea Party-favored candidates had lost races against Democratic rivals. For her own part, O'Donnell criticized divisions within the Delaware Republican Party following her primary win and said the consequent lack of support had led to her defeat.
