= Onah (Judaism) =

Term in Jewish law

Onah (Hebrew:עוֹנָה) is a Mitzvah that obliges the husband to be attentive and responsive to his wife's emotional and intimate needs.

In rabbinic Hebrew, the word literally means "due season, period, stage". In the word's only Biblical appearance (Exodus 21:10), opinions are divided whether it means "time/season" or else "dwelling together".

== The onah commandment ==
The term "mitzvat onah" (a mitzvah performed at a set time period) refers to a husband's conjugal obligations toward his wife and is also used as a halachic euphemism for marital relations.

The Biblical source for the command is Exodus 21:10, which states that if a man takes a second wife in addition to the woman he has taken as a first wife, he may not withhold from either food, clothing or diminish the frequency with which he cohabits with the first wife. If the former wife has such rights, then it follows that all wives have at least the same degree of rights. The frequency of cohabitation (ענתה) has been translated as providing the view shelter, along with the guaranteed food and clothing. Based upon the Gemara (Ketubot 47b), Rashi interprets this word as meaning 'Marital duty,' which can be inferred as referring to marital intercourse being a nuptial requirement.

According to the Mishnah, the frequency at which a husband must have sex with his wife (if she desires it) depends on the husband's profession: for men of independence, every day; for laborers, twice a week; for donkey-drivers, once a week; for camel-drivers, once in thirty days; for sailors, once in six months.

The commandment applies even if a wife is unable to become pregnant (e.g. infertile, old, or currently pregnant or nursing).

R. Yaakov Emden: One should ease his wife's mind and make her happy, prepare her and nurture her with words that make her happy so that she feels passionate towards him (which will be apparent in her breathing and eyes).

== In relation to niddah ==
In the context of the laws of niddah, the word onah usually refers to a day or a night. Each 24-hour day thus consists of two onot (plural for onah). The daytime onah begins at sunrise and ends at sunset. The night-time onah lasts from sunset until sunrise.

Marital relations are forbidden during one of these 12-hour periods if a woman anticipates her menstrual cycle beginning in such a period. This is called an "onat perishah" (time period of separation).

The term onah can also refer to the length of the menstrual cycle. Halachically, (according to Jewish law) one assumes that the "onah beinonit" (or average interval), is thirty days long.
