= Banus =

Banus (or Bano) was a teacher of Titus Flavius Josephus, a first-century Romano-Jewish scholar, historian and hagiographer.

Josephus wrote in his work Vita that Banus "lived in the desert, used no other clothing than grew upon trees, had no other food than what grew of its own accord, and bathed himself in cold water frequently, both by night and by day, in order to preserve his chastity. I imitated him in those things, and continued with him three years." Josephus then returned to the city at the age of nineteen and began to live according to the rules of the Pharisees.

William Whiston suggests, in a footnote in his translation of the works of Josephus, that Banus may have been a disciple of John the Baptist and may have influenced Josephus to have a favourable opinion of Jesus.

Chajes connects the name "Banus" with the Talmudic "Bannaah".
