= 2008 United States Senate election in Delaware =

- November 4, 2008
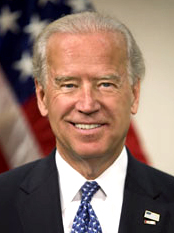

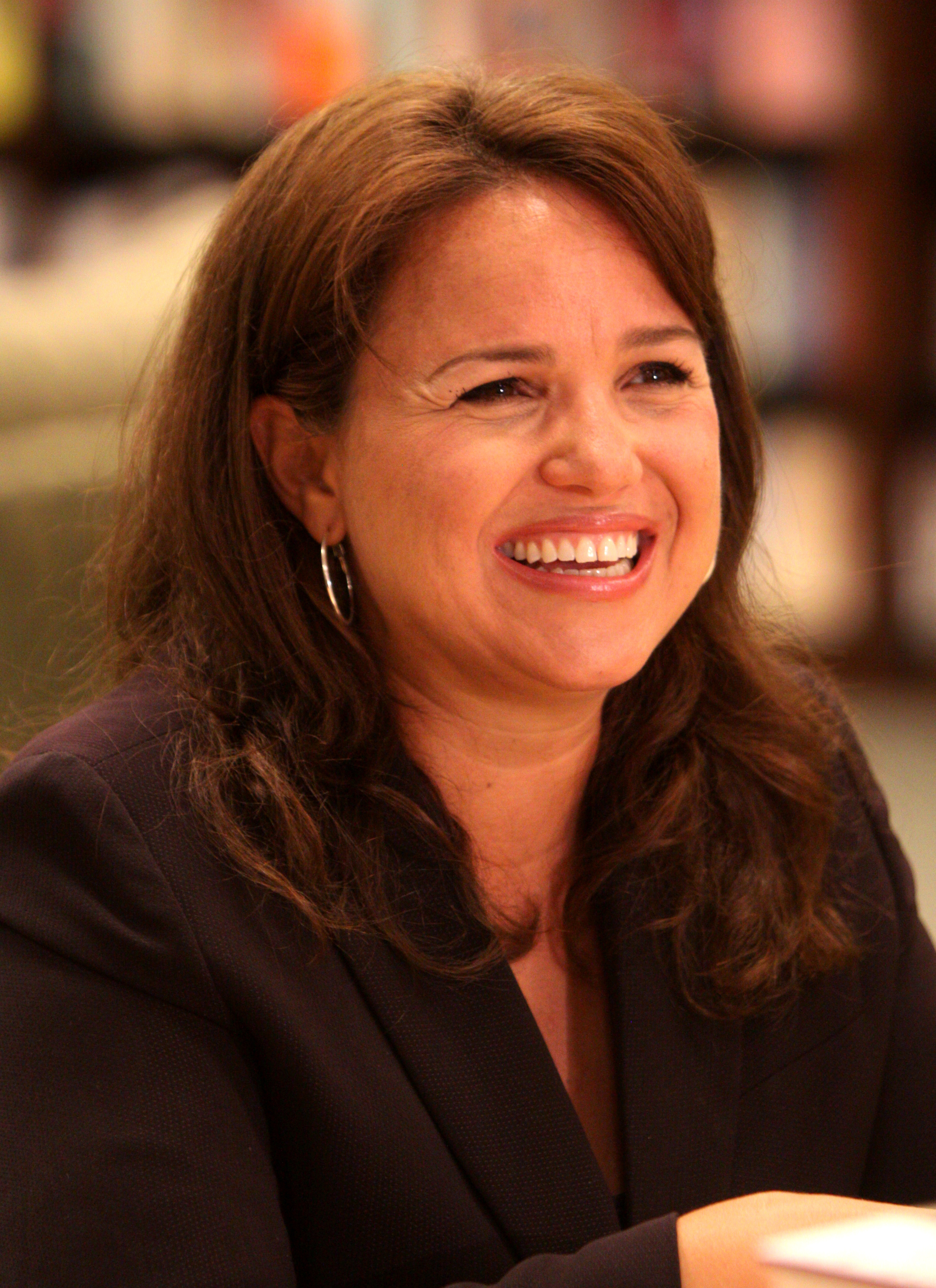
Nominee	Joe Biden	Christine O'Donnell
Party	Democratic	Republican
Popular vote	257,539	140,595
Percentage	64.69%	35.31%
- Biden: 50–60% 60–70% 70–80% 80–90% >90% O'Donnell: 50–60%
U.S. senator before election
Joe Biden
Democratic
Elected U.S. senator
Joe Biden
Democratic

The 2008 United States Senate election in Delaware was held on November 4, 2008, to elect a member of the United States Senate to represent the state of Delaware. Democratic incumbent Joe Biden—also the party's vice presidential nominee in the concurrent presidential election—won re-election to a seventh term, defeating Republican media consultant Christine O'Donnell. As of 2026, Biden is one of four vice presidential nominees who simultaneously ran on the presidential ticket and for re-election to their U.S. Senate seats. (Note: The other three vice presidential nominees who ran for re-election to their U.S. Senate seats in the same cycle were Lyndon B. Johnson in 1960, Lloyd Bentsen in 1988, and Joe Lieberman in 2000.) He was also elected vice president alongside Democratic presidential nominee Barack Obama.

The election was O'Donnell's second run for the Senate after a failed write-in campaign in 2006. Biden primarily focused on his vice presidential run, which O'Donnell criticized him for; he heavily outspent her in Delaware, and she ended her campaign in debt. During the 2010 cycle, it was discovered that O'Donnell broke campaign finance regulations by spending donations on personal expenses.

Shortly after being sworn in, Biden resigned from the Senate to assume the vice presidency, and long-time Biden advisor Ted Kaufman was appointed to fill the vacancy. A special election was held in 2010, where O'Donnell again ran unsuccessfully.

== Background ==
Biden had first been elected to the Senate in 1972. He won his sixth term in 2002, defeating Republican candidate Raymond Clatworthy. Delaware is considered a "blue state", having last voted for a Republican presidential candidate in 1988. By 2008, there were only two Republicans who held statewide office.

== Candidates and primaries ==
- Joe Biden (Democrat), incumbent senator since 1973
- Christine O'Donnell (Republican), media consultant, political analyst and write-in candidate in 2006

In January 2008, following a poor performance in the Iowa caucus, Biden ended his 2008 presidential bid to instead focus on running for a seventh term in the United States Senate. He was unopposed within his party. On August 23, the Democratic Party's presidential nominee, Illinois senator Barack Obama, announced that he had selected Biden to serve as his running mate in the presidential election. Under Delaware law, Biden could run simultaneously for both his Senate seat and the vice presidency, which he decided to do.

O'Donnell had previously run in for Delaware's Class One Senate seat in 2006. After losing the Republican primary to Jan C. Ting, she ran in the general election as a write-in candidate. She lost, having received less than five percent of the vote. The primary election was held on September 9, 2008. Both candidates ran unopposed.

== General election ==
=== Campaign ===
Biden largely ignored the election in favor of Obama's presidential run. O'Donnell tried to make an issue of the dual campaigns, claiming that doing so was evidence that serving his constituents was not important to him, as well as criticizing his unwillingness to participate in debates and candidate forums. Politico's Daniel Libit, writing about O'Donnell, said, "nowhere else in America is a challenger wanting her incumbent opponent to campaign harder against her." O'Donnell received the endorsements of astronaut Buzz Aldrin, Mississippi governor Haley Barbour, and activist David Horowitz.

Biden put up very few campaign advertisements; nevertheless, he heavily outspent O'Donnell and her campaign failed to gain traction. She ended her campaign with thousands of dollars in debt. Kristin Murray briefly served as the campaign manager for O'Donnell, later saying she left the campaign willingly because of O'Donnell's financial situation; O'Donnell said she was fired. During O'Donnell's 2010 campaign for the seat, Murray said that O'Donnell was misusing her campaign donations and using the money to pay her rent and other "personal expenses".

=== Predictions ===
Source	Ranking	As of
Cook Political Report	Solid D	October 23, 2008
Rothenberg Political Report	Safe D	November 2, 2008
Sabato's Crystal Ball	Solid D	November 4, 2008

=== Fundraising ===
Campaign finance reports as of December 31, 2008
Candidate	Raised	Spent	Cash on hand
Joe Biden (D)	$7,981,036	$8,217,880	$152,376
Christine O'Donnell (R)	$116,471	$115,058	$456
Source: Federal Election Commission

=== Polling ===
Poll source	Date(s) administered	Sample size (Note: Key: A – all adults RV – registered voters LV – likely voters V – unclear)	Margin of error	Joe Biden (D)	Christine O'Donnell (R)	Other	Undecided
SurveyUSA (Note: Poll sponsored by WCAU-TV Philadelphia)	October 27–28, 2008	657 (LV)	± 3.7%	66%	32%	—	2%
West Chester University Polling	October 6–8, 2008	429 (LV)	± 4.8%	65%	29%	—	6%
SurveyUSA	September 22–23, 2008	703 (LV)	± 3.6%	64%	32%	—	4%
Fairleigh Dickinson University	September 17–21, 2008	601 (LV)	± 4.0%	69%	25%	1%	5%

== Results ==
The election was held on November 4, 2008. Only minutes after the polls closed, the race was called for Biden. He was re-elected in a landslide victory against O'Donnell, securing his largest margin of victory and improving on his 2002 performance by around 6.5%. He received around two thousand more votes than Obama did in the presidential election. Biden's victory was a part of a national "blue wave" in the 2008 election cycle.

2008 United States Senate election in Delaware
Party	Candidate	Votes	%	±%
Democratic	Joe Biden (incumbent)	257,539	64.69	+6.47
Republican	Christine O'Donnell	140,595	35.31	−5.49
Majority		116,944	29.38	6.47
Total votes		398,134	100.00	N/A
Democratic hold				

=== By county ===
Biden won all three counties, including Kent County, which he lost in 2002. This marked the last time he won all three counties in a general election. In his vice presidential runs in 2008 and 2012, and in his successful presidential run in 2020, Sussex County voted for the Republican candidates.

Biden's best performance was in New Castle County, where he won around 72 percent of the vote to O'Donnell's 28 percent. O'Donnell's best performance was in Sussex County, where she received 49.84% of the vote to Biden's 50.16%, his weakest performance. New Castle County had the highest number of votes cast with 246,561, followed by Sussex County with 86,790.

County	Joe Biden Democratic		Christine O'Donnell Republican		Margin		Total
County	#	%	#	%	#	%	Total
Kent	37,074	56.99%	27,981	43.01%	9,093	13.98%	65,055
New Castle	177,070	71.82%	69,491	28.18%	107,579	43.64%	246,561
Sussex	43,395	50.16%	43,123	49.84%	272	0.32%	86,518
Totals	257,539	64.69%	140,595	35.31%	116,944	29.38%	398,134

Counties that flipped from Republican to Democratic

- Kent (largest city: Dover)

== Aftermath ==
A few weeks after the election, The News Journal published an opinion piece by Greg Gober on Delaware's election laws. Gober found the result unfair and undemocratic as Biden's replacement was not voted on. He also criticized Biden himself for his dual campaigns. Biden took the oath of office in the Senate chamber with his fellow senators-elect on January 3, 2009, but resigned his seat on January 15, 2009, and assumed the vice presidency five days later.

Outgoing Delaware governor Ruth Ann Minner appointed Ted Kaufman, a Democrat and longtime Biden advisor, to fill the vacant seat pending a 2010 special election, where Kaufman stated he had no plans to run. O'Donnell once again ran unsuccessfully for the seat, defeating congressman Mike Castle in the Republican primary in an upset but losing the general election to Democrat Chris Coons. In 2015, she was sued by the Federal Election Commission (FEC) for misuse of campaign funds and was found guilty a year later.

== Notes ==
Partisan and media clients
