= 2008 Democratic Party vice presidential candidate selection =

2008 Democratic vice presidential nomination
- August 21, 2008
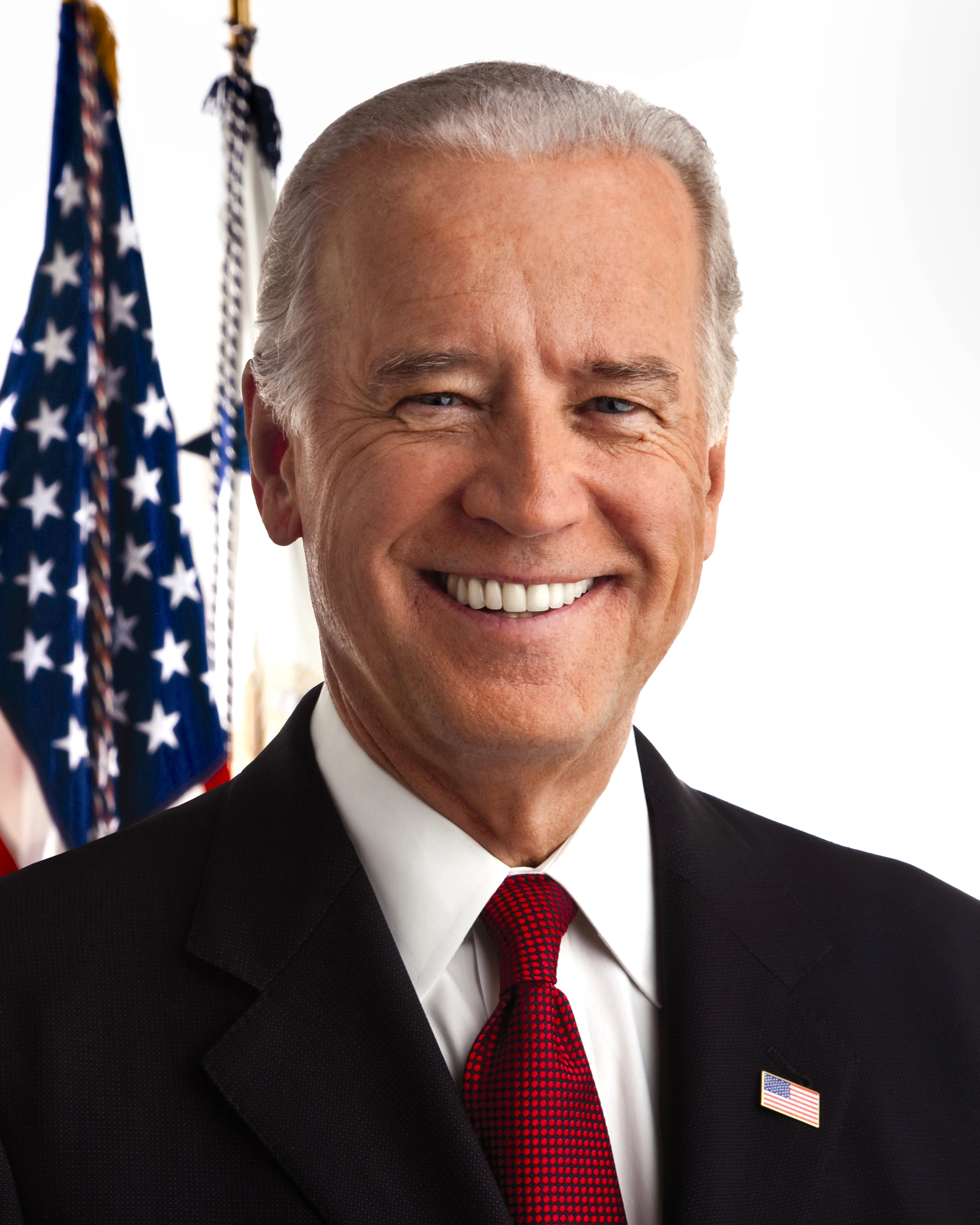
Nominee	Joe Biden
Home state	Delaware
Previous Vice Presidential nominee
John Edwards
Vice Presidential nominee
Joe Biden

This article lists potential candidates for the Democratic nomination for Vice President of the United States in the 2008 presidential election. After Illinois Junior Senator Barack Obama became the Democratic Party's presumptive presidential nominee on June 3, 2008, Obama formed a small committee, made up of James A. Johnson (who stepped down after one week), Eric Holder and Caroline Kennedy, to help him select a running mate. Veteran Democratic lawyer and advisor James "Jim" Hamilton, of the firm Morgan, Lewis & Bockius, later replaced Johnson in vetting candidates.

Obama strongly considered Senator Evan Bayh and governors Tim Kaine and Kathleen Sebelius, but Obama ultimately decided to select Delaware Senior Senator Joe Biden as his running mate. Obama would later name Sebelius as his Secretary of Health and Human Services, while Kaine would ultimately become Hillary Clinton's running mate in 2016. The Obama–Biden ticket would go on to defeat the Republican tickets of McCain–Palin in 2008 and Romney–Ryan in 2012. Coincidental to the presidential election, Biden was re-elected to a seventh term as senator from Delaware but later resigned after being elected Vice President.

In 2020, Biden would be elected president in his own right, defeating incumbent Republican President Donald Trump.

== Shortlist ==
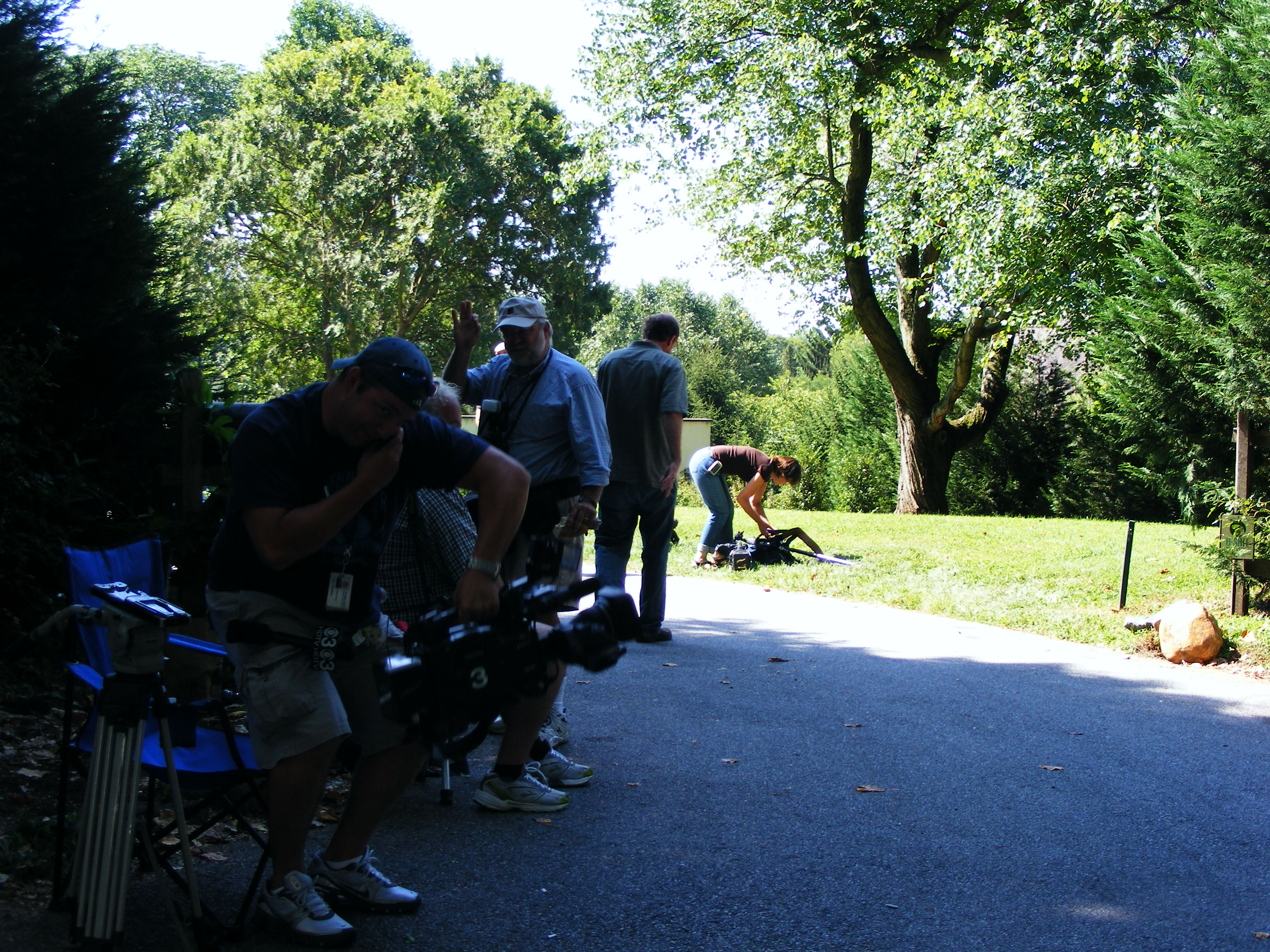
Media near where Joe Biden was residing during speculation that he may be the Democratic nominee for vice president

According to contemporaneous news sources, the following people were thought to be on Senator Obama's short list for Vice President:

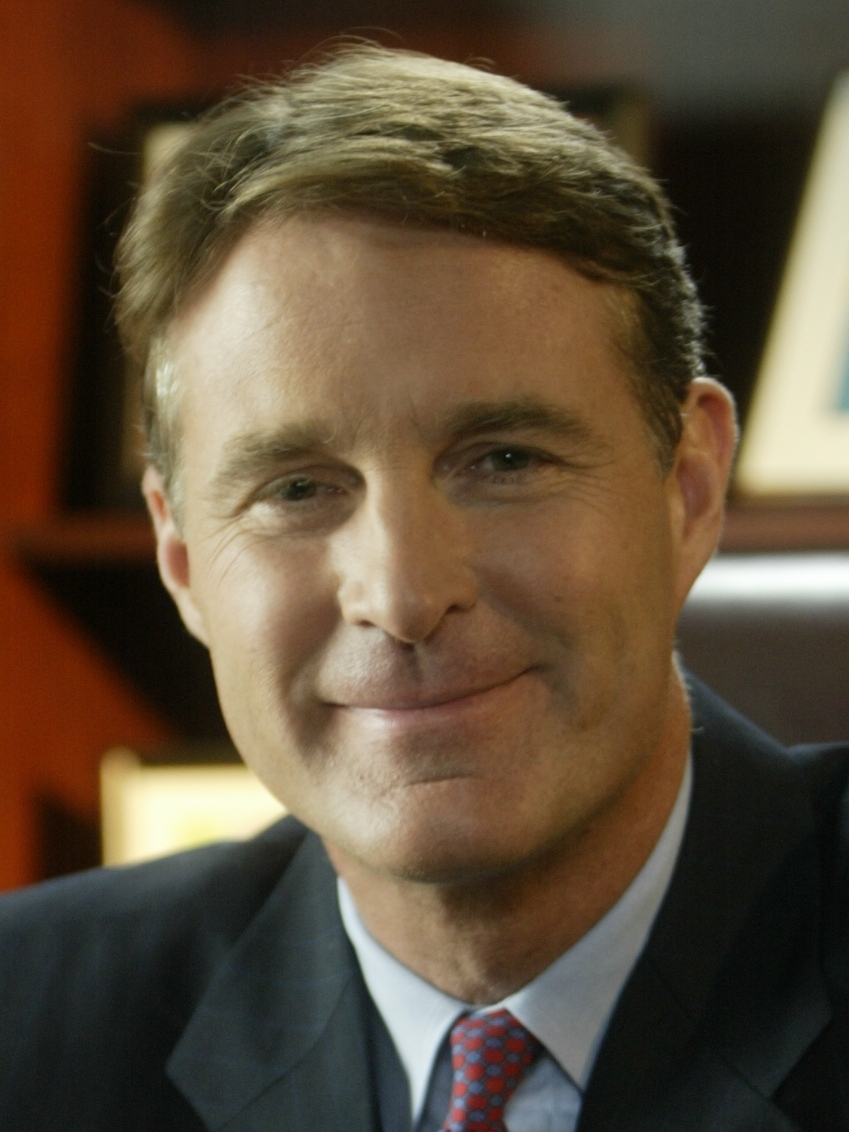
Senator
Evan Bayh
from Indiana
(1999–2011)

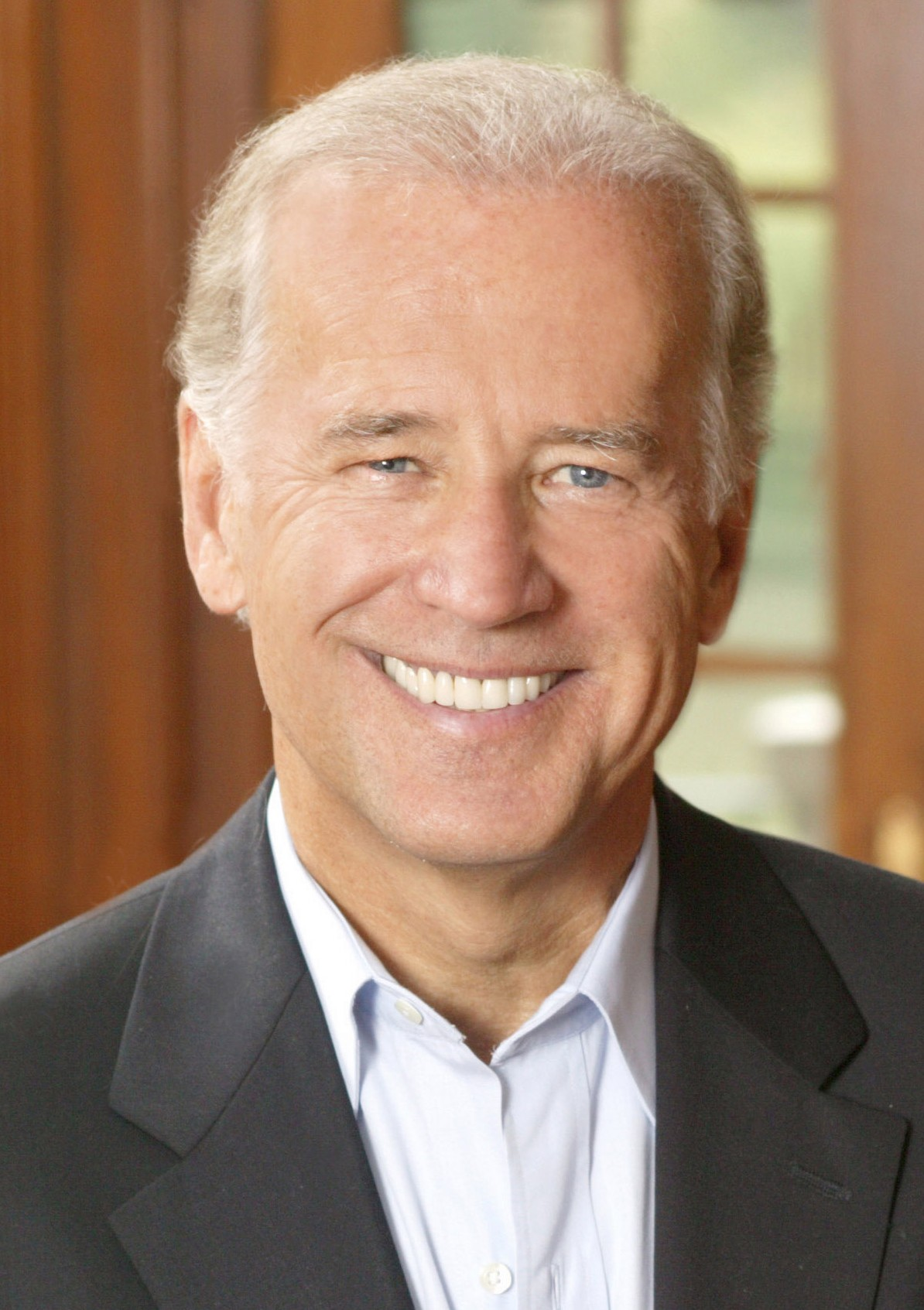
Senator and 1988/2008 presidential candidate
Joe Biden
from Delaware
(1973–2009)

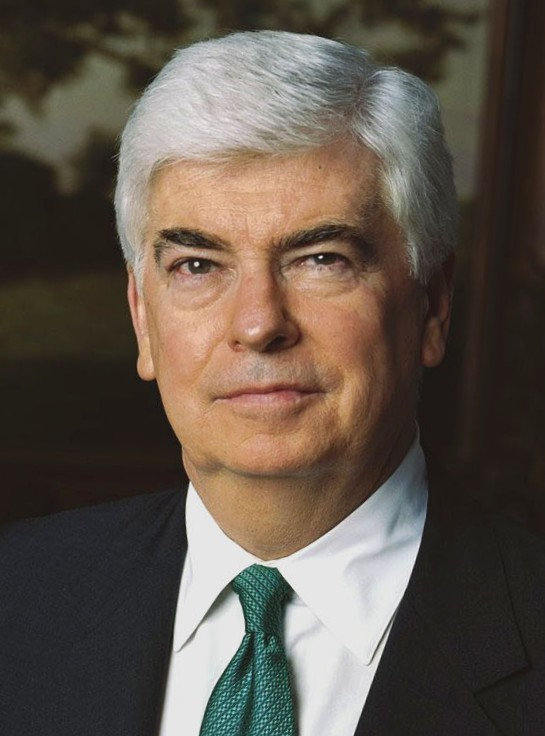
Senator and 2008 presidential candidate
Chris Dodd
from Connecticut
(1981–2011)

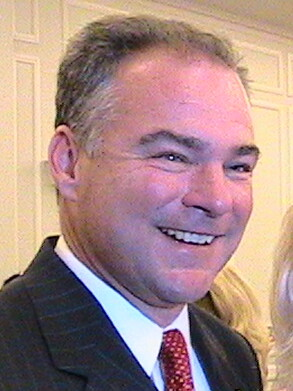
Governor
Tim Kaine
of Virginia
(2006–2010)

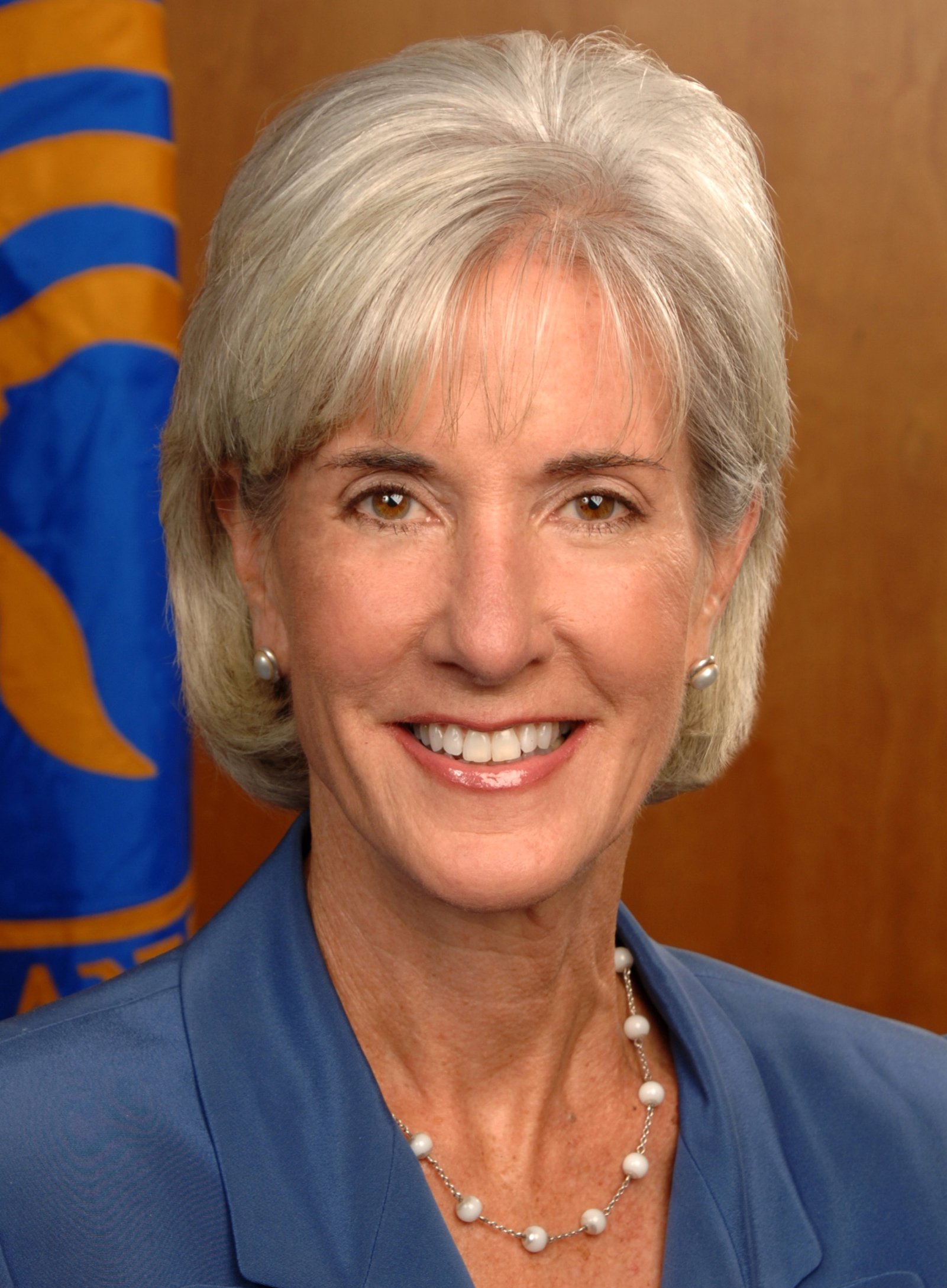
Governor
Kathleen Sebelius
of Kansas
(2003–2009)

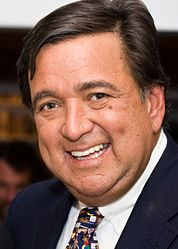
Governor and 2008 presidential candidate
Bill Richardson
of New Mexico
(2003–2011)

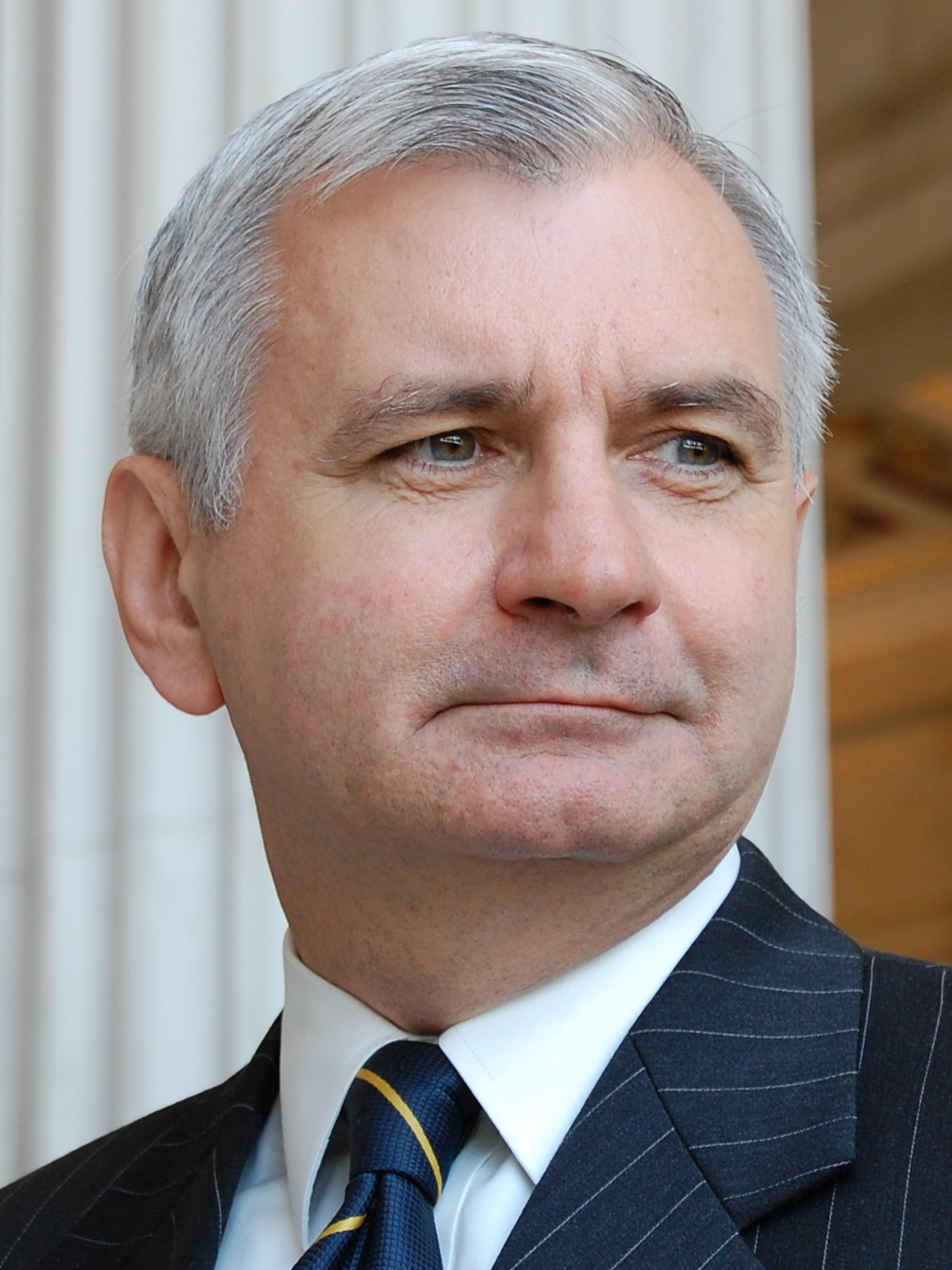
Senator
Jack Reed
from Rhode Island
(1997–present)

== Final days and announcement ==
In the final days leading up to the Democratic National Convention, four individuals were left on Obama's final list for Vice President: Joe Biden, Evan Bayh, Tim Kaine, and Kathleen Sebelius.

On August 22, the eve of Obama's scheduled unveiling of his running mate, NBC News reported that Bayh and Kaine had been informed that they were not chosen. Last minute controversy emerged as it was learned that Senator Hillary Clinton was never vetted for the position, when it was earlier thought that Sen. Barack Obama would consider her as he previously stated in various private and public reports. This led to several questions as to whether Clinton supporters would feel betrayed and would defuse the intensity in "dream ticket" scenarios.

That night, ABC News reported that the U.S. Secret Service had assumed protection of Biden, which was seen as a sign that he had been chosen as Obama's running mate. Just hours later, the Associated Press broke the news that Democratic Party officials had confided that Obama had in fact selected Biden as the vice-presidential nominee.

Obama's campaign manager David Plouffe later wrote in his book The Audacity to Win, which was published in November 2009, that Bayh had been a "coin toss" away from becoming Obama's running mate. Plouffe and David Axelrod had interviewed the finalists and Plouffe said that Bayh's answers were "substantively close to perfect, if cautiously so." He recalled that at the time of the interview he thought to himself, "there's no way this guy will color outside the lines... Bayh's up side and down side are probably the closest spread of the three", compared to Biden, who could "reach higher heights but could cause us real pain." As Obama approached a decision, he told Plouffe "it's a coin toss now between Bayh and Biden, but Kaine is still a distinct possibility." On August 17, Obama told Axelrod simply, "I've decided. It's Biden." It was later reported that Obama told Kaine, in breaking the news to him, "You are the pick of my heart, but Joe [Biden] is the pick of my head".

In 2020, Obama wrote in his memoir A Promised Land, a slightly different account of the selection, not mentioning Bayh and stating that he had ultimately narrowed down the choice for his running mate to two individuals – Kaine and Biden. He stated "At the time, I was much closer to Tim". However, Obama recalled that he and his advisers Axelrod and Plouffe wondered if voters would accept a ticket of "two relatively young, inexperienced, and liberal civil rights attorneys" and ultimately Obama felt the contrast between him and Biden was a strength, and that Biden being older than Obama would reassure those voters who were concerned that Obama was too young to be president. Kaine would later be selected by Hillary Clinton in her 2016 presidential campaign, losing to businessman Donald Trump and Indiana governor Mike Pence.

On August 23, 2008, via text message, the Obama campaign announced that the then-presumptive Democratic presidential nominee chose Senator Joe Biden as his vice-presidential running mate.

The selection was well received by both the public and by political analysts, who largely agreed that Biden's lengthy Senate career and foreign policy experience complemented Obama's youth.

== Media speculation on possible candidates ==
=== Members of Congress ===
Senator and 2008 presidential candidate
Hillary Clinton
from New York
(2001–2009)

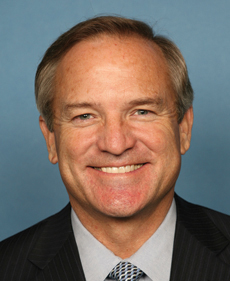
Representative
Chet Edwards
from Texas
(1991–2011)

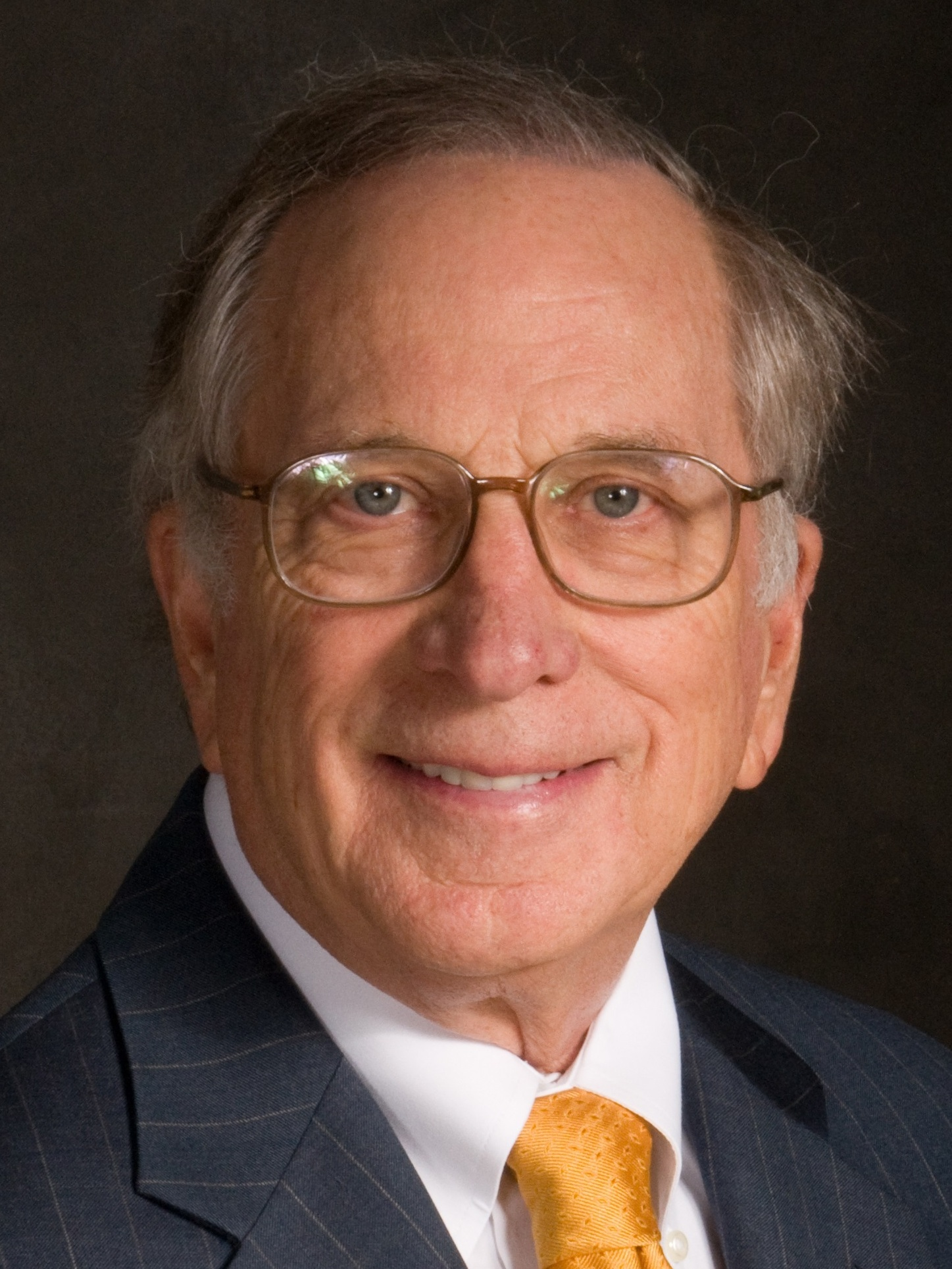
Senator
Sam Nunn
from Georgia
(1972–1997)

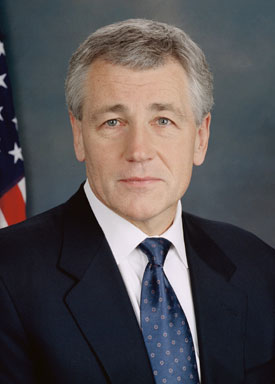
Republican Senator
Chuck Hagel
from Nebraska
(1997–2009)

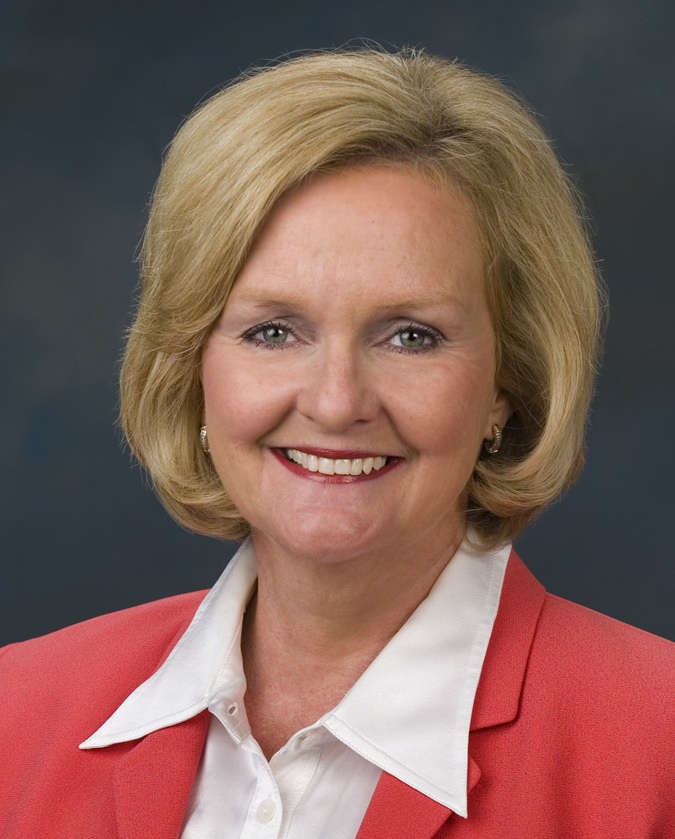
Senator
Claire McCaskill
from Missouri
(2007–2019)

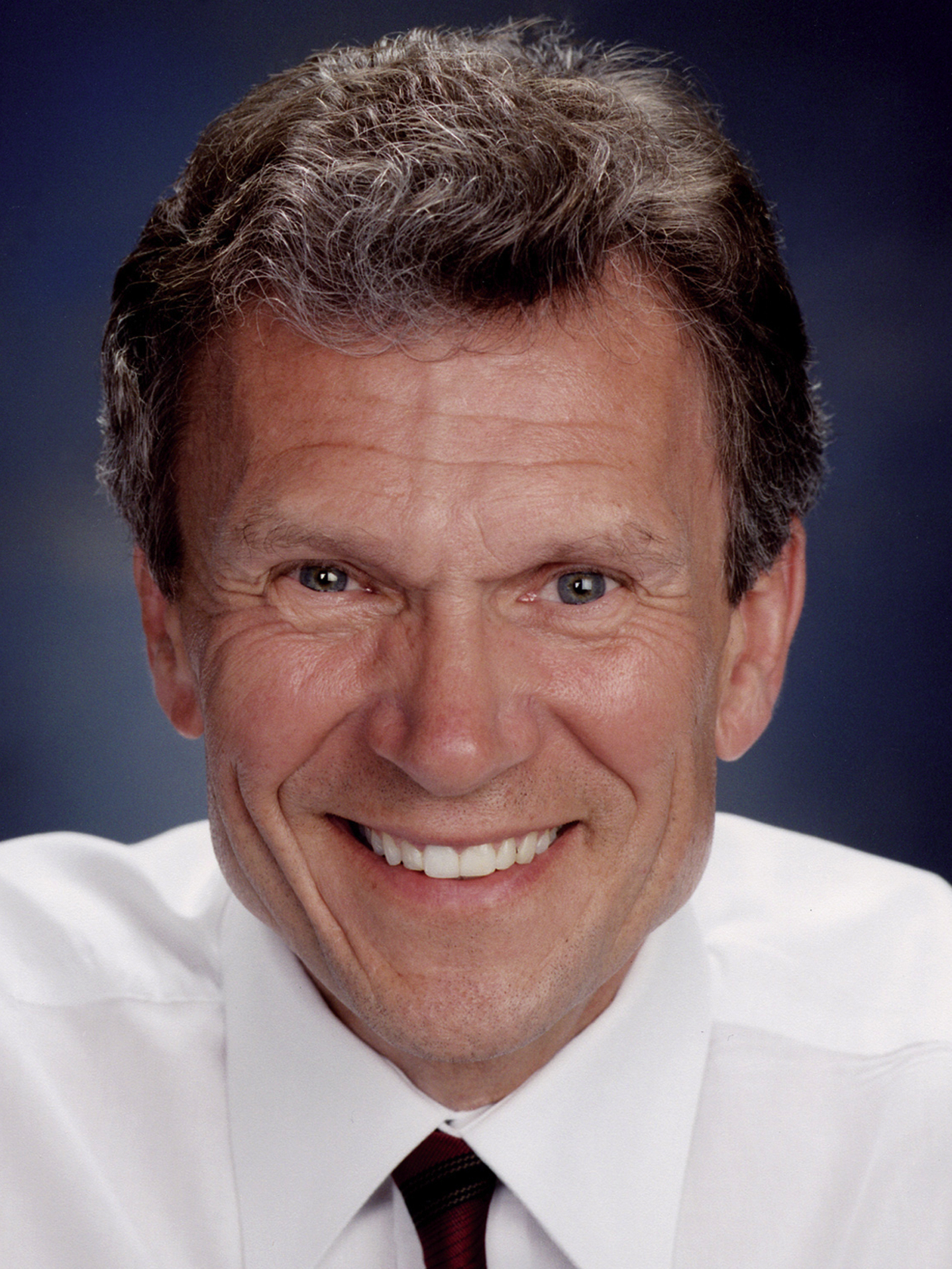
Former Senator
Tom Daschle
from South Dakota
(1987–2005)

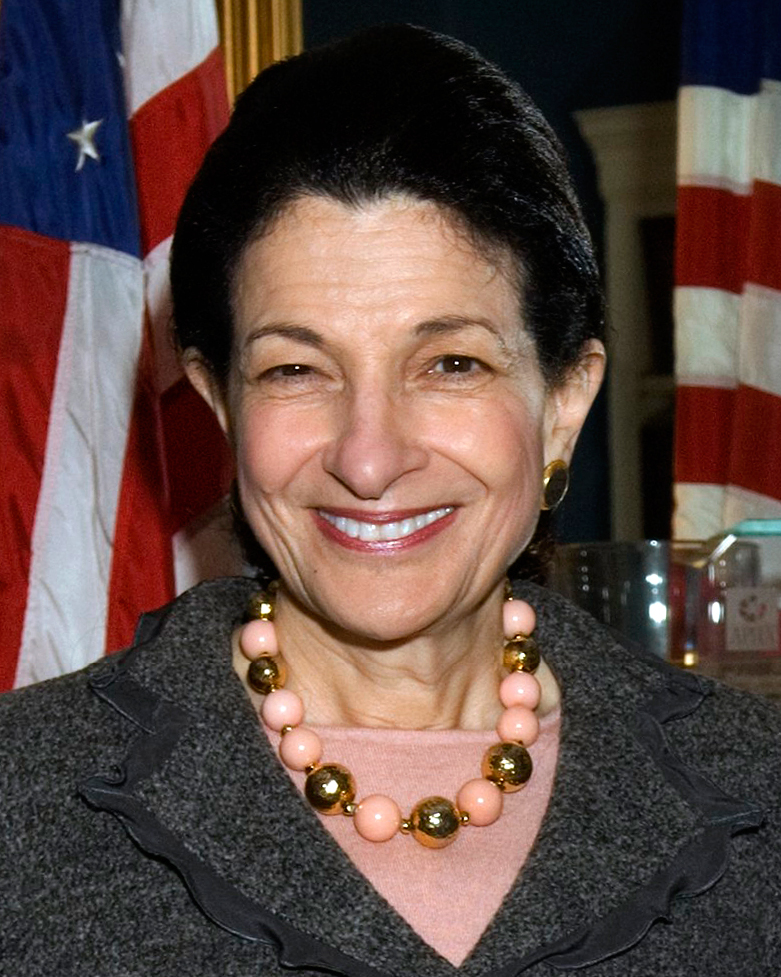
Republican Senator
Olympia Snowe
from Maine
(1995–2013)

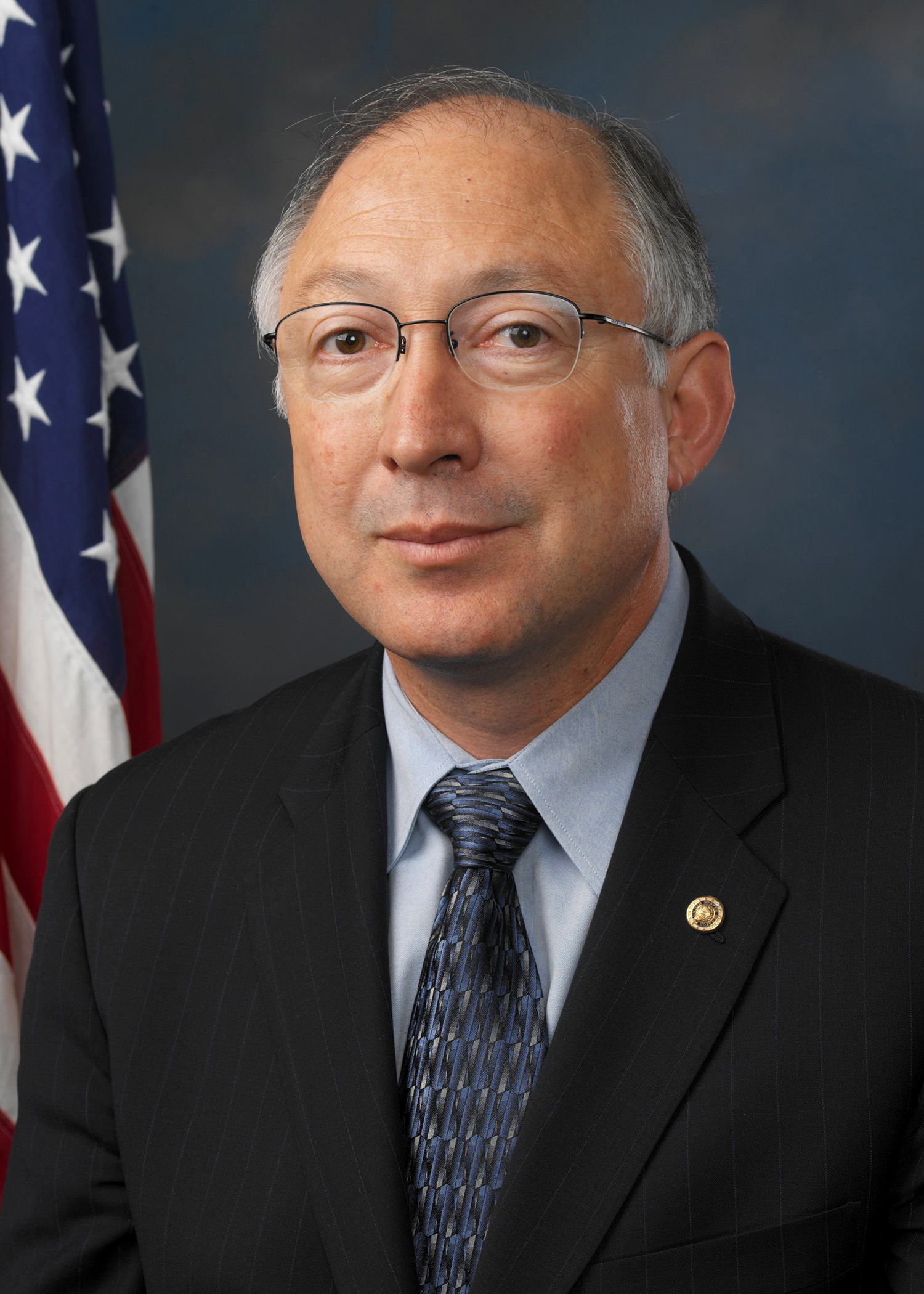
Senator
Ken Salazar
from Colorado
(2005–2009)

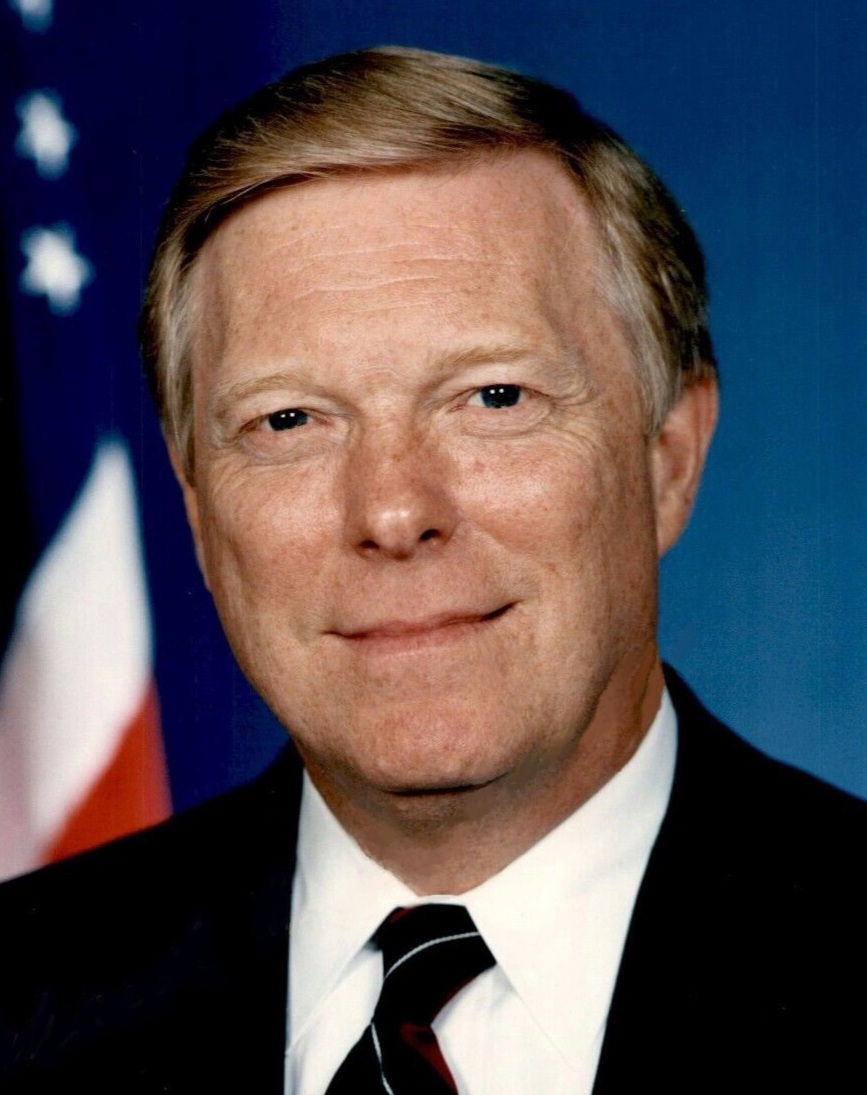
Former Representative
Dick Gephardt
from Missouri
(1977–2005)

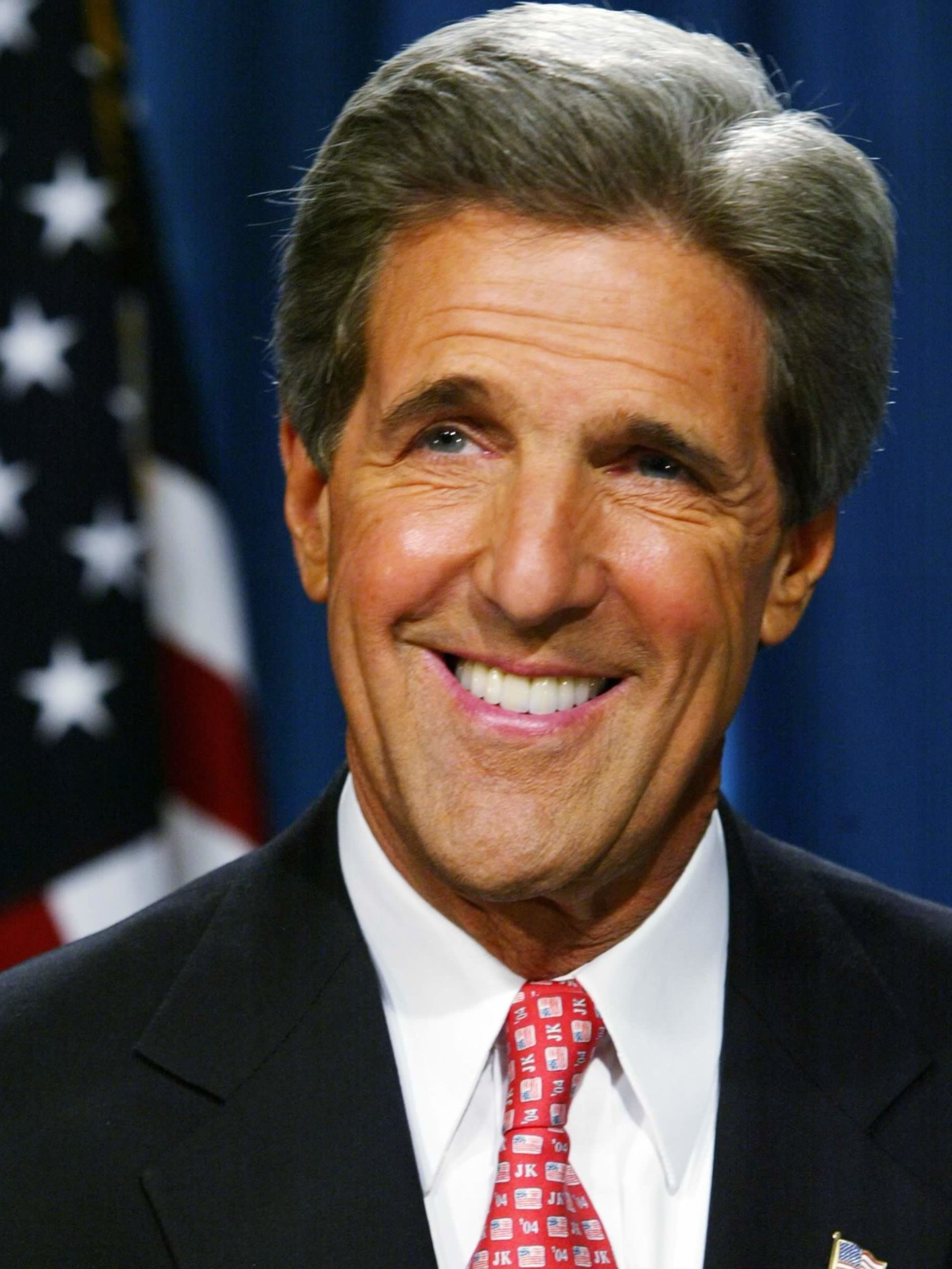
Senator and 2004 presidential nominee
John Kerry
from Massachusetts
(1985–2013)

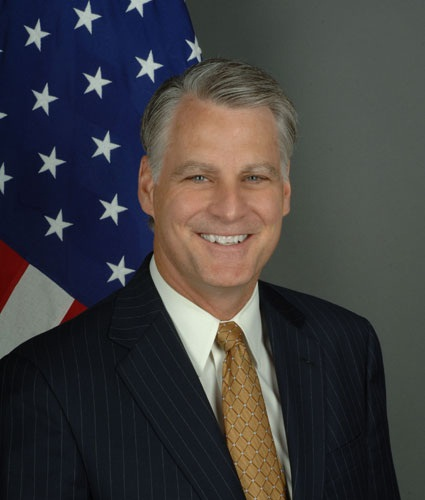
Former Representative
Tim Roemer
from Indiana
(1991–2003)

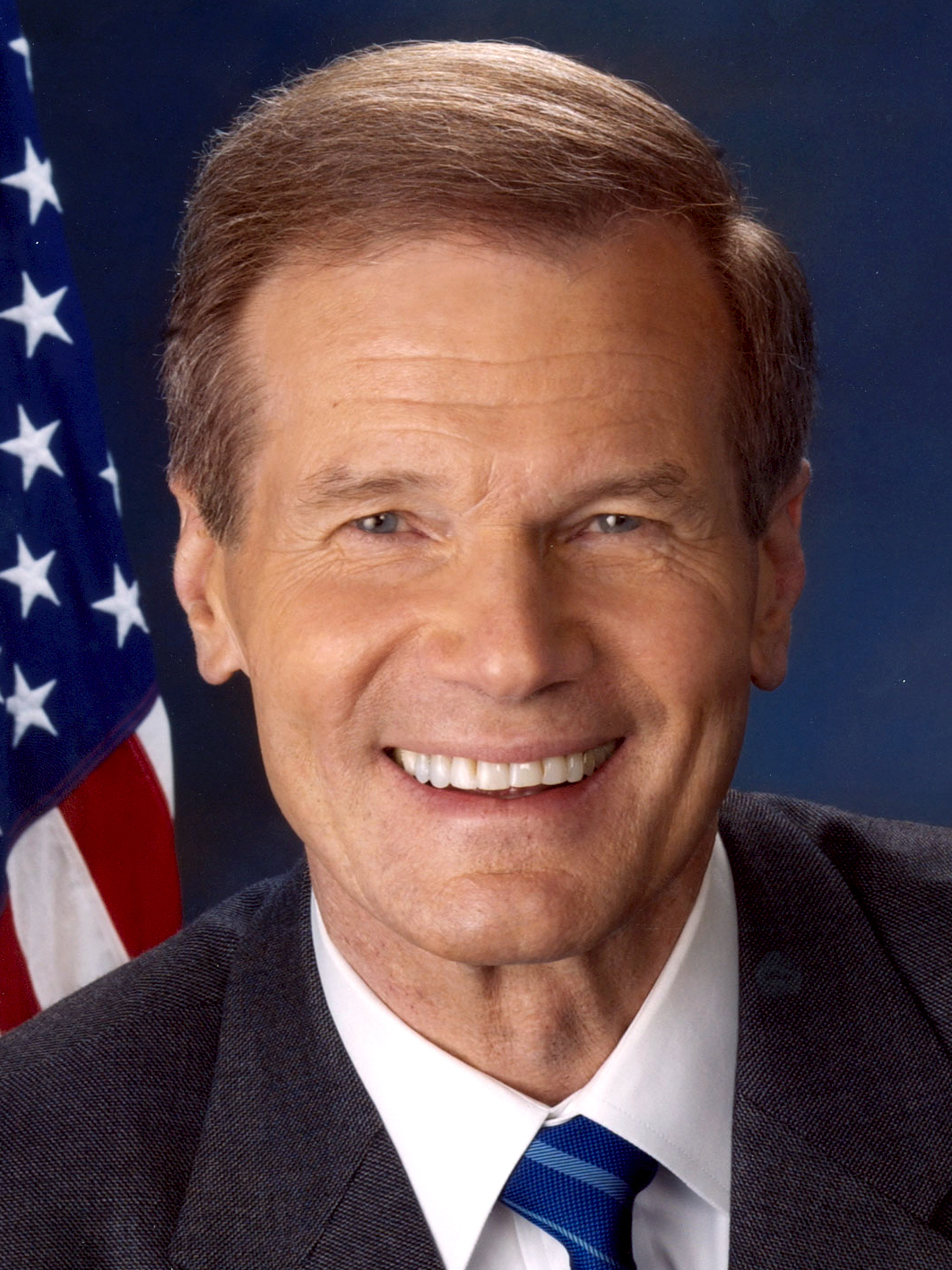
Senator
Bill Nelson
from Florida
(2001–2019)

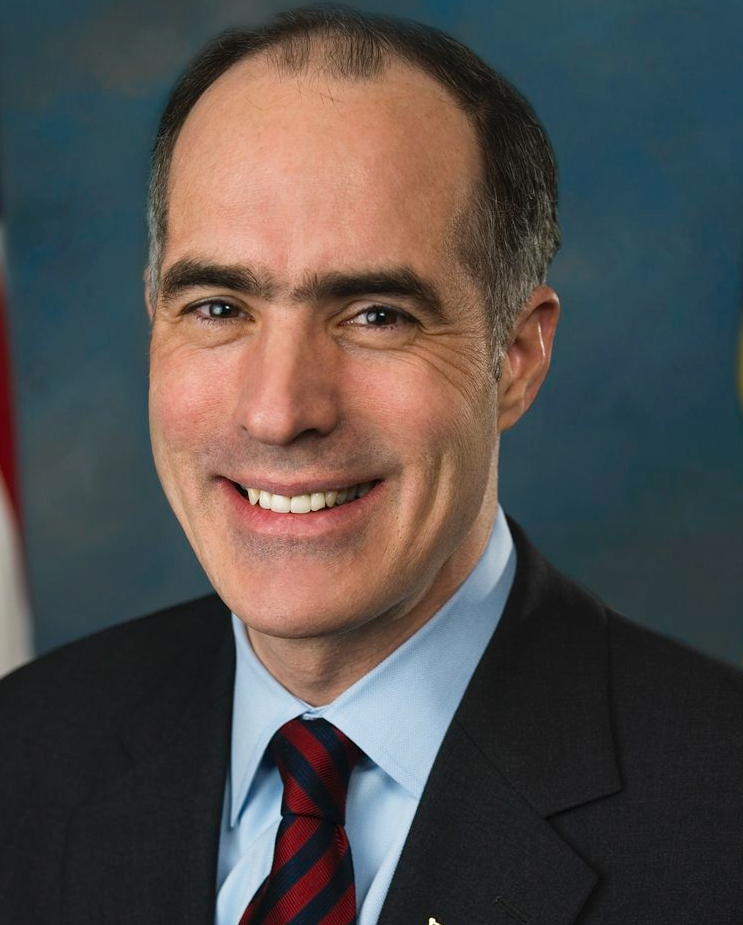
Senator
Bob Casey Jr.
from Pennsylvania
(2007–2025)

=== Governors ===
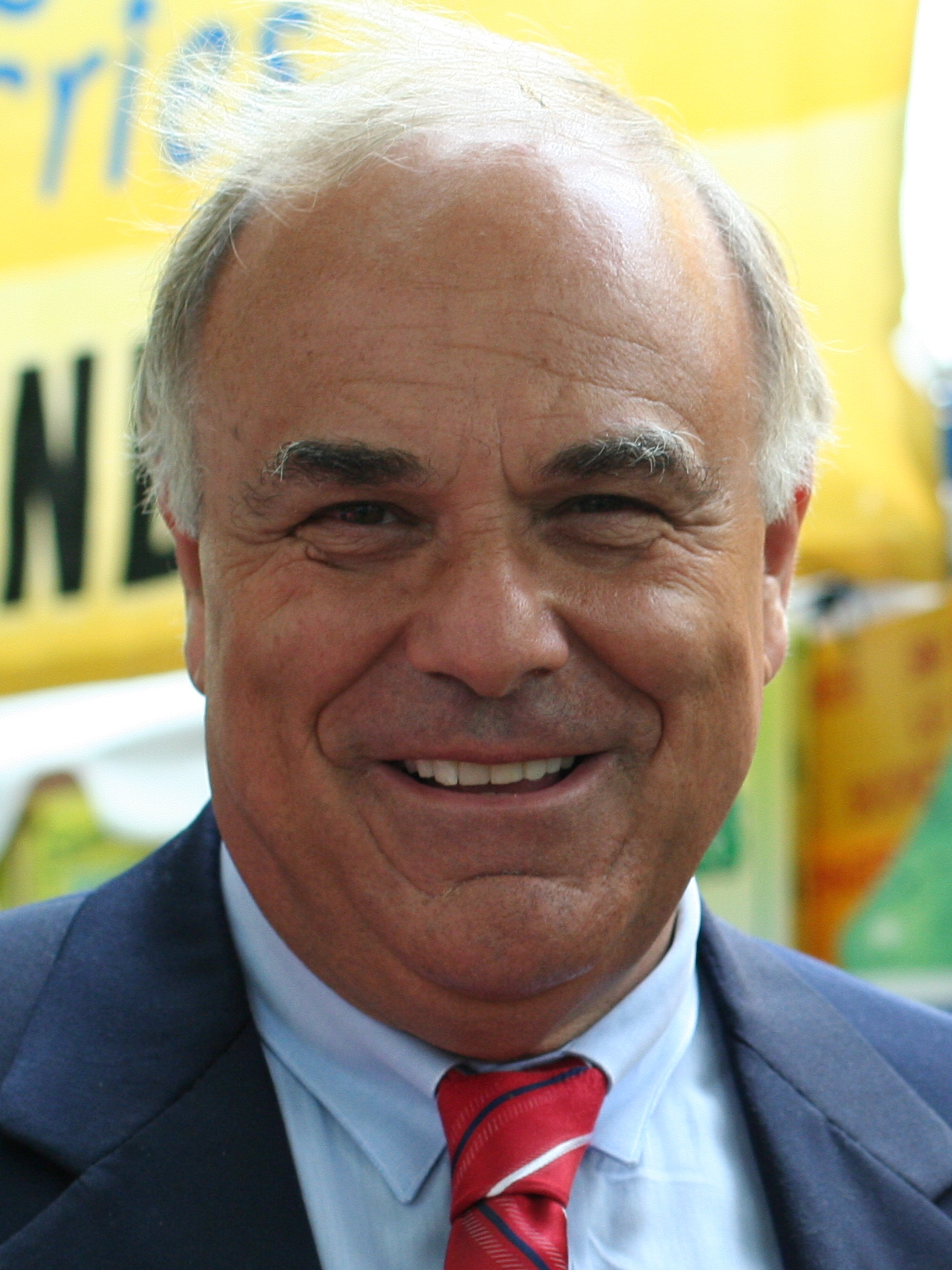
Ed Rendell
of Pennsylvania
(2003–2011)

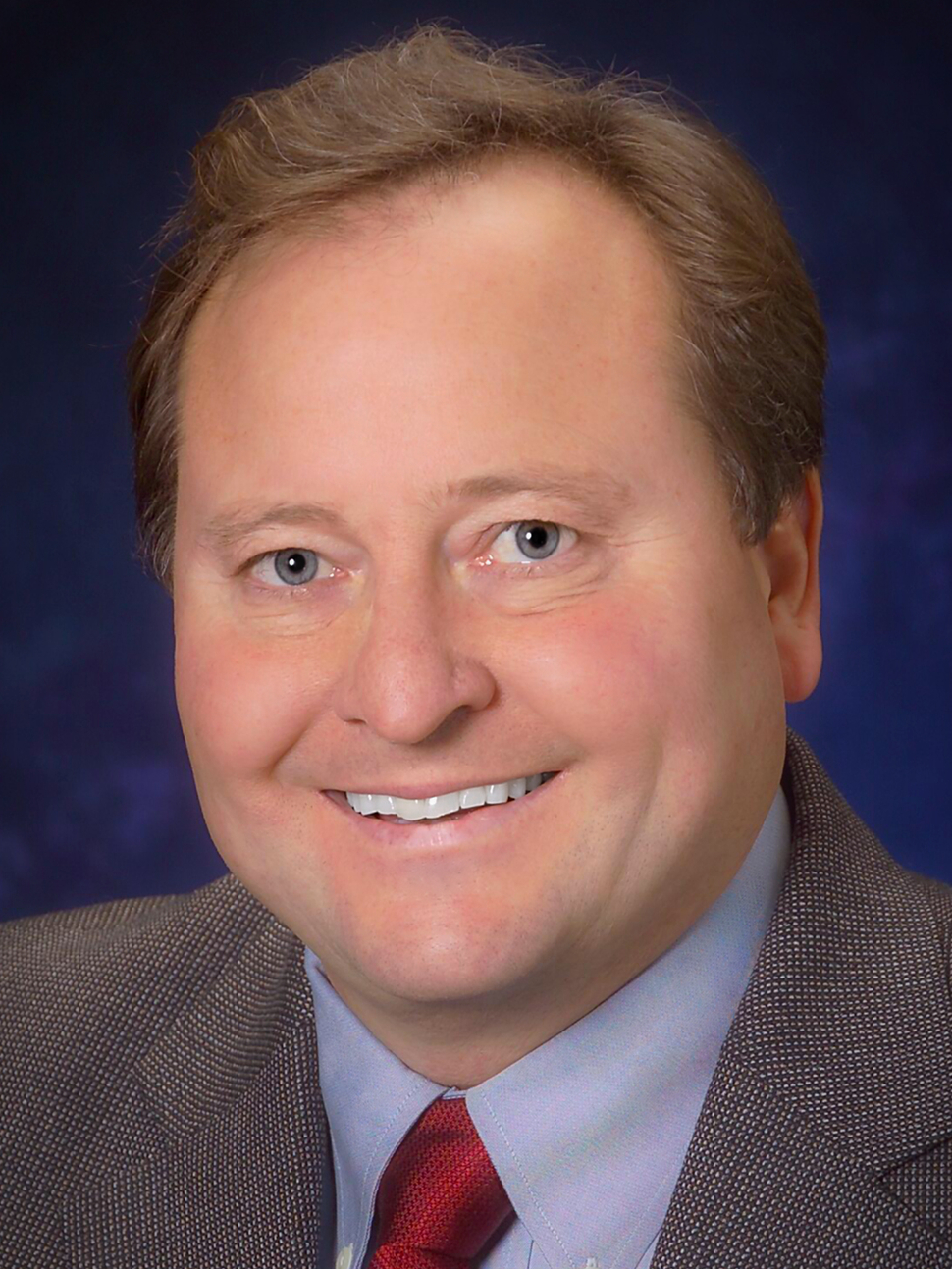
Brian Schweitzer
of Montana
(2005–2013)

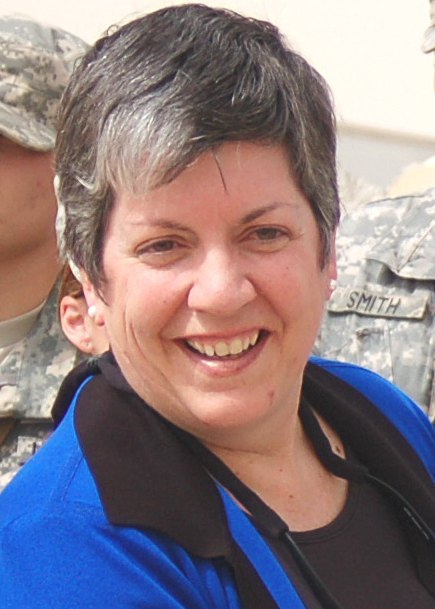
Janet Napolitano
of Arizona
(2003–2009)

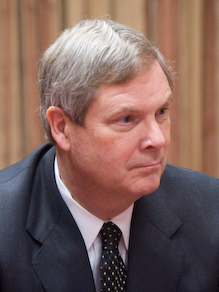
Tom Vilsack
of Iowa
(1999–2007)

=== Other individuals ===
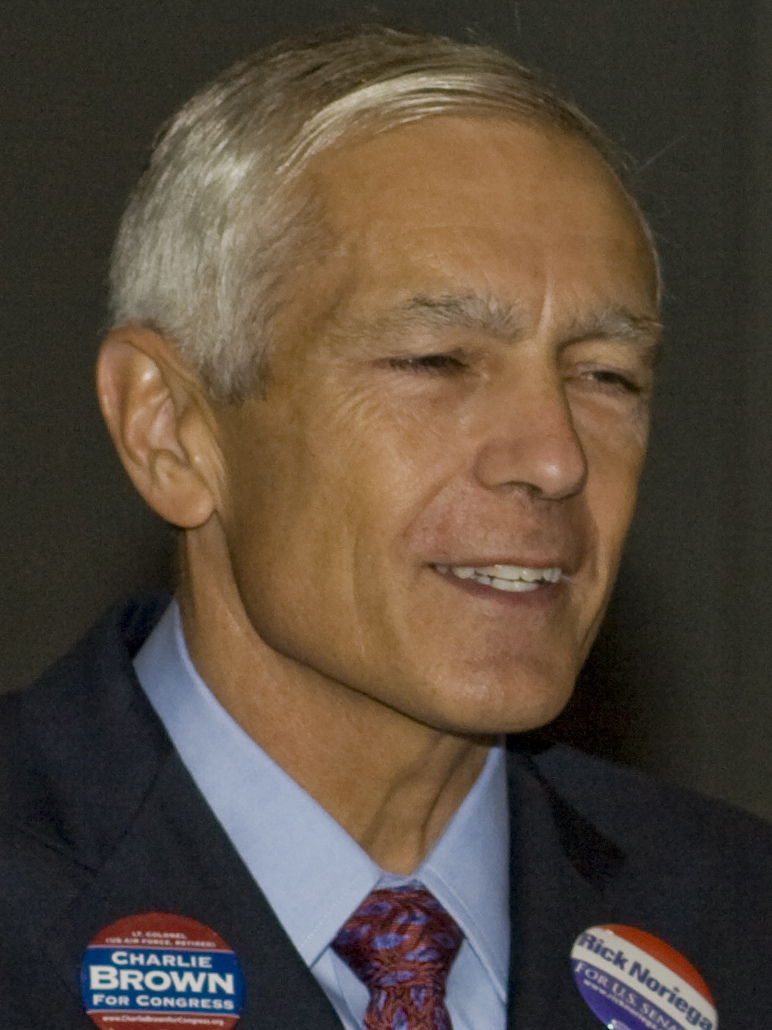
Supreme Allied Commander Europe
Wesley Clark
from Arkansas
(1997–2000)

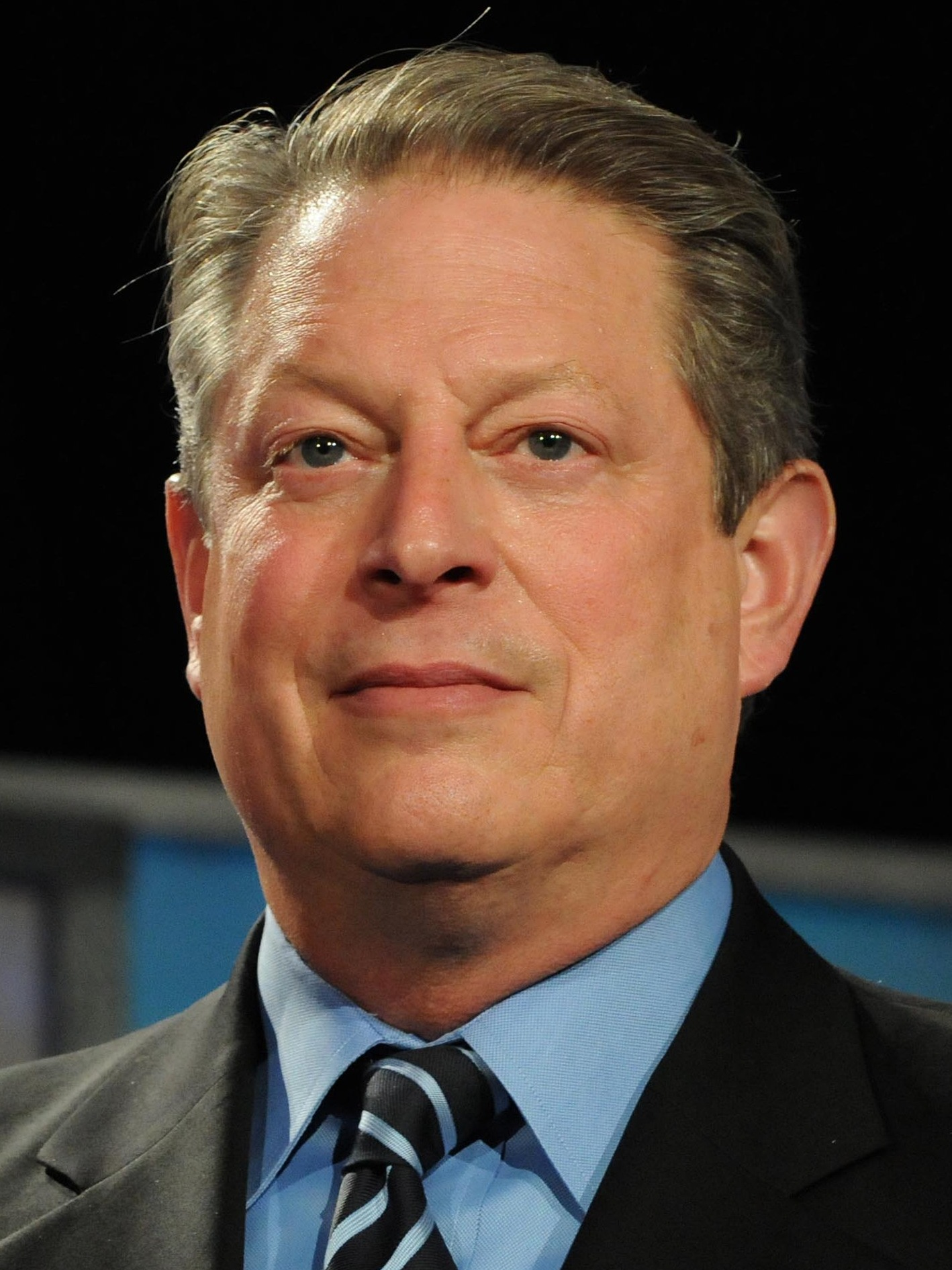
Former Vice President (1993–2001)
and 2000 presidential nominee
Al Gore
from Tennessee
(1993–2001)

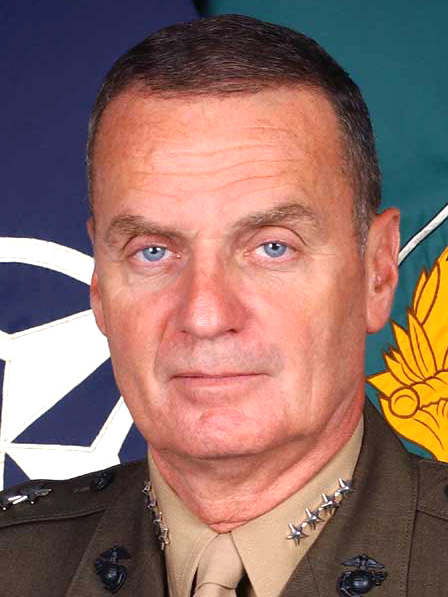
Supreme Allied Commander Europe
James L. Jones
from Missouri
(2003–2006)

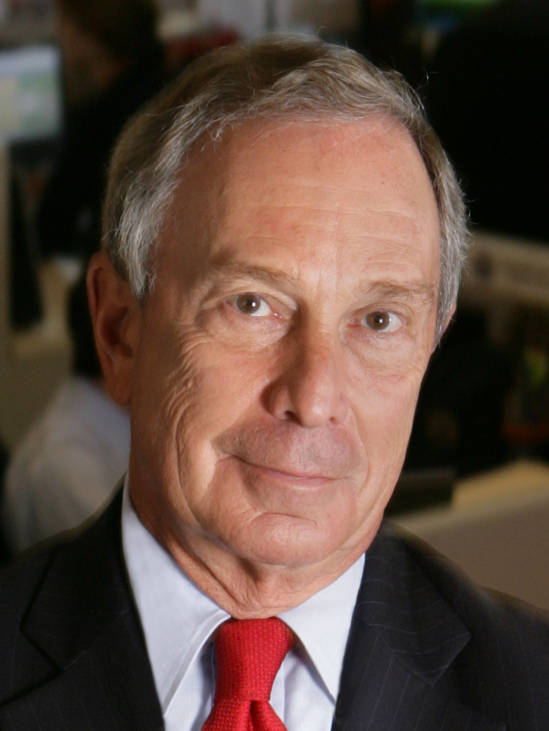
Independent Mayor of New York City
Michael Bloomberg
from New York
(2002–2013)

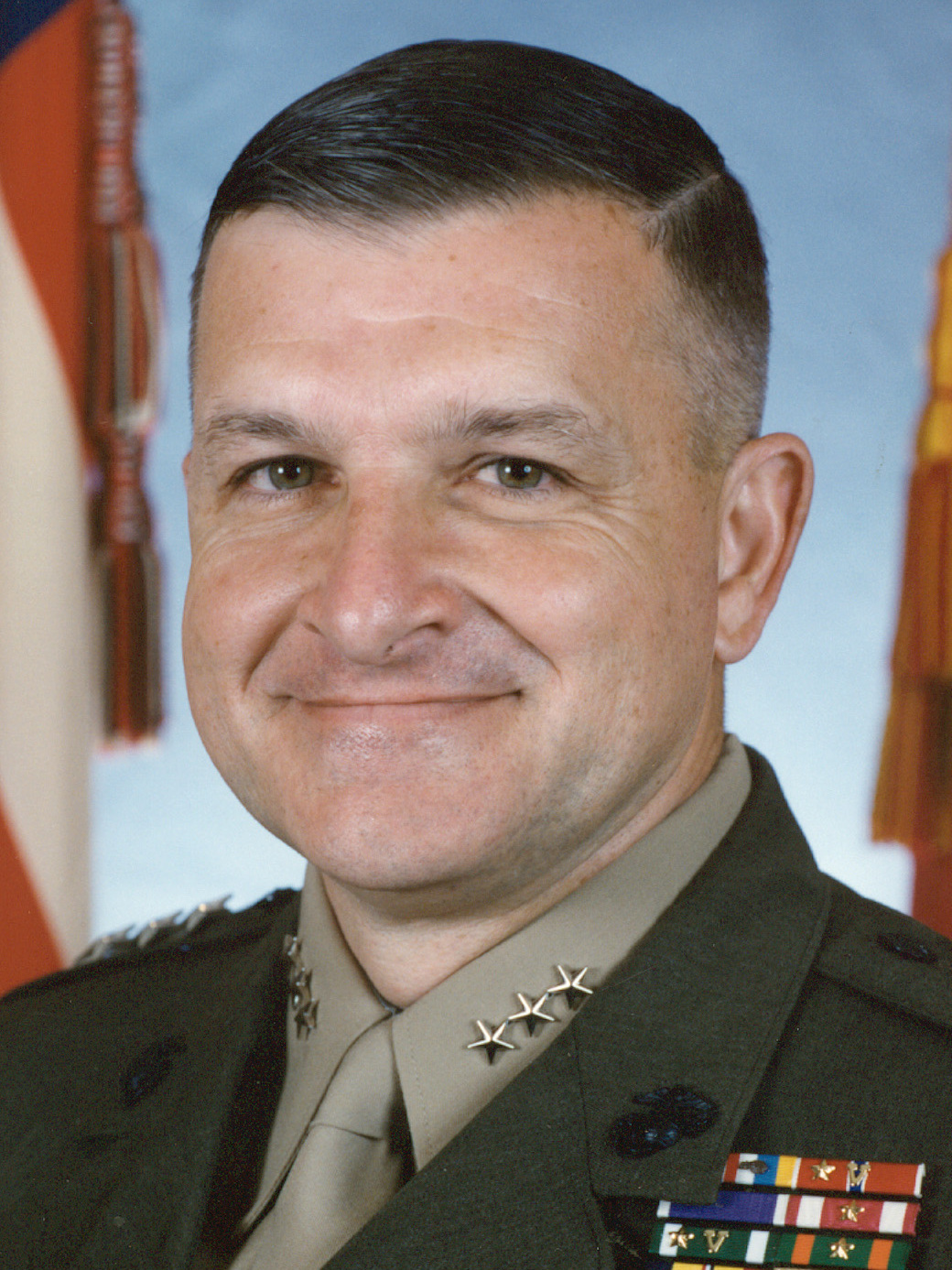
Former United States Special Envoy for Middle East Peace
Anthony Zinni
(2001–2003)

=== Denied interest ===
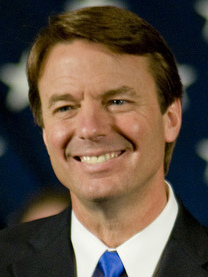
Senator, 2004/2008 presidential candidate, and 2004 vice presidential nominee
John Edwards
of North Carolina
(1999–2005)

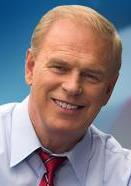
Governor
Ted Strickland
of Ohio
(2007–2011)

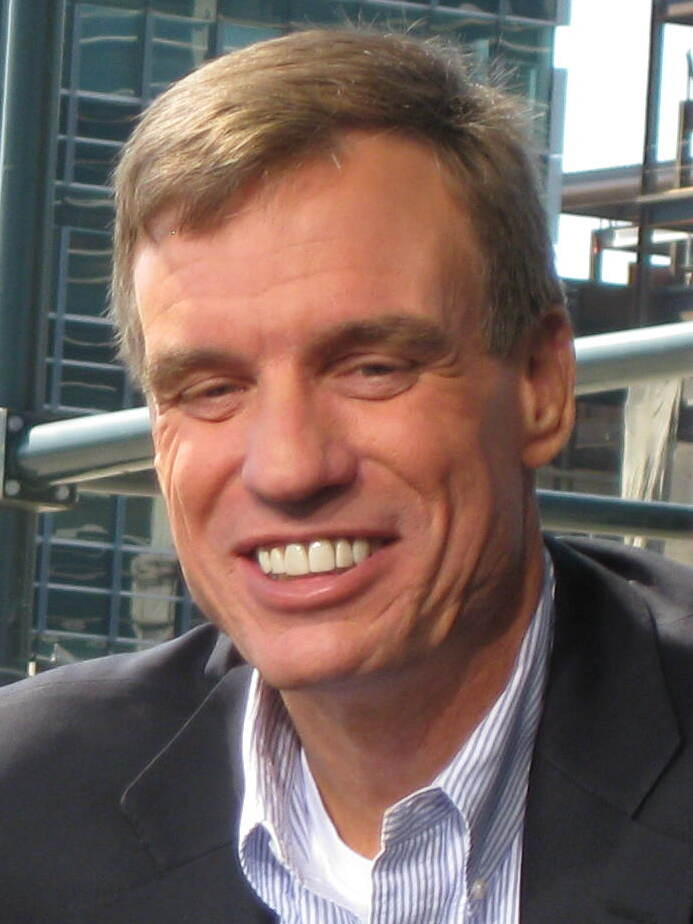
Governor
Mark Warner
of Virginia
(2002–2006)

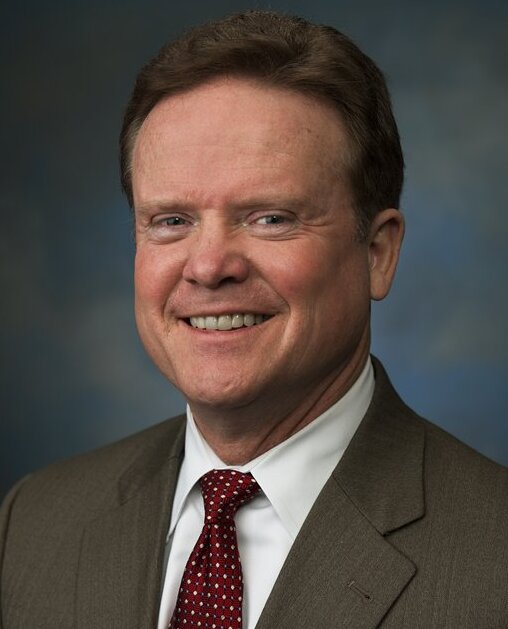
Senator
Jim Webb
of Virginia
(2007–2013)

== See also ==
- Barack Obama 2008 presidential campaign
- 2008 Democratic Party presidential candidates
- 2008 Democratic Party presidential primaries
- 2008 Democratic National Convention
- List of United States major party presidential tickets
