= Jan C. Ting =

American politician (born 1948)

Jan Ting
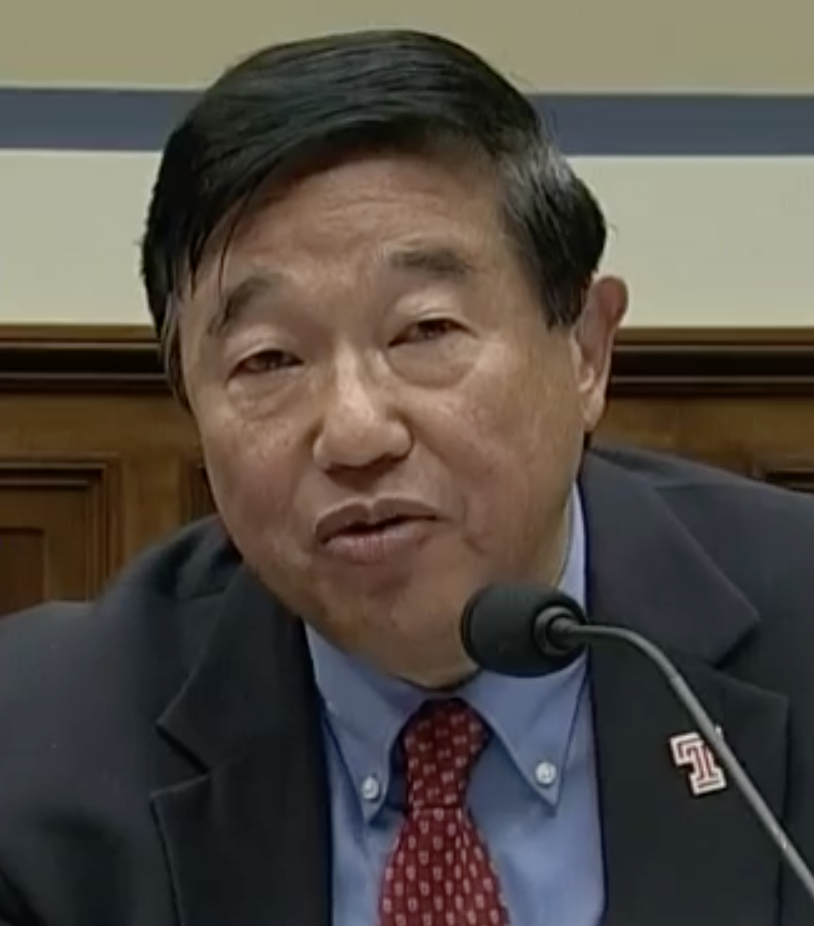

Personal details
- Born: December 17, 1948 (age 77) Ann Arbor, Michigan, U.S.
- Party: Republican (before 2008); Independent (2008–present)
- Spouse: Helen Page
- Education: Oberlin College (BA); University of Hawaiʻi at Mānoa (MA); Harvard University (JD)

Jan Ching-an Ting (Chinese: 丁景安; pinyin: Dīng Jǐngān; born December 17, 1948) is a professor of law at Temple University in Philadelphia, Pennsylvania. He was the Republican nominee for U.S. Senator from Delaware in the 2006 U.S. Senate election, but two years later Ting left the Republican Party in a dispute over his endorsement of Democratic presidential nominee Barack Obama.

== Early years ==
Ting was born in Ann Arbor, Michigan, son of Dr. Sik Woo Ting, a Chinese immigrant who came to the United States in 1938 with his wife, to continue their studies after the Japanese invasion of China. Ting's father received his medical degree from the University of Michigan in 1943, joined the U.S. Army as a medical officer during World War II and saw action at the Battle of the Bulge and the Battle for Germany. Dr. Sik Woo Ting received his U.S. citizenship while on active duty with the U.S. Army in France in 1945.

== Personal life ==
Jan Ting is a 1966 graduate of Lowrey High School in Dearborn, Michigan, a 1970 graduate of Oberlin College where he majored in history, and he received a Master of Arts degree in Asian Studies from the East–West Center of the University of Hawaiʻi at Mānoa in 1972. He received his J.D. degree from Harvard Law School in 1975. He resides in Wilmington, Delaware with his wife, Helen Page Ting, a physician. They have two daughters, Margaret and Mary.

== Professional career ==
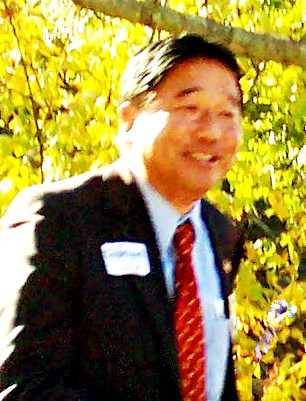
Ting in 2010

Ting joined the faculty of Temple University School of Law in 1977. He taught courses in taxation, immigration, citizenship, and national security. He has since retired. In 1990, he was appointed by President George H. W. Bush as Assistant Commissioner at the Immigration and Naturalization Service of the U.S. Department of Justice. He served in this capacity until 1993, when he returned to the faculty at Temple University, serving as director of the Graduate Tax Program from 1994 to 2001. He has also taught as a visiting professor at Widener University in Wilmington. He is also a senior fellow at the Foreign Policy Research Institute in Philadelphia. He serves on the boards of the Delaware Historical Society and the Center for Immigration Studies, a Washington, D.C., think tank.

Ting testified before the 9/11 Commission in December 2003 on the subject of immigration and national security. Ting has also testified before the United States Congress, and has published articles on the topics of taxation, immigration, and national security. He has been quoted in news reports and published commentary in various media including The Philadelphia Inquirer, New York Times, The Wall Street Journal, The Washington Post, the Chicago Tribune, National Public Radio, PBS Newshour, ABC Nightline, the NBC Today Show, Dateline, and Evening News programs. A frequent guest on CN-8, Fox News, and MSNBC, he continues to be called on to discuss current topics related to immigration and national security. He is a panelist on the public affairs program "Inside Story" on WPVI-TV, Channel 6-ABC in Philadelphia.

== Political career ==
Ting was appointed by Governor Michael N. Castle as chairman of the Delaware State Personnel Commission. In 2006 he was endorsed by the Delaware Republican convention as the party's candidate in the 2006 U.S. Senate election. Ting narrowly defeated primary opponent Michael D. Protack for the nomination, and was himself defeated by incumbent U.S. Senator Thomas R. Carper in the November 2006 election. Ting has also been a regional GOP chair and three-time representative to the Republican national convention.

== Departure from the Republican Party ==
In 1996, Ting was a delegate to the Republican National Convention and endorsed Bob Dole for president. In the 2008 primary elections, Ting was an advisor to Republican presidential candidate Rudy Giuliani, and expressed support for candidates Mitt Romney and Mike Huckabee. In the general election, however, he was discovered to have contributed to Barack Obama for president, observed attending a rally for Obama, and when asked cited his concerns about John McCain's immigration policy and support for the Iraq War. In April 2008, Bill Sahm, the chair of the Brandywine Region of the Delaware Republican Party, summoned Ting to a meeting where he was asked about his support for the Democratic candidate and his 25-year membership on his election district's Republican committee. As Sahm later recalled, Ting asked if he was being asked to resign from the Republican party; Sahm replied, "If you can't be loyal, that might be best for all concerned." Ting later referred to his resignation as an "expulsion".

== Election results ==
Year	Office	Election	Subject	Party	Votes	%	Opponent	Party	Votes	%
2006	U.S. Senator	Primary	Jan C. Ting	Republican	6,110	43%	Michael D. Protack; Christine O'Donnell	Republican	5,771; 2,505	40% 17%
2006	U.S. Senate	General	Jan C. Ting	Republican	69,732	29%	Thomas R. Carper	Democratic	170,544	70%

Party political offices
Preceded by William Roth	Republican nominee for U.S. Senator from Delaware (Class 1); 2006	Succeeded by Kevin Wade
