= 2006 United States Senate election in Delaware =

- November 7, 2006
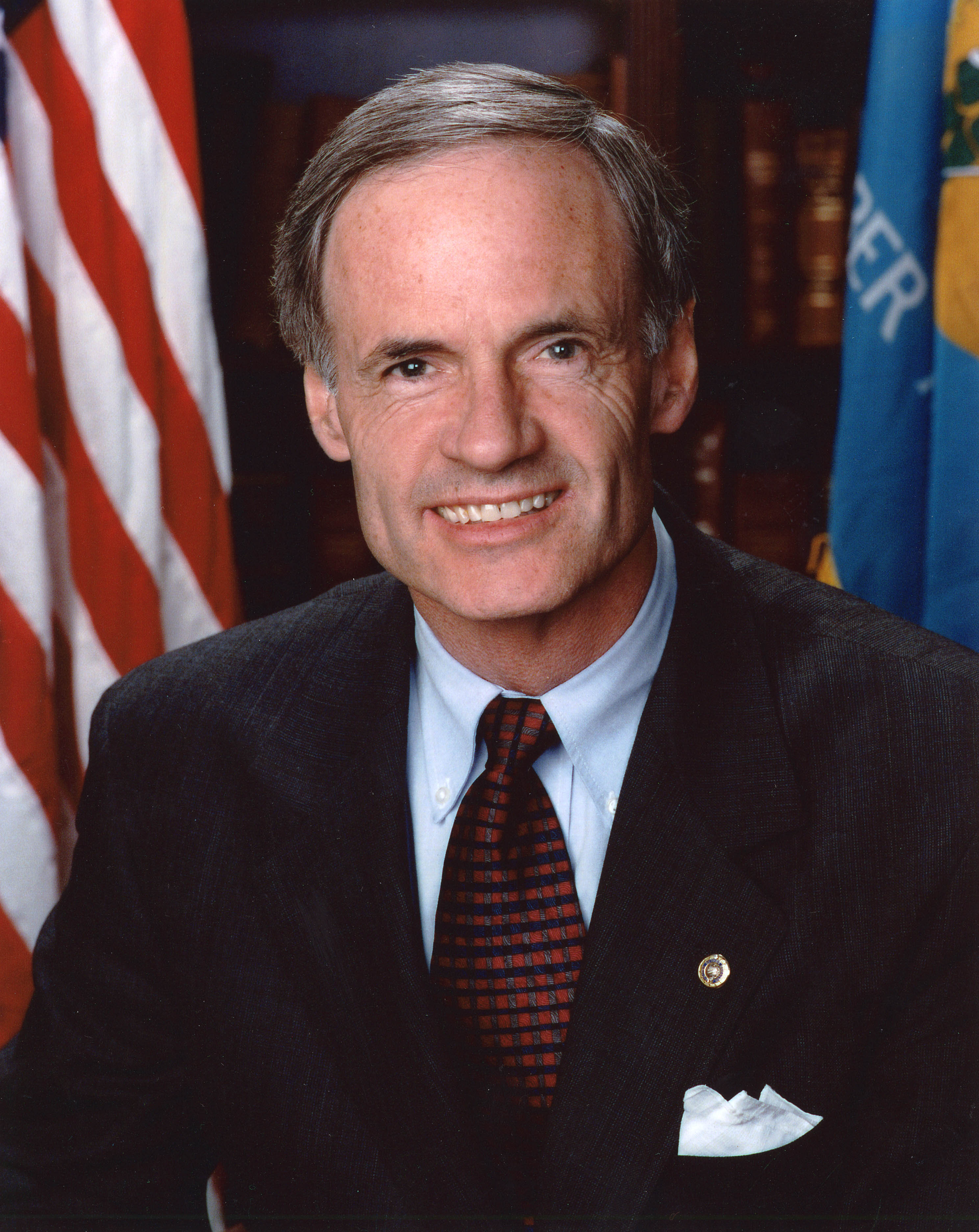

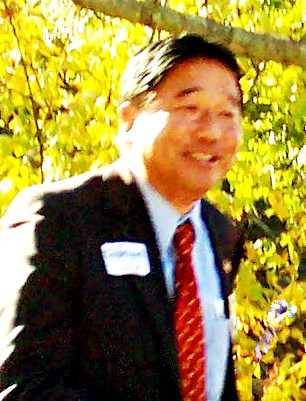
Nominee	Tom Carper	Jan C. Ting
Party	Democratic	Republican
Popular vote	170,567	69,744
Percentage	67.13%	27.44%
- Carper: 50–60% 60–70% 70–80% 80–90%
U.S. senator before election
Tom Carper
Democratic
Elected U.S. Senator
Tom Carper
Democratic

The 2006 United States Senate election in Delaware was held November 7, 2006. Incumbent Democratic U.S. Senator Tom Carper won re-election to a second term, by a landslide 100,833 votes. This election was the first time since 1893 that a Democratic incumbent was re-elected to this seat.

== Republican primary ==
=== Candidates ===
- Christine O'Donnell, anti-abortion advocate (ran as a write-in candidate in the general election)
- Mike D. Protack, commercial airline pilot
- Jan C. Ting, Temple University law professor

=== Results ===
Republican primary results
Party	Candidate	Votes	%
Republican	Jan C. Ting	6,110	42.47
Republican	Michael D. Protack	5,771	40.12
Republican	Christine O'Donnell	2,505	17.41
Total votes		14,386	100.00

== General election ==
=== Candidates ===
- Tom Carper (D), incumbent U.S. Senator
- Jan C. Ting (R), law professor
- William E. Morris (L), activist
- Christine O'Donnell (write-in), anti-abortion activist

=== Debates ===
- Complete video of debate, October 20, 2006

=== Predictions ===
Source	Ranking	As of
The Cook Political Report	Solid D	November 6, 2006
Sabato's Crystal Ball	Safe D	November 6, 2006
Rothenberg Political Report	Safe D	November 6, 2006
Real Clear Politics	Safe D	November 6, 2006

=== Polling ===
Source	Date	Tom Carper (D)	Jan C. Ting (R)
Fairleigh Dickinson	September 22, 2006	63%	23%
Fairleigh Dickinson	October 31, 2006	60%	26%

=== Results ===
General election results
Party	Candidate	Votes	%	±%
Democratic	Tom Carper (incumbent)	170,567	67.13%	+11.60%
Republican	Jan C. Ting	69,734	27.44%	−16.26%
Write-in	Christine O'Donnell	11,127	4.38%	
Libertarian	William E. Morris	2,671	1.05%	+0.71%
Majority		100,833	39.68%	+27.85%
Turnout		254,099		
Democratic hold		Swing		

==== By county ====
County	Tom Carper Democratic		Jan Ting Republican		All Others	
County	#	%	#	%	#	%
Kent	23,492	61.07	13,191	34.29	1,787	4.64
New Castle	115,769	72.49	39,655	24.83	4,279	2.68
Sussex	31,306	55.48	16,888	29.93	8,236	14.59
Totals	170,567	66.99	69,734	27.39	4,302	5.62

Counties that flipped from Republican to Democratic

- Kent (largest city: Dover)
- Sussex (largest city: Seaford)

== See also ==
- 2006 United States Senate elections
